= List of gangs in Italy =

The following article is a list of notable gangs, crime families, criminal enterprises and related syndicates located in the Italian Republic.

Criminal organizations composed of individuals with Italian ancestry or that were founded by Italian immigrants (e.g. the Five Families) are not to be included if the group does not have a physical presence within Italy.

== Mafia crime families (unspecific) ==
- Capriati clan
- Nuova Mala del Brenta, a.k.a. the Venetian Mafia
- Parisi-Palermiti clan
- Sacra Corona Unita, a.k.a. the Forth Mafia
- Società foggiana, a.k.a. the Fifth Mafia
- Strisciuglio clan

== Camorra clans ==
- Aprea-Cuccaro clan
- Casalesi clan
- Casamonica clan
- Cesarano clan
- Giuliano clan
- Mallardo clan
- Mazzarella clan
- Moccia clan
- Polverino clan
- Vollaro clan

== 'Ndrine ('Ndrangheta clans) ==
- Barbaro 'ndrina
- Bellocco 'ndrina
- Bonavota 'ndrina
- Cataldo 'ndrina, a.k.a. Clan Cataldo
- Commisso 'ndrina
- Cordì 'ndrina, a.k.a. Clan Cordì
- De Stefano 'ndrina, a.k.a. the De Stefano-Tegano family
- La Rosa 'ndrina
- Latella 'ndrina
- Lo Presti 'ndrina
- Mammoliti 'ndrina
- Mancuso 'ndrina
- Mazzaferro 'ndrina
- Musitano crime family, a.k.a. Musitano 'ndrina
- Papalia 'ndrina
- Pelle 'ndrina, a.k.a. Pelle-Vottari
- Pesce 'ndrina
- Piromalli 'ndrina
- Piserà 'ndrina
- Serraino 'ndrina

== Sicilian Mafia families ==
- Corleone Mafia family
- Catania Mafia family
- Ramacca Mafia family
- Pietraperzia Mafia family
- Caltagirone Mafia family

== Other criminal groups ==
- Albanian mafia, a.k.a. Mafia shqiptare
- Azerbaijani mafia
- Bandidos Motorcycle Club
- Bulgarian mafia, a.k.a. Mutri
- Greek mafia
- Hells Angels Motorcycle Club
- Latin Kings
- Loners Motorcycle Club
- Lowlanders Motorcycle Club
- Nigerian mafia
  - Black Axe (confraternity), a.k.a. Black Axe mafia
- No Surrender Motorcycle Club
- Outlaws Motorcycle Club
- Pakistani mafia
- Rebels Motorcycle Club
- Romanian mafia, a.k.a. Clanuri Interlope
- Turkish mafia, a.k.a. Türk mafyası
  - Saral mafia
  - Sahin mafia
- Ukrainian mafia

== Inactive criminal organizations ==
- Alfieri clan
- Anonima sarda
- Banda della Comasina
- Basilischi
- Cuntrera-Caruana Mafia clan
- Demon Eyes MC
- Galatolo Mafia clan
- Gang de la Brise de Mer
- Greco Mafia clan
- Kanisters MC
- Mafia Capitale
- Minore Mafia clan
- Nuvoletta clan
- Old Pistons MC
- White Uno Gang, a.k.a. Banda della Uno bianca

== See also ==
- List of Italian Mafia crime families
