= List of Italian Mafia crime families =

List of ethnically Italian organised crime groups

This is a list of Italian organized crime groups around the world. Some of these organizations are not linked or affiliated in any way with the Cosa Nostra, the Camorra or the 'Ndrangheta, but are independent criminal groups created by Italian immigrants in other countries.

Furthermore, this list does not include all groups, clans or families identified as Cosa Nostra (Mafia crime families), Camorra, 'Ndrangheta or Sacra Corona Unita clans.

== Italy ==
In Italy there are many different Mafia-like organizations.

=== Veneto ===
- In the Region of Veneto the Mala del Brenta operate in the area.

=== Lombardy ===
- In the Region of Lombardy the Banda della Comasina operated in the area. – defunct 1987

=== Lazio ===
- In the Region of Lazio the Banda della Magliana – defunct 1993
- The Mafia Capitale – defunct 2014

=== Basilicata ===
- In the Region of Basilicata the defunct Basilischi operated in the area.

=== Apulia ===
- In the Region of Apulia the Sacra Corona Unita, Bari crime clans and the Società foggiana control the area.

=== Calabria ===
- In the Region of Calabria the 'Ndrangheta clans control the area.

=== Campania ===
- In the Region of Campania the Camorra clans control the area.

=== Sicily ===
- In the Region of Sicily the Sicilian Mafia clans (Note: The clans are united under a Mandamento, led by a Capomadamento, that represents the clans' bosses to the Cupola. In Sicily, there are 94 Mafia families subject to 29 mandamenti.) and the Stidda control the area.

== United States ==
According to the 2004 New Jersey State Commission of Investigation, there were 24 active Mafia families in the United States. In 2004, author Thomas Milhorn reported that the Mafia was active in 26 cities across the United States.

=== Northeastern United States ===
==== New York ====
- The Five Families – operate in New York City, the New York Metropolitan area, New Jersey, Connecticut, Massachusetts, Pennsylvania, Florida, California and Nevada.
  - Bonanno
  - Colombo
  - Gambino
  - Genovese
  - Lucchese

Western New York

- Buffalo crime family (Magaddino family)
- Rochester crime family – defunct 1993

==== New Jersey ====
- DeCavalcante crime family (mostly North Jersey and Central Jersey)
- The Five Families of New York have crews operating in New Jersey
  - Lucchese crime family New Jersey faction
  - Genovese crime family New Jersey faction
  - Gambino crime family operates throughout New Jersey, including a faction in Cherry Hill and Trenton
  - Bonanno crime family operates throughout Northern New Jersey
- Philadelphia crime family operates in South Jersey, including Atlantic City, as well as Trenton in Central Jersey

==== Pennsylvania ====
- Philadelphia crime family (Bruno-Scarfo family)
- Bufalino crime family (Northeastern Pennsylvania, particularly Pittston, Wilkes-Barre, Scranton and the Wyoming Valley area) – defunct 2008
- Pittsburgh crime family (LaRocca family) – defunct 2021

==== West Virginia ====
- Famiglia Vagabonda (Piscioneri family) – defunct 1923

==== New England ====
- Patriarca crime family (Boston, Massachusetts and Providence, Rhode Island, parts of Connecticut).
- Genovese crime family Springfield faction (Springfield, Massachusetts) and New Haven crew (New Haven, Connecticut)
- Philadelphia crime family Boston faction (Boston)

==== Maryland ====
- Gambino family Baltimore Crew (Baltimore) – defunct 1990

=== Midwestern United States ===
==== Illinois ====
- Chicago Outfit
- Genna Crime Family – defunct 1930
- Rockford crime family (Zammuto family) – defunct 2005
- Springfield crime family (Zito family) – defunct 1970s

==== Indiana ====
- Chicago Outfit Gary Faction (Gary)

==== Michigan ====
- Detroit Partnership (Zerilli family)

==== Nebraska ====
- Kansas City family Omaha faction (Omaha) – defunct 1991

==== Iowa ====
- Chicago outfit Des Moines faction (Des Moines) – defunct 1967

==== Missouri ====
- Kansas City crime family (Civella family)
- St. Louis crime family (Giordano family) – defunct 2014

==== Ohio ====
The city of Youngstown was at one point considered open territory, split between the Cleveland crime family (Porrello family) and the Pittsburgh crime family (LaRocca family).

- Cleveland crime family (Scalish family)

==== Wisconsin ====
- Milwaukee crime family (Balistrieri family) – defunct 2024
- Madison crime family (Caputo family) – defunct 1993

=== Southern United States ===
==== Alabama ====
- Birmingham crime family – defunct since 1938

==== Florida ====
- Trafficante crime family (Tampa area) – possibly defunct, Florida is considered open territory with many families operating in the area.
- The Chicago Outfit – is operating in South Florida
- The Five Families of New York have crews operating in South Florida
  - Bonanno crime family – is operating in South Florida
  - Colombo crime family's Florida faction – is operating in South Florida
  - Gambino crime family's Florida faction – is operating in South Florida and the Tampa Bay Area.
  - Genovese crime family – is operating in South Florida. See soldier Albert Facchiano
  - Lucchese crime family – is operating in South Florida and Central Florida Counties of Pasco and Pinellas.
- DeCavalcante crime family – Florida faction is operating in Miami.

==== Louisiana ====
- New Orleans crime family (Marcello family) – mostly defunct after 2007

==== Texas ====
- Dallas crime family (Civello family) – defunct 1970s
- Maceo Organization (Galveston-Houston family) – defunct 1980s

=== Western United States ===
==== Arizona ====
- Chicago Outfit – (defunct) under Joseph "Papa Joe" Tocco the family operated in Phoenix
- Bonanno family Arizona crew – (defunct) under Salvatore Bonanno the family operated in Tucson

==== California ====
- Los Angeles crime family (Dragna family)
- San Francisco crime family (Lanza family) – defunct 2006
- San Jose crime family (Cerrito family) – defunct 2009
- Bonanno family San Jose faction (San Jose) – defunct
- Detroit Partnership San Diego faction (San Diego) – defunct

==== Nevada ====
Las Vegas is considered open territory allowing all crime families to operate in the city's casinos. Since the 1930s, the Los Angeles family, the Five Families of New York and the Midwest families have owned and operated in Casinos in the Las Vegas Strip.

- See: Mobsters in Las Vegas

==== Colorado ====
- Denver crime family (Smaldone family) – defunct 2006

==== Washington ====
- Colacurcio Organization (Seattle) – defunct 2010s

== Canada ==
=== Ontario ===
In Southern Ontario there are two types of Italian organized crime Cosa Nostra (Sicilian) and 'Ndrangheta (Calabrian). In the 2018 book, The Good Mothers: The True Story of the Women Who Took on the World's Most Powerful Mafia, Alex Perry reports that the Calabrian 'Ndrangheta has, for the past decade, been replacing the Sicilian Cosa Nostra as the primary drug traffickers in North America.

- Musitano crime family – a Calabrian mafia family, based in Hamilton
- Papalia crime family – a Calabrian mafia family, based in Hamilton, with strong connections to the Buffalo crime family
- Luppino crime family – a Calabrian mafia family, based in Hamilton, with strong connections to the Buffalo crime family
- Siderno Group – is the name for the "'Ndrangheta" clans (crime families). There have been seven senior 'Ndrangheta bosses in the Greater Toronto Area, some on the Camera di Controllo, the "board of directors" – namely in Vaughan.
  - Commisso, led by Cosimo Commisso, of Toronto, Ontario
  - Coluccio led by Antonio Coluccio, of Richmond Hill, Ontario
  - Tavernese, led by Vincenzo Tavernese, of Thornhill, Ontario
  - DeMaria, led by Vincenzo “Jimmy” DeMaria, of Mississauga, Ontario
  - Figliomeni, led by Cosimo Figliomeni, of Vaughan, Ontario
  - Ruso, led by Domenic Ruso, of Brampton, Ontario

Carmine Verduci was also linked with the 'Ndrangheta group. Leaders are based both in Calabria, Italy and Ontario. The Siderno clans are part of the Commisso 'ndrina a crime family based in Calabria.

During a 2018 criminal trial, an Italian police expert testified that the 'Ndrangheta operated in the Greater Toronto Area and in Thunder Bay particularly in drug trafficking, extortion, loan sharking, theft of public funds, robbery, fraud, electoral crimes and crimes of violence. After the trial, Tom Andreopoulos, deputy chief federal prosecutor, said that this was the first time in Canada that the 'Ndrangheta was targeted as an organized crime group since 1997, when the Criminal Code was amended to include the offence of criminal organization. He offered this comment about the organization:

We're talking about structured organized crime. We're talking about a political entity, almost; a culture of crime that colonizes across the sea from Italy to Canada. This is one of the most sophisticated criminal organizations in the world.

=== Quebec ===
In Quebec there are two types of Italian organized crime: Cosa Nostra and 'Ndrangheta. While Canadian law enforcement agencies consider the Rizzuto and Cotroni crime families to be separate, the FBI considers them to be sub-units of the Bonanno crime family's Montreal faction.

- Cotroni crime family – a "'Ndrangheta" family, the Calabrian faction – defunct 2000s
- Cuntrera-Caruana Mafia clan – a Canadian extension of the Sicilian family
- Rizzuto crime family – a "Cosa Nostra" family, the Sicilian faction

== United Kingdom ==
=== England ===
Italian crime groups in England were founded independently, without any affiliation or relation to the historical crime groups from Italy (Cosa Nostra, Camorra or 'Ndrangheta).

- The Italian mob – led by Charles 'Darby' Sabini during the interwar years with possible links to the Sicilian mafia.
- Bert "Battles" Rossi – also known as the "General of Clerkenwell". He acted as the representative for the American mafia in London from the 1960s to the mid-1970s.
- The Cortesi brothers – rivals of the Sabinis.
- The Rocca family – A group of enforcers that were based in Islington that preceded Sabini.

=== Scotland ===
- La Torre clan – a Camorra clan from Mondragone, Italy was operating in Aberdeen, Scotland and was led by Antonio La Torre.

== Australia ==
In Australia the predominant Italian criminal organization is the 'Ndrangheta, also having smaller crime groups, but in this case, without any affiliation or relation to the historical Italian crime groups.

=== New South Wales ===
- Barbaro 'ndrina – a Calabrian Clan based in Platì, Italy with operations in Griffith
- Robert Trimbole's Crew (defunct), once controlled the marijuana drug market in Griffith.

=== Victoria ===
- The Carlton Crew – a predominantly Sicilian group, operating in Melbourne.
- The Honoured Society

== Argentina ==
Argentina between the 1920s and 1930s had a criminal organization led by an Italian, but without any links to the historical Italian crime groups.

=== Santa Fe Province ===
Juan Galiffi's gang – famous crime group during the 1920s and 1930s in the city of Rosario.

== See also ==
- List of gangs in Italy
- List of Italian-American mobsters
- List of Italian-American mobsters by organization

== Sources ==
- Capeci, Jerry. The Complete Idiot's Guide to the Mafia. Indianapolis: Alpha Books, 2002. ISBN 0-02-864225-2
- Milhorn, H. Thomas. Crime: Computer Viruses to Twin Towers. Universal Publishers, 2005. ISBN 1-58112-489-9
