= Nicholas Conn =

- Born: 28 December 1981 (age 44)
- Citizenship: British
- Occupations: Businessman, addiction expert

Nicholas Conn (born 28 December 1981) is a British businessman. He is the founder and CEO of a drug and alcohol rehab center called Help4addiction, which was founded in 2015.

== Education and career ==
At the age of 19, he started his career as a policeman in Metropolitan Police Service which lasted for five years.

== Addiction and recovery ==
After five years Conn left the police force because of cocaine addiction. He then started working for real estate companies and left Britain to work in Berlin, where he encountered with Albanian mafia members. In his book, he describes the whole experience as "life-threatening."

After leaving Berlin, he wrote the memoir The thin white line (2013).
