= Capriati =

Capriati is an Italian surname. Notable people with the surname include:

- Jennifer Capriati (born 1976), American former world No. 1 tennis player
- Joseph Capriati (born 1987), Italian DJ and music producer
- Steven Capriati (born 1979), American tennis player

== See also ==
- Capriati a Volturno, municipality in the Province of Caserta in the Italian region Campania, Italy
- Capriati clan, organized crime group based in the Italian city of Bari
