= Savino Parisi =

Italian criminal

- Born: 14 December 1960 (age 65); Bari, Apulia, Italy
- Other names: Savinuccio
- Known for: Founder and head of the Parisi-Palermiti clan
- Criminal status: Imprisoned since 2016
- Children: Tommaso "Tommy" Parisi
- Relatives: Giuseppe Parisi (brother)
- Allegiance: Parisi-Palermiti clan

Savino Parisi (14 December 1960) is an Italian criminal, one of the most important crime bosses of the Bari region, and one of the founders and heads of the Parisi-Palermiti clan.

== Biography ==
Savino Parisi, known as "Savinuccio", made his way in the Bari crime scene with robberies, extortions and smuggling in the 1970s. Parisi soon became the right-hand man of Francesco Biancoli, known as Il Dado, who controlled the gambling dens and drug dealing in the Libertà district during the 1980s.

In 1984, he was brought among the defendants in the maxi-trial against Puglia, before joining the Sacra Corona Unita and then leaving it in 1986, founding an independent clan in the Bari's Japigia neighbourhood. Between the 1980s and 1990s Japigia was one of the most important heroin dealing area in Southern Italy and Parisi, together with Antonio Capriati, founder and historical head of the Capriati clan, established links with the 'Ndrangheta, making money rain down thanks to drugs and extortion.

After several detentions he was finally arrested on 9 March 2016 and since then he has been in prison with long sentences to serve.

According to media reports in January 2025, in authorized video calls, intercepted by investigators, Savino Parisi allegedly declared that he "has no regrets and would do everything he has done again". According to the prosecution, Parisi would continue to manage the clan's affairs even from prison, sending "embassies" to his family, especially to his son Tommaso and his brother Giuseppe "Mames", considered the current regent of the clan. On 21 February 2025, Parisi, before the judge of the abbreviated trial in which he is involved, denied having used "cryptic and allusive" language relating to illegal affairs during video calls made from Terni prison. In short, he would not have conveyed any message to the outside, nor would he have ever been asked for his consent to settle disputes within the clan and, of some events, he would not even have been made aware. Savinuccio also stated that he had always tried to keep his son away from the clan's affairs.

== Personal life ==
Savino Parisi is the father of Tommaso Parisi, known as "Tommy", born on 11 August 1983. Tommaso is a famous rapper and singer in the Bari's music scene, and is considered by the authorities to be a member of his father's clan, having been arrested and involved in legal matters several times.
