= Parisi-Palermiti clan =

Italian organized crime group

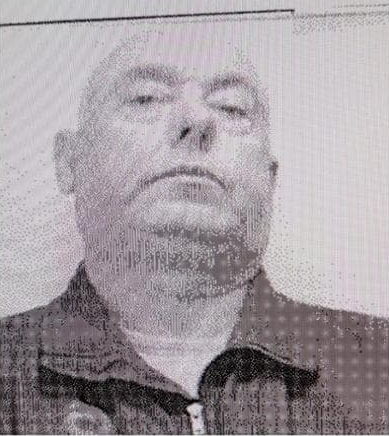
- Mugshot of Eugenio Palermiti, one of the leaders of the clan
- Founded: 1980s
- Founder: Savino Parisi; Eugenio Palermiti
- Founding location: Bari, Apulia, Italy
- Years active: 1980s–present
- Territory: Japigia neighborhood and surrounding areas
- Ethnicity: Apulians
- Activities: Murder, drug trafficking, money laundering, extortion, usury, gambling, bribery
- Allies: Capriati clan Mercante-Diomede clan Di Cosola clan Bellocco 'ndrina Albanian mafia
- Rivals: Strisciuglio clan

The Parisi-Palermiti clan, is a criminal organization, originating from the city of Bari, having its stronghold mainly in the Japigia neighborhood, but with territorial control over many cities in the province of Bari.

== History ==
The organization, historically led by Savino Parisi, known as "Savinuccio ", currently in prison, appeared on the Bari criminal scene in the 1980s due to its control over drug dealing, particularly heroin, in the Japigia neighborhood. With the excessive power of drug dealing and extortion committed over the years by his clan, the boss Parisi would have accumulated a large amount of wealth, partly reinvested in real estate, partly made up of cash. Furthermore, Savinuccio dedicated a separate chapter to the acquisition of "control of economic activities", control centered on the figure of Michele Labellarte, an entrepreneur who died in 2009. According to investigators, the criminal group, however, would not limit itself to making money only with drug trafficking and extortion, but would infiltrate businesses and would also get close to local politics.

In 2017, the police seized 2.5 million euros from Angelo Locorotondo, a man believed to be close to the clan. In 2018, two villas, five racehorses and financial relationships worth over one million euros were seized, attributable to Savinuccio Parisi, mostly registered in the name of compliant front men. In January 2020, Michele Parisi, known as “ gelatina'', brother of Savinuccio Parisi, was arrested on charges of attempted extortion against an entrepreneur.

Since 2017, the Palermiti clan has joined the Parisi clan, giving life to a 'war society', created to support the conflict that broke out in the neighborhood against the 'splitter' group led by Antonio Busco, who tried to take over part of the drug dealing areas managed by the clan. The Palermiti faction is commanded by Eugenio Palermiti, known as "the grandfather", considered the right-hand man of Savinuccio Parisi. However, Palermiti increasingly occupies a dominant position within the clan, since Parisi has been in prison for many years. Eugenio Palermiti would also have had the intuition to coagulate the new bloodthirsty picciotti, recreate his own army, consolidate his hegemonic power and finally infiltrate the most varied nodes of healthy society and economy.

In 2022, the Bari police seized assets for a total of approximately 1 million euros. The assets seized included an individual business, two companies active in the food and beauty sectors, two buildings, three vehicles and numerous financial relationships. Again in 2022, the singer Tommy Parisi, born in 1983 and son of the boss Savinuccio, was sentenced to eight years of imprisonment and a lifelong ban from holding public office for the crime of mafia association.

In February 2024, the police dismantled an operation created by the clan in the coffee trade sector, in which the organization forced bars and commercial activities to sell exclusively the product of companies linked to the Parisis, such as Torregina Caffè, attributable to Tommaso 'Tommy' Parisi and Christopher Luigi Petrone, Raro srl, which had as a "hidden partner" the boss's brother, Massimo Parisi, and Caffè Sartoriale. Again in February 2024, the boss Eugenio Palermiti was arrested, accused of wounding Teodoro Greco in 2013 and of violent and persecutory conduct towards men of the clan to prevent them from speaking to investigators.

In September 2024, the DIA executed a seizure order against a clan representative, worth approximately 3 million euros. The seized assets included 13 properties (including a prestigious building located in the historic center of a municipality in the Bari area), cars, cash, and various financial assets formally registered in the name of a front man but attributable to a clan member.

Again in September 2024, Eugenio Palermiti, then twenty years old, grandson of the eponymous clan boss, was involved in a shooting in a nightclub in Molfetta. A friend of Palermiti was killed in the shooting, while he and three other people were injured. The person responsible for the crime was arrested by the police and is a "stepson" of a member of the Strisciuglio clan, rival of the Parisi-Palermiti. According to the investigations, Palermiti was the real target of the killer. Eugenio Palermiti, who underwent surgery on his humerus at the Policlinico in Bari after the shooting, in addition to being the nephew of the historic boss, is the son of Gianni Palermiti, considered a worthy heir to the succession but whose criminal career was blocked by a life sentence. The young heir of the Palermiti family is also known for posting his life of luxury and excess on social media for years.

In January 2025, Savino Parisi Junior, then 28 years old, son of Giuseppe Parisi (brother of the historic boss Savino), and Eugenio Palermiti, nephew of the boss of the same name, were arrested on charges of carrying and possessing a weapon aggravated by mafia methods and facilitation. According to the investigations, the two heirs of the clan entered the clubs of the region always armed, managing to elude police checks thanks to the help of compliant bouncers, as, according to the investigators, happened at the "Divinae Follia" nightclub in Bisceglie. In February 2025, Savino Parisi Junior was released.

In April 2025, the Carabinieri of the Bari Centro Company executed 21 arrest warrants for individuals definitively convicted of drug trafficking and organized crime. The convictions stem from a complex investigation called 'Astra,' which dismantled a criminal organization operating in Bari and Mola di Bari, linked to the Palermiti faction. The investigations, conducted between 2016 and 2018, uncovered a well-organized drug dealing network, with seizures of drugs and war weapons. The operation led to sentences ranging from 8 months to 18 years, totaling 148 years of imprisonment.

== See also ==
- Organized crime in Italy
- Savino Parisi
- Strisciuglio clan
- Capriati clan
