= Carlo Peter Caputo =

Italian-American gangster and businessman

Carlo Peter Caputo (September 15, 1903 – November 6, 1993) was a Palermo-born purported Italian-American gangster and businessman based in Madison, Wisconsin.

== Early career ==
Arriving in Chicago, Caputo integrated himself into the Chicago Outfit, allegedly working between The Outfit and its offshoot in Milwaukee during the 1930s and 1940s. At some point in the 1940s, Caputo relocated to Madison, Wisconsin, where he settled into the Madison neighborhood of Greenbush, a large enclave of Sicilian and Jewish Immigrants. Caputo quickly purchased real estate in the area including several taverns and restaurants, gaining a reputation as a successful businessman.

=== Later life and indictment ===
Long regarded by the FBI as the head of the Madison branch of La Cosa Nostra, in 1961 Caputo came under indictment from the federal government for tax evasion. The case ended with Caputo serving 30 days in jail and receiving 23 months' probation.

Former FBI Director William Sessions cited Caputo as the mob boss of Madison during a 1988 congressional hearing on organized crime. Despite his brief imprisonment and Sessions' comments, Caputo continued to serve as a prominent member of the Madison business community and contributed to the development of the downtown area.

==== Death ====
Caputo died of natural causes on November 9, 1993. Following his death, Caputo was considered by the FBI to have been the head of America's smallest mafia operation.
