= Capriati clan =

Italian organized crime group

- Founded: 1980s
- Founder: Antonio Capriati
- Founding location: Bari, Apulia, Italy
- Years active: 1980s–present
- Territory: Bari, in particular the historic city centre.
- Ethnicity: Apulians
- Activities: Murder, drug trafficking, money laundering, extortion, usury, gambling
- Allies: Parisi-Palermiti clan Mercante-Diomede clan Di Cosola clan Bellocco 'ndrina
- Rivals: Strisciuglio clan

The Capriati clan is a criminal organization, originating from the city of Bari, operating mainly in the historic centre of the city.

== History ==
Active since the 1980s, the criminal organization has historically been led by Antonio Capriati, known as Tonino, currently in prison where he is serving a life sentence.

The clan is mainly dedicated to extortion and drug dealing, and for a certain period under the leadership of Tonino's nephews, Filippo and Pietro, the group tried to expand into other areas beyond its stronghold in Bari Vecchia, having also committed thefts in the region of Basilicata. Furthermore, the clan also managed to infiltrate a company that manages internal roads in the Port of Bari, and according to the investigations, the Capriati aimed to infiltrate the economic fabric of the city.

In 2018, the then head of the organization, Filippo Capriati, was arrested and sentenced to 16 years in prison. In September 2023, a "top-down and hierarchical" structure was dismantled by the Carabinieri, based on the presence of various territorial structures operating under the aegis of the Capriati clan, which allegedly ensured and managed "upstream" the trafficking of narcotic substances in the South of the Bari area, in the territories of Putignano, Castellana Grotte, Noci, Alberobello, Locorotondo, Acquaviva delle Fonti. 60 people were arrested in the operation. In October 2023, 600,000 euros were seized from the man was the representative of the Capriati clan in the control of the slot machine market and would have used the clan's sums of money for real estate investments and financial, by registering assets to their trustees.

In March 2024, a photo of the mayor of Bari Antonio Decaro appeared on social media, with the sister and niece of the boss Antonino Capriati. The photo caused a stir among the population and political parties, who asked the mayor for explanations. After the photo went viral and appeared in national newspapers, the mayor said that he didn't know who they were and after investigating he discovered that despite belonging to the Capriati family, the women are unrelated to the clan's activities. The niece of the Capriati boss, Annalisa Milzi, denied any relationship between them and the mayor, claiming that the photo was from the Feast of the Patron Saint Saint Nicholas in 2023, and that it was taken after asking the mayor if she could take a selfie with him. On 25 March 2024, the access commission of the Interior Ministry arrived in Bari to evaluate hypotheses of mafia infiltration in the city.

In October 2024, the confiscation of the assets of Vito Martiradonna, known as Vitin l'Enèl, former cashier of the clan, was confirmed. The confiscated assets include two luxury apartments in London, bank accounts, Rolex watches, jewelry and other luxury items. These assets had been discovered by the G.I.C.O. as part of the 2018 investigation, which led to the arrest of 22 people, involved in the creation of a real holding company for illegal gambling that had generated an estimated turnover of €1 billion and also had the support of Tommaso Parisi, son of Savino Parisi, head of the Parisi-Palermiti clan, a historic ally of the Capriati clan.

On January 29, 2025, the cousins Christian and Loreta Capriati were arrested, respectively children of Lello and Mimmo, nephews of Tonino Capriati, and both killed in two different ambushes. Christian and Loreta were in possession of a loaded gun and dozens of doses of cocaine and marijuana.

== See also ==
- Organized crime in Italy
- Società foggiana
- Strisciuglio clan
- Parisi-Palermiti clan
