= Nuova Mala del Brenta =

Italian criminal organization

- Founded: 1970s
- Founded by: Felice Maniero
- Founding location: Campolongo Maggiore, Metropolitan City of Venice, Italy
- Years active: 1970s–1994 (Mala del Brenta), the remnants, broken up into independent gangs known as "Nuova Mala" are primarily involved in drug trafficking, arms dealing, armed robbery
- Territory: Northeast Italy, Veneto, Friuli-Venezia Giulia, Emilia-Romagna), Croatia, Slovenia
- Ethnicity: People of Venetian and Italian descent
- Membership (est.): c. 500 Made members and associates (1970s-1990s)
- Criminal activities: Racketeering, drug trafficking, gambling, kidnapping, extortion, pimping, murder, fraud, loan sharking, bribery, fencing, robbery, car theft and money laundering
- Allies: Cosa Nostra; Nuova Camorra Organizzata (defunct)
- Rivals: Various gangs, mainly Romani, in Veneto

Map highlighting the region of Veneto in northern Italy.

The Nuova Mala del Brenta (NMB), also known as New Brenta Mafia or Venetian Mafia, is a criminal organization based in the Veneto region of Italy. The group is believed to have emerged in the late 1990s as a successor to the original Mala del Brenta, which was active in the area during the 1970s and 1980s.

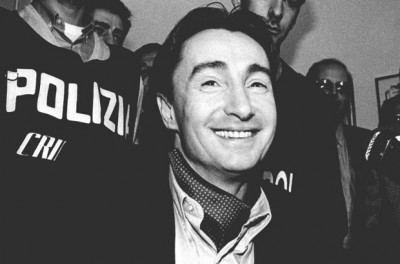
Felice Maniero

The criminal organization's structure is akin to the Cosa Nostra and Camorra model, but more violent. It is considered by the Italian government and Prefecture of Venice as including all the characteristics of Article 416 bis-cp, the legislative definition of a mafia-type organisation with Mafia (Cosa Nostra, 'Ndrangheta, Camorra, Sacra Corona Unita, Società foggiana) affiliations within Italy.

== Original Mala del Brenta ==
The original Mala del Brenta was a powerful criminal organization that operated in the Veneto region during the 1970s and 1980s. The group was involved in a wide range of criminal activities, including drug trafficking, extortion, and money laundering. The group's name was derived from the Brenta Canal, which was used to transport contraband. Felice Maniero was the founder of the Mala del Brenta.

== Criminal panorama of Veneto ==
Before the arrival of these high-calibre Sicilian mobsters, Veneto's crime problem was restricted to various disorganised gangs operating throughout the region. In the 1980s, just before the emergence of the Mala del Brenta, there were already a few organized crime syndicates that would later be incorporated under the central authority of the Mala del Brenta. These organizations included:

- "Clan Giostrai" -- various affiliated groups of nomad criminals, mostly from the provinces of Vicenza, Padova and Venice, of whom a number had a relation to the carnival fair businesses. These were involved in bank heists, robberies, the drug trade, and kidnapping for ransom.
- The "Mestrini" group, based in Mestre, on the immediate Venetian mainland: a powerful group with strong ties to the Mala del Brenta, their most lucrative trade was drug trafficking, but the group was involved in a vast array of criminal enterprises. Most notably, the ownership of many abusive water taxis that would bring foreign tourists to shops and hotels in Venice that were owned by the clans associates. The "zoccolo duro" or top capos of the organisation were: Gino Causin, Gilberto "Lolli" Boatto, Paolo Tenderini, Roberto "Paja" Paggiarin and Paolo Pattarello.
- The "Veneziani", the old criminal underworld of Venice, engaged in the same activities of the "Mestrini": the group was headed by the Rizzi brothers and Giancarlo Millo, nicknamed "The Martian".
- The San Donà di Piave cartel, under the leadership of Silvano Maritan, nicknamed "The President", protégé of the confined Cosa Nostra boss Salvatore Contorno, the rivalry with another cartel based in the same area caused a number of violent confrontations and subsequently placed Maritan as capo of the eastern part of the province of Venice, that is until he gave up a percentage of his assets to Maniero.

== Nuova Mala del Brenta ==
Maniero was captured in Turin in November 1994, and sentenced to 33 years of imprisonment for mafia association, robbery, drug trafficking, kidnapping and murder. In February 1995, he turned state's evidence and his sentence was reduced to 17 years.

The group was largely dismantled in the mid 1990s after 79 members were arrested and convicted. However, a new criminal organization, the Nuova Mala del Brenta, emerged in the region in the late 1990s. The group is believed to have connections to the original Mala del Brenta and is said to be involved in drug trafficking, money laundering, and other criminal activities.

== Affiliations and criminal activity ==
The organisation has had a number of high-level political connections outside Italy (Croatia and Yugoslavia, Malta, Hungary and Austria). At one point, Maniero was a personal friend of the son of the former Croatian president Franjo Tuđman and was involved in the supply of guns to Croatia, in the early 1990s.

The organisation had a firm hold of nearly every criminal venture in the region, from money laundering to loansharking and extortion, but its major source of income was drug dealing; the group bought massive amounts of cocaine directly from the Sicilian and Colombian Mafia, as well as heroin from Turkish drug baron Nvo Berisa, who helped a number of Venetian mobsters in hiding in Turkey, including Felice Maniero and Antonio Pandolfo, the group's second in command.

Its members are exclusively native to the Veneto region, but with a number of associates operating in the region from Cosa Nostra, Camorra and it is believed from the Ndrangheta as well. It is also known that Brenta mafiosi have colluded with Stidda members on a number of occasions involving a number of fraudulent scams at a Maltese casino in 2002.

== Recent years ==
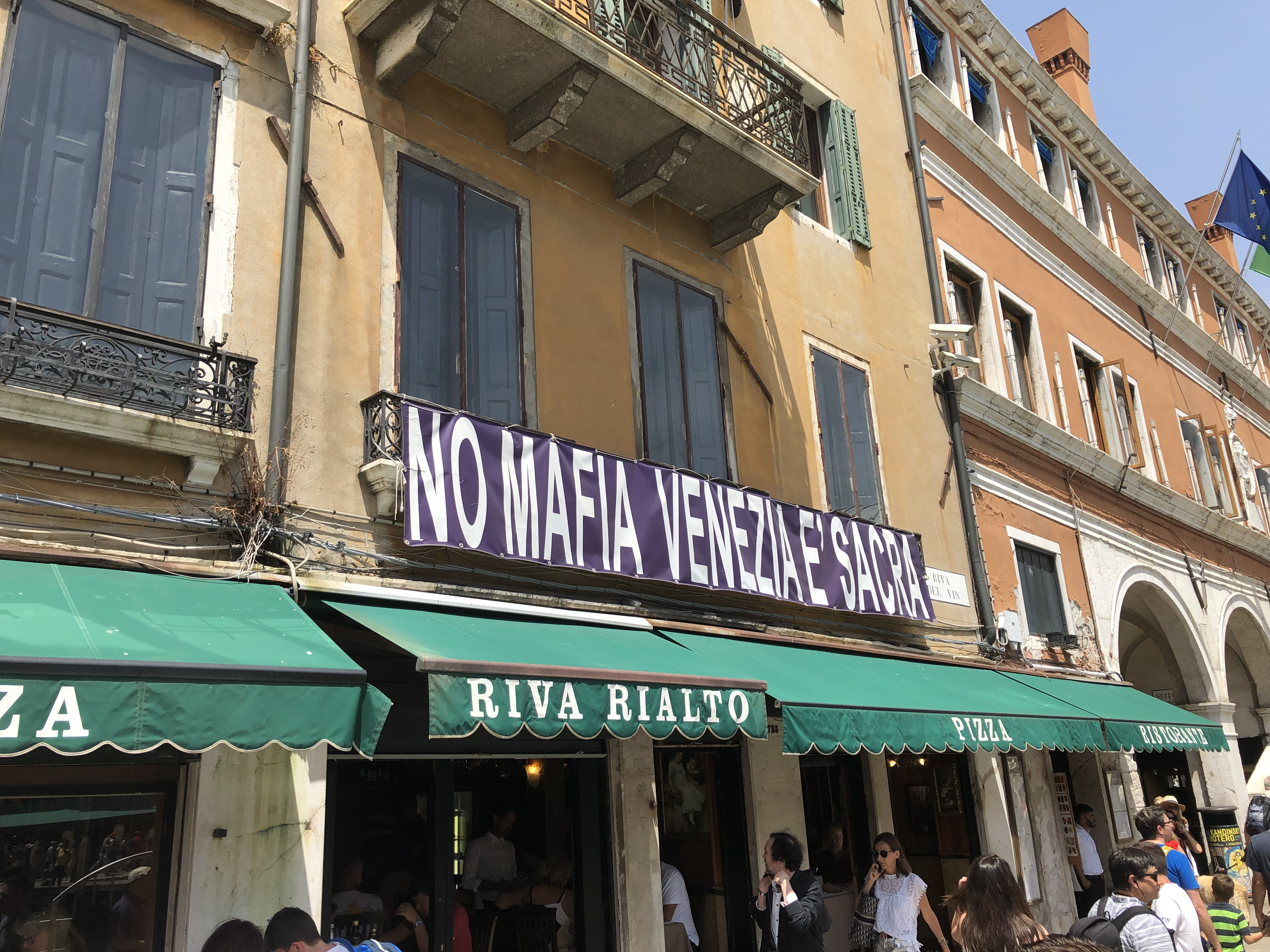
"No Mafia Venezia è Sacra" (No Mafia Venice is Sacred) banner hanging over a restaurant in Venice across from the Rialto Bridge in 2019.

In 2018, Italian authorities arrested several members of the Nuova Mala del Brenta on charges of drug trafficking and money laundering. The group was accused of smuggling large quantities of cocaine into Italy from South America and using sophisticated money laundering techniques to conceal their profits.

In 2021, the group was linked to the murder of a prominent businessman in the Veneto region. The businessman, who was involved in several legitimate businesses, was reportedly targeted by the Nuova Mala del Brenta after he refused to pay extortion money.
