= Albanian mafia =

Criminal organizations based in Albania or composed of ethnic Albanians

- Mafia shqiptare
- Founded: 1990s
- Founding location: Albania
- Years active: Since the late 20th century
- Territory: Territories with established structures with significant operational activities are in Albania, Italy and United Kingdom in Europe, and in Ecuador in South America. The Albanian mafia also operates in other countries with varying degrees of presence.
- Ethnicity: Albanians
- Criminal activities: Arms trafficking, arson, assault, bribery, drug trafficking, extortion, fencing, loan sharking, money laundering, murder, racketeering, robbery, sex trafficking, smuggling, theft, vehicle theft
- Notable members: List of members

Albanian mafia or Albanian organized crime (Albanian: Mafia shqiptare) are the general terms used for criminal organizations based in Albania or composed of ethnic Albanians. Albanian organized crime is active mostly in Europe and South America, but also in various other parts of the world, including the Middle East and Asia. The Albanian criminal groups participate in a diverse range of criminal enterprises including trafficking in drugs, arms, and humans. Due to their close ties with the 'Ndrangheta of Calabria, they control a large part of the billion dollar wholesale cocaine market in Europe and appear to be the primary distributors of cocaine in various European drug hubs including London. Albanian organized crime is characterized by diversified criminal enterprises which, in their complexity, demonstrate a very high criminal capacity.

The Albanian criminal groups has monopolized various international affiliations, from as far east as Israel to as far west as South America. These reports primarily indicate a strong connection between politicians and various Albanian crime groups. According to the Research Institute for European and American Studies (RIEAS), Albanian crime groups are hybrid organizations (i.e. composed of people from various sectors of society), and are often involved in both criminal and political activities.

The Albanian mafia constitutes one of the highest crime generating elements in the world, combining the "traditional" characteristics of organized crime – its rigid internal discipline, its clan structure, its "endogamic closure" (marrying within the organization) which increases the organization's impermeability, and its internal cohesion – with modern and innovative characteristics, such as transnationality. The massive logistic capacity and the diverse nature of Albanian organized crime has facilitated its establishment outside the mother country and its integration with local criminal elements.

== History ==
With the fall of communism in Albania in the early 1990s and the transition to democracy, Albania went through severe political and economic instability. The country faced an economic crisis, and many citizens turned to illicit activities to survive. It was in this environment that the Albanian mafia began to structure itself and expand, particularly in areas like drug trafficking, smuggling, prostitution and human trafficking.

The Albanian mafia took advantage of the lack of government control, the collapse of institutions, and widespread poverty. Proximity to other countries in the region, such as Italy, Greece, and the former Yugoslavia, also helped establish international connections. Many mafia members were involved in the heroin trade from Asia to Europe, as well as arms trafficking and other criminal activities.

In the 1990s and 2000s, Albanian criminal organizations began expanding into other countries, particularly Western Europe. Italy, in particular, became a key focus for the Albanian mafia, with criminal groups present mostly in Central and Northern Italy, in cities like Milan and Rome. The Albanian mafia became involved in drug trafficking, especially heroin and cocaine, and arms trafficking, often collaborating with other international criminal organizations. Albanian criminal groups were highly organized and operated very discreetly, making it difficult for authorities to intervene. Violence, extortion, and threats were frequently used as means of control.

Albanian criminal groups are known for its decentralized structure, with multiple families or clans operating independently but sharing common goals. These clans operate in transnational networks and are famous for their brutality, loyalty among members, and tight control over their criminal activities. Additionally, the Albanian mafia is notorious for its ability to infiltrate legal and political institutions, using corruption to protect its operations. They are highly efficient in drug trafficking, often employing sophisticated methods of transportation and distribution.

== Structure and composition ==
=== Clan hierarchy ===
The typical structure of the Albanian crime groups is hierarchical. A family clan is referred to as a "fis" or a "fare." Families contain an executive committee known as a "Bajrak" and select a high-ranking member for each unit. A unit is led by a "Krye" or "Boss" who selects "Kryetar" or "Underbosses" to serve under them. The Kryetar will then choose a "Mik" or "Friend" who acts as a liaison to members and is responsible for coordinating unit activities.

According to Altin Dumani, Tirana's Anti-Crime Prosecutor's Office Chief, "Albanian criminal groups are characterized by close family and social ties, but without a clear hierarchy. They operate mainly in small groups and in collaboration with local organizations or with other structured Albanian criminal groups."

=== Membership ===
According to Ioannis Michaletos, the family structure is characterised by a strong inner discipline, which is achieved by means of punitive action for every deviation from internal rules. Punishment ensures fear, and fear guarantees unconditional loyalty to the family. Provisions within the family structure allow official laws to be considered secondary, unimportant, and non-binding. Since crime groups are based on blood relations, the number of clan members are limited, and bonds between them tend to be very strong. As a result, infiltrating into the Albanian crime groups is almost impossible. Members of other ethnic groups can be accepted only to execute one time or secondary jobs. The Albanian crime clans are organised in 4–6 or more levels; such a structure enables them to preserve the organisational action capability even in case some of its members or groups are captured.

== Rituals and codes of conduct ==
=== Besa ===
The Albanian mafia uses the term besa, meaning "trust", as a name for their "code of honor". During the recruitment process a member inducted into the Albanian mafia is required to take an oath. The oath is then considered sacred because it is defined as a Besë. Besa is extremely important in Albanian culture, and is considered a verbal contract of trust. Especially in North Albania, when somebody gives someone their Besë, they have given someone their life and are going to protect someone with their life.

Organized crime became widespread in Albania during the early 1990s, after the fall of communism. Blackmail, intimidation and racketeering became commonplace. A 2003 report by the Office of the Special Coordinator of the Stability Pact for South-Eastern Europe remarks that "Albania is the paradise for the illegal trade. Neither state nor police present problem for the drug chiefs: you can buy politicians and it is not rare when a leader of the criminal gang works in some state institution". Albanian crime groups are often involved in both criminal and political activities in order to influence political developments. Albanian Prime Ministers Sali Berisha and Edi Rama have both been linked to organized crime groups in Albania.

== International activity ==
The Albanian mafia is a prominent organized crime group that operates internationally, with a strong presence primarily in Europe, but also in South America, North America and parts of Asia. Its international criminal activities include drug trafficking, human trafficking, arms smuggling, money laundering, and various other illicit enterprises. The group is known for its ability to infiltrate legitimate businesses and has established connections with other transnational criminal organizations, such as the 'Ndrangheta and the other Italian crime groups. The Albanian mafia's influence in global criminal networks continues to grow, making it one of the most feared and well-established criminal groups worldwide.

Albania experienced a rise in gangs and the drug trade following the economic collapse during the 1990s, caused by the pyramid schemes in 1997. The economy's reliance on drug trade and smuggling has led the country to be declared as Europe's only narco-state.

=== China ===
The Albanian mafia has extended its activities into China, which was discovered after Chinese authorities uncovered Albanian mafia activity including drug trafficking and prostitution networks. Reports state that the Albanian gangs are involved in drug transporting to various Chinese cities. Further, after smuggling the drugs, they are involved in human smuggling of Chinese nationals to Europe.

=== Israel ===
The Israeli government has confirmed its concern that Albanian criminal groups has spread its influence in the country's banking system. The Israeli intelligence agency has called for a close cooperation between Israel and Albania to combat money laundering. Justice Ministry General Manager, Dr. Guy Rotkopf noted; "this is an important step in international cooperation between our countries to combat money laundering with the force of law and to deepen relations between Israel and other countries."

=== Australia ===
A lengthy News Corp Australia investigation has found that an Albanian crime group—led by some of Australia's most wanted men—have established "entrenched infiltration" of almost every level of Australian society and according to Australian Federal Police:

European Organised Crime, primarily the Albanian Mafia is now one of the largest organised crime threats to Australia, so entrenched and disciplined and influential in local communities it has made this a serious challenge to crack.

The mostly Australian run group, led by former Kings Cross identity Vaso Ulić, a Montenegrin immigrant who left Australia in 2005 never to return, was now networked to become one of the biggest transnational crime groups in the world importing six tonnes a year into Australia alone but many more to and from other destinations from South Africa to Europe, China, Nigeria and the Americas with law enforcers from notably the United Kingdom, United States and Italy involved in their pursuance.

Vaso Ulic is a 55-year-old ethnic Montenegrin who migrated to Australia in 1979. Within a few years, he was working as a small-time foot soldier running drugs and cash along the Golden Mile of Kings Cross. He is now considered a drug kingpin, and it is reported that few drug consignments enter Australia without his knowledge or permission.

It has been confirmed the prosecutions office in Montenegro, where Ulic is residing, has an extensive file on Ulic and other figures in the country as part of an international arrest warrant to break the cartel up.

An internal police assessment relayed to the Federal Government claims their criminality now extends worldwide with direct Australian-Albanian Organised Crime links to notorious Mexican and Colombian clans and cartels and Asian triads including the 14K group, South African crime lords and Italian and Dutch criminal groups, with predominantly Melbourne, Sydney, Queensland, South Australia & Tasmania using motorcycle gangs as part of the national distribution & enforcement network for the Albanians.

=== Europe ===
==== Belgium ====
The Albanian mafia has deep roots in Belgium, and was a topic of a special programme on Belgian RTBF Channel One. Reporters tried to investigate the roots of Albanian organised crime but have complained that it is too difficult to penetrate the structure and organisation of the Albanian crime groups, although they agreed that the Albanian mafia acts on the model of the Italian one, whose crime is part of the "activities of entire families" and which has a clearly defined hierarchy.

In 1989, former Belgian Prime Minister Paul Vanden Boeynants was kidnapped in a plot organised by Basri Bajrami. Bajrami was acknowledged by authorities as a member of the Albanian mafia at that time.

The Albanian crime groups in Brussels has monopoly over activities such as "narcotics and arms deals", according to Belgian sources. In Antwerp, the Kosovar-Albanian crime groups are affiliated with the Hells Angels and has rivalled Russian and Ukrainian mafia groups for control of the prostitution and racketeering market.

Safet Bajri also known as "Safet Rustemi" is considered by Belgian authorities as a top criminal, involved in drug trafficking business and active between the country and Albania.

==== France ====
The Albanian mafia in France is described as having a monopoly over many criminal transactions including arms and drug trafficking. The Albanian mafia has a strong foothold in France, which is a key strategy as other primary transactions are overseen in neighbouring countries by different crime families and clans. French media has stated that "In many cities of France, there is a network of the Albanian mafia who are involved in narcotics trafficking and prostitution. It is a highly organized network and is very difficult to find their roots and penetrate it".

==== Germany ====
The Albanian mafia is involved in smuggling heroin and cocaine into Germany in collusion with Italian, Armenian and Chechen mafia groups. The Osmani Brothers are, according to the German Federal Intelligence Service (Bundesnachrichtendienst), the "most important figures of organized crime in Hamburg and other cities in Germany".

==== Greece ====
A 2013 report by the Greek security services and Greek police on Albanian organized crime in the Hellenic Republic concluded that the Albanian crime groups controls approximately fifty percent of human trafficking, eighty percent of the retail distribution of heroin, and ninety percent of the importation of illegal small arms in Greece, and that about fifty percent of armed robberies of homes and businesses in the country were committed by Albanians. The analysis also drew links between Albanian nationalism and organized crime.

==== Italy ====
The geographic vicinity, the accessibility to the EU through Italy, and the ties with the Calabrian and Apulia criminality have all contributed to the expansion of the Albanian criminality on the Italian scenario.

Further factors relative to the economy have rendered the Albanian criminality even more competitive. In fact, some organisations which reached Italy in the early 1990s, infiltrated the Lombardy narco-traffic network run by the 'ndrangheta. Albanian mafia leaders have reached stable agreements with the Italian criminal organisations, also with the mafia, so have gained legitimacy in many illegal circuits, diversifying their activities to avoid reasons of conflict with similar host structures. So, Albanian drug trafficking has emerged in Apulia, Sicily, Calabria and Campania, expanding its drug trafficking operations also in Lazio, Lombardy and Emilia-Romagna. The Albanian mafia is highly involved in the drug trafficking in Rome, being considered by the investigations as one of the most important organizations active in the Italian capital. In towns on the outskirts of Rome, in particular in Velletri, the Albanians were also considered for a time to be the main organization dedicated to drug trafficking. One of the most notorious and important criminals of the Albanian mafia operating in and around Rome was Elvis Demce, arrested in 2022 and sentenced to 18 years in jail.

The Albanian mafia is very active in the drug business in the city of Bari, where it established alliances with the city's crime groups, in particular with the Strisciuglio clan. Albanian criminal groups are also responsible for trafficking weapons of war into Bari and its province. Among the figures of the Albanian mafia operating in Bari is Aleksander Hodaj, responsible for massive heroin trafficking between Albania and the city.

Among the most important Albanian mobsters active in Italy are: Arben Zogu: boss of a drug trafficking crime group active in Rome. Ismail Rebeshi: drug lord active in the city of Viterbo and in its province. Ermal Arapaj: drug lord active in the region of Lazio. Dorian Petoku: one of the most notorious Albanian drug traffickers active in Rome. Janku Kristo Dhimitraq also known as "Janku Kristo", born in 1969, involved in a big drug trafficking scheme with the Barese Strisciuglio clan.

===== Trading route =====
The Albanian mafia reportedly uses specific trading routes to transport narcotics and illegal immigrants to Italy. Their southern route is via Montenegro and Albania. Access is then gained to Italy by boat.

===== Sicilian Mafia – Cosa Nostra =====
Since the beginning of the 1990s, Italy has been clamping down hard on the Sicilian Mafia. According to the deputy director of the Center for Strategic and International Studies (CSIS), at the end of the 1990s the mafia sought to survive this crackdown by forming a "symbiotic" relationship with the Albanian crime families known as fares, who provided the struggling Sicilians a hand in a number of services in their operations across Italy. Today, both Sicilian mafia groups and the 'Ndrangheta are believed to have franchised out prostitution, gambling, and drug dealing in territories along the Adriatic coast to the Albanians. One CSIS report even claimed that this partnership had proved so successful that the Sicilian mafia established a 'headquarters' in Vlorë, a coastal town in southern Albania at the close of the 1990s.

Albanian clandestine immigrants started arriving at Italian ports in 1991. By 1997, the immigration had come under the control of the Albanian and Italian criminal groups, tightening relationships between them. The Albanian criminal gangs have recently created in Sicily relations of interest with the Cosa Nostra.

===== Sacra Corona Unita =====
The Albanian mafia seems to have established good working relationships with the Italian organized crime groups, On 27 July 1999 police in Durrës (Albania), with Italian assistance arrested one of the godfathers of the "Sacra Corona Unita", one of the main crime groups based in the region of Apulia. This Albanian link seems to confirm that the Sacra Corona Unita and the Albanian mafia are "partners" in Apulia and delegate several criminal activities. Thus, in many areas of Italy, the market for cannabis, prostitution, and smuggling is run mainly by Albanians.

===== Camorra =====
Roberto Saviano, the Italian writer, an expert on the Napolitan Camorra in particular and the Italian mafia in general, spoke of the Albanian mafia as a "no longer foreign mafia" to Italy and stressed that the Albanians and Italians have a "brotherly" relationship between each other. Saviano notes that the Camorra form greater affinity with the Albanian crime families than with other criminal groups from Eastern Europe.

According to the Direzione Investigativa Antimafia, the Albanian mafia has alliances with many Camorra clans, including with the Mazzarella clan and the Amato-Pagano clan, both from Naples and with the Serino clan, from Salerno.

===== 'Ndrangheta =====
In an Albanian television station Top Channel TV, Saviano went on to say that the Albanian and Italian factions are "one of the same", and that they don't consider each other as foreigners. Links to Calabria's mafia, the Ndrangheta, exist in Northern Italy. Several key figures of the Albanian mafia seem to reside frequently in the Calabrian towns of Africo, Platì, and Bovalino (Italy), fiefs of the 'Ndrangheta.\

According to the German Federal Intelligence Service, the Bundesnachrichtendienst (BND), in a leaked report to a Berlin newspaper, states that the 'Ndrangheta "act in close cooperation with Albanian crime groups in moving weapons and narcotics across Europe's porous borders".

===== Società foggiana =====
According to numerous reports, the brutal criminal organisation from Foggia, known as the Società foggiana has several contacts with the Albanian mafia, particularly regarding to the drug trafficking business, also creating drugs routes from Albania to Foggia. In 2020 the Italian police noticed that there is a scheme in the city of San Severo, in the Province of Foggia, between the Albanians and the Società foggiana.

==== Netherlands ====
According to Dutch police, Albanian crime groups lead the importation of cocaine from South America, the transshipment via the port of Rotterdam, and the further distribution to other European countries from Amsterdam. In addition to cocaine trafficking, the Albanian mafia in the Netherlands is also engaged in human trafficking and property fraud. In June 2019, the government of the Netherlands requested the suspension of visa-free travel for Albanians, citing claims the Albanian mafia is free to move across Europe because of the visa-free European Union regime.

==== Scandinavia ====
Kosovar-Albanian criminals first immigrated to Scandinavia during the Kosovo War of the late 1990s. The Albanian mafia, along with the Serbian mafia, controls heroin, weapon and sex trafficking in Denmark, Norway and Sweden. Law enforcement authorities estimate that various Albanian crime groups may each smuggle as much as 440 pounds of heroin a year into Scandinavia. Albanian crime groups in the region are also involved in armed robberies and heists. According to Kim Kliver, chief investigator for organised crime with the Danish National Police, "The ethnic Albanian mafia is very powerful and extremely violent. If you compare them to the Italian Mafia, the Albanians are stronger and not afraid of killing."

Naser Xhelili was coined by Swedish authorities as the "Albanian Connection" in Sweden. The Xhelili clan operations include drugs and arms trafficking in and around Sweden.

==== Spain ====
According to Spanish authorities, the Albanian mafia is composed of powerful organised factions. In a report by Spanish authorities, the factions have infiltrated banks and industrial estates. They are very active in Madrid and Costa Del Sol. Fejzulla Haredin, a drug baron and head of a Kosovar-Albanian criminal organization, was on the list of 'Europe's Most Wanted' criminals until his arrest in Madrid in 2024.

==== Switzerland ====
Geneva Deputy Public Prosecutors state that the Albanian mafia is one of the most powerful ones among eight identified mafias in the world. The Geneva deputy public prosecutors also added that the Albanian mafia "is laundering a part of income in Geneva economy, restaurants, bars, real estate and cabarets".

==== United Kingdom ====
Albanian gangs are believed to be largely behind sex trafficking, migrant smuggling, as well as working with Turkish gangs in Southend-on-Sea, who control the heroin trade in the United Kingdom. Although specifically known for sex trafficking, particularly in the UK, it's been said that the Albanian mafia's primary illegal business in Europe and the UK in terms of profit margins is now cocaine trafficking.

In 2012, Vice squad officers estimated that "Albanians now control more than 75 per cent of the country's brothels and their operations in London's Soho alone are worth more than £15 million a year." They were said to be present in every big city in the UK as well as in many smaller ones including Telford and Lancaster, after having fought off rival criminals in turf wars. Associate groups within the organizations are said to hide their criminal activities within restaurants, bars, and clubs in an attempt to remain undercover.

Albanian gangsters were also involved in the largest cash robbery in British crime history, the £53 million Securitas heist in 2006.

According to the Scottish Crime and Drug Enforcement Agency (SCDEA), Albanian crime groups have muscled in on the drug and vice trades within the Scottish underworld. The SCDEA notes that Albanian crime groups have established a foothold in arms and drugs trafficking in Scotland.

Albanian mafia in the UK is heavily involved in prostitution and together with Turkish mafia control more than 70% of prostitution market in London.

In the last few years Albanian mafia was involved more in drug trafficking (Hellbanianz) than in prostitution and they sold more than 500,000 kilograms of drugs in London alone. Due to their expansive and deep involvement in drug trading, the Albanian Mafia has climbed its way to the top of a five billion euro market (US$5.3 billion). The group uses its connections in South America to ship high quality, low price cocaine, heroin, and marijuana to European countries, specifically the United Kingdom. An article in The Guardian noted that "the latest UK criminal threat assessment says that the Albanians are unusually skilled at developing relationships and 'forging links with other OCGs [organized crime gangs].'" The cooperation between Albanians and other existing groups has aided in the rapid growth of drug trafficking throughout the United Kingdom's residential regions.

In November 2023, an Albanian criminal organization led by brothers Edmund and Edward Haziri faced a Police raid. A smartphone was recovered and law enforcement bypassed the Lock screen unlocking troves of sensitive information related to their operations.

In April 2024, The Times newspaper claimed that the money from Albanian gangs' drugs trade in the UK was turning Tirana into a 'miniature Dubai'.

Among the most important Albanian criminals in UK are: Luan Plakici: the "Vice King" of the Albanian crime groups in the UK who was jailed for 10 years (later increased to 23 years) for trafficking women after promising them good jobs, Erald Mema a notorious drug trafficker and Fatjon Dauti also a drug trafficker.

=== North America ===
==== Canada ====
The Albanian mafia is firmly established in Canadian cities, such as Toronto, Montreal and Vancouver. Albanians are involved in various white collar activities, such as real estate and health care fraud. Furthermore, they are engaged in cross-border activity between the United States and Canada, which includes drug smuggling and money laundering.

A Canadian Security Intelligence Service report noted that although organised crime in Canada has shifted to more multi-ethnic and loosely based structures, the term "mafia" is used only to identify the "big three," which have hierarchical structures that are ethnically, racially, and culturally homogeneous: the Italian, Albanian, and Russian mafias.

==== United States ====
In the United States, the term "Albanian Mafia" may include or refer specifically to various Albanian-American organized crime groups, such as the Rudaj Organization and the Albanian Boys, both based in New York City. Albanian criminals started to be active in the country in the mid-80s, mostly participating in low-level crimes, such as burglaries and robberies. Later, most of those Albanian gangs would become affiliated with Cosa Nostra crime families before eventually growing strong enough to operate their own organisations.

The Albanian gangs in the United States has been thought to greatly increase their dominant power and is one of the most violent criminal organisations in operation, particularly with their strong connections in the European Union.

During investigations conducted by FBI experts in the city of New York and surrounding areas against the Albanian mafia, it was noted that the Albanian mafia was too widespread and too secretive to penetrate. Furthermore, although there have been a number of operations performed by the FBI to destroy organised crime such as Italian and Russian factions, the Albanian mafia continues to be widespread in New York in a relatively high number.

=== Central and South America ===
==== Honduras ====
According to WikiLeaks reports, Albanian crime groups are affiliated with various South American politicians, and have set in motion to move their hidden assets in various banks. The WikiLeaks report goes on to state that Albanian crime groups are preying heavily in Central America, where all roads lead to Colombian cocaine. Albanian crime groups are laundering money through banks in Honduras and investing a large amount in construction projects to further gain influence in South America.

==== Ecuador ====
The Albanian mafia has made its presence felt in Ecuador, primarily through its involvement in the country’s drug trafficking industry. Ecuador’s strategic location, nestled between Colombia and Peru, two of the world’s largest cocaine producers, makes it an important transit point for drug shipments to international markets, particularly Europe. The Albanian crime groups, with its well-established networks in the drug trade, has played a significant role in facilitating the movement of cocaine from Ecuador to Europe, where the organization has a strong foothold.

One of the ways the Albanian crime groups operates in Ecuador is through partnerships with local criminal groups, often Colombian and Mexican cartels, but also with local gangs, to ensure that drug shipments move smoothly through the country. Their involvement in the drug trade is marked by the establishment of networks that control distribution routes, as well as logistical operations that help to move drugs from Ecuador’s ports and airports to Europe.

In addition to trafficking, the Albanian grime groups has been linked to money laundering activities in Ecuador. They often invest in legitimate businesses such as real estate and hospitality to clean the proceeds of their illicit trade. This helps them blend in with the local economy while continuing to fund and expand their criminal operations. While the Albanian gangsters operates discretely, its influence has not gone unnoticed. Moreover, the Albanian clans are known for using corruption as a means to protect its operations in the country. They may seek to bribe local law enforcement, government officials, or other authorities to shield their activities from investigation or interference, thereby ensuring that their operations continue uninterrupted. Overall, the Albanian crime clan’s influence in Ecuador is primarily linked to the drug trade, where they act as facilitators between local production and international distribution. Their operations contribute to the broader challenges faced by the country, including corruption, violence, and the growth of organized crime networks.

Among the most important Albanian criminals operating in Ecuador are: Remzi Azemi, Ilir Hidri (killed in 2017), Adriatik Tresa (killed in 2020), Gentjan Meta and Artur Rrapaj.

Numerous analyst and media reports cited the expanding presence of the Albanian mafia as a significant factor contributing to the 2024 conflict in Ecuador.

According to a BBC investigation from 2025, the Albanian mafia has established itself as one of the most powerful drug trafficking networks in Europe by expanding its operations into Ecuador, a key transit country for cocaine coming from Colombia and Peru. The Albanian groups work closely with local gangs such as the Latin Kings, using bribery, threats, and violence to control the supply chain. Corrupt police officers, port workers, and transport staff are often involved, knowingly or under duress. Ecuadorian gang members, recruited by a corrupt officer, manage logistics at the ports and are paid thousands of dollars per shipment, though refusal can mean death. European demand continues to fuel the crisis, while fake export companies serve as fronts for smuggling operations. The surge in drug trafficking has led to record seizures and unprecedented violence, with January 2025 marking Ecuador’s deadliest month in years. Yet, according to the investigation, weak governance, economic struggles after the pandemic, and previously lax immigration policies have allowed the Albanian mafia to infiltrate the country deeply, turning Ecuador into a critical node in the global cocaine trade.

== Groups ==
- Kompania Bello: Considered the most powerful crime group of the Albanian mafia and one of the most active and sophisticated cocaine trafficking networks in Europe. Led by Dritan Rexhepi, a key figure who operated from Ecuador, the group was deeply involved in smuggling large quantities of cocaine from South America to Europe. This highly organized syndicate controlled the entire drug trafficking chain — from negotiating directly with South American cartels to distributing cocaine across European countries such as Italy, the Netherlands, the United Kingdom, among others. In a groundbreaking international investigation spanning five years, law enforcement authorities in 10 countries, including Italy, the Netherlands, Albania, and Spain, coordinated a series of raids that resulted in the arrest of over 100 members of Kompania Bello. The operation, dubbed Los Blancos, was the culmination of meticulous planning and cooperation between Europol, Eurojust, and judicial authorities. It led to the seizure of nearly 4 tonnes of cocaine and over €5.5 million in cash. Rexhepi’s operation utilized encrypted communications to bypass detection, and the group employed a sophisticated smuggling method, hiding cocaine in vehicles with secret compartments. Additionally, they laundered their illicit profits through the underground "fei ch’ien" remittance system, allowing them to transfer millions of euros without leaving traceable evidence. Despite his arrest in 2014 and a prison sentence in Ecuador, Rexhepi continued to lead the cartel from behind bars, maintaining a global network that stretched across Europe, South America, and the Middle East. The dismantling of Kompania Bello is considered one of the largest operations against Albanian organized crime in Europe and highlights the vast international reach and operational sophistication of modern drug trafficking organizations.
- Banda e Lushnjës: The infamous "Lushnje gang," led by Alfred Shkurti, also known as Aldo Bare, became notorious in the 1990s for its violent and ruthless criminal activities in the city of Lushnjë. The gang's main adversary was Artur Daja, and their deadly conflict began in 1996. Aldo Bare's brother, Ramadan Shkurti, was murdered in 1997, sparking a bloody cycle of revenge. In retaliation, Aldo Bare formed the "Lushnje gang," which included key figures like Ilir Stergu, Afrim Hoxha, Arben Borici, and Enver Dondollaku. The gang's violent spree continued with a series of brutal murders. In 1997, they killed Xhevat Demiri, a friend of Daja, and Nimet Zeneli. The gang's reign of terror included more killings in 1998, such as the murders of Masar Aliu, Idajet Beqiri, and Luan Bilbili, all connected to Daja. On 21 October 1998, the gang finally achieved their ultimate goal when they murdered Artur Daja in the village of Grabian, burned his body, and displayed his severed head in Lushnje, symbolizing their brutal victory. Aldo Bare’s criminal activities continued beyond the 1990s. He was connected to other crimes, including the bombing of the Lushnja football stadium in 2000, the murder of police inspector Klejdi Bano, and the killings of Klodian Haxhiu and businessman Baki Taullau in 2005. Bare is also suspected of being involved in other unsolved murders, including the killings of former SHIK head Bashkim Shkurti and former vice mayor Drago Voshtima in 1998. Under Bare’s leadership, the Lushnja gang ruled the Lushnjë region with terror until 2006, when he was arrested in Macedonia and extradited to Albania. His violent reign lasted nearly a decade, leaving a legacy of fear and bloodshed in the city.
- Klani Xhakja: notorious criminal organization based in the village of Sukth in Durrës. Led by Ilir Xhakja, the gang has been involved in a wide range of illegal activities, including murders, drug trafficking, arms smuggling, and prostitution, both in Albania and Italy. Ilir Xhakja’s criminal career dates back to the early 1990s, with a history of violence and involvement in high-profile crimes. In 1994, Ilir Xhakja was involved in a shooting incident in a local establishment, which led to his arrest but eventual release. The case remained unsolved, and the shell casings found at the crime scene matched those from the murders of Gentian Gjoka and Petrit Lyti in 1998. In the same year, the gang is believed to have been involved in the murder of Qerim Maloku, a crime that was connected to a weapons cache found years later. The Xhakja Gang's involvement in further murders, including the killing of E. Shega in 1998, adds to their violent history, often driven by personal vendettas related to human trafficking and other illicit activities. In 1999, the gang launched an attack on the Maloku family, using military-grade weapons, resulting in widespread destruction. Despite being arrested by special forces, the gang members were released after six months, suggesting possible corruption within the local justice system. In 2003, Ilir Xhakja and his associates killed Rudin Shahini as part of a revenge plot. The weapons used in this crime were linked to previous murders. The gang’s influence persisted into the 2000s, with ongoing criminal activities, including drug trafficking, which contributed to violent clashes with rival groups. A failed assassination attempt on two members of the gang in 2006 further highlighted the tensions within the criminal underworld of Durres. The Xhakja Gang has remained a dangerous force in the region, leveraging corruption and violence to maintain control over illegal enterprises. Despite numerous investigations, many of their crimes remain unsolved, and their ability to evade justice has only strengthened their notoriety.
- Banda e Durrësit: Named after the city of Durrës, where the group is located, it was formed in 1998, was led by Lulzim Berisha and involved members such as Plaurent Dervishaj, Adriatik Colin, Klodian Saliu, and Ilir Xhunga. The gang's first major crime was the murder of Dritan Sallaku. In 2006, seven people were arrested, including four hitmen, one of whom, Adriatik Coli, cooperated with authorities and provided detailed testimony. His information helped compile a file detailing several murders from 1998 to 2005.The gang's activities were driven by internal divisions, with revenge killings. In 2005, Ilir Kolgjini, a known associate of Berisha, was murdered, allegedly organized by Indrit Dokle, a former ally and rival of Berisha. The prosecution documented over 10 murders with 11 victims, all linked to the Durrës gang.
- Banda e Lazaratit: Its a notorious and long-standing criminal group based in the village of Lazarat, located in southern Albania. This group has been involved in various illegal activities, including large-scale drug trafficking, primarily the cultivation and distribution of cannabis. It is believed that the organization was formed during the chaotic period of the 1997 Albanian civil unrest and has grown into one of the most powerful and resilient criminal enterprises in the country. The Lazarat gang operates with a high level of secrecy and is known for its strong familial ties, with many of its members belonging to the Aliko family. Over the years, the group has maintained a near-impenetrable hold over the region, making it resistant to law enforcement efforts for over 14 years. The gang's criminal activities are not limited to drug trafficking; they have been linked to multiple murders, including targeted assassinations and violent confrontations with police forces. In addition to their domestic criminal endeavors, some members of the Lazarat gang have extended their operations internationally, with reported activities in countries such as Italy, Spain, Belgium and Ecuador.The gang's persistent criminal activities have made it one of the most dangerous and influential organized crime groups in the Balkans. Despite attempts by law enforcement to dismantle their operations, the Lazarat gang remains a significant challenge for Albanian authorities.

== Notable members ==
- Alfred Shkurti (also known as Aldo Bare) – is the boss of one of the most notorious criminal syndicates in Albania known as the "Banda e Lushnjës" ("the Lushnja Band"). According to Albanian authorities, "Lushnja Band" is one of the most notorious organized crime groups based which has international operations.
- Elvis Demce – One of the most important Albanian mafia bosses active in Italy. Mainly active in the Lazio region. A brutal and ambitious figure in the Albanian criminal underworld in Rome, Elvis Demce sought to dominate the drug trade following the death of his close associate, Fabrizio Piscitelli (Diabolik). Demce was involved in violent extortion, drug trafficking with international cartels, and intense rivalries, particularly with Ermal Arapaj, another Albanian criminal. Their conflict escalated into shootings and arson, as Demce aimed to expand his control over the Lazio region. His ruthless tactics and desire to become the top criminal in the area led to multiple violent confrontations until his arrest.
- Lul Berisha – is the leader of a notorious clan based in Durrës, Albania. Known as "Banda e Lul Berishes", the clan, by its complex structure is engaged in moving drug and arms trafficking and other criminal activities throughout Europe. According to German and Albanian authorities, the clans international drug and arms trafficking spans to Turkey, Bulgaria, Italy, and Germany.
- Artur Ndreka also known as "the boss" – born in 1987, a prominent figure in the Albanian crime scene in Rome, Italy, having risen through the ranks under the protection of notorious Albanian criminals like Arben Zogu, Dorian Petoku, and Petrit Bardhi. He controlled drug trafficking in areas like Acilia and Vitinia in Lazio, running a well-organized operation with a rigid hierarchy. His criminal empire collapsed after a detailed investigation by the Italian authorities, leading to his arrest and that of his brother, Mark. Ndreka was seen as a powerful figure, connected to high-level Albanian crime networks.
- Ervis Martinaj – a notorious figure in Albania’s criminal underworld, involved in various illegal activities including organized gambling, threats, and murder accusations. He gained widespread attention following a 2018 incident where he survived an assassination attempt that killed his associate, Fabjol Gaxha. Despite being arrested, Martinaj was released in 2019 on a 50 million lek bail due to insufficient evidence. He founded several gambling businesses, but some of them were shut down after a police operation. He has faced numerous legal challenges, including accusations of offering bribes to witnesses and involvement in organized crime, and was later implicated in a murder-for-hire scheme. Martinaj has been missing since 9 August 2022 with no traces, Faik Martinaj who is his uncle, has publicly claimed Ervis to be dead and has blamed Edi Rama for playing a role in his death.
- Franc Çopja also known as "Franc Gergely" – notorious drug lord who built a vast criminal empire spanning Europe. Starting from humble beginnings in Elbasan, Albania, he rose through the ranks of organized crime, founding the "Çopja clan" involved in drug trafficking, arms smuggling, and money laundering. His operations were global, with major drug shipments passing through European ports. He relocated to Dubai, living in luxury while orchestrating his illegal activities. However, after a violent rivalry with the "Alibej clan" and extensive investigations, he was arrested in Dubai, UAE in September 2023. His extradition to Belgium marked the end of his reign, as his criminal empire collapsed, leading to his prosecution for numerous crimes, including drug trafficking and murder.
- Gëzim Çela also known as "The Baron" – former police officer, he became one of Europe's most notorious drug traffickers, heavily involved in the cocaine and heroin trade. After serving in the Special Police Forces until 1997, his life took a criminal turn as he became a key player in smuggling narcotics from the Middle East to Europe, using his villa in Fushë Kuqe as a hub for mixing and distributing drugs. Known for his involvement in organized crime, Çela was convicted for "exploitation of prostitution" and later faced charges for falsifying medical records to avoid imprisonment. Despite being released on health grounds, he escaped police custody when his house was surrounded. He also received an 11-year prison sentence and a €150,000 fine from an Italian court.
- Kreshnik Farruku also known as "Budlla" – considered one of the most dangerous Albanian drug traffickers, leader of the "Farruku crime group" and suspected of multiple mafia-related murders. He was wanted internationally by Italy for leading a violent criminal gang involved in a series of robberies. Spanish authorities had been investigating him since 2007. Farruku’s criminal activity began in Albania with violent clashes between the Farruku and Kërtalla crime groups, leading to numerous incidents in Albania and the Netherlands. Despite several assassination attempts on his life, including a 2015 attack in Tirana, Farruku managed to survive. In 2010, he was arrested while attempting to traffic cocaine to Italy, and after escaping prison in 2014, he returned to drug trafficking, particularly in Amsterdam.
- Arbër Çekaj – established a banana-trading company in Ecuador, which he used to conceal drugs in cargo shipments. He was convicted of participating in a structured criminal group and international drug trafficking.
- Dritan Rexhepi – "the Cocaine Tzar", leader of the Albanian crime syndicate "Kompania Bello", ran a massive cocaine trafficking network from his prison cell in Ecuador. Despite being incarcerated since 2014, he controlled the entire drug supply chain from South America to Europe, working with major cartels and criminal groups. His syndicate, involved in trafficking millions of euros worth of cocaine, was dismantled in 2020 through the Los Blancos operation, but Rexhepi's influence and criminal network remain significant, showcasing his ability to manage operations from prison.
- Dritan Gjika – Albanian cocaine kingpin in Ecuador, allegedly led a major international cocaine trafficking operation centered in this country. He built his empire by using legitimate businesses and corrupt connections with influential Ecuadorian officials, including former police chief Tannya Varela. His network smuggled tons of cocaine from Colombia to Europe, laundered money, and avoided direct involvement in drug handling. Following a large-scale law enforcement operation in 2024, much of his network was dismantled, but Gjika remains on the run, and some of his business ventures continue despite his absence.
- Princ Dobroshi – Kosovar criminal who, in the 1990s, trafficked drugs in Europe and arms to the Kosovo Liberation Army.

== In popular culture ==
- The Albanian Mob appear in the 2008 video game Grand Theft Auto IV and its expansion packs, The Lost and Damned and The Ballad of Gay Tony, all three set within the fictional Liberty City (based on New York). They mainly operate in the Hove Beach district of Broker (Brooklyn), and Little Bay in Bohan (Bronx), and engage in loan sharking, extortion, stick ups, and credit card fraud. They serve as hired guns for more powerful criminal syndicates in the city, mainly the Ancelotti crime family. The Albanians serve as the main antagonists during the early stages of GTA IV, until the player scares them away by killing their leader, Dardan Petrela. Later, the player is tasked with sabotaging the Albanian Mob's partnership with the Ancelotti family by leading several attacks against the latter while making it look like the Albanians' handiwork.
- One of the main crime bosses in Gangs of London is Luan Dushaj (played by Orli Shuka), the head of the powerful Albanian mafia in London, England and one of the associates of Wallace family (or Wallace Organisation), the main crime syndicate in Gangs of London.
- TV series Besa has its main narrative line placed in the world of Albanian mafia.
- TV series Law & Order: Organized Crime The first 8 episodes of season 2 is an "arc" where Detective Elliot Stabler (Christopher Meloni) goes deep undercover into the New York Albania Mafia.
- The Lee Child novel Blue Moon features an Albanian gang operating in an unnamed American city.

== See also ==
- Illegal drug trade
- Crime in Albania
- Crime in Kosovo
