= Stidda =

Criminal organization in Sicily, Italy

- Founding location: Southern Sicily
- Years active: 1980s-present
- Territory: Agrigento, Caltanissetta, Gela, Vittoria, Niscemi
- Ethnicity: Sicilians
- Membership: ca.2,000 members
- Criminal activities: Racketeering fraud gambling extortion murder illegal drug trade
- Allies: 'Ndrangheta; Camorra; Cosa Nostra
- Rivals: Cosa Nostra (until the end of 1990s)

The Stidda (Sicilian for 'star'; pronounced [ˈstiɖːa]) is a Sicilian Mafia-type criminal organization and criminal society centered in the central-southern part of Sicily. Members are known as stiddari or stiddaroli. It is most active in the rural parts of southern Sicily and is a rival to the Cosa Nostra, originating as a dissident offshoot group of the Sicilian Cosa Nostra. Some members have a star tattooed on their bodies.

== History ==
Little is known of the origins of the organization, though it is believed to have come about in a similar fashion to the Mafia, in the same rural environment of Sicily. Unlike the Mafia, however, the Stidda was mostly rural and low-profile until the 1980s, when it became somewhat more expansionist and started moving into the cities, bringing the two Sicilian groups into competition with one another. It differs from the Mafia by the fact that it is not based on an honor system but is interested only in criminal activities and the resulting profits.

The Stidda came into public view when Cosa Nostra pentito Francesco Marino Mannoia spoke about it in 1989. Later another Mafia member Leonardo Messina told his own view. According to their testimonies, Stidda is an organization that was founded by former members of the Cosa Nostra during the Second Mafia War of the early 1980s. They had been expelled due to disobedience or, in a couple of cases, even marrying a relative of a police officer. Many of the original stiddari were followers of the murdered Mafia-boss Giuseppe Di Cristina.

The Stidda was particularly strong in southern Sicily around the towns of Agrigento, Caltanissetta, Gela, Vittoria, Niscemi and other smaller municipalities. The original leaders of the Stidda were Giuseppe Croce Benvenuto and Salvatore Calafato. A dynamite bomb later killed Stidda boss Calogero Lauria. They were involved a more direct war with the Mafia in the early 1990s. The vicious war led to over 300 deaths. One of these was the judge Rosario Livatino.

Stidda is not a tight organization and many gangs ("clans") operate relatively independently. They ally with each other or even the local chapter of Cosa Nostra. They have similar rituals and rules. There is also a membership tattoo. Older members use a needle and black and blue ink to carve a five-pointed star on the initiate's right hand between the thumb and index finger. This tattoo is known as stiddari.

== See also ==
- Sicilian Mafia
- Camorra
- Mala del Brenta
- Banda della Magliana
- 'Ndrangheta
- Sacra Corona Unita
- Società foggiana
