= Strisciuglio clan =

Italian organized crime group

- Founded: Late 1990s
- Founder: Domenico Strisciuglio
- Founding location: Bari, Apulia, Italy
- Years active: 1990s–present
- Territory: Many neighborhoods in Bari, in particular in the northern area of the city.
- Ethnicity: Apulians
- Activities: Murder, drug trafficking, money laundering, extortion, usury, gambling
- Rivals: Capriati clan Parisi-Palermiti clan Mercante-Diomede clan Misceo clan

The Strisciuglio clan is a criminal organization, originating from the city of Bari, having its stronghold mainly in the northern area of the city. The clan is considered the most powerful and bloodthirsty criminal organization operating in the Bari area.

== History ==
The criminal organization was born at the late 1990s as an offshoot of another clan operating in Bari, the Capriati clan. From the beginning, the Strisciuglio clan was commanded by Domenico Strisciuglio, nicknamed "Mimmo la luna" who is in jail from 1999 in the 41 bis regime. In August 2003, Franco Strisciuglio, Mimmo's brother, was killed in an ambush outside his home, at the age of 33. At that time, Franco was considered the number two in the criminal group, after Mimmo, and consequently the most important free member of the clan. In 2021, Vincenzo Strisciuglio, known as Chachino, another brother of Domenico, was sentenced to 7 years and 4 months in prison.

According to the investigators, due to the very restricted regime in which Domenico Strisciuglio finds himself, the reins of the clan would have passed to his brother Sigismondo, known as Gino, who despite having spent years behind bars, was subjected to a less restricted regime compared to the one of Domenico, which would have allowed him to continue managing the clan's affairs. Gino, in fact, after 22 years in prison was released in 2022; however, he was arrested again in April 2023 and released in January 2024.

According to the investigations, the clan has close ties with the politics of Bari, in particular with the former regional councilor Giacomo Olivieri, who for this reason was arrested in February 2024, accused of political-mafia vote exchange. According to the investigations, Olivieri had made an agreement with Giacomo Strisciuglio, son of "Franco La Luna", so that the clan could guarantee 300 votes for the election of Maria Carmen Lorusso, Olivieri's wife, a candidate for the centre-right in the 2019 municipal elections.

On August 31, 2024, Domenico Strisciuglio, known as Mimmetto, son of the boss Sigismondo, known as Gino “La Luna”, was arrested after the car in which he was traveling as a passenger did not stop at a police checkpoint, giving rise to a daring chase in the Carbonara district of Bari. Mimmetto and the driver of the car, who, according to the investigations, is also his bodyguard, allegedly tried to get rid of a Beretta pistol, which was seized for subsequent ballistic tests. Now both must answer for the crime of resisting a public official and illegal possession of a common firearm.

== The clan's activities ==
According to the investigators, the main action that characterizes the clan is its strong expansionist vocation, in particular in the creation of new "subgroups", where it can operate with its illicit trafficking and therefore increase the related revenues. Furthermore, the clan's activities are also characterized by an asphyxiating control of the territory which manifests itself through the extortion exercised against numerous small entrepreneurs and artisans. According to the Strisciuglios, they also focus on the activities of the gaming market through the installation of slot machines and video lotteries.

== Structure ==
Thanks to a long investigation coordinated by anti-mafia prosecutors, it was able to outline the continuous rise of the Strisciuglio clan, defined as the criminal association with the most advanced organization in the Bari area. A growth that has not stopped despite the many arrests of its members in recent years, affirming its hegemony with blood and unscrupulousness. The clan's tentacles have thus enveloped the San Paolo neighbourhood, where they have violently gripped the Misceo clan, followed by a violent expansion, almost like "ethnic cleansing", to also incorporate the Enziteto neighbourhood into their territories, becoming predominant in the Libertà and San Girolamo neighbourhoods, between ruthless killers and firefights, even threatening "untouchable" neighbourhoods such as Japigia, a fiefdom of the historical Parisi-Palermiti clan. Also extending its tentacles into other cities in the Metropolitan City of Bari, between Palo del Colle, Conversano and Rutigliano, marking the peak of the clan.

For investigators, the Strisciuglios represent an attractive 'brand' for the youngest, even minors, enchanted by the criminal power of the historical bosses, to whom they would have shown devotion and submission. A sort of "popular mafia", whose hierarchies are not fixed if compared to other criminal associations, and are scalable if brutal acts are committed by its members and affiliates. Yet, according to the investigations, the Strisciuglio system would rest on two legs: the street and the prison. The first would be the 'gym' with which its affiliates are able to gain experience through criminal and violent acts. In prison, however, there would be the clan's real control room, with which to orchestrate operations, through the use of numerous cell phones, and maintain control of the territory for a "strong permeability" between the outside and the inside.

== Subgroups ==
Due to its strong expansionist power, over the years the clan formed "subgroups" that became its representatives in various neighborhoods of the city of Bari, each led by its own leader, based on a territorial division.

- Caldarola faction - Libertà neighborhood
- Campanale faction - San Girolamo neighborhood
- Faccilongo faction - Enziteto and San Pio neighborhoods
- Ruta-Telegrafo faction - San Paolo neighborhood
- Milloni faction - Borgo Antico
- Valentino faction - Carbonara neighborhood

== See also ==
- Organized crime in Italy
- Società foggiana
- Capriati clan
