= Società foggiana =

Italian organized crime group

Società Foggiana
- Founded: 1989
- Founding location: Foggia, Italy
- Years active: 1989–present
- Territory: Gargano, San Severo, Lucera, Cerignola in Province of Foggia; Presence also in Molise, Abruzzo and in Piedmont.
- Ethnicity: Foggians
- Activities: Murder, cigarette smuggling, arms trafficking, drug trafficking, money laundering, extortion, prostitution, usury, gambling, ecomafia
- Allies: 'Ndrangheta; Camorra; Balkans criminal organizations: Albanian mafia, Serbian mafia

The Società Foggiana or simply Società , also known as Mafia Foggiana (Foggian Mafia) and the fifth mafia (in addition to Cosa Nostra in Sicily, the ’Ndrangheta in Calabria, the Camorra in Campania and the Sacra Corona Unita in greater Apulia, from which the Società Foggiana split), is a mafia-type Italian organized criminal organization and criminal society operating in a large part of the Province of Foggia, including the city of Foggia itself, and having significant infiltrations also in other Italian regions.

Currently, it is considered one of the most brutal and bloody of all the organized crime groups in Italy—there was about one murder a week, one robbery a day and an extortion attempt every 48 hours in Foggia province in 2017 and 2018. These were wrongly reported as the work of the Sacra Corona Unita, the fourth mafia, by news media unaware of the new independent mafia in Foggia province. "But that wasn't the case. We are witnessing what should be called a fifth mafia, independent of the Sacra Corona Unita", according to Giuseppe Volpe, a prosecutor and anti-mafia head of Bari.

In 2020 at least three mafia subgroups were operating in the region around Foggia: the Società Foggiana, the Cerignola clan, known for armoured car robberies and cocaine smuggling, and a group active around Gargano, where 80% of killings go unsolved and whose bosses are believed to have killed 360 people.

== History ==
In the late 1980s, the Società foggiana was founded, possibly as an internal division of the Sacra Corona Unita. According to Deputy Prosecutor Antonio Laronga, the Società foggiana was founded in 1979, after a meeting between Raffaele Cutolo, at the time leader of the Nuova Camorra Organizzata (NCO), and Apulian criminals at Hotel Florio, in the Province of Foggia. At the time Cutolo was waging a bloody war against the historic leaders of the Camorra, such as Michele Zaza, the Nuvoletta brothers, Antonio Bardellino, Carmine Alfieri and Luigi Giuliano. In the meeting, Cutolo and the Apulians reached an agreement, founding the branch of the NCO in Apulia, known as the Nuova Camorra Pugliese, that according to Laronga, was the true predecessor of the Società foggiana.

Despite the uncertainties of the organization's true foundation, the January 1989 murder of Giuseppe Laviano, lieutenant of the Sacra Corona Unita in Foggia, whose body was never found, marked a turning point in the mafia war and the rise of Rocco Moretti, known as il porco (the pig), in the context of the Foggia organized crime at the expense of Laviano himself. After the murder, Moretti became the head of the new criminal organization known as Società foggiana. Following the arrests made by the police in the Mantide operation, among the many details, macabre revelations emerged, such as the photo of Laviano's severed head, shown to the main members of the Società Foggiana during the summits.

The relations between the Foggia delinquency and the Camorra are probably the oldest and deepest ones. The Foggia delinquency has managed to make the qualitative leap thanks to the Camorra, particularly the Nuova Camorra Organizzata. During the NCO period, many "Cutoliani" spent periods of imprisonment in the prisons of San Severo and Foggia, making contacts with and recruiting local criminals. Raffaele Cutolo's sister, Rosetta Cutolo, lived in San Severo in an obliged stay. Cutolo organized a sort of offshoot of the NCO in northern Apulia, the Nuova Camorra Pugliese. The killing of Don Peppe Sciorio, Lieutenant of Cutolo for Foggia, was another clear sign that the Foggia criminals wanted to become independent.

In 2013, journalist Roberto Saviano said: "The Società foggiana is the most ignored mafia group by the media, but it’s very powerful and brutal."

According to the investigations, Società foggiana's members from San Severo, in the province of Foggia, are active in the drugs market with the support of eastern European criminals, in particular with the Albanian mafia.

=== Società foggiana's clans ===
The most powerful clans inside the Società Foggiana are:

- Trisciuoglio clan
- Sinesi-Francavilla clan
- Moretti-Pellegrino-Lanza clan

=== Top members ===
Among its most important members are:

- Rocco Moretti
- Federico Trisciuoglio
- Roberto Sinesi
- Emiliano Francavilla
- Vito Bruno Lanza
- Salvatore Prencipe
- Michele Mansueto

== Other gangs ==
In addition to the extortion and drug-dealing Società foggiana proper, other distinct gangs can be identified: the armoured car heisting and cocaine smuggling Cerignola clan, and another group active around the Gargano, on the spur on the back of Italy's "boot", which smuggles marijuana from the Balkans.

Other Cerignola, most famous provincial cities for the strong presence of the mafia (due to feuds and / or infiltrations in many economic sectors) are San Severo, Monte Sant'Angelo, Manfredonia, San Nicandro Garganico, Vieste, Lucera and Orta Nova.

== Police operations ==
In September 2019, the Italian police dismantled an international drug trafficking alliance between the powerful Gionta clan of the Camorra, the Società Foggiana, and Moroccan drug traffickers. The investigation started in 2016 against a Maghreb gang based in the region of Trentino-Alto Adige. The vast network of drug traffickers, extended from Morocco, passing through Spain, Switzerland and the Netherlands to finally arrive in Trentino and in Bolzano. Arriving in Italy, the drugs were sold in parks, historic centers and near schools by mainly Tunisian and Moroccan pushers. Nineteen people were arrested, with four still being wanted in Italy, Spain and in the Netherlands at the time, and seventy-three under investigation. Over one ton of hashish and 2 kg of cocaine were seized.

In January 2020 two bomb attempts were made in Foggia to murder a key witness in a major trial against mobsters; nobody was injured. The anti-mafia task force was reinforced after the attacks, and 20,000 people marched through Foggia in a protest organised by the anti-mafia group Libera.

== Activities in 2020 ==
In 2020, there was a wave of car bombs and arson attacks against non-payers of "protection". This has been interpreted as an indication that the new groups were in a cash crisis, and needed to frighten people into paying. There was evidence following the lockdown during the severe 2020 COVID-19 pandemic in Italy of the mafia, including the Puglia gangs, using their cash to purchase businesses that failed during the lockdown.

In late 2020, it was reported that the Foggia society was extorting €50 per coffin from funeral homes. About 40 alleged members, including the clan leaders Federico Trisciuoglio and Pasquale Moretti, were arrested in dawn raids by hundreds of police centred on Foggia. They were held on charges including suspicion of belonging to a mafia organisation, usury and extortion. They had bribed a local official who provided them with information on deaths in the city. They had been offering loans with annual interest rates in excess of 400%. The head prosecutor of Foggia said that the operation was important as it sent a message to those extorted to "give them the courage to rebel and collaborate with the authorities. Only like this can we finally get rid of a mafia that is impoverishing our territory".

== See also ==
- Strisciuglio clan
- Sicilian Mafia
- Banda della Magliana
- Mala del Brenta
- Stidda
