= Basilischi =

Organized crime group based in Basilicata, southern Italy

- Territory: Basilicata
- Activities: drug trafficking, extortion, racketeering
- Allies: Ndrangheta

The Basilischi (Italian: [baziˈliski]) was an organized crime group based in Basilicata, a region of southern Italy, officially formed in 1994 by Giovanni Luigi Cosentino in Potenza. According to the national anti-Mafia prosecutor's office, the areas with Basilischi strongholds were those of Policoro, Montalbano Jonico, Pisticci, Scanzano Jonico, and the Val d'Agri and Vulture regions.

On 22 April 1999, 84 orders for pre-trial custody were issued by the Potenza Prosecutor's Office. That started what became known as the maxi-trial, which jailed the main figures of the Basilischi and demonstrated their existence and strength in Basilicata. The maxi-trial concluded in 2007, with a 700-page summation by the judges and the sentencing of 26 people for Mafia-type association to a total of 242 years in prison. In a ruling dated 30 October 2012, the Court of Appeal of Potenza confirmed the existence of the Basilischi. The conviction of many high-profile members of the clan caused the group to become fractured and fall further under the influence of the more powerful Calabrian-based 'Ndrangheta.
