= Mazzanti =

Mazzanti is a family name of Italian origin. Like many similar family names (Mazza, Mazzacane, Mazzaferro, Mazzacurati, Mazzagalli, Mazzapica, Mazzamici etc.) the name is derived from the Italian word mazza, meaning mace, bat, staff, or hammer, whence the verb ammazzare ('to kill') is derived. Thus, it is an example of an occupational surname and was likely adopted by workers who used a staff or a hammer in their profession, such as a toolmaker or a soldier.

The name Mazzanti is found in all parts of Italy, with large concentrations in Emilia-Romagna (especially near Rimini) and Tuscany (near Florence and Lucca). The name was established in the United States during the massive waves of Italian immigration in the late 19th and early 20th centuries. It can be found in concentration in western Pennsylvania, Arkansas, and northern California.

== People with the Mazzanti surname ==
- Enrico Mazzanti
- Giancarlo Mazzanti is a prominent Colombian architect.
- Giuseppe Mazzanti, Italian baseball player
- Ludovico Mazzanti (Orvieto, 1686 – Viterbo, 1775)
- Luca Mazzanti: Mazzanti Automobili
