= Lo Presti 'ndrina =

- Founded by: Rocco Lo Presti
- Founding location: Bardonecchia in the province of Turin, Italy
- Years active: 1960s-present
- Territory: Piedmont, Bardonecchia, Susa Valley, Turin, Marina di Gioiosa Ionica
- Ethnicity: Calabrian
- Leaders: Luciano Ursino, Giuseppe Ursino
- Criminal activities: public contract, infiltration in public administration, wear, extortion, money laundering, gambling, restaurants
- Allies: Mazzaferro 'ndrina, Aquino 'ndrina

The Lo Presti 'ndrina of Bardonecchia is a clan of the 'Ndrangheta, a mafia-type organization in Calabria, Italy.

The Lo Presti 'ndrina is originally from Marina di Gioiosa Ionica in Calabria with its criminal base in Bardonecchia in Piedmont, North Italy. The Lo Presti are closely related to the Mazzaferro 'ndrina.

The infiltration of the Lo Presti family in the public administration led in 1995 the President of the Italian Republic to dissolve the municipal council of Bardonecchia, giving the alpine town the sad record of first and only municipality in Northern Italy dissolved for alleged mafia infiltrations.

According to a justice witness, in recent years, the relationship with the Mazzaferro cousins has cracked and Lo Presti has approached and allied with the Aquino family, rivals of the Mazzaferro clan. The family is currently governed by the nephews of Rocco Lo Presti, the brothers Luciano and Giuseppe Ursino.

== The rise of the Ursinos, the Lo Presti nephews ==
In 1993, nephew Giuseppe Ursino along with 15 other people were arrested in Bardonecchia for the trafficking of arms and drugs.

In April 2004, the Ursinos approached a politician to try to obtain European Union funding, and set up a million dollar usury ring. Among the victims of usury, was a political figure, who denounced the organization, and in November 2006 Rocco Lo Presti was arrested along with his Ursino nephews.

In February 2018, Giuseppe Ursino and Ercole Taverniti were arrested for extortion and criminal mafia association, and seized all commercial activities, bars and restaurants.
