= Rocco Lo Presti =

Italian crime boss

- Mugshot of the 'Ndrangheta boss of Bardonecchia Rocco Lo Presti
- Born: May 6, 1937; Marina di Gioiosa Ionica, Reggio Calabria, Italy
- Died: January 23, 2009 (aged 71); Turin, Piedmont, Italy
- Resting place: Cemetery of Bardonecchia
- Other name: Roccu u Maneja – Zzi Roccu
- Occupations: Crime boss, businessman
- Allegiance: 'Ndrangheta

Rocco Lo Presti (born Rocco Lopresti May 6, 1937 – January 23, 2009), known in Marina di Gioiosa Ionica, his town of origin as "Roccu u Maneja", was an Italian crime boss of the 'Ndrangheta, a Mafia-type organization in Calabria, Italy, but his criminal base was Bardonecchia, in Piedmont region.

== Biography ==
Lo Presti was born on May 6, 1937, in Marina di Gioiosa Ionica from a humble peasant family. The father Salvatore Lopresti and the mother Maria Caterina Femia make do as they can, working the land. The first of eight children, he leaves elementary school very early and joins his uncle, in close contact with the capobastone (head of command) of Gioiosa Ionica, Rocco Amleto Monteleone, known as " Roccu u Regginu ", managing the business of his uncle and Monteleone, in the market fruit first, and market fish after.

At the age of 16, he left Calabria and moved to Piedmont together with his cousins, the Mazzaferro brothers.

In 1957 he was arrested in Casale Monferrato for selling counterfeit money, together his cousin Cosimo Ierinò, known as " Cosimu u Caddara".

In 1963 he was sent to stay in soggiorno obbligato in Bardonecchia, and booming construction puts on a small construction company. In September of the same year, Mario Corino, unionist and future mayor of Bardonecchia was attacked and beaten at night by strangers. The police arrested for the attack, two calabrese workers. Francesco Ursino, brother-in-law of Lo Presti, and Antonio Zucco, originally from Ciminà. Questioned by the judge, the two declared to have beaten Corino, because he was an Italian Labor Union spy. Lo Presti had been the instigator.

In 1965 he was arrested in Geneva by the Swiss gendarmerie, with Alberto Re, an entrepreneur of Bardonecchia, for a series of thefts in the villas. They were arrested for the last shot they took. Theft of 60 million jewels inside a judge's villa. He was tried and sentenced to two years imprisonment.

In 1968, Lo Presti returned to Bardonecchia and married a compaesana in one of the most luxurious hotels in the city, the Grand Hotel Riky. Among the guests, the well-known American boss Frank Coppola (mobster) known as Frank Tree Fingers and the Gambinos of Cherry Hill, New Jersey.

In December 1969 he was suspected as the instigator of the Timpano murder. At Exilles, along the Val di Susa provincial road, the body of Vincenzo Timpano from Grotteria, Calabria was found. He was killed by his brother-in-law Giuseppe Oppedisano, who in turn is a brother-in-law of Rocco Lo Presti. The body was sprinkled with gasoline and set on fire. The Alfa Romeo 1750 owned by Lo Presti was found at the scene of the crime. Oppedisano confessed, but he never revealed the motive. Lo Presti instead had an unassailable alibi. He was flying on a plane to southern Italy.

In June 1970, just six months later, he was again suspected as the instigator of the D'Aguanno murder. The body of Luigi D'Aguanno was found in an abandoned landfill at Moncalieri, a professional fence just released from prison. Someone said he paid a tip to the police with his life. The police arrested for the murder, Carmine Messina on the car owned by Lo Presti. Also that time Lo Presti was flying on a plane bound for Calabria, but was acquitted of all charges.

=== From laborer to 'Ndrangheta front man in Bardonecchia ===
On May 1, 1971, on Workers' Day in a bar in Turin, a group of Calabrese immigrants engaged in a gunfight. One of whom was Carmelo Manti who left four dead on the ground. They were arms merchants who demanded payment of a bribe which Manti owed them almost 2 million lire. Among the dead was Giuseppe Prochilo. He was a boss of the building racket and the Lo Presti's right-hand man. This massacre lifted the veil and broke the silence in the building racket. Manti, revealed information on the racket. He revealed tenders and subcontracts, exploitation, bribes. He revealed the names of the bosses who controlled the racket. Among the names there was also that of Rocco Lo Presti. Turin discovered an organization sprouted on the misery and suffering of many immigrants. The attention of the newspapers and the judiciary concentrated on Bardonecchia. Through threats, intimidation and abuse of all kinds, he had managed to control the construction workforce in Val di Susa.

In January 1972 a group of armed Calabrese workers surrounded a construction site ordering the workers to be evacuated and never be seen again. The job thus passed to Lo Presti. However, when the magistrate began the interrogations, no one remembered anything. Leonardo Ferrero, reporter of l’Unità, who was doing a service on building speculation in Val di Susa was threatened by Lo Presti. The Labor Union was also threatened. The mayor of Bardonecchia, Mario Corino, reported Lo Presti to be a mobster.

In May 1972, Giovanni Rosace said, in Bardonecchia was an intense traffic of arms and precious items coming from Marseille controlled by Lo Presti. In the same period, a report by the carabinieri claimed that Lo Presti controlled five clandestine gambling dens in Turin.

In 1973, the court of Locri, sent his cousin Don Ciccio Francesco Mazzaferro to Bardonecchia in soggiorno obbligato. Together they dominated the field of gaining lucrative contracts such as the construction of the Fréjus Road Tunnel. They started with illegal hiring, abusive exploitation of workers and racket in yards. Through threats and intimidation they were able to control the labor building in Val di Susa.

=== First Antimafia Commission inspection in Northern Italy and later exile ===
In 1973 the Parliamentary Antimafia Commission, drawn by the numerous articles in the newspapers, for the first time in Northern Italy, conducted an inspection in Bardonecchia, confirming the presence of organized crime, identifying Lo Presti as the 'Ndrangheta boss of the city. The then police chief commissioner of Turin Emilio Santillo, wrote a voluminous report (dossier Santillo), about the 'Ndrangheta infiltration in Piedmont, that controlled the building industry with particular reference to the figure of Lo Presti. Due to the report in 1975, Lo Presti was accused to having all the workforce in the construction industry under his control, and at the request of the public prosecutor at the Court of Turin Bruno Caccia, the judge murdered by the 'Ndrangheta of Turin in 1983, Lo Presti was sentenced to three years in exile in the prison on the island of Asinara. On the island, he knew many mafia figures, Luciano Leggio, Tommaso Buscetta, Ignazio Pullarà from Palermo, Giuseppe Di Cristina from Riesi, Rocco Gioffrè from Seminara, Francesco Barbaro from Platì.

=== The kidnapping-murder Ceretto ===
In February 1976 Lo Presti was taken from the prison of the island of Asinara because he was accused of being the instigator of the Mario Ceretto kidnapping-murder, a wealthy industrialist of Cuorgnè found buried in a field in Orbassano. On May 23, 1975, Ceretto was kidnapped and found dead a week later in the abandoned field. Lo Presti was accused by Giovanni Caggegi to be creator of the kidnapping. In the kidnapped were also involved and arrested, Giuseppe Cosimo Ruga from Monasterace, Cosimo Metastasio from Stilo, Sebastiano Giampaolo, Giuseppe Calabrò, known as Il dottorino and Giuseppe Giorgi from San Luca, Raffaele La Scala from Locri and Venanzio Tripodo, son of Don Mico Domenico Tripodo. After the arrest of Lo Presti, the clans in Turin were reorganized. One by one the people close to Lo Presti were eliminated.

In February 1977 Carmine Carmelo Messina, who had been involved with Lo Presti in the D'Aguanno murder disappeared.

In July 1977, three hooded killers and armed with lupara killed Giuseppe Zucco, originally from Ciminà, in Calabria tied to Lo Presti. He was part of the organization that recruited the labour for the building industry and had been involved with Lo Presti in the traffic of arms and precious items coming from France with the Organizer crime in Marseille. The other two brothers of Zucco, Rocco and Antonio were also killed, also very close to Lo Presti. Murders to frame everyone in the so-called Faida di Ciminà in Calabria.

In July 1978, while the trial of the Ceretto murder was under way, Giuseppe Oppedisano, brother-in-law of Lo Presti, after nine years in jail for the Timpano murder, crowds of jealousy, went out of prison and killed his wife. The victim was Giuseppa Lo Presti, sister of Rocco Lo Presti. A real blow to Lo Presti and his reputation as a boss of the 'Ndrangheta. Those who knew him argue that, at that time, Lo Presti was so powerful that he would never have allowed such an affront to pass. Even Caggegi, who accused him of kidnapping Ceretto, when knew of Lo Presti's arrival in the Le Nuove prison in Turin, took refuge on the roofs of the penitentiary for three days for fear of reprisals.

In February 1979 Oppedisano committed suicide. He was found hanged in the toilets of the Ferrara mental asylum. Four months earlier Lo Presti was released from prison. For the Ceretto kidnapping, Lo Presti will be acquitted in the first instance, but will be sentenced on appeal to 26 years imprisonment. Lo Presti foreseeing the sentence, deserts the hearing and goes untraceable. His lawyers appeal to the Supreme Court. In the meantime he took refuge in France moving between Paris and Marseille and doing some good business with the organized crime in Marseille. He will go on a golden fugitive of two years and in December 1982 the big turning point arrives. The Supreme Court clamorously refers the documents to the Court of Appeal of Genoa due to irregularities and the judgment concludes with an acquittal for insufficient evidence, definitively excluding Lo Presti from any involvement in the Ceretto case. Years later it will be discovered that this decision by the Supreme Court was not entirely accidental. Rocco Lo Presti allegedly gave the archivist of the Vatican, Monsignor Don Simeone Duca, 30 million lire for his intercession with the magistrate of the Supreme Court It is said that Don Giovanni Stilo, the priest of Africo, gave him contact with Don Simeone Duca.

In 1987 he was arrested for a fraud of three billion lire to a bank of Cuneo, but that time he was acquitted of all charges.

In 1991, Lo Presti requested and obtained criminal rehabilitation.

In 1993, Lo Presti's nephew, Giuseppe Ursino, was arrested in Bardonecchia, along with fifteen other people for arms and drug trafficking. Representatives of the Cataldo 'ndrina from Locri and the Commisso 'ndrina from Siderno are also involved and arrested.

=== Bardonecchia first municipality in northern Italy dissolved for alleged mafia infiltration ===
In 1991 Pierluigi Leone, chief police commissioner of Bardonecchia was suddenly transferred to Calabria without reason, just two months after his arrival. Leone had touched strong political interests in Bardonecchia, was investigating the future realization of the Campo Smith complex and had written an investigative report on Lo Presti and proposed a measure of prevention against him. Lo Presti himself had threatened him and made him understand that he was aware of confidential inquiries about him.

In 1995 Lo Presti was re-arrested because of his involvement in the deal Campo Smith. The construction of a mega residence, located in Campo Smith, at the foot of the ski resorts. An investment of 50 billion lire was the biggest work ever made in Bardonecchia after the Fréjus Road Tunnel. According to the indictment Lo Presti was the head of the organization that handled the entire Campo Smith operation. Alessandro Gibello, the mayor of Bardonecchia was unjustly arrested (prosecuted, Alessandro Gibello was acquitted and compensated for damages), and all officials of the municipality were investigated for alleged constraints due to the organized crime. The carabinieri marshal of Bardonecchia was also investigated. All the biggest construction sites in the Bardonecchia were seized by the magistrate and was also involved and arrested Gaetano Belfiore, brother of the well-known boss of the 'Ndrangheta transplanted in Turin, Domenico Mimmo Belfiore.

On May 5, 1995, by decree of the Government is dissolved for alleged mafia, by the President of the Italian Republic, the Municipal Council of Bardonecchia, the first municipality in northern Italy dissolved for alleged mafia infiltration. The Court seized property and assets to Lo Presti worth 10 billion lire.

In April 2001, during the trial Campo Smith, a government witness, said in prison by a certain Musuraci detained in Spain, of a possible Lo Presti involvement, together with the Belfiore and Ursini crime families, in the murder of the Turin chief prosecutor, Bruno Caccia. However, there was not evidence of a direct role of Lo Presti in that murder and no charges stuck. Also the government witnesses, Giacomo Lauro and Francesco Fonti, declared to the judges of the Turin Court, of the existence in Bardonecchia, of a locale of 'Ndrangheta, headed by Rocco Lo Presti and Francesco Mazzaferro, which dated back to the 1970s. The government witness from Palermo, Vincenzo Lo Vecchio, claimed that Lo Presti and Francesco Mazzaferro, were involved together with other Calabrese, in a large traffic of cocaine from Colombia. But even in this case, the investigators never managed to obtain evidence against Lo Presti.

=== The rise of the nephews Ursinos ===
From 2000 onwards the criminal structures in Bardonecchia changed. Due to constant pressure from the judiciary and law enforcement agencies, Lo Presti was forced to cede the command scepter to his nephews, the brothers Luciano and Giuseppe Ursino. With this move, Lo Presti hoped to draw less attention to himself. Convinced then, from so many years of impunity, that in the event of judicial troubles, at most they could forbid him to leave Bardonecchia, the law that established the obligatory stay, in the place of residence. The nephew, Luciano Ursino, very soon entered into business relations with the brothers Adolfo and Aldo Cosimo Crea, from Stilo, Calabria, emerging bosses of the 'Ndrangheta of Turin, with a videopoker tour, trimming gaming machines to as many merchants as possible, from Bardonecchia to Turin.

In 2003, on the eve of the 2006 Winter Olympic Games in Turin, he began to talk about tenders in Val di Susa. The first threats arrived. The Works Director of the Turin-Bardonecchia highway (Autostrada A32), and the Turin Agency for 2006 Winter Olympics, received envelopes with bullets. The Ursinos managed to bribe a police inspector who informed them about the investigation and gave them a scanner to find bugs.

In April 2004, the Ursinos approached a politician to try to obtain European Union funding, and set up a millionaire wear ring, that extended from Bardonecchia to Turin. Among the victims strangled by usury, there was a well-known political figure, who denounced the organization, and in November 2006 Rocco Lo Presti was arrested along with his nephews Ursinos. The Court seized again assets to him worth 2 million euros. Lo Presti spent the last period of life moving from one hospital to another. Lo Presti died of a heart attack on January 23, 2009, in the department detainment of the Molinette Hospital in Turin at the age of 72, the day after he was sentenced to six years for criminal association with the mafia. Few attended his funeral for fear of police checks. Lo Presti was buried in the Bardonecchia cemetery.
