= Giuseppe Coluccio =

Italian criminal (born 1966)

- Mugshot of 'Ndrangheta boss Giuseppe Coluccio
- Born: April 12, 1966 (age 60); Marina di Gioiosa Ionica, Italy
- Relatives: Salvatore Coluccio (brother); Antonio Coluccio (brother)
- Allegiance: 'Ndrangheta

Giuseppe Coluccio (Italian: [dʒuˈzɛppe koˈluttʃo]; born 12 April 1966) is an Italian criminal and a member of the 'Ndrangheta, a Mafia-type organisation in Calabria. He was a fugitive and included in the list of most wanted fugitives in Italy from 2005 until his capture on 7 August 2008, in Toronto, Ontario, Canada.

== Born into a 'Ndrangheta family ==
Coluccio was born in Marina di Gioiosa Ionica, a seaside town on southern Italy's Ionian coast. He was the first of three sons born into a traditional 'Ndrangheta family. Before he reached his teens, his father Vincenzo, was murdered in Marina di Gioiosa Ionica during a bloody feud that ravaged competing 'Ndrangheta Mazzaferro clan, in contrast to the clan Aquino. The clan survived and eventually rose to prominence under the leadership of Giuseppe Coluccio. The clan achieved an "unbreakable" monopoly on the sale of fish through the "power of intimidation" that was so strong the fisherman declared it a "law" that they answered to the clan, according to Italian Antimafia prosecutor Nicola Gratteri in a dossier for Canadian authorities. Proceeds from the monopoly were invested in a "vast drug-trafficking operation in cocaine."

His first arrest for drug dealing and trafficking was in 1991. Since then, various investigations identified him as a key player in the import of cocaine from Colombia for a cartel of 'Ndrangheta clans in collaboration with Roberto Pannunzi, who brokered the deals in Latin America.

He was also involved in trafficking heroin from Turkey, smuggled in by fishing boats controlled by the Coluccio-Aquino 'Ndrina in Marina di Gioiosa Ionica. He is a cousin of Rocco Aquino and Giuseppe Aquino, the bosses of the Aquino 'ndrina in the town.

== Fugitive and arrest ==
He became a fugitive in 2005 when he fled for Canada due to charges on drug trafficking in relation to an operation by the Italian police arresting 30 people (Operation Nostromo), that also included his brother Salvatore Coluccio. Leading 'Ndrangheta bosses around Toronto were told to expect the Coluccios before they arrived. His youngest brother, Antonio Coluccio, who was not facing charges in Italy at the time, arrived first and settled with his Canadian wife (Melina, daughter of mob boss Carmelo Bruzzese) in Richmond Hill, Ontario—a member of the Siderno Group who later faced Mafia related charges in Italy in 2014 after leaving Canada in 2010, and was sentenced to 30 years in prison in 2018 for corruption.

Coluccio entered on the powerful Camera di controllo – the board of control for 'Ndrangheta clans, comprising six or seven Toronto-area men, who co-ordinate activities and resolves disputes among Calabrian gangsters in Southern Ontario. He also aligned himself with members of the Sicilian Mafia, in particular with Giuseppe Big Joe Cuntrera, a member of the Cuntrera-Caruana Mafia clan operating in Canada and Venezuela and involved in large scale cocaine trafficking. Police allege Coluccio continued trafficking "substantial quantities" of cocaine and hashish from South America while he was living in Canada.

Coluccio was arrested on 7 August 2008, outside a strip mall in Markham, Ontario, north of Toronto. He stayed at The Palace Pier, a luxury condominium overlooking Lake Ontario. He had been hiding in Canada for nearly three years under the false identity of "Giuseppe Scarfo", and was wanted for drug related offences, charges of Mafia association and extortion. He was extradited from Canada to Italy on 20 August 2008, and incarcerated under the strict Article 41-bis prison regime.

== Links with Mexican cartels ==
His arrest was part of a larger law enforcement operation in the US, Mexico and Italy – known as Operation Solare or Project Reckoning in the US – against the Mexican Gulf Cartel that controls the movement of significant amounts of Colombian cocaine to the United States and Europe. The operation resulted in some 200 arrests in September 2008. Among those detained were sixteen members of the Aquino-Coluccio clan. They were identified and arrested in New York and Calabria.
