= Cosimo Cordì =

Italian criminal (1951–1997)

- Born: 1951; Locri, Italy
- Died: October 13, 1997 (aged 45–46); Locri, Italy
- Cause of death: Murdered (shot)
- Occupation: Capobastone
- Organization: Cordì 'ndrina
- Known for: Head of the Cordì 'ndrina
- Allegiance: 'Ndrangheta
- Criminal charges: Murder (suspected)

Cosimo Cordì (Italian pronunciation: [ˈkɔːzimo korˈdi]; Locri, 1951 – Locri, October 13, 1997) was a member of the 'Ndrangheta, a criminal and mafia-type organisation in Calabria, Italy. He was the head of the Cordì 'ndrina based in Locri, a hotbed of 'Ndrangheta activity. The Cordì 'ndrina is involved in a long blood feud with the Cataldo 'ndrina, from the same town, since the end of the 1960s.

His brother Domenico Cordì, was killed in Locri on June 23, 1967, in the so-called Piazza Mercato massacre, which signed the beginning of a long blood feud with the Cataldo 'ndrina. The motive for the elimination of Domenico Cordì was the alleged fleecing of some 1,700 cases of cigarettes that were smuggled into Catanzaro by Sicilian mafiosi of the Tagliavia and Spadaro families in Palermo to Antonio Macrì, the undisputed head of the 'Ndrangheta in Siderno allied with the Cataldos.

Cosimo Cordì took over as the head (capobastone) of the clan with his other brother, Antonio Cordì – known as ‘U Ragiuneri. Antonio Cordí was also a municipal councilor for the Italian Socialist Party (Partito Socialista Italiano – PSI) and a powerful vote broker in national elections.

Cordì was arrested in March 1991, suspected of killing the brain surgeon Domenico Pandolfo who unsuccessfully operated Cordìs’s nine-year-old daughter Paola suffering from a complicated brain tumor. The girl died after three days and Pandolfo was killed in retaliation.

In the ongoing feud with the Cataldo 'ndrina, Cordì was killed on October 13, 1997, in Locri, while on a bicycle in the company of his nephew Salvatore Cordì. His pupil, Pietro Criaco is said to have moved through the spectating crowd to kiss his boss goodbye, whose head had been nearly blown away in the attack. The Locri football club mourned the death of the boss with one minute of silence at the start of a game. His brother Antonio Cordì, ‘U Ragiuneri, took over the leadership of the clan.
