= Torbido =

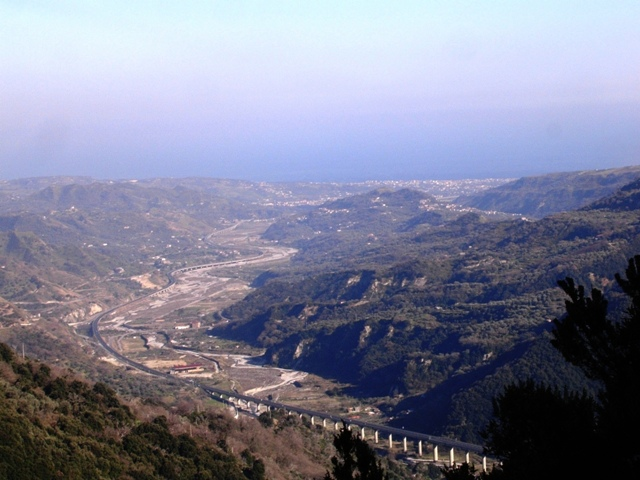
- The Torbido valley seen from mount San Nicodemo

Location
- Country: Italy
- Region: Calabria

Physical characteristics
- Source: Aspromonte National Park
  - coordinates: 38°21′59″N 16°11′10″E
  - elevation: 928 m (3,045 ft)
- Mouth: Ionian Sea
  - location: Marina di Gioiosa Ionica
  - coordinates: 38°17′38″N 16°19′31″E
  - elevation: 0 m (0 ft)
- Length: 18 km (11 mi)
- Basin size: 160.3 km^{2} (61.9 sq mi)

The Torbido is a river in the Calabria region of southern Italy. It might have been the river Sagra of classical antiquity. It rises in the mountains of the Aspromonte National Park and flows in a southeastern direction. It drains into the Ionian Sea at Marina di Gioiosa Ionica after a course of 18 kilometers. It has a drainage basin of 160.3 square kilometres (61.9 sq mi).
