= Martone =

Comune in Calabria, Italy

- Comune
- Comune di Martone
- Coat of arms

- Location within Italy Location within Calabria
- Coordinates: 38°21′N 16°17′E
- Country: Italy
- Region: Calabria
- Metropolitan city: Reggio Calabria (RC)
- Frazioni: Poligori

Area
  - Total: 8 km^{2} (3.1 sq mi)

Population (2001)
  - Total: 597
  - Density: 75/km^{2} (190/sq mi)
- Demonym: Martonesi (Martunisi)
- Time zone: UTC+1 (CET)
  - Summer (DST): UTC+2 (CEST)
- Postal code: 89040
- Dialing code: 0964
- Patron saint: Saint George (Santu San Giorgi)
- Saint day: 23 April
- Website: Official website

Martone (Calabrian: Màrtuni) is a comune in the former province of Reggio Calabria, in the Calabria region of southern Italy. The town was founded between the 7th and 8th centuries by Greek Christian monks from the Byzantine Empire, particularly from the regions around the Aegean Sea and the Levant.

Martone, like many communes in the Locride area, was part of a larger group of comuni, all founded by Greek monks.

Within the Grotto territory (which includes the municipalities of Mammola, Martone, and St. Giovanni di Gerace) are small monastic churches that still preserve traces of Byzantine art. In addition to preserving historical relics, these monasteries were instrumental in promoting agriculture and trades. They were involved in reforestation, land reclamation, and cultivation, which helped establish the first artisanal activities during the Byzantine period.

== Early History & Naming (9th-15th century) ==
The name Bucito appears in several 12th-century documents. It is recorded in a 1119 act signed by Nicola, son of Leone, a presbyter and protopope of Bucito, and again in a 1139 document referring to the church of the Theotokos. A later reference occurs in a 1181 deed of sale involving members of a family from the area of Bucita, which also mentions a notary from Buceto.

There is also a reference to an ancient village of Basilian origin named Santa Maria di Bùcita (also known as Vùcita or Bucìto). According to Ottaviano Pasqua (1574–1591), in his Life of Nicola II, Bishop of Gerace from 1219 to 1229, Nicola II claimed the rights of the Mensa vescovile over the Cerchietto property: "quod circum locos, quibus a S. Johannis oppido, et S. Maria di Bucita, Martonem hodie vacant, continetur" (Rossi, Sinodo, p. 258).

== Presence of monks ==
In the bios of San Nicodemo, Codex Messanensis XXX (drawn up in 1308), folio 247 r-v, it states: "There is, therefore, in the area of Bucito a temple dedicated to the Mother of God, very famous, and the site is very suitable for us." However, when the monks arrived, they found the local inhabitants celebrating the Feast of the Ascension of Saint Mary. Unable to find the tranquility they sought, the monks returned to Kellerano.

Another finding that could confirm the presence of Greek monks in the proximity of Martone is perhaps a small church dedicated to Saint Nicholas, where excavations have revealed a Byzantine necropolis. Furthermore, in the locality of Gujune, the remains of the Basilian monastery of S. Anania are still visible, which has a cell isolated from the rest of the grotto by a wall that most certainly was used as a dormitory for the monks.

Proof of the presence of Greek monks in Martone is the Signum Pacis, which is now in the church of Maria SS. Assunta. It consists of a metallic tablet with a handle depicting the resurrection of Christ and the Virgin Mary. The Signum Pacis was offered to newlywed couples to kiss at the end of the nuptial ceremony as part of an ancient Byzantine ritual.

Giovanni Fiore da Cropani (1622–1683) defined Martone as a very ancient town in his treaty on "Grotteria with two thousand inhabitants, with the jurisdiction of two very ancient villages, Martoni and S. Giovanni". In his contribution, Abbot Orazio Lupis thus writes: "Martone, one of the lands of the Area (of Grotteria) called in the past S. Maria di Bucita; the other is named S. Giovanni."

According to certain testimonies, the history of Martone was related to a 12-volume opus, which got lost in the transfer from the old to the new municipal building. Parlà and Cutrone must have written something about Martone, but their manuscripts have also been lost.

The origin of Martone is unclear, as with other adjacent centers. Martone must have also undergone notable development at the time of the Saracen invasions in Calabria. Fiore, on page 174 of his Calabria illustrates, calls it a "'very ancient village' together with S. Giovanni" (Enzo Dilena, 'Martone', in his "Storia e cultura della Locride" "History and culture of the Locride land", Messina, 1964, pp 519–520).

== Aragon domination period (1442–1503) ==
In the 1400s, Martone, although continuing to belong administratively to Grotteria and the diocese of Gerace, became a feudal domain of various families. The first known family is the Spanish Aragona de Ajerbis, under whose possession it remained from 1431 to 1450. At that time, Martone was one of the four "castles of the Baronage of Grotteria" together with S. Giovanni, Mammola, and Gioiosa.

From 1450 to 1458, the commune was ruled by Tommaso Caracciolo, who held the title of First Marquis. Caracciolo’s usurpation of authority at the expense of the Episcopal Curia led to royal intervention, which curtailed several abuses of power and local conflicts. The Marquis Caracciolo was accused of being an 'offender of the person of the King'. By order of King Alfonso V, Caracciolo was deposed and imprisoned in 1445. In 1447, he was condemned to death but was able to escape and find refuge in Rome.

On 1 January 1458, King Alfonso invested his Councillor Marino Correale as Master of Arms for the Baronage of Grotteria, "cum Terris and Casalibus infrascriptis Moctǽ Jojosǽ, Mammulǽ, Sancti Johannis a Giraci, Salvi, Sideroni, Oiccoloni, Martoni, et Baptipedoni…" (Quinternione V, folio 173) Martone was administered on behalf of the Royal House, first by Marino Correale and subsequently by his brother Raimondo, nobles of Sorrento, with the title of Governor.

Being part of the territory of Grotteria, it followed its feudal events, passing from a possession of the Correale family (1458–1501) to the Carafas (1501–1558) and, then, to the Loffresos (1558–1573), to the Ruffos (1573–1576), to Elias (1576–1577), to the Aragonas (1577–1631), and again to the Carafas until the abolition of feudalism.

In 1501, Martone passed together with Grotteria, of which it was part, to the Neapolitan family Carafa, a branch of the Caracciolos, and in 1503, obtained the Principality of Roccella.

An exponent of this family, namely Don Carlo Maria Carafa, gave some laws to his lands; one was prompted by "an iniquity" committed very often in Martone, where trees were being cut and burnt. For this crime, innocent persons were prosecuted. To prevent such an occurrence, Don Antonio ordered that, before being able to request compensation for the damages, it was necessary to bring a certain number of witnesses in front of the judge.

During this period, Martone underwent three severe earthquakes: one in 1659, another in 1663, in which the chapel of SS. Salvatore was destroyed, and one more in 1668, which destroyed the Church of San Nicola.

== The Habsburgs of Austria (1707–1738) ==
From 1707, after Spanish rule ended, the South of Italy came under the rule of the Habsburgs of Austria, who remained until 1738. During this period, internal fighting continued, causing unrest in the country.

In 1723, a territorial boundary was drawn between the municipalities of Martone and Gioiosa Jonica, and a slab of local granite was placed at the entrance of the town as a border marker. It has the date inscribed and the borders mapped, which no longer apply due to the continuous expansion of the residential area towards Gioiosa Jonica.

== Period under the Bourbons (1738–1806) ==
Following the 1738 Treaty of Vienna, the Bourbons ruled the Kingdom of Naples. Under their rule, there was a half-century of peace. This period was not altogether tranquil, however, because of both internal fighting and natural disasters.

In the administrative ordinance set up at the time of the Partenopean (Neapolitan) Republic in 1799, Martone was a municipality in the canton of Roccella. The Bourbons enacted the law on 1 May 1816, by which it was transferred into the domain of Giosa Jonica.

== 1783 earthquake ==
The Calabrian earthquakes of 1783 struck Martone and nearby villages on 5 February 1783. The earthquake, which lasted about 15 minutes, caused a significant amount of damage to Martone as well as destroying the majority of Calabrian villages resulting in around 30,000 casualties.

The residential centre located in the low zone (Basia) was destroyed and was relocated to higher ground on the hill, where it still exists today.

== French domination (1806–1815) ==
At the beginning of the French occupation, with an edict by Joseph Napoleone Bonaparte dated 2 August 1806, the feudal system was abolished, after which the territory was subdivided into 13 provinces, each one into districts and municipalities.

== Return and End of Bourbon rule (1815 - 1861) ==
In 1815, following the downfall of Joachim Murat, Bourbon rule was re-established. They maintained, in general lines, the stable administrative structure of the French, and Gerace was confirmed as the capital of the district. The profound civil and social transformation of the brief innovative French period had prepared an atmosphere not altogether ready to accept the Bourbons' absolutism, which was to follow the beginning of the 1847 insurrection and, in the District of Gerace, had a quick and unfortunate conclusion with the execution of the Five Martyrs in the Piana di Gerace, who had fought for liberty, as Vittorio Visalli writes in Lotta e Martirio del popolo Calabrese ('Fight and martyrdom of the Calabrese people'). Ruffo and Pier Domenico Mazzone, two of the Five Martyrs of Gerace, in their flight in order to avoid being caught, sought refuge in the territory of Martone, in one of Mazzone's properties, but soon departed as they realized that both the local and S. Giovanni's di Gerace's Civic Guards were searching for them.

The Bourbons' rule ended with the arrival of Garibaldi's troops, which were welcomed with jubilation in the whole of the South of the Peninsula. The pro-Bourbons were trembling with fear, displaying the tricolour cockade and Italian-style beards. Many citizens of Martone formed part of Giuseppe Garibaldi's army.

== Festivity in honor of Saint George ==
Every year, on 30 August, it is customary to celebrate in honor of Saint George, a feast of thanksgiving for having miraculously averted the danger of General Lamarmora's artillery. On the night of 1 July 1860, a group of men from Gioiosa, led by a Sicilian adventurer, attempted to abduct young girls from Martone. The people of Martone responded with an armed attack. But the Sicilian adventurer, having distinguished himself for valor and courage in the ranks of General Lamarmora's army, found the opportune moment to ask for the general's help and demanded the destruction of Martone. The Sicilians' demand was heard and was planned to be executed, but on the dawn of 30 August, the decree was revoked, and the town was spared. The inhabitants of Martone attributed their freedom to the divine intercession of Saint George. Today, 30 August, is regarded as the day of the miracle.

== Post-Bourbon (1861-) ==
Calabria was neglected because, after the annexation of the Kingdom of Sardinia, the few existing industries were all transferred to the north. Calabria was lacking in roads, aqueducts, and a sewer network, and taxes were very high. Martone was also hit by two more earthquakes that took place in 1905 and 1908, destroying the majority of the township, including the church of the Assumption, which was rebuilt on the same site in 1932. The same year, a revolt by the people against the government took place due to high taxation. During this insurrection, many casualties were recorded and a number of citizens were unjustly arrested and prosecuted.

== Geological and archaeological remains (1950-) ==
In the late 20th century, the territory of Martone revealed a number of geological and archaeological findings. In 1954, during excavation for roads connecting to Croce Ferrata, an ancient necropolis was brought to light in the area called La Vigna. It has not yet been sufficiently studied, but it featured a titulus with an uncertain style of writing and interpretation. At the same site, several skeletons were also found, one of about 1.9 metres (6.2 ft) in height, lying at random in tombs that were rudimentarily covered with large terracotta tiles, very much like the ones uncovered at the excavations in Locri.

In the suburban area of San Nicola on 5 and 6 April 1973, during road construction, a necropolis emerged that can be dated to around the year 1000. Three items on small tablets of soft stone and redingote were discovered: three Greek-Byzantine epigraphs, which have become part of the corpus of Byzantine inscriptions from South Italy and Sicily. The three inscriptions have not yet been interpreted, although it is agreed that their significance is entirely of a religious nature (considering the signs and the site where they were found).

== Church of S. Anania or Grotto of the Saracens ==
The church of S. Anania is situated in the locality of Gullune or Gujune, a short distance from the bed of the Livadio stream, in the hollow of a huge rock of stalactite origin, also called "Grotto of the Saracens", where the remains of the Basilian monastic oratorio of St Anania can be observed, mentioned in the act of Leonzio, bishop of Gerace.

In certain circumstances, the grotto of S. Anania is called "Grotto of the Saracens" in consideration that the Basilian monastic complex was plundered by Saracen raids on the Ionic foreshores of Calabria between the 7th and 10th centuries.

The most severe destruction by the Saracens in the Locride area took place between 952 when under the walls of Gerace, a bloody battle was fought between the Byzantine troops commanded by Milacron, and the Saracen ones led by Abu-l-Kasem, who renounced its occupation, and 986, the year in which Gerace – after being conquered and destroyed in 982 – was again captured and put to the sac.

Between these two dates, the monasteries of S.Maria di Bucita and the nearby monastery of S. Anania were also destroyed.

N. Spatari, in his treatise L'enigma delle arti asittite nella Calabria ultramediterranea writes, "Chiesa-Grotta sul fiume Livadio, that laps Martone, a town on the rising slopes above the Chiesa-Grotto, was used as a refuge by the first local Christians escaping the Roman centuries. Later on, around 600–700, at the entrance of the grotto, an external structure was added to better accommodate the faithful; in it, we can see some frescos which express, with a variety of colours, the technique and the style of the Church-Rocca of Göreme, particularly in the figures followed by symbolic decorations in red. One of my detailed reconstructing surveys allows us to realize its originating architectonic structure, whose stereo-metric elements are typical of the architecture developed in Anatolia-Cappadocia and in the Christian Orient of Mesopotamia, Syria, Iraq, Sudan, and along the Nile."

On the inside of the large grotto, the monks had found other spaces and a small cell that was likely used as a dormitory.

Nearby is the Pietra di S. Anania, a gigantic mass of calcareous rock with an irregular form.

== Mazzone's Tower ==
Martone, together with the neighbouring S. Giovanni di Gerace, was likely part of a highly defensive system of watchtowers. In the suburb of Solleria (Sujeria), the remains of a tower, which may be dated to the 16th century, are still intact. During the kingdom of the Bourbons, an optic telegraph was installed, intended for conventional signals to be sent across long distances.

The construction is a quadrangular tower dominating the beneath extending Vallata del Torbido, of which remain the ruins of the basement containing four buttresses. On the ground floor, on the left side of the access door, the evidence of the barrel-vault ceiling that must have covered the inside rooms can still be seen.

The tower was made of stone, consisting of one square-shaped room, in which were billeted the guard corps and the horses. On the higher level, it was divided horizontally by wooden scaffolding interconnected by wooden ladders.

In the past, the Valle del Torbido had a system of defensive watchtowers. The first was erected in the vicinity of the train station of Gioiosa Ionica (Torre Vecchia, 'Old Tower'); the other, closer, was Torre Galea or Cavalleria. Torre Elisabetta, instead, appears to have risen on the road leading to Gioiosa Ionica in the suburb of the same name, whilst, higher on the rock, the castle, which formed part of the defensive system, dominates imposingly.

From the tower, it was possible to communicate with the one in S. Giovanni di Gerace, situated in the locality of Torre or Licone, and with the Grotteria castle, which closed the system of watching and transmissions.

Two of the five martyrs of Gerace, Pietro Mazzone of Roccella Jonica and Gaetano Ruffo of Bovalino, during the revolutionary upsurge of 1847, found refuge in a property of Mazzone to avoid Spanish troops. There was a bounty placed on them of 1,000 ducats each for whoever captured them alive and 300 ducats for whoever found them dead. Several days later, however, the Civic Guard of General Nunziante captured them. They were later executed on 2 October 1847 in the Plane of Gerace, together with the other leaders of the revolt: Michele Bello of Siderno, Domenico Salvadori of Caraffa del Bianco, and Rocco Verducci of Bianco.

== The Episcopate (Bishop's Palace) ==
The bishop's palace, built in a vast olive plantation, is situated to the north of the shire at 200 metres (660 ft) above sea level in a position dominating the valley of the Levadio stream with views of the residences in Martone and S. Giovanni di Gerace. It was owned by the baron Macri and subsequently the Lucà family. It seems that during the summer periods, the palace gave hospitality to the bishops of the Locri–Gerace dioceses, who preferred the more temperate climate of Martone to that of the seaside enclaves. In the past, it must have belonged to the domain of Cerchietto as well as the region of Licone or Torre or Cavalleria di S. Giovanni di Gerace, then was the property of the episcopal curia.

Even now, around the palace, the remains of a large garden with a circular pool and palm trees can be noted. It is not known when the edifice was built, but it is said to date back to the 18th century, conjectured from the style of the principal façade and architectural elements that characterize it, such as doors, windows, and balconies.

The palace consists of three buildings built in different periods; the construction plan is in the form of an "L" in two stories. The ground floor of the southeast zone embodied a colonnade that was used as a summer lounge and had another room annexed. The central zone was employed as a depository, whilst the northeast zone was used as premises for the pressing of olives with a mill powered by animals. On the first level were the bed chambers. The walls were made of stone and mortar and plastered with sand and lime; in some portions, they show the use of bricks and of carusi (cylindrical elements of clay). The attic is made of wooden beams (chestnut and oak) on which is laid a flooring of the same woods. The palace today is in a state of neglect; therefore, a project has been approved for its restoration, the construction of other structures and the utilization of the surrounding area.

When work is completed, the complex should be used to house a Museo della civiltà contadina ('Rural society museum') with the aim of maintaining local traditions which have disappeared in some areas.

== Country residential structure: Villa of the Baron ==
In the Pilligori locality, one can still visit what used to be the villa belonging to the baron Ilario Asciutti of High Caulonia. He resided with his family there in the summer, whilst in the winter months, he would only visit occasionally to supervise the work of his dependents engaged in land cultivation. The villa had two stories, and the access was a stone-paved driveway about 100 metres (330 ft) long, flanked by evergreen trees and bushes interspersed by grey columns, with an oil lantern hanging from each tree. The lanterns were lit at sunset and extinguished a few hours later.

In front of the edifice was a large clearing with three stone benches and seesaws.

On the side of the building were two columns, one of which is still in place. On the northeast side of the villa is a large area with a pergola providing shade on hot sunny days. A set of semicircular stairs led inside.

On the ground floor was a large room where the horses were kept during the night, with adjacent stables. On the ground floor was a cellar with storage for oil, which was kept in four large terracotta jars. In fear that one of the jars could crack and the oil be lost, they cemented another very large vat underneath the flooring, still in place today, which is connected to the four above by means of a small drainage channel. Other rooms were used for wood storage and the breeding of domestic animals.

On the floor above (piano nobile) were the bedrooms, the kitchen and dining room, and the living room in which the baron would receive his peasants and friends and hold parties.

On these occasions, a modern horn-gramophone would entertain his guests. The walls and ceiling were decorated with frescos depicting romantic scenes. A wooden staircase (ncsasciata) connected this floor with the attic, where there was an oven and where seasonal fruit was preserved.

The house did not have a water supply, and the laundry, washed with water and ashes, had to be rinsed in the nearby Livadio stream because the baroness, for hygienic reasons, did not wish to make use of the public laundries.

== Church matrix and the cult of the Madonna of the Assumption ==
Traces of the cult of Saint Mary of the Assumption have been recorded in numerous documents since the 12th century.

The veneration of the Madonna is of Greek origin and was perhaps introduced to Italy by monks who took refuge at the time of the iconoclastic wars. The first church dedicated to her was situated in the lower part of the town in the suburb of Fontana Vecchia, not far from the Basìa or Batìa, a low area, and the water spring, from which water was drawn for all necessities until the water from Crini eventually reached all the houses. Crini in Greek means 'spring, source'.

The first nucleus of Màrtone's residential centre must have developed around that church and the monastic Basilian community originally called Bùcita, Bucito or S. Maria di Bùcita ('of the Buceti', meaning the inhabitants of Vùcita). The dedicated name was "of the Assumption", so it must be identified with the church matrix.

The ancient writings speak of the edifice as a monastery, but it appears to be confirmed that it was only a church with an annexe. On the other hand, the Canon A. Oppedisano, (Chrono history, page 372) writes: "Monastery of S Maria di Bucita was situated on the high part of the town (Martone). Today, some remains can be seen". And E. D'Agostino in his Bullettino Badia Greca Grottaferrata writes: "Monastery of S.Maria di Bucita, near Martone. Founded in Byzantine times. On 19 October 1106 it was entrusted to the Tempio della Deipara e sempre Vergine Maria". There is also a mention of the monastery by Salvatore Gemelli: "Monastero di S. Maria di Bucita. Described as very old in the 1106 by the Bishop Leonzio from Gerace, near Martone". Furthermore, Mons. Vincenzo Nadile has dedicated an erudite and precise monograph to the topic (S Matia di Bucita. Chiaravalle Centrale: Frama Sud. 1973.)

It was a high priest church in the Greek proto-papal rite, suppressed on 29 March 1480 by the Bishop of Gerace, Anastasio Chalchèolulos.

In a papal bull of 26 December 1525 (Russo, Regesto n. 16553), the spelling S. Johannis de Castro Martone appears. It reads: "Casertam et Terracinem, episcopis ac Vicario generali Episcopi Hieracen. Bernardino Brazano, cleric Napoletano. Familiari suo, providetur de una in S. Johannis de Castro Martone, et alia in S. Johannis de Pidoga {?} et reliquia in S. De Cofrano {?} ecclesiis Hieracem Archiep.i Tarentin..., "Dat. Rome, apud Sanctum Petrum, an. MCXXV, VII, Kl. Ianuary, an.III" "Grata familiaritatis obsequia".

In the beginning, it was self-managed, then governed until 19 March 1540 by Antonio Sirleto with the qualification of the parish priest (Russo, Regesto n. 18210). Also, D. Nicola Augurace, in a bull from 30 August 1583, is called rector of the parish church of the area of Martone, followed by D. Angelo Theotino in October 1608. At his death, January 1619, the church passed on to Francesco Mercurio (Russo, o.c., n. 28135). On 23 February 1730, the reverend medical doctor Francesco Catanaci, a local, was authorised to erect and endow the chapel to the church dedicated to S. Maria del Monte Carmelo, S. Francesco di Paulo, and S.Caterina of Alessandra V.M., though retaining the patronage of the Casata Catanaci family. The first in charge was D. Giuseppe Panetta, parish priest from 1699, who died in 1737, and who was succeeded by priest D. Antonio Panetta from Grotteria on 28 February 1737.

After the earthquake of 5 February 1783, the residential center started to move towards the high area, where the new parochial church dedicated to the Assumption was erected through the donations of the parishioners; later on, it was damaged by the 1905 and 1908 earthquakes. In 1923, it was restored and opened to the cult through the interest taken by the head priest, Oliva. It consists of three naves divided by pylons. The central nave culminates with the semi-circular apse painted with large figures of the Trinity by painter Corrado Armocida. The main altar, in precious marble, features polychrome decorations. Behind the altar, a tall column of pink marble sustains the precious tabernacle of chiseled silver in which the sacrament is held. The church is enriched with holy statues derived from the now-destroyed churches of Carmine and San Nicola and from the little church of S. Giuseppe.

Of interest are the "Madonna del Carmine" (with saints), two paintings from the 600s from the church of the Carmine, and San Giuseppe, a wooden statue sculptured in full size from a southern workshop of the XVII century.

A 7th-century canvas painted in oil depicting Saint Mary of the Assumption, the work of a southern painter, completes the apse.

In the central nave, the pulpit protrudes in baroque style, supported by a shelf in the form of a shell. The ceiling is decorated with caissons with stuccos and frames in white and gold, the same as the choir loft located above the main entrance. The ceiling is finished with two lateral paintings depicting Saint George the Martyr and the Annunciation. The paintings and the restoration are the works of the painter Carrado Armocida.

Among the treasures of the church must be listed a large silver pyx originating from a 17th-century Dominican convent and a silver chalice from the 5th century worked in filigree.

== Church of St. George ==
The Church of Saint George the Martyr has been situated in the lower part of the town since 1500. It appears it was assigned to Canon Simone Gentile. The same year, it was entrusted to don Giovannello Pittari, rector of the parish church of S. Giovanni of Gerace, who died on 9 September 1582. On 30 August the following year, the church of Saint George, seat of the confraternity (accommodated in the ’Chapel of the Purgatory souls’), then abolished, was entrusted to don Nicola Augurace, rector of the parish church of the circumscription of Martone.

In 1783, the church was destroyed by an earthquake, but three years later it was rebuilt.

Today the access to the church is via two doors, a main door and a secondary door. The main door is in wood with sculptured panels. The central ones depict on the left Saint George mounted on a horse and on the right a heraldic coat-of-arms. The entrance door is flanked by Ionic pillars surmounted by a tympanum.

Above the edifice rises the bell tower with its pointed arched windows. The inside consists of three naves divided by pylons. The main altar is of inlaid polychrome marble. Behind the altar is a monumental pavilion to the patron saint, the work of Raffaele Pata, in which is kept the wooden statuary group of Saint George with the queen and the dragon. In the lateral naves are two altars: the right altar is dedicated to Saint Anthony of Padua and the left to Saint James, the ancient protector of the town. The change happened before 1683, according to the writings of P. Giovanni Fiore da Cropani, who in Della Calabria Illustrata, speaks of solemn festivities held in Martoni, a village of Grotteria.
