= Operation Solare =

2008 anti-drug operation

- Part of Project Reckoning and the War on drugs
- Operation name: Operation Solare
- Part of: Project Reckoning and the War on drugs

Participants
- Planned by: U.S. Drug Enforcement Administration
- Executed by: United States, Italy

Mission
- Target: Gulf Cartel and 'Ndrangheta mafia

Timeline
- Date executed: 2008

Results
- Arrests: 200

Operation Solare (also known as Project Reckoning) is the Italian name for a 2008 anti-drug operation involving the United States, Mexico, Guatemala and Italy, involving a major Mexican drug cartel, the Gulf Cartel, and the 'Ndrangheta mafia from the Calabria region of Italy. In the operation, some 200 people were arrested in Italy and in the US.

== Background ==
According to the US Drug Enforcement Administration, more than 16,000 kg (35,280 lb) of cocaine, 450 kg of methamphetamine, 9 kg of heroin, 23,300 kg of marijuana, 176 vehicles and 167 weapons were seized as well as approximately US$60.1m (£33m). Charges pending in the United States and Italy cover various crimes, including trafficking of cocaine and marijuana, kidnap charges, attempted murder, conspiracy to use a firearm in a violent crime and conspiracy to kill and kidnap in a foreign country.

=== Indicted ===
Among those indicted are three alleged leaders of the Gulf Cartel: Antonio Cárdenas Guillén, Jorge Eduardo Costilla and Heriberto Lazcano, the leader of Los Zetas. Among those detained from the 'Ndrangheta, are sixteen members of the Aquino-Coluccio clan – led by Giuseppe Coluccio – which dominates the Gioiosa Ionica area in the province of Reggio Calabria. They were identified and arrested in New York and Calabria.

=== Aftermath ===
According to Nicola Gratteri, the Italian prosecutor, the Gulf Cartel is still present in Italy and Europe, despite the operation. "The traffic (between Mexicans and Italians) continues, because the Mexicans sold drugs for an even lower price (than the Colombians) and are content with lower profit margins, so it is considered convenient to buy from the Mexicans," he said.
