= Mazzaferro =

Mazzaferro is an Italian surname literally translating to 'iron-killer'. Notable people with the surname include:

- Mazzaferro 'ndrina, Italian criminal clan
  - Francesco Mazzaferro (born 1940), Italian criminal
- Peter Mazzaferro (1930–2025), American football coach
- Salvatore Mazzaferro (born 2001), Canadian soccer player
