= Francesco Mazzaferro =

Francesco Mazzaferro (born March 29, 1940), also known as Ciccio, was an Italian criminal and a member of the 'Ndrangheta in Calabria, in southern Italy. He belongs to the Mazzaferro 'ndrina from Marina di Gioiosa Ionica. The clan is opposed to the Aquino-Scali-Ursino clan from the same town. He was leading the Mazzaferro 'ndrina together with his brothers Giuseppe and Vincenzo. Together with his cousin Rocco Lo Presti, Mazzaferro also controlled Bardonecchia and Val di Susa in Piedmont.

== Moving north ==
In the early 1970s, Mazzaferro was found guilty of exercising a monopoly over transportation in the area of Gioiosa Ionica. The court ordered him to reside outside his region of origin, and in 1972 he moved to Bardonecchia in the Province of Turin, in the Piedmont region, where he lived for some time with his cousin Rocco Lo Presti. There, he started a transport and construction company, to serve the construction sites, and together with Lo Presti, within two years, he managed to clear the competition, in the construction sector, winning lucrative tenders as the realization of the Fréjus Road Tunnel.

Throughout the 1980s, he was charged with a variety of offenses in Piedmont, Calabria, and Sicily. On May 17, 1984, he was arrested for drug trafficking. He was sentenced to 18 years by the court in Turin in 1987, and the same court imposed for his release a deposit of 200 million and the obligation to stay in his home town Gioiosa Ionica, and a ban to return or stay in Piedmont, Valle d' Aosta and Sicily. He was found guilty of being the boss of a "mafia group" based in Piedmont that was involved in several crimes, including drug trafficking and illegal money lending.

In 1995, Mazzaferro was involved in the investigations that led to the dissolution of the municipal council of Bardonecchia. Lo Presti was arrested because he was held responsible for having exercised his influence on the decisions of the public administration. Dissolving a municipal council was more common in the south of Italy, where the power of organized crime was firmly established. In the north of Italy, however, this had never happened before. The dissolution of the municipal council of Bardonecchia marked the recognition of the fact that 'Ndrangheta clans had penetrated deeply in society in Northern Italy as well.

== Prominent boss ==
In the 1970s, the Mazzaferro clan allied with the De Stefano 'ndrina from Reggio Calabria in the First 'Ndrangheta war. Vincenzo, Giuseppe and Francesco Mazzaferro were part of the hit squad, which also included Nicola and Giuseppe Cataldo, that killed the traditional 'Ndrangheta boss Antonio Macrì and wounded Francesco Commisso, Macrì's right-hand man.

In September 1991, Francesco Mazzaferro became a member of Camera di Controllo, a provincial commission of the 'Ndrangheta formed at the end of the Second 'Ndrangheta war to avoid further internal conflicts. The war had raged in Calabria for six years from 1985 to 1991 and left more than 600 people dead.

== Drug trafficking ==
In 1993, Mazzaferro was again arrested for drug trafficking. The Mazzaferro 'ndrina was also involved in cocaine trafficking from Colombia with the Sicilian Cuntrera-Caruana Mafia clan. In March 1994, the Italian police seized 5497 kilogrammes of cocaine (a European record at the time) in Borgaro Torinese near Turin (the investigation was code-named Operation Cartagine). The Mazzaferros also represented other 'Ndrangheta clans in the trafficking: Barbaro (Platì), Ierinò (Gioiosa Ionica), Morabito (Africo), Cataldo (Locri) and Pesce (Rosarno).
