= Viola Park =

Viola Park may refer to:

- Franz Horr Stadium in Vienna, Austria, home ground of FK Austria Wien
- Viola Park (Florence) in Bagno a Ripoli, Florence, Italy, commissioned by Rocco B. Commisso, home of ACF Fiorentina
