= Pietro Criaco =

Mugshot of 'Ndrangheta killer Pietro Criaco

Pietro Criaco (Italian pronunciation: [ˈpjɛːtro ˈkriːako]; born 9 December 1972 in Africo Nuovo) is an Italian criminal and a member of the 'Ndrangheta, the Calabrian mafia. He was a fugitive since 1997 and included in the list of most wanted fugitives in Italy until his capture on 28 December 2008 in Africo, near the southern city of Reggio Calabria.

He tried to enter the 'Ndrangheta when his father Domenico Criaco was killed in 1993. After he was refused by Giuseppe Morabito, he turned to Cosimo Cordì, who did accept him in the Cordì 'ndrina. When Cosimo Cordì was killed in October 1997 in the ongoing feud with the Cataldo 'ndrina, Criaco is said to have moved through the spectating crowd to kiss his boss goodbye, whose head been nearly blown away in the attack.

He led the counterattack against the Cataldos with Cosimo's son, Salvatore Cordì. According to informants Criaco was a hit man who was known to wash his hands in the blood of his victims.

In 2000 he was sentenced to 19 years together with the leadership of the Cordì 'ndrina and the Cataldo 'ndrina for murder, extortion and membership of a mafia organization. He was considered to be the military boss of the Cordì clan.
