= Mediacom =

American cable TV company

Mediacom Communications Corporation

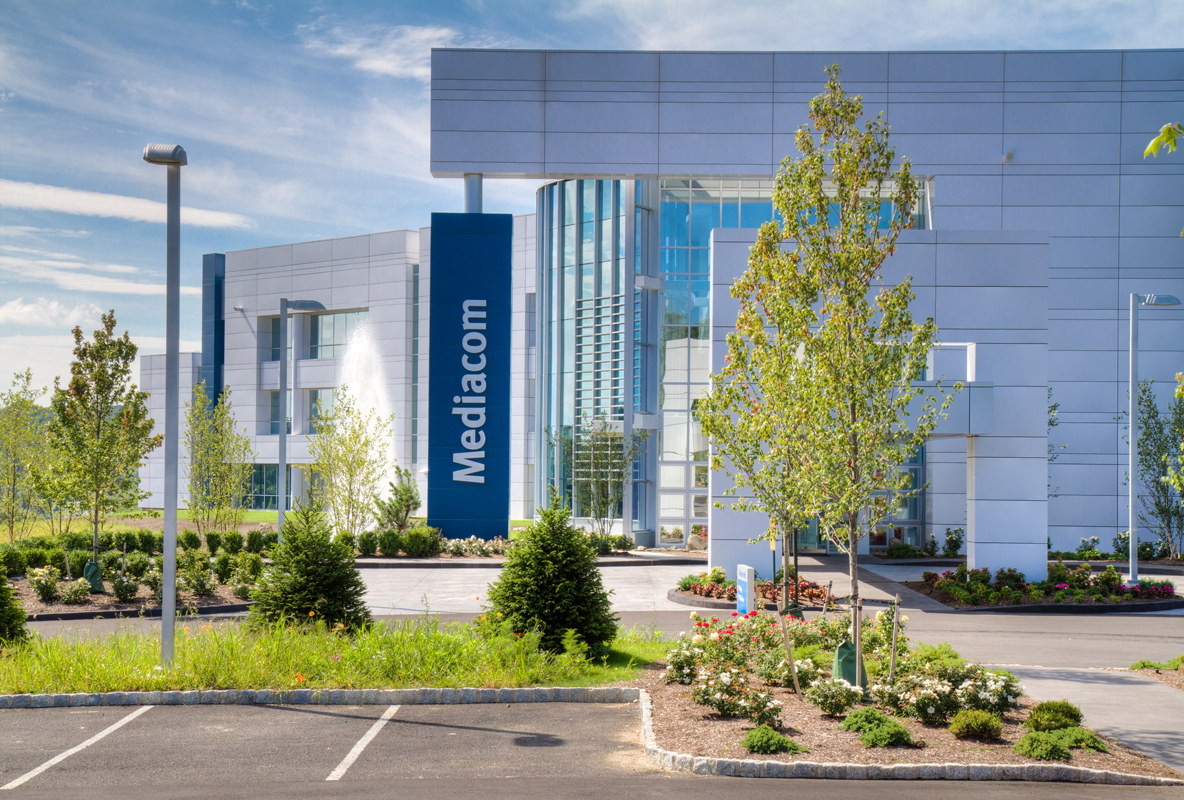
- Headquarters in Blooming Grove, New York
- Type: Private
- Traded as: NYSE: MCCC
- ISIN: US58446K1051
- Industry: Telecommunications
- Founded: July 1995; 31 years ago
- Founder: Rocco B. Commisso
- Headquarters: Blooming Grove, New York
- Area served: Primarily Midwest, Southeastern United States
- Key people: Giuseppe B. Commisso (Chairman And CEO)
- Products: Cable television, broadband Internet access, cable telephony
- Revenue: ▲$2,031.2 million (2019)
- Operating income: ▲$808.0 million (2019)
- Owner: Giuseppe B. Commisso
- Number of employees: 4,500 (2009)
- Subsidiaries: Mediacom LLC; Mediacom Broadband LLC^{:26} Mediacom Business; On Media
- Website: www.mediacomcable.com

Mediacom Communications Corporation is the United States' fifth-largest cable television provider based on the number of video subscribers, and among the leading cable operators focused on serving smaller cities and towns. The company has a significant concentration of customers in the Midwest and Southeast, and is the largest broadband provider in Iowa. Founded in 1995 by Rocco B. Commisso, Mediacom is headquartered in New York and incorporated in Delaware, United States. Formerly a publicly traded firm, it went private in a $600 million transaction in March 2011.

== Coverage ==
Mediacom offers service in 22 states (per Mediacom employee as posted on workplace wall). About 55% of Mediacom's subscription base is in the 60th- through 100th-ranked television markets. It is the largest cable company in Iowa and second largest in Illinois.

Examples of cities with Mediacom service include Albany, Columbus, Tifton and Valdosta in Georgia; Iowa City, Cedar Rapids and Des Moines in Iowa; Columbia, Jefferson City and Springfield in Missouri and the Quad Cities on the Iowa/Illinois border, and Baldwin City, Osage City, Lyndon, Douglas County, Osage County, and parts of Shawnee County in Kansas. Mediacom also serves outlying areas on the Florida Gulf Coast and around Minneapolis, Minnesota.^{:7}

In February 2017, Multichannel News reported that Mediacom was the ninth-largest multichannel video programming distributor in the U.S. with 828,000 video customers. Of 2.8 million "homes passed" (places where Mediacom service can be ordered), 44% have subscribed to basic cable with Mediacom, and 27.8% have subscribed to Mediacom Internet service. Of homes with basic cable, 54.8% also have "digital cable" service.

Within the company's self-published 2019 financial report, Mediacom described itself as the "5th-largest cable operator in the U.S. serving almost 1.4 million customers".

== Financial data ==
Counting basic cable, digital cable, high-speed data, and cable telephony as separate revenue, Mediacom had 2.981 million revenue-generating units (RGUs) at the end of 2009.^{:6} Fifty-two percent of customers had at least two of video, Internet, and phone from Mediacom, and 18% had all three; over the previous five years, video decreased from 80% of Mediacom's revenue to 64%.^{:7}

According to a report published February 20, 2020, Mediacom's revenues were $2.0312 billion for the year ended December 31, 2019. This reflects a 3.8% increase from the prior year period. Additionally, OIBDA or "operating income before depreciation and amortization" for the same period was $806.4 million, which had a 8.5% increase from the previous year period. Free cash flow during the same period also saw an increase by 31.1%. This positive cash flow was $418.9 million.

== Sports ==
Mediacom broadcasts local sports programming on its Connections channel, MC22, along with a simulcast of ESPNews. Other sports channels on the Mediacom lineup as of September 2015 include NFL Network, Big Ten Network, SEC Network and the national feed of the YES Network. Mediacom does not carry NHL Network, MLB Network or NBA TV.

== Reputation ==
Mediacom Communications was acknowledged by CableFax for having the best COVID-19 response in the cable industry.

Mediacom's Molli was named the 2019 winner in the category of artificial intelligence (AI) and machine learning at Cablefax's Technology Awards . Mediacom is believed to be the first telecommunication company to create an AI-based system fully integrated with customer service functions. Customers interact with the virtual assistant via SMS text.

TMT Magazine awarded Mediacom Communications the 2018 Telecoms Award for Best Cable Operator & ISP in the United States.

In 2016, Mediacom Communications was named the Nations Top Communications Provider by the leading industry publication CableFax.

In a 2016 telecom report conducted by ACSI, Mediacom occupied last place in customer satisfaction among all companies in the ACSI, regardless of industry.

In a survey conducted by Consumer Reports magazine in 2012, Mediacom is the worst cable provider in the country according to the 50,000 people polled.

The September 28, 2012 edition of PC Magazine named Mediacom one of the nation's worst 15 fastest internet service providers.

The Des Moines Business Record in its 2012 Best of Des Moines issue gave Mediacom the top award for Best Local Internet Service Provider and Best Company Use of Social Media.

As reported in the Chicago Tribune, July 19, 2012, Mediacom was named by the FCC as one of the nation's top 4 Internet service providers when it comes to delivering advertised speeds to consumers.

The February 2010 issue of Consumer Reports ranked Mediacom 15th of 16 in TV service, 24th of 27 in Internet service, and last of 23 in phone service, based on surveys. The deepening of this trend was affirmed in the June 2012 issue of Consumer Reports, in which Mediacom was poorly ranked regarding TV service, phone service and bundled telecom services, and the third worst ISP only above the two satellite internet companies Wild Blue and HughesNet.

== Availability for low-income customers ==
Mediacom makes low-cost plans available by participating in the Connect2Compete program via the nonprofit group EveryoneOn. This program offers cost assistance for wired home Internet access to Mediacom footprint residents who have school-aged children in the K–12 range. The purpose of this program is to provide online access to children for educational purposes and to help close the digital divide, a key issue receiving attention from the FCC in 2019.

== Carriage disputes ==
=== June 2015 carriage dispute with Granite Broadcasting ===
On June 1, 2015, Mediacom subscribers in three television markets served by Granite Broadcasting Corporation stations were unable to view those stations over Mediacom cable due to a carriage dispute between Mediacom and Granite Broadcasting over retransmission consent fees. The affected Granite Broadcasting stations included WEEK-TV in Peoria, Illinois, KBJR-TV in Superior, Wisconsin/Duluth, Minnesota, and WISE-TV in Fort Wayne, Indiana, all three of which are primary NBC affiliates. On June 11, 2015, Mediacom and Granite Broadcasting reached an agreement, thereby restoring Granite stations to Mediacom cable systems. The agreement came just in time for Game 5 of the 2015 Stanley Cup Finals which was broadcast on NBC two days later.

=== July 2015 carriage dispute with Media General ===
On July 14, 2015, Media General pulled its stations off of Mediacom cable systems across the United States due to a carriage dispute over retransmission consent fees. This carriage dispute saw Media General stations disappear from Mediacom lineups in 14 television markets across the United States and even three of the Fox affiliates owned by Media General were lost to Mediacom subscribers in Hampton Roads, Virginia, Terre Haute, Indiana, and Topeka, Kansas just before the start of the 2015 Major League Baseball All-Star Game. On July 30, 2015, Mediacom and Media General reached a new agreement, thereby restoring Media General owned stations to Mediacom subscribers in the affected areas.

=== Corporate views on carriage disputes and retransmission blackouts ===
On July 7, 2015, Mediacom filed a petition with the Federal Communications Commission to limit or prevent blackouts of local broadcast stations during carriage disputes. According to Mediacom CEO Rocco Commisso, the FCC has frequently neglected to address concerns regarding retransmission consent and blackouts of local television stations, particularly in rural areas, where residents have a more difficult time receiving an acceptable over-the-air signal. Commisso's proposal was for local broadcasters not to terminate a cable or satellite provider's carriage of the station's signal at the end of a retransmission consent agreement if the station does not reach a minimum of 90 percent of its local viewers within its DMA either over-the-air or via its online stream. Commisso also made note of the fact that retransmission consent fees double every two or three years – something which never happens in any other industry.
