= Cordì 'ndrina =

Clan of the 'Ndrangheta in Italy

- Founded: 1950s
- Founding location: Locri, Calabria, Italy
- Years active: 1950s-present
- Territory: Province of Reggio Calabria
- Ethnicity: Calabrians
- Criminal activities: Racketeering, murder, drug trafficking, loan-sharking, bootlegging, extortion, prostitution, fraud, corruption, gambling, money laundering and labor unions
- Allies: Commisso 'ndrina, Aquino 'ndrina, Ursino 'ndrina
- Rivals: Cataldo 'ndrina, Mazzaferro 'ndrina, Costa 'ndrina, Ierinò 'ndrina

The Cordì 'ndrina is a clan of the 'Ndrangheta, a criminal and mafia-type organisation in Calabria, Italy. The 'ndrina is based in Locri, a hotbed of 'Ndrangheta activity.

== Feud with Cataldo clan ==
The historical boss of the clan, Domenico Cordì, was killed in Locri on June 23, 1967, in the so-called Piazza Mercato massacre, which signed the beginning of a long blood feud with the Cataldo 'ndrina. The motive for the elimination of Domenico Cordì was the alleged fleecing of some 1,700 cases of cigarettes that were smuggled into Catanzaro by Sicilian mafiosi of the Tagliavia and Spadaro families in Palermo to Antonio Macrì, the undisputed head of the 'Ndrangheta in Siderno. Two years after the killing, the Cordì clan hit back, killing Giuseppe and Domenico Marafioti, respectively the brother and son of Bruno Marafioti, boss of the clan and allied with the Cataldo. A series of hostilities continued until 1975 after the murder of Antonio Macrì, when the adversaries, weakened by losses on both sides, agreed to a truce.

The truce fell apart due a bomb attack on July 4, 1993, against the boss of the Cataldo clan, Giuseppe Cataldo. He was the target of a bomb thrown at the car driven by his wife. The car was completely destroyed but Cataldo and his wife miraculously survived. Hostilities resumed.

Another boss of the Cordì clan, Cosimo Cordì, was killed in Locri on October 13, 1997. The Locri football club mourned the death of the boss with one minute of silence at the start of a game. His brother Antonio Cordì – known as ‘U Ragiuneri – took over as the head (capobastone) of the clan. Antonio Cordí was also a municipal council for the Italian Socialist Party (Partito Socialista Italiano – PSI) and a powerful vote broker in national elections.

== Recent developments ==
Salvatore Cordì, the son of the old boss Domenico, was killed on May 31, 2005, in Siderno. The police accidentally witnessed the killing when one of the killers inadvertently set off his mobile phone – which was under surveillance – while he descended the motorcycle used in the attack. On December 18, 2008, police arrested Antonio Cataldo for ordering the killing, jointly with three of the material killers. The killing of Salvatore Cordì was a retribution for the killing of Giuseppe Cataldo, a nephew of Giuseppe Cataldo the boss of the Cataldo clan, three months earlier.

In March 2006, police arrested several members of the Cordì family, including the suspected current boss, Vincenzo Cordì, and Salvatore Ritorto, believed to have pulled the trigger in the killing of Francesco Fortugno, the Vice President of the Regional Assembly of Calabria, in October 2005.

The military boss of the Cordì clan, Pietro Criaco was captured on December 28, 2008.

In 2010, police investigations based on intercepted conversations and government witnesses revealed that the Cordì and Cataldo clans signed a peace after a bitter feud that lasted for 40 years causing dozens of deaths. They formed a strong alliance aimed at a joint management of the crime business in the area, in particular in obtaining public work contracts and the extortion industry.
