= Grotteria =

- Comune
- Comune di Grotteria
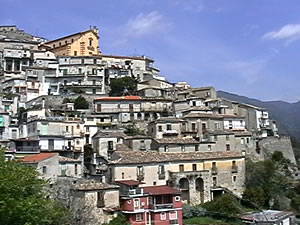

- Coat of arms

- Location within Italy Location within Calabria
- Coordinates: 38°22′N 16°16′E
- Country: Italy
- Region: Calabria
- Metropolitan city: Reggio Calabria (RC)
- Frazioni: Grotteria Mare

Government
  - Mayor: Vincenzo Attilio Loiero

Area
  - Total: 37.9 km^{2} (14.6 sq mi)
- Elevation: 300 m (980 ft)

Population (December 2007)
  - Total: 3,381
  - Density: 89.2/km^{2} (231/sq mi)
- Demonym: Grotteresi
- Time zone: UTC+1 (CET)
  - Summer (DST): UTC+2 (CEST)
- Postal code: 89043
- Dialing code: 0964
- Patron saint: Holy Crucifix
- Saint day: Second Sunday in September

Grotteria is a comune (municipality) in the Province of Reggio Calabria in the Italian region Calabria, located about 70 kilometres (43 mi) southwest of Catanzaro and about 60 kilometres (37 mi) northeast of Reggio Calabria.

The local economy, once based on agriculture and shepherdry, has slowed due to emigration, which shrank the population from 9,242 in 1951 to about 3,380.

Grotteria borders the following municipalities: Fabrizia, Galatro, Gioiosa Ionica, Mammola, Marina di Gioiosa Ionica, Martone, San Giovanni di Gerace, Siderno.

== Physical Geography ==
Grotteria is a town in the Torbido Valley in Locride, located on the Ionian side. It is one of the areas of the Ionian coast, the 30th municipality by area in the province of Reggio Calabria.

== Geological Characteristics ==
The territory of Grotteria develops on a complex of white-yellowish evaporitic limestone, sometimes sandy, with thin layers of silts and silty clays. This geological substrate exhibits moderate erosion resistance and medium permeability.

In the surrounding areas, there are deposits of coarse sands, varying in color from light brown to whitish, characterized by good compaction and sandy intercalations. These deposits show moderate erosion resistance and high permeability, influencing the hydrogeological characteristics of the territory.

== Origin of the Name ==
Founded in an area inhabited since the 8th century BCE, according to archaeological findings in the surrounding areas, it is identified by some with the ancient Castrum Minervae. The toponym, which appears in 12th-century documents written in Greek as Agriotèra, Agriotèras, and Agriotèrou, was attested in the 14th century as Grutteriae, Agrettarie, and Gruttarie. It may be a compound of the Greek words àgrios ('wild') and tèra ('land'), or a derivative of the Greek krupterìa ('hidden place, hiding spot'). However, there are those who attribute the name of the town to the Latin CRYPTA AUREA, 'golden cave,' referring to the gold mines located nearby.

== History ==
The origins of Grotteria are uncertain. It seems to have been founded, before the 11th century BCE, by the Greek Idomeneus, who built a temple there dedicated to the goddess Minerva. For this reason, the town was called Eruma Atenaies (Castle of Minerva). Later, it was occupied by the Locrians, who renamed it Athenaeon, perhaps due to the presence of buildings where sciences and arts were taught.

When the Roman Emperor Augustus occupied many areas of Calabria (including Grotteria), the town’s name was again changed to Crypta-Aurea (Golden Cave). Nearby, there were mines that extracted minerals, including gold and silver. In the 10th century CE, the Saracens invaded the Calabrian coast, forcing populations to move inland.

The people of Grotteria also abandoned their homes, relocating to the top of a hill in an attempt to defend themselves from sea attacks. At the same time, Calabria came under Byzantine rule, and Grotteria was heavily influenced by Constantinople. Customs, religious rites, and names adapted to the traditions of the invaders. Even the name of the river Zarapotamo, which flows near the town, comes from Greek and means “dry river.”

A few years later, however, the Normans settled in the region, and Grotteria was included in the county of Roger of Altavilla, which governed the territories between Squillace and Reggio Calabria. At the beginning of the 12th century, the town became an independent lordship, gaining significant importance. However, this period of prosperity was short-lived due to two severe earthquakes in 1160 and 1184, which caused widespread damage and loss of life.

With the arrival of the Swabians in the 13th century, the town flourished again. Around 1458, Grotteria became the head of an important county, with 32 settlements under its jurisdiction, including Martone, Mammola, Siderno, Gioiosa Jonica, and San Giovanni. It reached its peak of prosperity in 1507 when its jurisdiction expanded to its maximum extent. During this time, the use of the vernacular language spread, and the town was referred to as Grottarea, then Grottaria, and eventually Grotteria.

After the earthquake of 1783 caused significant damage, there was an attempt to relocate the historic town center, but it was instead decided to rebuild it. Between the 13th and 18th centuries, several noble families held Grotteria, including the Piscicelli, Caracciolo, De Luna, and D’Aragona de Ayerbe families. The Carafa family held it for a long time, in two distinct periods, until 1806.

In 1806, Joseph Bonaparte, brother of Napoleon, was proclaimed King of Naples. Following the new administrative reorganization, Grotteria became a circondano (district) with jurisdiction over Mammola, Gioiosa Jonica, Martone, and San Giovanni. However, once again, the town was devastated. On November 13, 1855, a violent storm destroyed homes and flooded the countryside, reducing many families to poverty.

== Monuments and Points of Interest ==
=== Religious Architecture ===
The religious devotion of the people of Grotteria is evidenced by the fact that, throughout its history, Grotteria once possessed 23 places of worship. Today, only a few remain: the Church of Saint George the Martyr (commonly known as San Domenico); the Church of Saint Nicholas; the Sanctuary of the Most Holy Crucifix; the Cattolica dei Greci parish of Santa Maria Assunta (Matrice); the Chapel of the Conception; the little Church of Saint Anthony; and a recently constructed church. Many others no longer exist, such as the Church of Our Lady of Mount Carmel, the Church of Saint George, the Church of Valverde, the Church of the Holy Help, the Church of the Trinity, the Chapel of Saint Onuphrius, the Church of the Holy Annunciation, the church known as the Oratory, and the small chapel of Bofia, also known as Our Lady of the Staircase.

==== Church of Saint George the Martyr (Also known as San Domenico) ====
It was built in the 11th century and destroyed by the earthquake of 1793. Rebuilt, it was again damaged by the earthquake of March 7, 1928, and was renovated two years later. The facade features a stone portal with floral decorations, flanked by four fake Corinthian columns (two on each side). The interior has a single nave. The altar made of polychrome marble is topped by a statue of Our Lady of Pompeii, alongside Saints Catherine of Siena and Dominic. In the church, a marble baptismal font with a wooden cover and an ancient statue of Saint Philomena, donated to the parish by the Tavernese family, are also preserved.

==== Saint Anthony ====
It was founded in 1640 by the lawyer Antonio De Maggio. Later, it became the private chapel of the Macedonio family. The facade features an entrance topped by a lunette tympanum with a coat of arms, above which is a window. Inside, there is a stone altarpiece with a statue of Saint Anthony of Padua. The chapel also houses the statue of Saint Vincent Ferrer (18th century).

==== Sanctuary of the Most Holy Crucifix ====
It was built, larger and in a modern style, on the site of a pre-existing small church dating back to the 16th century. The small building suffered extensive damage from the 1783 earthquake and was completely destroyed by the 1908 earthquake. The facade features a masonry portal with two side niches. Inside, with a single nave, the Most Holy Crucifix (likely a 17th-century work by a Capuchin friar) is venerated, to which the people of Grotteria attribute a miracle. In February 1745, a terrible storm struck the area, causing damage and casualties. The faithful then carried the Crucifix in procession, and suddenly the rain ceased. From that moment, the Most Holy Crucifix became the patron of Grotteria, replacing Saint Gaudioso. Additionally, the sanctuary houses the statues of Our Lady of Sorrows, Our Lady of Valverde, a wooden statue of the Sacred Heart of Jesus, and a richly adorned wooden casket containing the figure of the dead Christ, adorned with all the symbolic elements of the Passion.

==== Cattolica dei Greci Parish of Santa Maria Assunta (Matrice) ====
One of the most important and imposing churches in the Diocese of Locri-Gerace, immediately after the minor basilica of Gerace. It was probably erected at the end of the 10th century under the name of Maria Santissima Assunta della Cattolica dei Greci. Destroyed by the earthquake of 1783, it was rebuilt and reopened for worship on November 12, 1926. The facade features a masonry portal topped by a broken tympanum and a rectangular window (also with a tympanum). Above, a blind rose window. On either side of the entrance, accessed via a staircase, there are two windows. A bell tower with a clock rises above the church. The interior has three naves. On the polychrome marble altar, there is a painting depicting the Crucifix. The walls and the apse dome are fully frescoed, and several large paintings of notable quality are displayed: “Crucifixion among Saints” (a 17th-century work in the style of Ribeira), “Saint Francis with the Assumption” (a 17th-century work by Fabrizio Santafede, part of Andrea da Salerno's school), originating from the Capuchin convent that once stood in the area now occupied by the Church of the Crucifix, “Madonna of Graces with Angels and Saints and a Young Nobleman” (an oil painting by the Neapolitan School, inscribed "Janaurius Sernelli A.D. 1720"). Along the naves, there are two altars with statues of the Immaculate Virgin and Saint Joseph. The church also houses the statues of Our Lady of the Rosary, Madonna of Graces, Saint Lucy, Saint John the Apostle, Saint Anthony, the Risen Christ (originally from the old church next to the current Tocco Square Theater), Saint Francis of Paola with relics, and Saint Anthony Abbot (the latter a work by local painter and sculptor Giuseppe Cavaleri).

==== San Nicola de' Francò ====
The Church of Saint Nicholas of Bari is called "de' Francò" after the surname of a faithful woman who initiated the construction of the building in the 15th century. The facade features a stone portal topped by a window. Above, a masonry structure with bells can be found. Inside, with a single nave, there is a polychrome marble altar on which a painting depicting the Madonna with the Child, alongside Saints Nicholas and Dominic, is placed. The church also houses a statue of Saint Nicholas.

==== Chapel of the Conception ====
The chapel, located within the catacombs of the main church (matrice), was established between the 13th and 14th centuries. Part of the original structure remains, including a section of the pavement and the skeleton of some stairs that connected it to the matriz. Restoration work on the catacombs and the expansion of the chapel was halted due to the risk of collapse. Inside, there is an ancient marble statue depicting Our Lady of the Conception with the Child (4th century A.D.).

==== Saint Nicholas de Protonotaris in Contrada Pirgo ====
Built in 1963 to better serve the various fractions beyond the Torbido river, after the transfer of the parish from the Church of Saint Stephen the Pope (in the homonymous district) to Pirgo. After this church, another was built nearby, which today serves as the parish’s current home.

==== Sanctuary of Our Lady of Graces in Contrada Farri ====
The sanctuary was built, probably around the 1400s, depending on the Monastery of Santa Barbara in Mammola and later on the Matrice of Grotteria. It was rebuilt multiple times due to flooding from the Torbido river. On July 27, 1997, Our Lady of Graces of Farri was proclaimed Queen and protector of the Torbido Valley, and the feast is celebrated on the last Sunday of July.

==== Saint Stephen the Pope and Martyr ====
The original structure dates back to the 11th century, with expansions carried out between the 18th and 19th centuries, and since the 17th century, it has depended on the Matrice of Grotteria. The church was founded by monks from Serra San Bruno, and from 1912 to 1963, it served as the parish church of Saint Nicholas de Protonotaris. Saint Stephen the Pope and Martyr is celebrated on August 2nd.

=== Civile Architecture ===
Walking through the streets of the town, one can admire various portals that adorn the facades of the main Palaces, serving as testimony to the town’s history and distinctive marks of prestige for local noble families. Generally, the blocks that make up the portals are made of granite, with the noble coat of arms placed in the keystone, often accompanied by the construction year engraved beneath. Their history is extensively covered in the "Chronicle of Grotteria."

==== Palazzo Macedonio ====
Adjacent to the Chapel of San Domenico, the old family chapel of the owners, the building, home to the Dukes of Macedonio, features a finely crafted stone portal. The interior is notable, with stone arches and columns. Here, in a large niche, the stable for the traditional living Nativity scene held in Grotteria is typically set up.

==== Palazzo Palermo ====
It stands in the historic Piazza di San Domenico, now named after the patriot Nicola Palermo from the founding family, the Palermo barons of Santa Margherita.

==== Palazzo Arena ====
Founded in the 16th century by the noble family de Arena (now extinct), it stands on Via Vittorio Emanuele III. Despite its current state of severe deterioration, it still features the most beautiful of the monumental portals of the town’s noble palaces, constructed in 1773.

==== Palazzo Lupis-de Luna d'Aragona ====
Founded by the ancient noble family de Luna d'Aragona in the 16th century, and through marital alliances passed to the Manso family, and in the 17th century to the Lupis-Macedonio family, it is located in the historic Piazza del Tocco. Among the notable artistic elements is the monumental portal, a 17th-century work by the sculptural school of Serra San Bruno, and the library, which houses over 7,000 volumes and various art collections, busts, and portraits, including those of the local sculptor Giuseppe Cavaleri.

==== Villa Falletti ====
A majestic construction built by the Falletti family in the 17th century, located in the Bombaconi area. With two levels, it retains a beautiful stone portal.

=== Military Architecture ===
==== Castle ====
The castle of Grotteria, located on the ridge of Santa Margherita at approximately 420 meters above sea level, was likely built by the Normans between the 11th and 12th centuries on the remains of an earlier structure, perhaps Byzantine, used as a “Phourion” for controlling the isthmus route. Despite its original function as a fortress, with loopholes for surveillance and defense, the castle underwent several transformations over the centuries, evolving from a fortified residence to a prison, before eventually falling into complete abandonment.

Between the 15th and 16th centuries, the castle reached its peak period of splendor, but frequent earthquakes and necessary restorations gradually eroded its integrity. The last major destructive event occurred in 1783, when a devastating earthquake struck southern Calabria, severely compromising the structure. By the 19th century, the castle had already become a ruin and was definitively abandoned, leaving only perimeter walls, tower remnants, a cistern, and traces of a granite portal, which was partially destroyed in 1985.

The castle extends over a large area and features typical enclosure architecture, with corner towers: a circular one to the north and a semicircular one further south, while the central circular keep dominated access to the fortification. The structure, once fortified with a drawbridge, also contained a cistern for water collection. The main entrance, protected by a bastion, was originally guarded by merlons, which have since been bricked up. Its strategic position allowed it to monitor the entire valley, serving as a lookout point and defensive stronghold against invasions, especially from the north.

Throughout the centuries, the castle changed hands among various noble families: from the Caracciolo in the 14th century, to the Correale in the 15th, the Carafa in the 16th, and finally, the Aragona in the 17th century. During this period, the castle was also used as a prison, further marking its decline. After the 1783 earthquake, the castle lost its defensive role and became a ruin.

=== Archaeological Sites ===
==== Archaic Necropolis ====
This is the most significant burial complex discovered to date (11th–6th century BCE), where numerous funerary goods have been found, including graffito and incised ceramics of local production.

==== Greek Necropolises ====
A Classical period burial complex consisting of "cappuccina" tombs, following the "inhumation" ritual. The second complex comprises "cappuccina" tombs with funerary goods, including painted ceramics. The third complex consists of wall constructions, with only sparse remains of foundations remaining.

==== Roman Necropolis ====
Consisting of "cappuccina" tombs, near which the existence of a Latin "villa rustica" is presumed.

Archaeological remains have been found in the localities of Santo Stefano, Bombaconi, Pirgo, Zinnì, Farri, Agliola, Ricciardo, Marcinà, Seggio, and Cambruso.

==== Portanova of Agropteria ====
A hill in the locality of San Paolo houses the remains of a structure that, in the medieval period, likely served as a control station for transit between the Ionian and Tyrrhenian coasts.

== Society ==
=== Demographic evolution ===
Historical population

Year	Pop.	±%
1861	4,987	—
1871	5,277	+5.8%
1881	5,611	+6.3%
1901	6,385	+13.8%
1911	6,997	+9.6%

Year	Pop.	±%
1921	7,196	+2.8%
1931	7,840	+8.9%
1936	8,321	+6.1%
1951	9,242	+11.1%
1961	7,891	−14.6%

Year	Pop.	±%
1971	5,946	−24.6%
1981	5,020	−15.6%
1991	4,096	−18.4%
2001	3,611	−11.8%

Source: Data from ISTAT

== Festivals and Traditions ==
=== Holy Week (Triduum Paschale) ===
During the Holy Week, Grotteria actively participates in the passion of Christ by observing fasting, nighttime vigils, and following the holy cross on which Jesus gave His life for us, while also reflecting on the sorrows of His mother, culminating in the joy of Easter Sunday.

==== Holy Thursday ====
At the end of the Mass of the Lord’s Supper, all the churches in the town are left open in darkness, adorned with candles and plants made from legumes. The churches remain open throughout the night for the adoration of the Blessed Sacrament until the celebration of Good Friday.

Silence begins.

==== Good Friday ====
In the early afternoon, the "Passion of the Lord" is celebrated.

At its conclusion, silence resumes.

In the late evening, the Way of the Cross takes place through the town, with the glass coffin of the Dead Christ carried in "vow" by the women, the sorrowful Mother, and the large cross of death carried on the shoulder of those seeking grace. Lanterns and crosses of light are carried by the local youth. Along the route, there are 14 stops, each located at or near a church, leading to the mother church, continuing the following morning.

Silence continues.

==== Holy Saturday ====
Early in the morning, from the mother church, the "Via Matris" (Way of the Mother) begins, where the seven sorrows of the Virgin Mary are contemplated, reaching the town’s Calvary. The parish priest gives a sermon, and after it, everyone returns to the sanctuary.

Silence resumes until the celebration of Christ’s resurrection at midnight.

==== Easter Sunday ====
In the afternoon, following the Mass, a poignant representation of the Passion of Christ is held, during which the statues of the Sorrowful Mother, Saint John, and the Risen Christ are carried on the shoulders. Saint John runs to the Virgin Mary to announce that her son has risen. Initially, she does not believe, but then she decides to follow the apostle. As they walk through the streets of the historic center, the statues of Jesus and the Virgin meet in Piazza San Domenico. Suddenly, the black veil covering the Virgin is removed, replaced by a blue drape.

==== Patronal Feast in Honor of the Most Holy Crucifix ====
A key moment of the year is the patronal feast, held annually on the second Sunday of September. The celebration begins with a novena leading up to the feast day, attracting the faithful from across Italy to venerate the Crucifix. The traditional processions, accompanied by the festive sounds of the band, are also highly attended. During the feast, the town’s streets are adorned with illuminations, concerts, and fireworks displays. The “giants” dance, accompanied by the rhythm of the "tamburinari," and the traditional "fire horse" add to the festive atmosphere.

Another feast in honor of the Most Holy Crucifix takes place on November 16 each year.

==== Living Nativity ====
Through the Living Nativity, Grotteria seeks to reaffirm its religious, cultural, and historical traditions, emphasizing that Christmas is above all the day of the birth of Jesus Christ. This event takes place annually on December 26.

==== Saint Stephen, Pope and Martyr ====
On August 1st and 2nd, the districts beyond the Torrente of Grotteria celebrate Saint Stephen, Pope and Martyr, whose church is located in the homonymous district.

==== Our Lady of Grace ====
On the last Sunday of July, the locality of Farri and the surrounding districts celebrate Our Lady of Grace of Farri, the patroness of the Torbido Valley, venerated in the homonymous sanctuary.

== Economy ==
The climate once favored an agricultural economy primarily based on the production of wheat, olives, grapes, tomatoes, as well as sheep and goat farming, along with silk farming, which has now virtually disappeared.

From the once-thriving local craftsmanship—such as the production of pipes—the remnants today are minimal: a few remaining artisans like tailors, carpenters, shoemakers, blacksmiths, and barbers, who once had established schools, are now counted on one hand.

This decline is largely due to the massive emigration that began in the 1950s and continues unabated, effectively emptying the town (the population decreased to 3,611 by the 2001 census, and further to 3,381 by 2007), a trend common to many inland towns in Calabria.

== Infrastructure and Transportation ==
The municipality is served by the following roadways:

- Jonica
- di Mongiana
- Jonio-Tirreno
