= Giuseppe Cataldo =

Giuseppe Cataldo (Locri, September 19, 1938 − Locri, May 10, 2011), also known as Peppe, was an Italian criminal and a member of the 'Ndrangheta, a Mafia-type organisation in Calabria. He belonged to the Cataldo 'ndrina based in Locri.

== 'Ndrangheta heritage ==
The Cataldo clan, allied with the Marafioti family, is involved in a long blood feud with the Cordì 'ndrina, both based in Locri in the province of Reggio Calabria, in southern Italy, since the end of the 1960s. A series of hostilities continued until 1975 when the adversaries, weakened by losses on both sides, agreed to call a truce.

Giuseppe Cataldo rose to become the boss of the clan, not only because of his personal qualities, but also because of the eclipse of the former chief Bruno Marafioti after the killing of his brother and his son in 1969 by the Cordì clan. Marafioti became some kind of honorary president of the clan.

== Prominent 'Ndrangheta boss ==
In the 1970s, the Cataldos allied themselves with the De Stefano 'ndrina from Reggio Calabria in the First 'Ndrangheta war. Giuseppe and Nicola Cataldo were part of the hit squad, which also included Vincenzo, Giuseppe and Francesco Mazzaferro, that killed the traditional 'Ndrangheta boss Antonio Macrì and wounded Francesco Commisso, Macrì's right hand man.

Giuseppe Cataldo became a member of La Provincia, a provincial commission of the 'Ndrangheta formed at the end of the Second 'Ndrangheta war in September 1991, to avoid further internal conflicts.

== Arrest ==
On July 4, 1993, he was the target of a bomb attack when a bomb was thrown at the car driven by his wife. The car was completely destroyed but Cataldo and his wife miraculously survived. The attack broke the truce between the Cataldo and Cordì families that had been reached in 1975. A few months later he was arrested. He was sentenced to 24 years. Among other things, he was convicted for ordering the killing of Antonio Macrì, the historical 'Ndrangheta boss in the 1960s, who was killed in Siderno in 1975.

== Death ==
In 2009, he was released from prison after serving his sentence in the trial against 'Ndrangheta clans in the Locride. On May 10, 2011, he died from a heart failure at his house in Locri.
