= San Giovanni di Gerace =

- Comune
- Comune di San Giovanni di Gerace
- Location within Italy Location within Calabria
- Coordinates: 38°22′N 16°17′E
- Country: Italy
- Region: Calabria
- Metropolitan city: Reggio Calabria (RC)

Area
  - Total: 13.3 km^{2} (5.1 sq mi)

Population (Dec. 2004)
  - Total: 577
  - Density: 43.4/km^{2} (112/sq mi)
- Time zone: UTC+1 (CET)
  - Summer (DST): UTC+2 (CEST)
- Postal code: 89040
- Dialing code: 0964

San Giovanni di Gerace (Greek-Calabrian dialect: Ièrax) is a comune (municipality) in the Province of Reggio Calabria in the Italian region Calabria, located about 70 kilometres (43 mi) southwest of Catanzaro and about 60 kilometres (37 mi) northeast of Reggio Calabria. As of 31 December 2004, it had a population of 577 and an area of 13.3 square kilometres (5.1 mi^{2}).

San Giovanni di Gerace borders the following municipalities: Grotteria, Martone.

== Demographic evolution ==
Historical population

Year	Pop.	±%
1861	1,670	—
1871	1,591	−4.7%
1881	1,513	−4.9%
1901	1,606	+6.1%
1911	1,762	+9.7%

Year	Pop.	±%
1921	2,019	+14.6%
1931	1,853	−8.2%
1936	1,815	−2.1%
1951	1,737	−4.3%
1961	1,246	−28.3%

Year	Pop.	±%
1971	946	−24.1%
1981	813	−14.1%
1991	748	−8.0%
2001	609	−18.6%

Source: Data from ISTAT
