= Salvatore Aquino =

Italian criminal (1944–2025)

- Born: February 28, 1944
- Died: February 18, 2025 (aged 80); Marina di Gioiosa Ionica, Italy
- Other name: "Turi"
- Years active: 1970s–1999
- Organization: 'Ndrangheta
- Known for: Boss of the Aquino 'ndrina, involvement in drug trafficking and cigarette smuggling
- Opponent: Mazzaferro clan
- Board member of: Camera di Controllo (member)
- Status: Convicted
- Convictions: 13 February 1999
- Criminal charges: Criminal association, international drug trafficking
- Penalty: 15 years imprisonment

Details
- Country: Italy

Salvatore Aquino (29 February 1944 – 18 February 2025), also known as "Turi", was an Italian criminal and a member of the 'Ndrangheta in Calabria, in southern Italy. He was the boss of the Aquino 'ndrina from Marina di Gioiosa Ionica and closely related to Giuseppe Coluccio, a key intermediary in the intercontinental drug trade.

== Biography ==
The Aquino clan is opposed to the Mazzaferro clan from the same town. In the 1970s, his clan entered into the smuggling of cigarettes, which led to a bloody feud with the Mazzaferro-Femia.

He was a member of the Camera di Controllo, a provincial commission of the 'Ndrangheta formed at the end of the Second 'Ndrangheta war in September 1991 to avoid further internal conflicts.

He was involved in running a heroin lab in Rota d'Imagna in the province of Bergamo that was discovered in 1990. On 13 February 1999, in Marina di Gioiosa Ionica, he was sentenced to 15 years for criminal association and international drug trafficking.

After many years in prison, Aquino was released due to his poor health and returned to live in Marina di Gioiosa Ionica. Aquino died on 18 February 2025, at the age of 80.

== Bibliography ==
- (in Italian) Gratteri, Nicola & Antonio Nicaso (2006). Fratelli di Sangue, Cosenza: Luigi Pellegrini Editore ISBN 88-8101-373-8
