= Rocco B. Commisso =

Italian and American businessman (1949–2026)

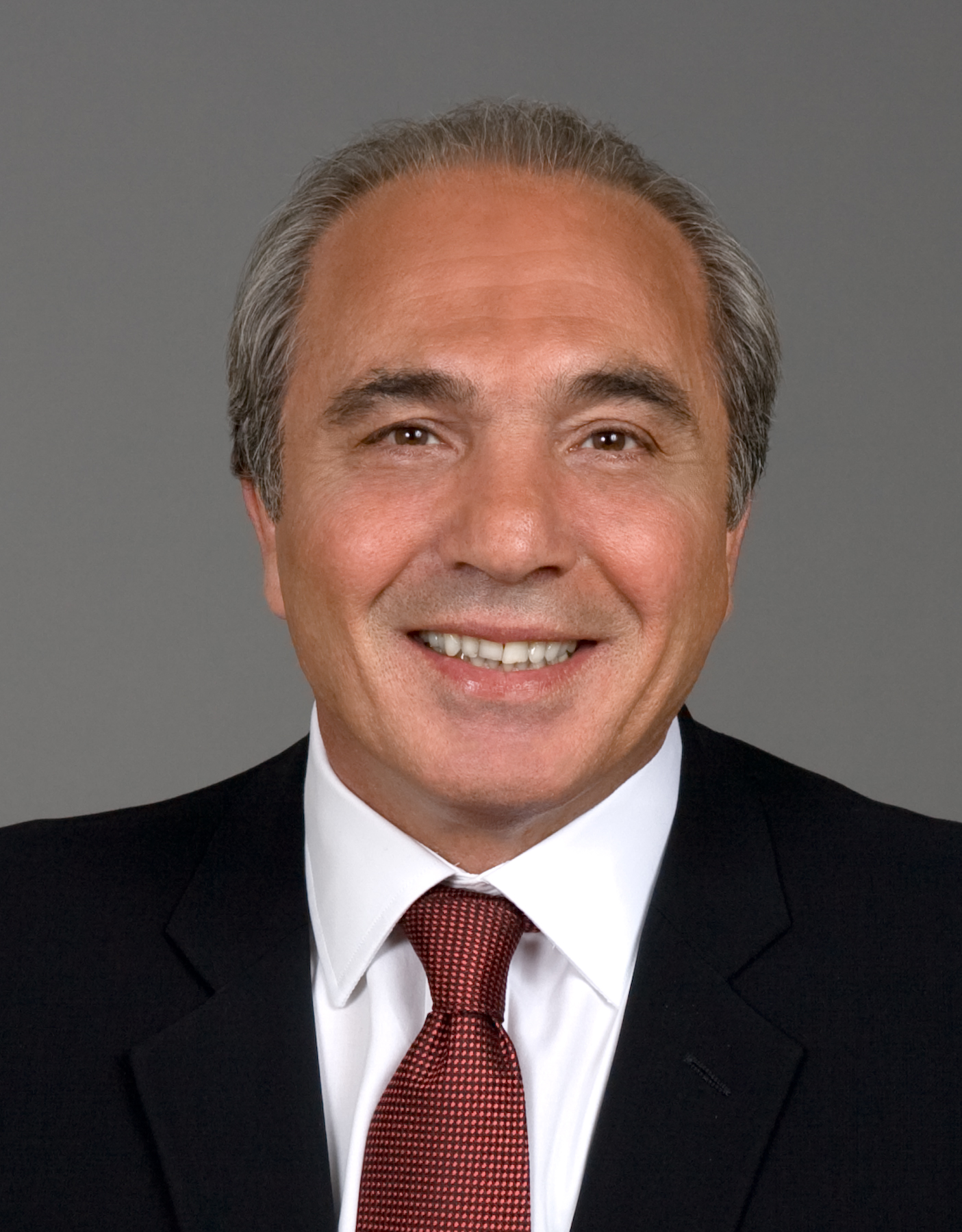
- Commisso in 2007
- Born: Rocco Benito Commisso; November 25, 1949; Marina di Gioiosa Ionica, Italy
- Died: January 16, 2026 (aged 76); New York City, U.S.
- Resting place: Maryrest Cemetery & Mausoleum, Mahwah, New Jersey, U.S.
- Citizenship: Italy; United States
- Education: Columbia University (BSc, MBA)
- Occupation: Businessman
- Known for: Founder of Mediacom; Owner of New York Cosmos; Owner of Fiorentina
- Board member of: NCTA; C-SPAN; CableLabs
- Spouse: Catherine Commisso
- Children: 2
- Awards: Ellis Island Medal of Honor

Rocco Benito Commisso (Italian: [ˈrɔkko komˈmisso]; November 25, 1949 – January 16, 2026) was an Italian and American billionaire businessman, and the founder, chairman, and chief executive officer (CEO) of Mediacom, the fifth largest cable television company in the United States. As of 2011, the company was privately owned by Commisso. He previously worked for companies including Cablevision, the Royal Bank of Canada, and Chase Manhattan Bank. From 2017, Commisso was the owner and chairman of the New York Cosmos, and from June 2019, the owner of the Italian football club Fiorentina.

== Early life and education ==
Born in Marina di Gioiosa Ionica, Calabria, Italy, Commisso migrated to the United States at age 12. Commisso attended Mount Saint Michael Academy high school in the Bronx and attended Columbia University on a full undergraduate scholarship where he earned a bachelor's degree in industrial engineering in 1971 from its School of Engineering and Applied Science. He earned an MBA in 1975 from Columbia Business School. He was co-captain of Columbia's varsity soccer team; elected president of the business school student body; and received the business school service award.

== Career ==
Commisso began his business career at Pfizer. After returning to Columbia and graduating from business school, he spent ten years in the financial industry, initially at Chase Manhattan Bank (now J.P. Morgan Chase). In 1978, he began working with cable companies and other entertainment enterprises as a part of Chase's corporate financing department. He later worked at Royal Bank of Canada, where he led the bank's U.S. lending activities to the media and communications sectors. From 1986 to 1995, he was executive vice president, chief financial officer, and director of Cablevision Industries Corporation. During this time, Cablevision Industries grew from the 25th to the 8th largest cable company in the United States, with around 1.3 million customers at the time of its merger with Time Warner.

Commisso was the chairman and CEO of Mediacom Communications Corporation from the time when he founded the company in 1995 out of his basement. Initially, Mediacom acquired cable systems in underserved smaller American communities. Commisso took Mediacom public in 2000 after which time it grew to become the 8th largest cable operator in the United States with annual revenues of over $1.6 billion. In March 2011, the company then went private and wholly owned by Commisso. Since that time Mediacom was named the best cable company in the US in 2016, and in 2009 by CableFAX magazine. Commisso also served on the board of directors of the National Cable & Telecommunications Association, C-SPAN, and Cable Television Laboratories, Inc. He was also a member of the Cable TV Pioneers.

== Soccer/football ==
=== Columbia University Lions ===
Commisso played soccer for the Columbia University Lions in the 1967–1970 period. He was a three-time All-Ivy League honoree. In 1967, Commisso was a member of a freshman squad that finished with an undefeated record of 8–0. Commisso served as co-captain of the 1970 team that went 9-4-0 and made Columbia's first ever appearance in the NCAA men's soccer tournament. Throughout his college soccer career, Commisso was cited numerous times for his skill and leadership culminating in an invitation to try out for the US team for the 1972 Summer Olympics.

From his time as a student, Commisso was a contributor to Columbia men's soccer program. From 1978 to 1986, he was Chairman of Friends of Columbia Soccer. Presently, Columbia awards an annual men's soccer prize in his name. On October 12, 2013, Columbia University named its soccer venue at the school's Baker Athletics Complex as the Rocco B. Commisso Soccer Stadium. In 2015, he was named a NYC Soccer Gala honoree. Commisso was inducted into the 2016 Columbia University Athletics Hall of Fame special category.

=== New York Cosmos ===
In January 2017, Commisso purchased a majority ownership stake in the New York Cosmos soccer club and became the club's new chairman. As the owner, he moved the team's games to MCU Park in Coney Island. At the time, both the team and its league (the North American Soccer League) were struggling financially, and the move was seen as a sign of support for both. At the time, several of the other bids for the team were to shut down the franchise in order to prevent it from remaining a competitive threat in the league.

The North American Soccer League (NASL) filed an antitrust lawsuit against the United States Soccer Federation (USSF) and Major League Soccer (MLS) in 2017 after the USSF declined to renew the NASL’s Division II sanctioning status. The league alleged that the USSF, in coordination with MLS, had imposed and enforced sanctioning standards designed to favor MLS and limit competition from rival leagues. NASL owners, including Commisso, argued that the federation’s relationship with MLS helped maintain a closed-league structure without promotion and relegation, which they claimed restricted the ability of competing leagues to operate at the highest levels of professional soccer in the United States. In February 2025, a federal jury ruled in favor of USSF and MLS, rejecting NASL’s antitrust claims and bringing the case to a close after several years of litigation. The NASL announced it was appealing the decision, which will be reviewed by a three-judge panel on the U.S. Court of Appeals for the Second Circuit.

In July 2025, Commisso sold the rights to the Cosmos name and identity to a USL League One expansion team that was then known as North Jersey Pro Soccer. That team was subsequently announced as the third incarnation of the Cosmos, and Commisso joined the ownership of the club as minority owner.

=== Fiorentina ===
On June 6, 2019, the purchase of Fiorentina by Commisso was formalized giving him recognition for field development. The purchase was finalized on June 24, 2019. It is believed that Commisso bought Fiorentina for somewhere between $150–200 million. Commisso was planning to grow Fiorentina's brand in the US market. The club's first venture was to see it play in the preseason tournament, the International Champions Cup 2019. In the spring of 2020, Commisso led a GoFundMe campaign, Forza e Cuore, to raise over $1 million (€872,000) for hospitals in Florence during the coronavirus pandemic. In the fall of 2023, Commisso commissioned Viola Park, a state-of-the-art sports training center hosting the Fiorentina men's, women's, and youth teams, opened in Bagno a Ripoli in the outskirts of Florence. This new facility was designed by architect Marco Casamonti, and spans over 31 hectares (77 acres).

== Recognition ==
In 2004, on the 250th anniversary of Columbia's founding, the school's newspaper, the Columbia Spectator, listed Commisso among Columbia's 250 greatest undergraduate alumni of all time. The school of business also recognized him as a Select Distinguished Alumni. Commisso was the recipient of the Ernst & Young Entrepreneur of the Year Award for the Southwest Connecticut/New York Hudson Valley region, the Innovator Award for Business Strategy from Cablevision magazine, and the National Italian American Foundation Lifetime Achievement Award. In 2007, he was inducted into the Broadcasting & Cable Hall of Fame. In 2008, he served as co-chair of the Cable Show staged in New Orleans. In 2009, Commisso was presented with the Vanguard Award for Distinguished Leadership, the cable industry's highest honor. In 2010, he was welcomed into the SUNY New Paltz School of Business Hall of Fame and named Business Person of the Year. In June 2011, Commisso was inducted into the Cable Center Hall of Fame. In 2015, he was awarded the Ellis Island Medal of Honour. In 2018, Commisso was inducted into the National Italian American Sports Hall of Fame.

== Personal life and death ==
Commisso was married to Catherine, they had two children, and lived in Saddle River, New Jersey. As of 2015, Catherine Commisso is head of corporate administration for Mediacom. Commisso died on January 16, 2026, at the age of 76, "after a prolonged period of medical treatment." Commisso's funeral was held on January 21 at St. Patrick's Cathedral on Fifth Avenue in New York City. Commisso was buried at Maryrest Cemetery & Mausoleum, Mahwah, New Jersey. A memorial mass for Commisso was celebrated in Florence, at the Cathedral of Santa Maria del Fiore on January 26.
