= Battle of the Sagra =

The Battle of the Sagra was fought in the 6th century BC between the Greek cities of Locri Epizefiri and Croton. The battle took place along the Sagra river. This river cannot be precisely identified, but may be the present-day Torbido or the Allaro, in the Province of Reggio Calabria, southern Italy.

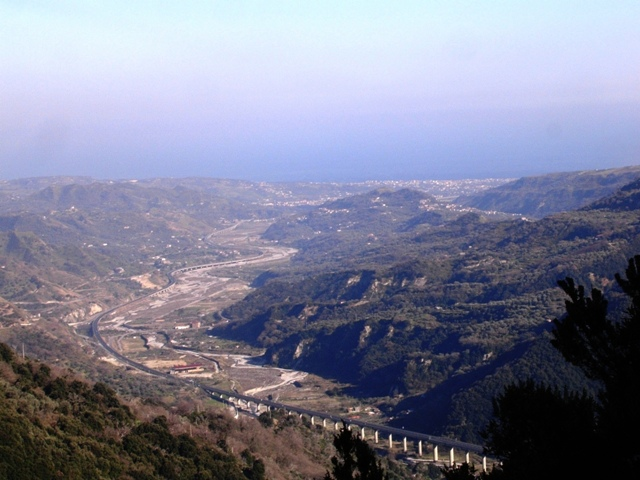
Aerial view of possible site of battle, showing Sagra river

== Background ==
A coalition of the cities Metapontum, Sybaris and Croton had besieged and captured Siris. According to Justin Croton attacked Locri afterwards because the latter had sent aid to Siris when it was under siege. It has been suggested that Justin was wrong and that strained relations between Locri and Caulonia were the cause instead. Because the foundation of Caulonia was supported by Croton, the conflict between Locri and Croton developed. An explanation which incorporates both possibilities is that Locri attacked Caulonia while Croton was occupied with the siege of Siris.

== Battle ==
The date of the battle is uncertain and proposals for it vary widely, ranging from the end of the seventh century BC to after 510 BC. Peter Bicknell proposes a more specific date of either 580 or 576 BC, but most scholars date the battle to the middle of the sixth century BC. Some have considered the inscriptions on a bronze trophy from Olympia to be related to the battle. The inscription reads: "the citizens of Hipponium and Medma and Locri dedicated [this] as booty from the Crotoniates". Bicknell thinks this inscription refers to a later conflict because Hipponium was acquired by Locri fairly late. He suggests a date of 500–480 BC for the trophy because Locri took Temesa from Croton around this time. In advance of the battle Locri requested help from Sparta, but the Spartans replied that they should seek help from the Dioscuri, who according to legend helped them defeat Croton.

According to Strabo the city Rhegion was allied with Locri and sent a contingent to their aid. He gives 10,000 men as the size of their army, but it is not clear if this includes or excludes the Rhegians. He provides a number of 130,000 for the army of Croton. Justin mentions a number of 15,000 Locrians versus 120,000 Crotoniates. Because Justin makes no mention of the Rhegians it is thought that they numbered 5,000 based on Strabo's numbers. The very large size of the Crotoniate army must have been a severe exaggeration. Justin and Strabo claim the news of the battle reached the Peloponnese in a single day.

== Aftermath ==
In Justin's account Pythagoras arrived in Croton after the battle and instituted an austere regime. Strabo attributes the decline of Croton to the heavy casualties it suffered during the battle. For Locri it was instead the start of a more and more aggressive policy towards neighbouring cities, subsequently leading to a rupture in its alliance with Rhegion. There is evidence that a cult to the Dioscuri was present in Locri in the beginning of the fifth century BC, which probably began as a result of the battle.

== Sources ==
=== Primary sources ===
- Diodorus Siculus (1939). Oldfather, C. H. (ed.). Library of History. Vol. 3. Cambridge, Massachusetts: Harvard University Press. ISBN 978-0-674-99375-4.
- Justin (1853). Watson, John Selby (ed.). Epitome of the Philippic History of Pompeius Trogus. London: Henry G. Bohn.
- Strabo (1924). Jones, H. L. (ed.). Geography. Vol. 3. Cambridge, Massachusetts: Harvard University Press. ISBN 978-0-674-99201-6.

=== Secondary sources ===
- Bicknell, Peter (1966). "The Date of the Battle of the Sagra River". Phoenix. 20 (4): 294–301. doi:10.2307/1087054. JSTOR 1087054.
- Krentz, Peter (1985). "Casualties in Hoplite Battles" (PDF). Greek, Roman and Byzantine Studies. 26 (1): 13–20. Archived from the original (PDF) on 2014-02-01.
- Sourvinou-Inwood, Christiane (1974). "The Votum of 477/6 B. C. and the Foundation Legend of Locri Epizephyrii". The Classical Quarterly. 24 (2): 186–198. doi:10.1017/s0009838800032729. JSTOR 638480.
- Spatari, Nik (2002). L'enigma delle arti asittite nella Calabria ultra-mediterranea (in Italian). Reggio Calabria: Iiriti Editore.
- Wonder, John W. (2012). "The Italiote League: South Italian Alliances of the Fifth and Fourth Centuries BC". Classical Antiquity. 31 (1): 128–151. doi:10.1525/CA.2012.31.1.128.
