= Mazzaferro 'ndrina =

Calabrian organized crime group

- Founded: 1960s
- Founding location: Marina di Gioiosa Ionica, Calabria, Italy
- Years active: 1960s–present
- Territory: Marina di Gioiosa Ionica in Calabria; Liguria and Piedmont in Northern Italy. Presence also in Belgium, United Kingdom and Germany
- Ethnicity: Calabrians
- Criminal activities: Drug trafficking, infiltration in public administration, extortion, gambling, murder
- Allies: Cataldo 'ndrina Lo Presti 'ndrina Costa 'ndrina Ierinò 'ndrina Morabito 'ndrina De Stefano 'ndrina Inzerillo crime family
- Rivals: Aquino 'ndrina Commisso 'ndrina Cordi 'ndrina Ursino 'ndrina

The Mazzaferro 'ndrina is a clan of the 'Ndrangheta, a criminal and mafia-type organization in Calabria, Italy. The 'ndrina is based in Marina di Gioiosa Ionica.

In Northern Italy they are present in the Riviera di Levante in Liguria and in Turin, Susa and Bardonecchia. In Piedmont, the contact person was their cousin Rocco Lo Presti, historic 'Ndrangheta boss of Bardonecchia and Val di Susa. Outside Italy the 'ndrina is present in Belgium, Germany and in the United Kingdom.

The Mazzaferro were also present in the regions of Veneto and Lombardy, where the ndrina had created many "locali". However, in recent years, a law enforcement operation has led to the arrest of many affiliates, decimating the organization in these two regions.

== History ==
In the 1970s, the 'ndrina entered the cigarette smuggling business, and a feud broke out, which still pits the Aquino-Scalis on one side and the Mazzaferro-Femias on the other.

In the nineties, Giuseppe Mazzaferro, one of the first to settle in Lombardy, was among the main drug buyers of the Cosa Nostra's Cuntrera-Caruana family.

From Operation Rajssa and Anecdoto the exploitation of banks in Gioiosa Jonica, Roccella Jonica and Platì for usury in the Locride, Vibo and Milan areas were discovered. On 13 January 1993, Vincenzo Mazzaferro, the undisputed head of the family, was killed in Marina di Gioiosa Jonica. A few months earlier, the boss had confided to the Carabinieri captain Angelo Jannone that he feared for his life, having mediated the release from kidnapping of the young Brescian Roberta Ghidini. The captain, in turn, suffered threats of attacks whose plan was revealed by a repentant, and for this reason, he was transferred to another location. In the operation it was also discovered that the Mazzaferros had created 16 "locali" in Lombardy, three of them in the city of Milan alone, 6 in the province of Como: Como, Fino Mornasco, Appiano Gentile, Mariano Comense, Senna Comasco and Cermenate, 3 in the province of Monza and Brianza: Monza, Seregno and Lentate sul Seveso, one in Pavia, one in Varese, one in the province of Brescia in Lumezzane and one in Rho, in the province of Milan.

In 1994, with the law enforcement operation The Flowers of the Night of San Vito, 370 precautionary custody orders were issued in Lombardy. The operation shed light on how deeply rooted the 'Ndrangheta was in the region, especially in the Como and Varese areas and thus revealed the prominent role that Giuseppe Mazzaferro had there.

In January 2013, Nicola, known as Rocco, Femia was arrested in Ravenna together with 28 other people, who had set up an illegal gambling ring between Ravenna and the Modena area of rigged machines and illegal gambling websites.

The Operation Ossessione ended on 29 January 2019, leading to the arrest of 25 people, including alleged members of the Mancuso 'ndrina in association with Albanian criminals (Elisabeta Kotja), Moroccans and Colombian, Venezuelan (Clara Ines Garcia Rebolledo) and Dominican narcos for an international drug trafficking including Albanian and Moroccan cocaine and hashish and with the criminal Giuseppe Campisi together with the Mazzaferros for the Milan hinterland and Carlo Cuccia and Ivo Menotta as custodians of the weapons in Tradate.

== Feud with Aquino clan ==
In the '70s, they entered into the smuggling of cigarettes, and the feud broke out, which still sees the Aquino-Scali 'ndrina opposed on the one hand and the Mazzaferro-Femia 'ndrina on the other.

== See also ==
- Francesco Mazzaferro
- Rocco Lo Presti
- List of 'ndrine
