= Mazzacurati =

Mazzacurati is a family name of Italian origin literally translating 'priest-killer'. It may refer to:

- Anna Maria Mazzacurati (born 1944), Italian javelin thrower
- Carlo Mazzacurati (1956–2014), Italian film director and screenwriter
- Italo Mazzacurati (1932–2013), Italian racing cyclist
- Marino Mazzacurati (1907–1969), Italian painter and sculptor
- Mario Mazzacurati (1903–1985), Italian engineer and auto racer driver
- Rosy Mazzacurati (1935–2020), Italian film and stage actress
