= Mazzacane =

Mazzacane is an Italian surname literally translating to 'dog-killer'. Notable people with the surname include:

- Gastón Mazzacane (born 1975), Argentine racing driver
- Loren Mazzacane Connors (born 1949), American guitarist
