= Cataldo 'ndrina =

Criminal organisation clan in Italy

- Founded: 1960s
- Founding location: Locri, Calabria, Italy
- Years active: 1960s-present
- Territory: Locri, affiliates of the clan in northern Italy
- Ethnicity: Calabrians
- Criminal activities: Drug trafficking
- Allies: Marafioti 'ndrina, De Stefano 'ndrina, Sergi 'ndrina and Marando 'ndrina
- Rivals: Cordì 'ndrina

The Cataldo 'ndrina is a clan of the 'Ndrangheta, a criminal and mafia-type organisation in Calabria, Italy. This particular 'ndrina is based in Locri, a hotbed of 'Ndrangheta activity. The clan, allied with the Marafioti family, is involved in a long blood feud with the Cordì 'ndrina, from the same town, since the end of the 1960s.

== Feud with Cordì clan ==
The feud started when historical boss of the clan, Domenico Cordì, was killed in Locri on June 23, 1967, in the so-called Piazza Mercato massacre. Two years after the killing, the Cordì clan hit back, killing Giuseppe and Domenico Marafioti, respectively the brother and son of Bruno Marafioti, boss of the clan and allied with the Cataldos. A series of hostilities continued until 1975 when the adversaries, weakened by losses on both sides, agreed to a truce.

The truce fell apart, due a bomb attack on July 4, 1993, against the boss of the Cataldo clan, Giuseppe Cataldo. He was the target of a bomb which was thrown at the car driven by his wife. The car was completely destroyed, but Cataldo and his wife miraculously survived. Hostilities between the two clans resumed.

In 2010, police investigations based on intercepted conversations and government witnesses revealed that the Cordì and Cataldo clans signed a peace after a bitter feud that lasted for 40 years causing dozens of deaths. They formed a strong alliance aimed at a joint management of the crime business in the area, in particular in obtaining public work contracts and the extortion industry.

== Important 'Ndrangheta clan ==
In the 1970s, the Cataldos allied themselves with the De Stefano 'ndrina from Reggio Calabria in the First 'Ndrangheta war. Giuseppe and Nicola Cataldo were part of the hit squad, which also included Vincenzo, Giuseppe and Francesco Mazzaferro, that killed the traditional 'Ndrangheta boss Antonio Macrì and wounded Francesco Commisso, Macrì's right hand man.

Giuseppe Cataldo became a member of La Provincia, a provincial commission of the 'Ndrangheta, formed at the end of the Second 'Ndrangheta war in September 1991, to avoid further internal conflicts.

The Cataldo clan was also involved in cocaine trafficking from Colombia with the Sicilian Cuntrera-Caruana Mafia clan. In March 1994 the Italian police seized 5497 kilogrammes of cocaine (a European record at the time) in Borgaro Torinese near Turin (the investigation was code-named Operation Cartagine). A joint venture of 'Ndrangheta clans in the trafficking included the Barbaro 'ndrina (Platì), Ierinò 'ndrina (Gioiosa Ionica), Morabito 'ndrina (Africo), Mazzaferro 'ndrina (Gioiosa Ionica) and Pesce 'ndrina (Rosarno).

== Recent developments ==
On December 27, 2005, Francesco Cataldo, who is considered to be the acting boss of the clan since the imprisonment of Giuseppe Cataldo, was arrested alone in a deserted house and unarmed. He was charged with commanding the killing of Salvatore Cordì on May 31, 2005, the leader of the opposing clan. The killing of Salvatore Cordì was a retribution for the killing of the younger Giuseppe Cataldo, the namesake nephew of the clan's boss, three months earlier, on February 15, 2005.

On December 18, 2008, police arrested Antonio Cataldo for ordering the killing of Cordì, jointly with three of the material killers. Ten days earlier, his cousin and namesake, had been arrested. He was convicted to 30 years imprisonment for drug trafficking.

In May 2008, 48 arrest warrants were issued against members of the Cataldo, Sergi and Marando 'ndrine for drug trafficking. The Sergi-Marando clan imported cocaine from Colombia and hashish from Morocco, while the Cataldos distributed the drugs to Lombardy, Piemonte, Veneto and Emilia Romagna through affiliates of the clan in northern Italy.
