= Gioiosa Ionica =

- Comune
- Comune di Gioiosa Ionica
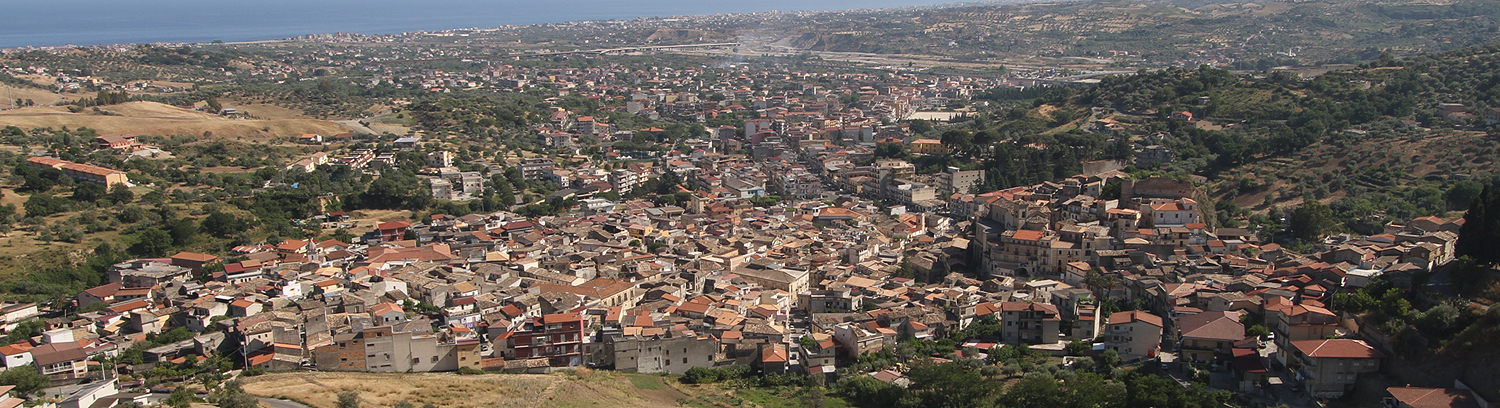

- Location within Italy Location within Calabria
- Coordinates: 38°20′N 16°18′E
- Country: Italy
- Region: Calabria
- Metropolitan city: Reggio Calabria (RC)

Area
  - Total: 35 km^{2} (14 sq mi)

Population (2018-01-01)
  - Total: 7,059
  - Density: 200/km^{2} (520/sq mi)
- Time zone: UTC+1 (CET)
  - Summer (DST): UTC+2 (CEST)
- Patron saint: St. Roch
- Website: Official website

Gioiosa Ionica (Calabrian: 'A Gejusa) is a town and comune in Italy in the province of Reggio Calabria, region of Calabria. It lies near the east coast of Calabria and covers an area of 35 square kilometres (14 mi^{2}).

The remains of a theatre belonging to the Roman period were discovered in 1883 at Marina di Gioiosa Ionica.

== Archaeological sites ==
=== Villa Naniglio ===
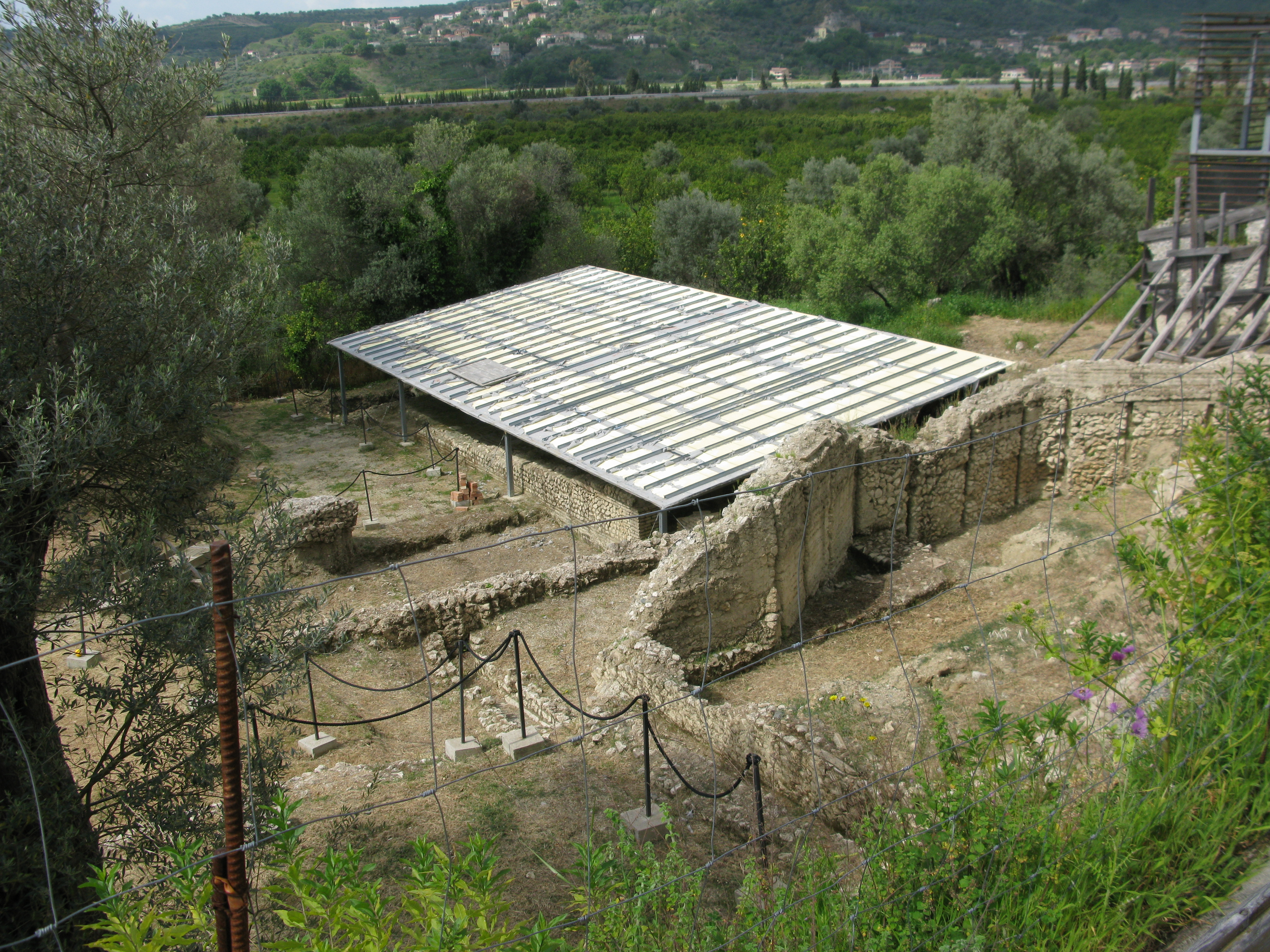
Villa Naniglio

Outside the historic centre of the town is the Roman Villa of Naniglio, located on a hill sloping towards the coast in a panoramic position overlooking the Torbido river valley and a few kilometers from the sea, about 18km north of the archaeological site of ancient Locri.

It was an imposing and highly prestigious villa built towards the end of the 1st century BC and reached its maximum splendour around the 3rd century AD. It was expanded until the 4th-5th century AD before being hit by a natural event (probably a flood) which caused its complete abandonment. It is conceivable that use continued in some rooms from finds of ceramic material dating to the 6th and 9th centuries.

The plan is an elongated main body, with two smaller wings attached at the ends. The archaeological excavations between 1981 and 1986 by Alfonso de Franciscis brought to light the residential sector of 3 main rooms with polychrome mosaic floors with geometric motifs and painted wall plaster. Excavations in 2010 brought to light a large octagonal room at the end of the residential wing and several water channels, one of which probably connected to the cistern. The mosaic in room A is a rosette in black and white but with beautiful coloured tesserae in the centre where brightly coloured glass paste tiles were used, rare for a floor mosaic, more usual for those on walls. Glass tiles were expensive and were used to make jewellery or replace missing precious stones in jewellery. The mosaic has two patterns of decoration to separate the space: it was probably a cubiculum where the rectangular area was occupied by a bed and the rose, often used in the 1st century AD, designated a free space.

Of great interest due to its exceptional state of preservation is the large underground cistern of the 2nd-3rd centuries lying under the modern road, with three aisles supported by eight square pillars arranged in two rows, covered by cross vaults with a central skylight. The main access was by a spectacular spiral staircase of 24 steps around a circular pillar which protrudes from the roof and on top of which is a dome. Built in a later phase on one of the short sides of the cistern are two small rooms covered by barrel vaults. Of particular interest, the eastern one has a votive shrine and an altar with traces of decorations which indicate this was a nymphaeum.

To the south of the cistern is a bath complex not yet excavated.

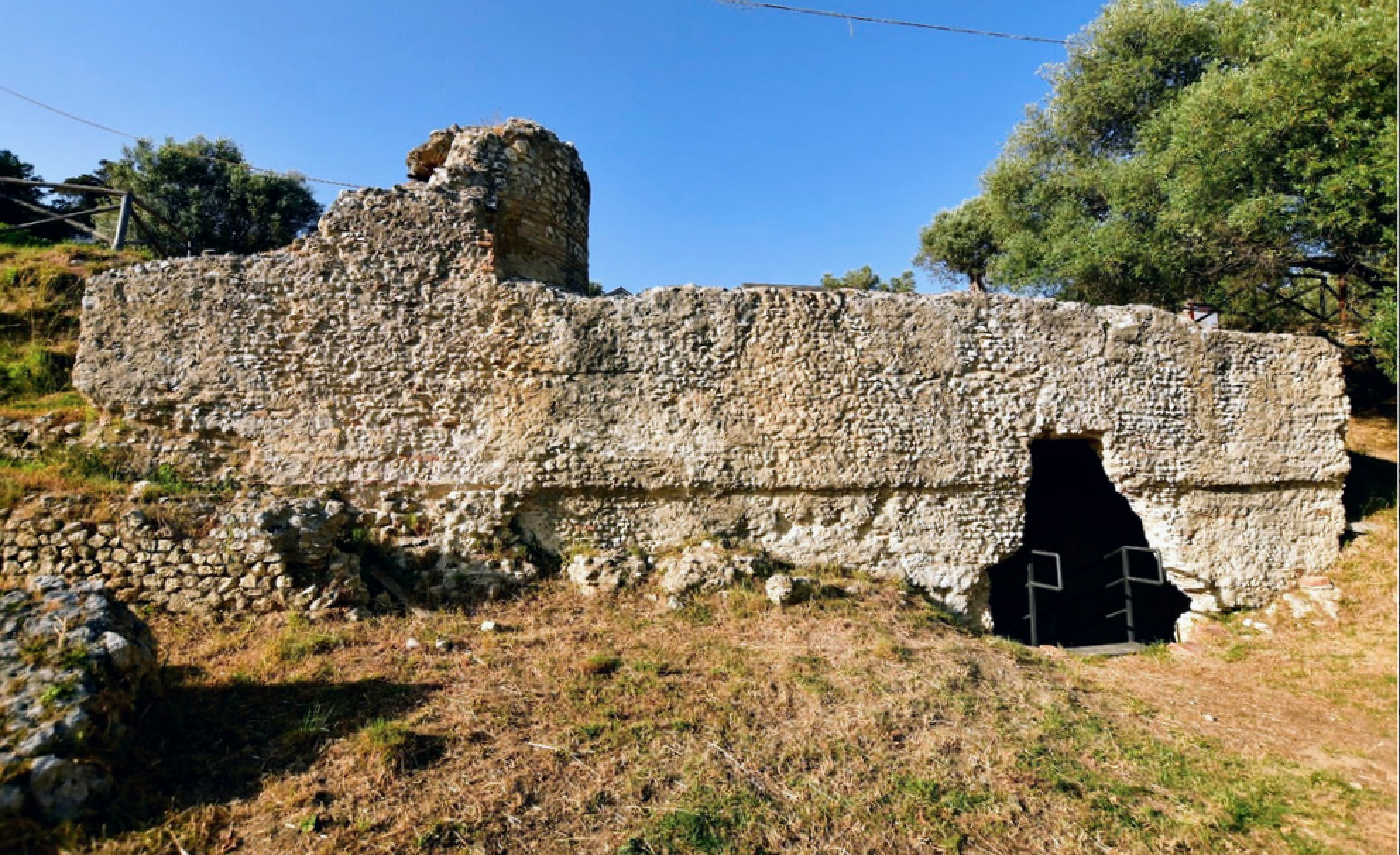
Cistern villa Naniglio

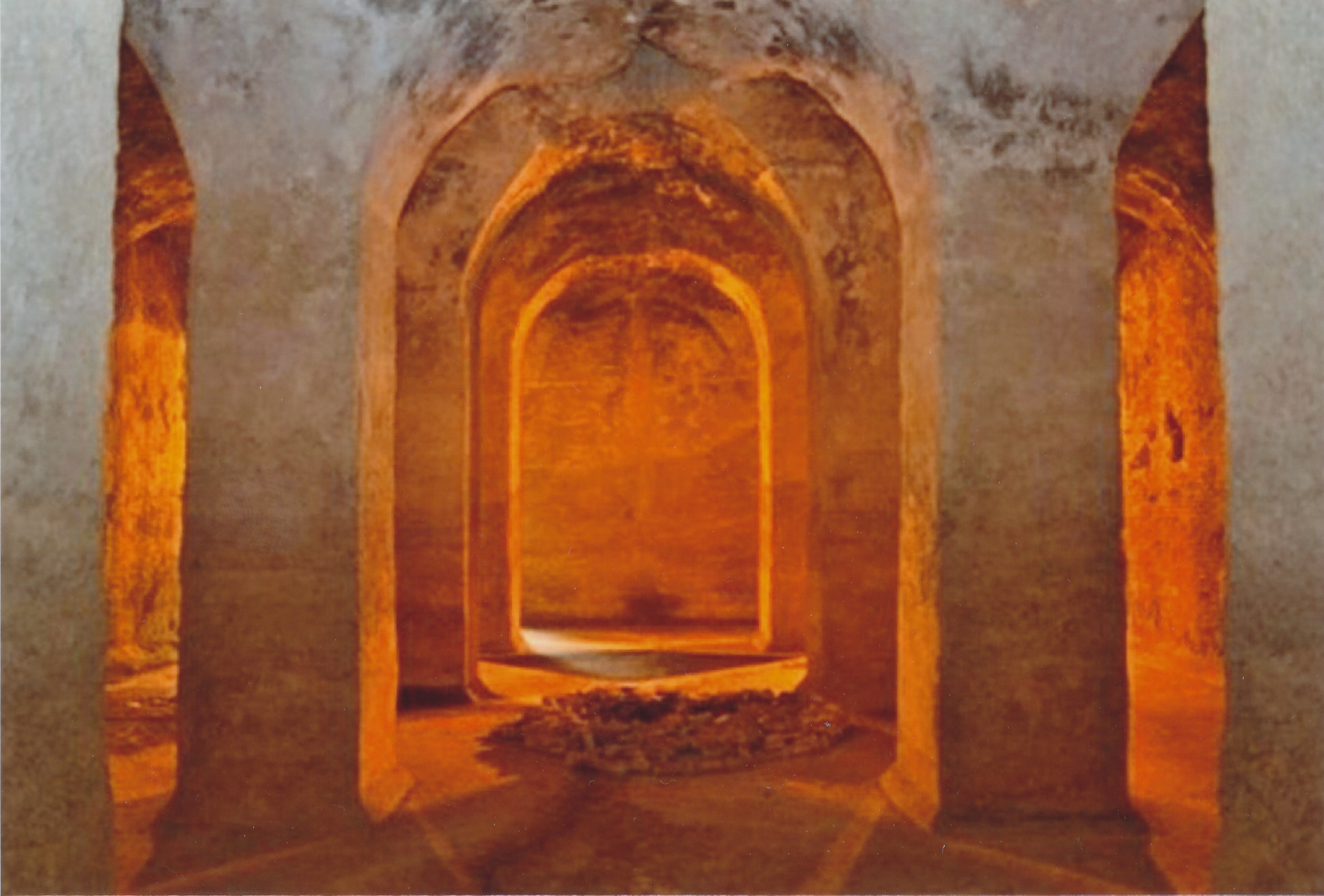
cistern

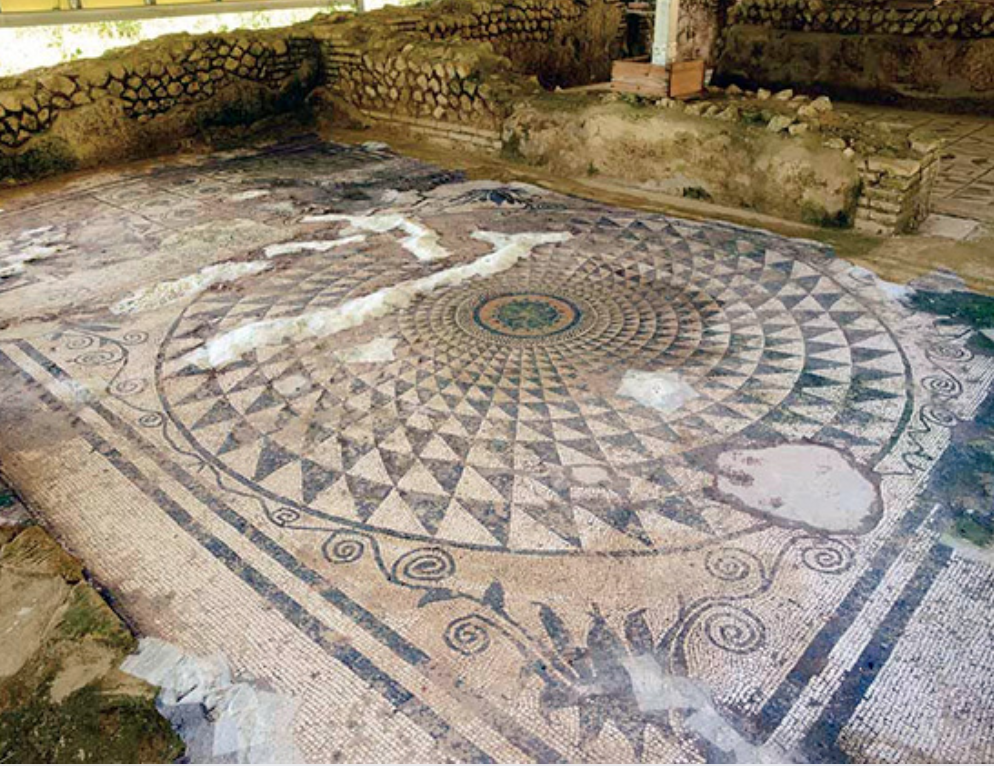
mosaic - Room A
