= Marina di Gioiosa Ionica =

- Comune
- Comune di Marina di Gioiosa Ionica
- Location within Italy Location within Calabria
- Coordinates: 38°18′N 16°20′E
- Country: Italy
- Region: Calabria
- Metropolitan city: Reggio Calabria (RC)
- Frazioni: Junchi, Camocelli superiore, Camocelli inferiore, Cavalleria, Cerchietto, Drusù, Galea, Giardini, Lenza, Ligonia Carella, Ligonia Drusù, Pantalogna, Pantano, Porticato, Romanò, San Pietro, Spilinga, Torre Galea Carri Fragastò

Area
  - Total: 15.9 km^{2} (6.1 sq mi)

Population (2018-01-01)
  - Total: 6,603
  - Density: 415/km^{2} (1,080/sq mi)
- Demonym: Gioiosani o Marinari
- Time zone: UTC+1 (CET)
  - Summer (DST): UTC+2 (CEST)

Marina di Gioiosa Ionica (Calabrian: 'A Marina) is a comune (municipality) in the Province of Reggio Calabria in the Italian region Calabria, located about 80 kilometres (50 mi) southwest of Catanzaro and about 120 kilometres (75 mi) northeast of Reggio Calabria. As of 30 September 2017, it had a population of 6,615 and an area of 15.9 square kilometres (6.1 mi^{2}).

The municipality of Marina di Gioiosa Ionica contains the frazioni (subdivisions, mainly villages and hamlets) Junchi, Camocelli superiore, Camocelli inferiore and many others.

Marina di Gioiosa Ionica borders the following municipalities: Gioiosa Ionica, Grotteria, Roccella Ionica.

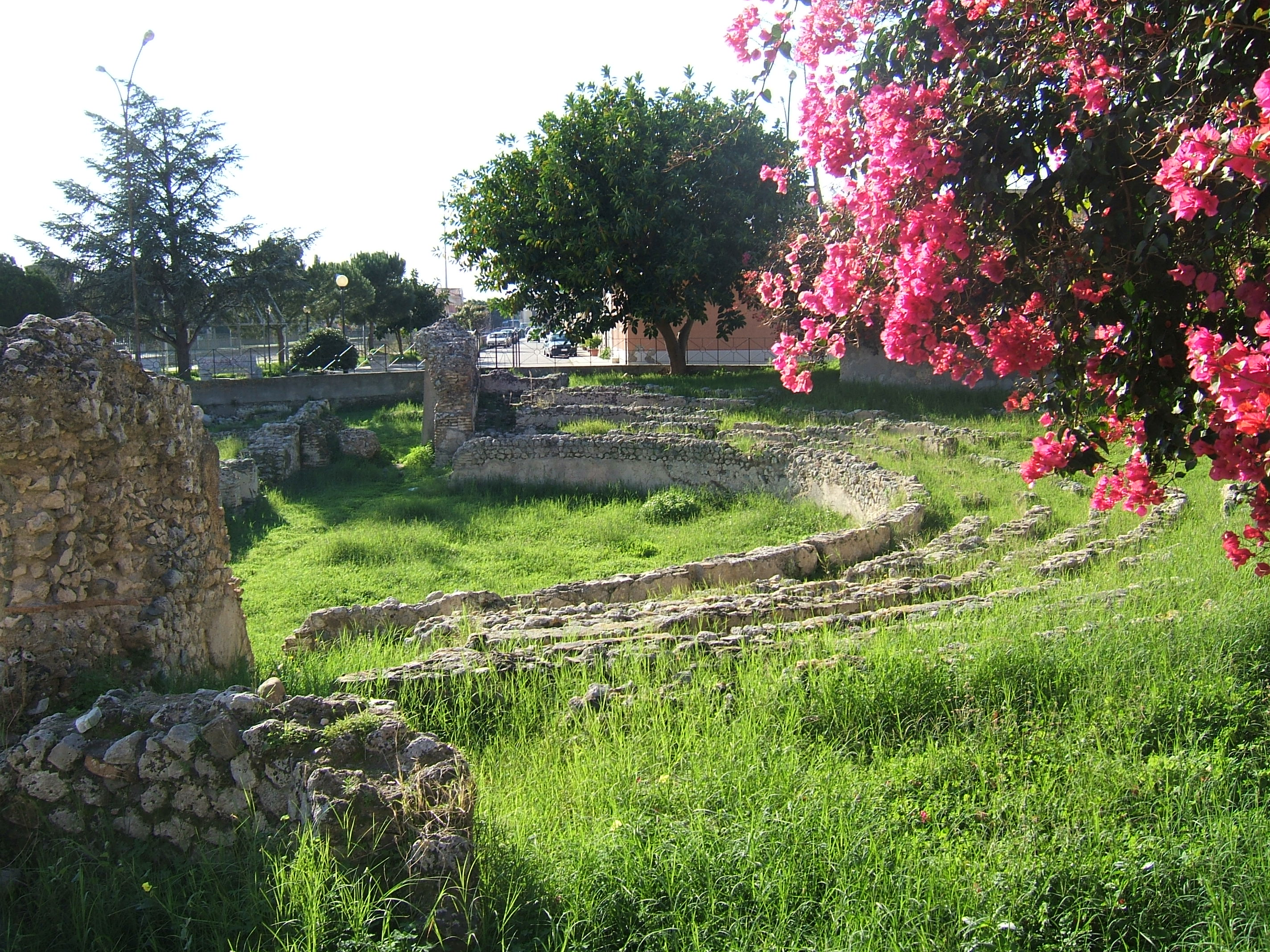
Roman Theatre

== Demographic evolution ==
Historical population

Year	Pop.	±%
1861	2,829	—
1871	2,755	−2.6%
1881	3,219	+16.8%
1901	3,844	+19.4%
1911	4,250	+10.6%

Year	Pop.	±%
1921	4,644	+9.3%
1931	5,580	+20.2%
1936	5,993	+7.4%
1951	6,584	+9.9%
1961	6,302	−4.3%

Year	Pop.	±%
1971	6,019	−4.5%
1981	6,057	+0.6%
1991	6,307	+4.1%
2001	6,440	+2.1%

Source: Data from ISTAT
