= Damian Nabot =

Damian Nabot (born Buenos Aires, 1970) is an investigative reporter and non-fiction author. He is currently managing editor of Political News at "La Nación" newspaper.

== Early life ==
He studied Communication Sciences at University of Buenos Aires and Journalism at TEA School.

== Career ==
He started at the Clarin newspaper in 1994 as a freelancer reporter. Clarín is the major newspaper in Argentina, founded by Roberto Noble on August 28, 1945. Nabot joined DyN news agency in 1996. He also teaches Investigative Journalism in the Catholic University of Buenos Aires. In 2008, Nabot and his colleague David Cox interviewed Licio Gelli, Grand Master of the Lodge Propaganda Due. This documentary, called "The Grand Puppetmaster", was broadcast by Channel 13 of Argentina. Channel 13, also known as El Trece, is an Argentine television network and the flagship station of the same network, located in the capital of Argentina, Buenos Aires. Nabot and Cox have also investigated the robbery of the hands of Perón and revealed a plot behind the theft. Then he worked at the newspaper "Perfil"

== Articles ==
His articles appeared in magazines like Planeta Urbano, Newsweek., La Maga y Página/30. He has worked also for Argentina's most important newspapers like Clarin, La Nación, Perfil y Página/12.

== Books ==
- Unveiling the Enigma. Paperback: 306 pages. Publisher: Zumaya Enigma (June 29, 2009) Language: English. ISBN 1-934841-14-5. ISBN 978-1-934841-14-3.
- El siglo pasado. Paperback: 286 pages. Publisher: Planeta (September 1999). Language: Spanish ISBN 950-49-0211-1. ISBN 978-950-49-0211-9.
