= The Bankers of God: The Calvi Affair =

- Directed by: Giuseppe Ferrara
- Starring: Omero Antonutti; Giancarlo Giannini; Alessandro Gassman; Rutger Hauer
- Cinematography: Federico Del Zoppo
- Edited by: Adriano Tagliavia
- Music by: Pino Donaggio
- Production companies: Sistina Cinematografica; Metropolis Film; Rai Cinema
- Distributed by: Columbia TriStar Films Italia
- Release date: 8 March 2002
- Country: Italy
- Language: Italian

The Bankers of God: The Calvi Affair (Italian: I banchieri di Dio also known as The God's Bankers) is an Italian drama film directed in 2002 by Giuseppe Ferrara.

== Plot ==
The film tells the story of the scandal of Banco Ambrosiano, mainly related to the figure of Roberto Calvi. The Clearstream scandal exploded as a case full of intricate affairs involving the financial world, the Vatican, the Masonic Lodge P2, the Italian Secret Service, the Secret Intelligence Service, the Italian politics, the Mafia and the Banda della Magliana.

The movie narrates in detail all these connections, trying to reconstruct events and plots. The film ends with the death of Calvi under the Blackfriars Bridge, in London, openly supporting the murder-hypothesis.

== Cast ==
- Omero Antonutti as Roberto Calvi
- Giancarlo Giannini as Flavio Carboni
- Alessandro Gassman as Francesco Pazienza
- Rutger Hauer as Bishop Paul Marcinkus
- Pamela Villoresi as Clara Calvi
- Vincenzo Peluso as Silvano Vittor
- Pier Paolo Capponi as Roberto Rosone
- Franco Diogene as Luigi Mennini
- Camillo Milli as Licio Gelli
- Franco Olivero as Michele Sindona

== Production ==
The film had a very long and troubled development. According to the director Giuseppe Ferrara, he started the project in 1986, soon after The Moro Affair, and wanted Gian Maria Volonté in the main role of Roberto Calvi. After a final rejection of the project in 1991 by producers Silvio Berlusconi and Vittorio Cecchi Gori, and with Ferrara's intention of throwing in the towel, the interest of Rai Cinema finally made the project possible 15 years later, in 2001.

The same year, the Italian book of the same name by Mario Almerighi was published.

== See also ==
- Banco Ambrosiano
- Roberto Calvi
