= Federico Umberto D'Amato =

Italian secret agent

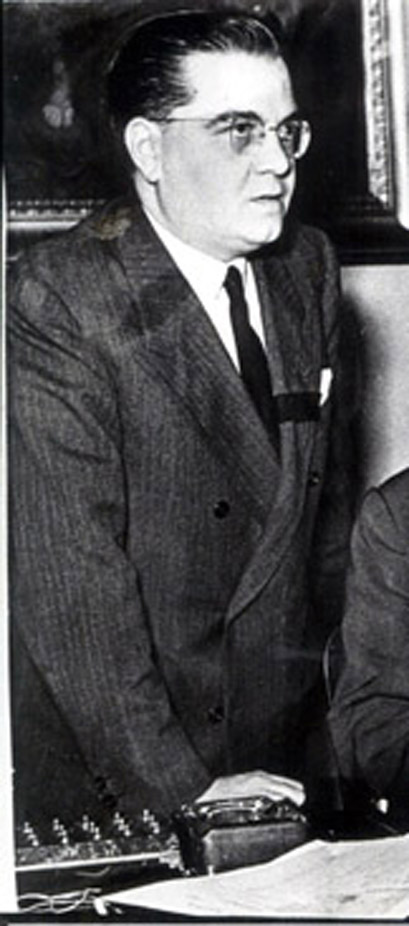
Federico Umberto D'Amato in the 1960s

Federico Umberto D'Amato (4 June 1919 – 1 August 1996) was an Italian secret agent, who led the Office for Reserved Affairs of the Ministry of Interior (Italy) from the 1950s till the 1970s, when the activity of the intelligence service was undercover and not publicly known.

== Biography ==
D'Amato was born in Marseille, and during World War II he worked for the Office of Strategic Services. After the end of the conflict, he was at the head of the North Atlantic Treaty Special Office, a link between NATO and the United States.

At the end of World War II, US intelligence recruited large numbers of officials from the Republic of Salò and the Italian Special Forces, Decima MAS, with the help of D'Amato, to operate in the newly founded Italian state. This recruitment program included prominent figures such as Prince Valerio Borghese, Pino Rauti and Licio Gelli, who are believed to have played a major role in the terrorist attacks in Cold War Italy. D'Amato's later contact with the CIA was James Jesus Angleton. He entered the Office for Reserved Affairs of the Italian Ministry of the Interior in 1957. In 1974, two days after the Piazza della Loggia bombing, he was removed from the position and assigned to the boundary police, although he kept a strong influence on the office until the 1980s. For his activity as the office's director (1969–1974) he has been accused of sidetracking numerous investigations about the massacres that occurred in that period.

D'Amato was a member of Propaganda 2 (P2), a secret masonic lodge involved in numerous political and economic scandals in the 1970s. An expert of gastronomy, he held a column in the weekly L'espresso, under the pseudonym of Federico Godio.

He appeared in a BBC documentary about Operation Gladio in June 1992.

== See also ==
- Kidnapping of Aldo Moro
- Strategy of tension
