= Rebirth of Christian Democracy =

Italian political party (2000-2012)

Rebirth of Christian Democracy Rinascita della Democrazia Cristiana
- Founded: 2000
- Dissolved: 2012
- Merged into: Christian Democracy
- Ideology: Christian democracy
- Political position: Centre

Rebirth of Christian Democracy (Rinascita della Democrazia Cristiana; RDC) was a small Christian-democratic political party in Italy.

== History ==
On 6 December 1997 a new Christian Democracy was founded by Flaminio Piccoli, a former heavyweight of the defunct DC. In 2000, on the occasion of the regional elections, the Christian Democracy presented itself under the name of the Christian Democratic Party, to circumvent the ban on presenting itself with the historical name of the DC.

With the death of the founder Piccoli in April 2000, the party split into two parts. On one side, Carlo Senaldi took over the leadership of Rebirth of Christian Democracy, that on the occasion of the 2001 general elections sided with Sergio D'Antoni and his party European Democracy. The national (organizational) secretary Angelo Sandri was a candidate in a constituency of the Chamber in Friuli-Venezia Giulia, where the movement was also presented in the provincial elections of that same year. On other side, Alfredo Vito, continued to use the name and symbol of the Christian Democratic Party and chose a close collaboration with the center-right coalition (with which it is allied to the 2001 general elections) until it merged with Forza Italia.

In 2002 the party, then led by secretary Angelo Sandri and president Senaldi, joined the reconstituted Christian Democracy, but sometime later it regained its autonomy, under the leadership of Senaldi. In 2005 RDC joined the Christian Democracy for the Autonomies.

In 2012 the party joined the Christian Democracy led by Angelo Sandri, and Senaldi was appointed president of the party.
