= Dina Orsi =

Italian philanthropist and politician

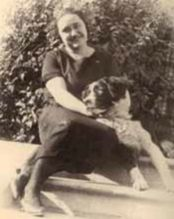
- Born: 2 March 1907; Conegliano, Italy
- Died: 13 March 1967 (aged 60); Conegliano, Italy
- Occupations: Philanthropist, politician
- Known for: Advocacy for child welfare and inclusion of children with disabilities

Dina Orsi (Conegliano, 2 March 1907 – Conegliano, 13 March 1967) was an Italian philanthropist and politician. She was a driving force behind the establishment of a specialized center for the care of abandoned and disabled children, with the goal of promoting their social inclusion.

== Biography ==
Dina Orsi was born in Conegliano to Camilla Concini and Guido Orsi, the town's mayor. She was the niece of Domenico Concini, a member of the Italian Parliament during several legislatures of the Kingdom of Italy. She studied piano under Erminia Carpenè Foltran and was known from an early age for her sensitivity, generosity, and strong determination. She volunteered in summer camps for the children of drafted soldiers. In 1936, she served as a Red Cross nurse in Asmara, East Africa, during the Second Italo-Ethiopian War. This experience was documented in letters to her friend Elena Roma. Her spiritual development is reflected in her correspondence with three religious mentors: Sister Maria Biraschi, Father Ciccarelli and Mother Celina Maria. She became a Third Order Franciscan and later joined the Secular Institute of the Missionaries of the Kingship of Christ. She also served as provincial president of the Italian Red Cross.

Orsi focused on the study of issues related to abandoned and disabled children, identifying a frequent connection between the two conditions. A high percentage of children institutionalized in medical-educational facilities came from foundling homes. These findings led her to advocate for a new kind of institution, with updated educational and rehabilitative methods, aimed at the social inclusion of children with disabilities.

== Political career ==
Orsi entered politics in 1953, serving until 1960 as Councilor for Social Welfare, Deputy Mayor, and Head of Public Education in the Municipality of Conegliano. From 1960 until her death in 1967, she held the position of Provincial Councilor for Social Welfare in the Province of Treviso. Affiliated with the Christian Democracy (Italy) party, she worked closely with national parliamentarians, including the young Tina Anselmi, who later became Italy’s first female Minister of Labor and Social Security.

Among her key initiatives, Orsi led the modernization of the provincial foundling home and championed the establishment of a branch of La Nostra Famiglia, the association founded by Don Luigi Monza, in the province of Treviso. She convinced La Nostra Famiglia’s general director Zaira Spreafico and the Conegliano City Council to donate a 30,000-square-meter site on Costa Alta hill. The council resolution was unanimously approved on 25 November 1963. The groundbreaking ceremony took place on 8 October 1966. The Conegliano center was the first of eight such centers later built in Veneto. Today, it is an IRCCS (Scientific Institute for Research, Hospitalization and Healthcare), engaged in international clinical research and university-level rehabilitation education.

She died suddenly on 13 March 1967.

== Other initiatives ==
Dina Orsi promoted the creation of the Oasi Santa Chiara retreat and training center, inaugurated in Conegliano in 1964, and the cultural initiative center Studium Coneglianese. She also worked to establish the city library, donating both the building and her family’s book collection.

== Legacy ==
In 1995, the municipal auditorium and public theater in Parè di Conegliano was named in her honor. A street in San Vendemiano is also named after her.

The Dina Orsi Foundation is the publisher of L’Azione, a weekly newspaper based in Vittorio Veneto.

In 2025, the theatrical performance "Tutto o Niente! Le vite di Dina Orsi", written and directed by Caterina Riccomini with theatrical adaptation by Gianluca Paradiso, was staged in her memory.

== Bibliography ==
- Dall'Anese, Silvia (2003). Dina Orsi. Donna di grandi ideali. Dario De Bastiani Editore.
- Mazzarolli, Antonio. In ricordo di Dina Orsi : Conegliano 7 maggio 1987. Biblioteca della Fondazione Francesco Fabbri in Pieve di Soligo (TV).
- "Dina Orsi, una vita di impegno sociale", 9 febbraio 2003. Articolo che presenta il libro di Dall'Anese e offre una panoramica sulla vita e l'impegno di Dina Orsi" (PDF). La Tribuna di Treviso.
- "Riconoscimento della personalità giuridica della Fondazione "Dina Orsi - Oasi S. Chiara", con sede in Conegliano". Gazzetta Ufficiale della Repubblica Italiana, Decreto del Presidente della Repubblica 3 dicembre 1970, n. 1290.
