= Gérard Soisson =

Gérard Soisson (1935–1983) was a Luxembourgish banker who was at the center of the scandals around Cedel (later Clearstream Banking SA).

Cedel was a clearing house for major European banks and corporations. Soisson was the firm's general manager. Soisson initiated a ssystem of non-published accounts. The accounts were invisible to the bank's overall books and only known to a small group of insiders. It would later be alleged that these accounts enabled money laundering at a vast scale.

In 1982 Banco Ambrosiano, controlled by the Vatican's Institute for the Works of Religion and one of Clearstream's partner institutions collapsed.

Before the collapse became a scandal Soisson died at age 43 of a reported heart attack while on holiday in Corsica. Since then journalists such as Lucy Komisar and Denis Robert have viewed his death as suspicious. Connected with the suspicious death of Banco Ambrosiano chairman Roberto Calvi.

After Soisson's death the unpublished account system continued. Eventually exploding into the Clearstream Affair that would see the arrest of French president Nicolas Sarkozy.
