= Umberto Ortolani =

Italian entrepreneur

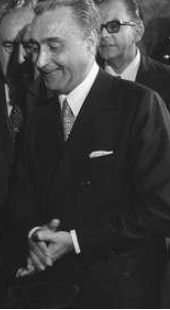
Umberto Ortolani in 1971

Umberto Ortolani (31 May 1913 – 17 January 2002) was an Italian businessman, banker, farm landowner and media mogul with business interests in Italy and South America. Freemason, a friend of the Cardinal Giacomo Lercaro, since 1963 he was a Papal gentleman and in 1969, he became Ambassador of the Knights Hospitalier Order of Malta in Montevideo.

He is known for his involvement in the masonic P2 lodge and was involved with Licio Gelli's business interests in South America and with the Vatican, through the Institute for the Works of Religion (IOR) of Msgr. Paul Marcinkus.

== Biography ==
Born in Rome, Ortolani studied law and after the Second World War became CEO of Ducati. He was introduced by Cardinal Giacomo Lercaro of Bologna into Vatican circles. Ortolani built on ecclesiastical friendships and on relations with the world of politics and industry, a solid launching pad, preferring, however, to remain out of the public eye (he gained the nickname "Mr. Nobody" for his discretion).

While he was a Freemason, as part of his business interests, he had holdings in the Italia media. He had been president of the Italia news agency, sold to Eni in 1965. Ortolani was also President of the National Institute of State Employees (INCIS), president of the Ente Terme and president of the World Federation of Italian Press Abroad. During the early 1970s, Ortolani built up relations with Licio Gelli; he was registered with the Propaganda Due masonic lodge in 1974.

While Ortolani did have business interests in Italy, his most significant holdings were abroad, in South America. At the time of his arrest by the Guardia di Finanza in September 1983, he administered a bank (the "Bafisud", Banco Financiero Sudamericano), owned thirty large farms in Uruguay, as well as a publishing house, three skyscrapers and thousands of cultivated hectares cultivated in Argentina, Paraguay and Brazil. As the controversy surrounding the P2 lodge was coming to light, Ortolani was accused of being involved in its financial intrigues (from the "Rizzoli case" to the fall of Banco Ambrosiano). He became a fugitive, the subject of two international arrest warrants.

He was also accused, then acquitted, of involvement in the Bologna massacre. Ortolani had been a Brazilian citizen since 1978 and thus, when he fled to São Paulo, the Brazilian government refused to either arrest him or deport him to Italy for trial. On 21 June 1989, Ortolani decided to return to Italy and was arrested by the Guardia di Finanza at the Malpensa Airport. After being locked up in a Milanese prison, he paid a 600 million lire bail fee and after a week was released. On 28 January 1994, Ortolani was sentenced to four years imprisonment for bankruptcy in the context of the management of Rizzoli, of which he had been a director.

In 1996, in the trial against the P2 lodge, he was acquitted of the charge of political conspiracy against the powers of the state. In April 1998, the Court of Cassation confirmed and made definitive the 12-year sentence for his involvement in the Banco Ambrosiano affair. Ortolani, who lived in Rome, did not return to prison, because of his poor health. The Surveillance Court of Rome, in fact, suspended the execution of the sentence because of his illness. He died in Rome on 17 January 2002.

In 1963, Pope Paul VI granted him the title of Papal chamberlain, but this title was revoked in 1983 by Pope John Paul II.
