= Licio Gelli =

Italian financier and Master of Propaganda Due (1919–2015)

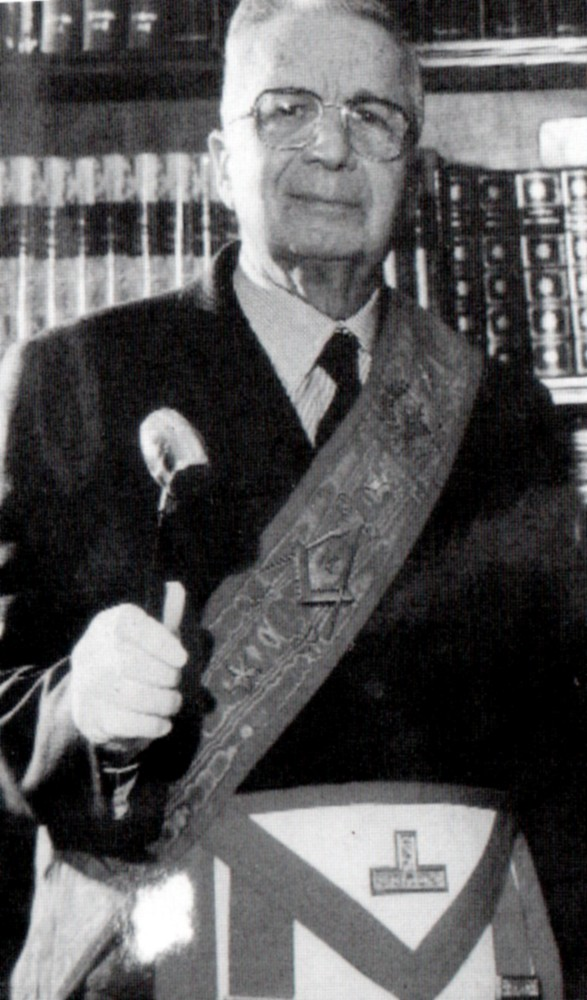
- Born: 21 April 1919; Pistoia, Tuscany, Kingdom of Italy
- Died: 15 December 2015 (aged 96); Arezzo, Tuscany, Italy
- Occupation: Businessman
- Organization: Propaganda Due (until 1982)
- Height: 1.80 m (5 ft 11 in)
- Political party: National Fascist Party (1939–1943); Republican Fascist Party (1943–1945)
- Spouses: Wanda Vannacci (m. 1944; died 1993) Gabriela Vasile (m. 2006)
- Children: Raffaello (b. 1947); Maria Rosa (b. 1956); Maurizio (b. 1959)

Licio Gelli (Italian: [ˈliːtʃo ˈdʒɛlli]; 21 April 1919 – 15 December 2015) was an Italian Freemason, businessman, and terrorist. A fascist volunteer in his youth, he is chiefly known for his role in the Banco Ambrosiano scandal and in the Bologna massacre. He was revealed in 1981 as being the Venerable Master of the clandestine Masonic lodge Propaganda Due (P2). This would lead to him getting arrested in Switzerland in 1982. He managed to escape from prison the next year, but eventually agreed to surrender back into the custody of Swiss authorities for a short period of time in 1987. From 1996 until his death in 2015, Gelli remained mostly under house arrest at his home in Arezzo.

== Early life ==
Gelli was born in Pistoia in Tuscany. During the 1930s, Gelli, then a seventeen-year-old student at a liceo classico in Pistoia, was expelled from all schools in Italy after slapping a teacher. He subsequently left as a volunteer to fight in Spain with the Fascist brigades supporting Generalissimo Francisco Franco. It was in the battle of Malaga that his brother Raffaello died. The youngest recruit in his contingent, he was decorated by Franco himself.

Gelli also volunteered for the Blackshirts expeditionary forces sent by Mussolini in support of Francisco Franco's rebellion in the Spanish Civil War. He served as liaison officer between the Italian government and Nazi Germany, and participated in the Italian Social Republic with Giorgio Almirante, founder of the neofascist Italian Social Movement (MSI).

After a sales job with the Italian mattress factory Permaflex, Gelli founded his own textile and importing company.

== Involvement in failed coup and fugitive years in Argentina ==
In 1970, in the plans of the failed Golpe Borghese, Gelli was tasked with arresting the Italian President, Giuseppe Saragat. As Master of the Propaganda Due (P2) lodge, Gelli had ties with very high level personalities in Italy and abroad, in particular in Argentina, where he was a fugitive for many years. The regular Masonic lodge was enjoyed by Guillermo Suárez Mason and José López Rega, two key-exponents of the Argentine military junta.

The Argentine Chancellor Alberto Vignes drafted with Juan Perón, who had returned from exile in 1973, a decree granting Gelli the Gran Cruz de la Orden del Libertador in August 1974, as well as the honorary office of economic counselor in the embassy of Argentina in Italy. Gelli publicly declared on repeated occasions that he was a close friend of Perón, although no confirmation ever came from South America. Gelli affirmed that he introduced Peron to Masonry and that this friendship was of real importance for Italy. He stated: "Peron was a Mason, I initiated him in Madrid in Puerta de Hierro, in June 1973." Gelli become the main economic and financial consultant of Isabel Perón and of José López Rega.

According to a letter sent by Gelli to César de la Vega, a P2 member and Argentine ambassador to the UNESCO, Gelli commissioned P2 member Federico Carlos Barttfeld to be transferred from the consulate of Hamburg to the Argentine embassy in Rome. Gelli was also named minister plenipotentiary for cultural affairs in the Argentine embassy in Italy, thus providing him with diplomatic immunity. He had four diplomatic passports issued by Argentina, and has been charged in Argentina with falsification of official documents. During the 1970s, Gelli brokered three-way oil and arms deals between Libya, Italy and Argentina through the Agency for Economic Development, which he and Umberto Ortolani owned.

Several members of the Argentine military junta have been found to be P2 members, such as Raúl Alberto Lastiri, Argentina's interim president from 13 July 1973 until 12 October 1973, Emilio Massera, part of Jorge Videla's military junta from 1976 to 1978, and José López Rega, the infamous founder of the Argentine Anticommunist Alliance ("Triple A"). The lodge P2, also known as the Propaganda Due, was also linked to the robbery of Juan Perón's severed hands.

=== Alleged involvement in CIA activities in Italy ===
In 1981, Gelli was one of the very few Italians to be invited to President Reagan's inauguration.

In 1990, a report on RAI Television alleged that the CIA had paid Gelli to instigate terrorist activities in Italy. Following this report, which also claimed that the CIA had been involved in the assassination of the Swedish Prime minister Olof Palme, then President Francesco Cossiga requested the opening of investigations while the CIA itself officially denied these allegations. Critics have claimed the RAI report to be a fraud because of the inclusion of testimony from Richard Brenneke, who claimed to be a former CIA agent and made several declarations concerning the October surprise conspiracy. Brenneke's background was also investigated by a U.S. Senate subcommittee, which dismissed Brenneke's claims of CIA employment. In June 2020, the Swedish police closed their investigation into Olof Palme's assassination, assigning blame to Stig Engström, a Swedish graphic designer and centre-right municipal activist who was not affiliated with the CIA.

== 1981 raid and the P2 list ==
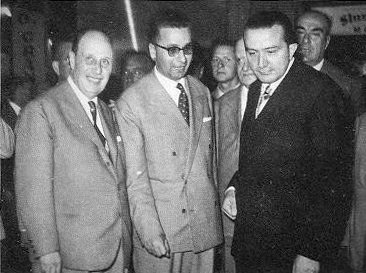
Giulio Andreotti (right) with Licio Gelli (center)

Gelli's downfall started with the Banco Ambrosiano scandal, which led to a 1981 police raid on his villa and the discovery of the P2 covert lodge. On 17 March 1981 a police raid on his villa in Arezzo led to the discovery of a list of 962 persons composed of Italian military officers and civil servants, including the heads of the three Italian secret services, involved in Propaganda Due (also known as "P2"), a clandestine lodge expelled from the Grande Oriente d'Italia Masonic organization. Future Italian prime minister Silvio Berlusconi was on the list, although he had not yet entered politics. He was then known as the founder and owner of "Canale 5" TV channel, and was listed as a member of P2.

A Parliamentary Commission, directed by Tina Anselmi (of the Christian Democratic party), found no evidence of crimes, but in 1981 the Italian parliament passed a law banning secret associations in Italy. Gelli was expelled from GOI freemasonry on 31 October 1981, and the P2 scandal provoked the fall of Arnaldo Forlani's cabinet in June 1981

The P2 lodge had some form of power in Italy, given the public prominence of its members, and many observers still consider it to be extremely strong. Several famous people in Italy today (starting with the top TV anchor-man Maurizio Costanzo) were affiliated with P2. Among these Michele Sindona, a banker with clear connections to the Mafia, has been clearly associated with P2. In 1972, Sindona purchased a controlling interest in Long Island's Franklin National Bank. Two years later, the bank collapsed. Convicted in 1980 in the US, "mysterious Michele" was extradited to Italy. Two years later, he was poisoned in his cell while serving a life sentence. The P2 membership list was authenticated, with a few exceptions, by a 1984 parliamentary report.

=== Imprisonment in Switzerland, escape, and return to Switzerland ===
On the run, Gelli escaped to Switzerland where he was arrested on 13 September 1982 while trying to withdraw tens of millions of dollars in Geneva. Detained in the modern Champ-Dollon Prison near Geneva, he managed to escape on August 10, 1983 and then fled to South America for four years. In 1984 Jorge Vargas, the secretary general of the Unión Nacionalista de Chile (UNACH, Nationalist Union of Chile, a short-lived National Socialist party) and a former member of the Movimiento Revolucionario Nacional Sindicalista (National-Syndicalist Revolutionary Movement), declared to La Tercera de la Hora that Gelli was then in Pinochet's Chile.

Finally, in 1987, Gelli secretly came back to Switzerland in the car of his lawyer Marc Bonnant and surrendered in Geneva to investigative judge Jean-Pierre Trembley. He was wanted in connection with the 1982 collapse of the Banco Ambrosiano and on charges of subversive association in connection with the 1980 Bologna railway station bombing, which killed 85 people. He was sentenced to two months in prison in Switzerland, while an Italian court in Florence sentenced him on 15 December 1987, in absentia, to eight years in prison on charges of financing right-wing terrorist activity in Tuscany in the 1970s. Gelli had already been sentenced in absentia to 14 months in jail by a court in San Remo for illegally exporting money from Italy.

== Extradition to Italy, trials and house arrest ==
Switzerland eventually agreed to extradite him to Italy, but only on financial charges stemming from the collapse of Banco Ambrosiano. Gelli's extradition in February 1988 required a high-level security apparatus, including 100 sharpshooters, decoy cars, a train, road blocks and two armored cars to transfer him to Italy. In July 1988 he was absolved of charges of subversive association by a Bologna court but was presented with a five-year prison term for slander, having side-tracked the investigation into the 1980 bombing of the Bologna train station. Stipulations connected to his extradition, however, prevented him from serving time. Two years later, an appeal court threw out Gelli's slander conviction. A retrial was ordered in October 1993.

In 1992 Gelli was sentenced to 18 years and six months of prison after being found guilty of fraud concerning the collapse of Banco Ambrosiano in 1982 (a "black hole" of $1.4 billion was found). The Vatican bank, Istituto per le Opere di Religione, main share-holder of the Banco Ambrosiano, consequently had a "black hole" of $250 million. This sentence was reduced by the Court of Appeal to 12 years. The year 1992 also saw the beginning of the trial of 16 members of the P2 Masonic Lodge, which included charges of conspiracy against the state, espionage, and the revelation of state secrets. In April 1994 Gelli received a 17-year sentence for divulging state secrets and slandering the investigation, while the court threw out the charge that P2 members conspired against the state; Gelli's sentence was reduced, and he was placed under house arrest two years later.

In April 1998 the Court of Cassation confirmed a 12-year sentence for the Ambrosiano crash. Gelli then disappeared on the eve of being imprisoned, in May 1998, while being under house arrest in his mansion near Arezzo. His disappearance was strongly suspected to be the result of being forewarned. Then, finally, he was arrested in September 1998 the French Riviera in Cannes. Two motions of no confidence were made by the right-wing opposition (the Northern League and the ex-Christian Democratic splinter groups CDU-CDR), against the Justice Minister, Giovanni Maria Flick, and the Interior Minister, Giorgio Napolitano, stating that Gelli had benefited from accomplices helping him in his escape. They also made reference to secret negotiations which would have allowed him to reappear without going to prison. But the two ministers won the confidence vote. Police found $2M worth of gold ingots in Gelli's villa.

A few years after the Ambrosiano scandal, many suspects pointed toward Gelli with reference to his possible involvement in the murder of the Milanese banker Roberto Calvi, also known as "God's banker", who had been jailed in the wake of the collapse of Banco Ambrosiano. On 19 July 2005 Gelli was formally indicted by Roman Magistrates for the murder of Roberto Calvi, along with former Mafia boss Giuseppe Calò (also known as "Pippo Calò"), businessmen Ernesto Diotallevi and Flavio Carboni, and the latter's girlfriend, Manuela Kleinszig. In his statement before the court Gelli blamed people connected with Calvi's work in financing the Polish Solidarity movement, allegedly on behalf of the Vatican. He was accused of having provoked Calvi's death in order to punish him for having embezzled money owed to him and the Mafia. The Mafia also wanted to prevent Calvi from revealing how the bank had been used for money laundering. Gelli's name, however, was not in the final indictment at the trial that started in October 2005, and the other accused were eventually acquitted due to "insufficient evidence", though by the time of these acquittals in June 2007, the prosecutor's office in Rome had opened a second investigation implicating Gelli, among others. In May 2009, the case against Gelli was dropped. According to the magistrate there was insufficient evidence to argue that Gelli had played a role in the planning and execution of the crime. Gelli has been implicated in Aldo Moro's murder, since the Italian chief of intelligence, accused of negligence, was a piduista (P2 member).

After being captured in September 1998, Gelli would continue to remain under house arrest until his death in December 2015.

== Later years ==
In 1996, Gelli was nominated as a candidate for the Nobel Prize in Literature, supported by Mother Teresa and Naguib Mahfouz. The same year, however, Gelli was placed under house arrest at his Villa Wanda home in Arezzo. Aside from a four month escape period, which occurred from May to September 1998, Gelli would continue to remain under house arrest at Villa Wanda for the remainder of the life. In 2003 Gelli told La Repubblica that it seemed that the P2 "democratic rebirth plan" was being implemented by Silvio Berlusconi:

Every morning I speak to my conscience and the dialogue calms me down. I look at the country, read the newspaper, and think: "All is becoming a reality little by little, piece by piece. To be truthful, I should have had the copyright to it. Justice, TV, public order. I wrote about this thirty years ago ... Berlusconi is an extraordinary man, a man of action. This is what Italy needs: not a man of words, but a man of action.

He talked of many Italian politicians. Of Fabrizio Cicchitto, he said he knew him well (è bravo, preparato — "he's good and capable"). With regard to Berlusconi's program for the reform of the judicial system, he boasted that this had been an integral part of his original project. He also approved of Berlusconi's reorganization of television networks.

On 15 December 2015 Gelli died in Arezzo, Tuscany, aged 96. The funeral home was set up in Villa Wanda. The funeral Mass was celebrated on December 17 in the Church of Mercy of Pistoia, his native town, in the presence of relatives and onlookers and relatively few VIPs. During the funeral, access to the church was prevented by a private security agency. The body was transferred to the family chapel of the Cemetery of Mercy in Pistoia, where his first wife Wanda already rested.

After his death, an autographed will was published in which he named as his only "spiritual heir" the Romanian general Bartolomeu Constantin Săvoiu, Grand Master of the Romanian National Lodge.

== Personal archive ==
On 11 February 2006, Licio Gelli donated his "non-secret archive" to the State Archives of Pistoia, as part of an official ceremony, held under the patronage of the Municipality. However, the municipal administrators of Pistoia preferred not to take part in the ceremony.

However, the so-called "500 directory" remained secret (426 files addressed by Gelli to businessmen, politicians, companies, banks, clergymen, etc.). Guardia di Finanza and investigators have never managed to find its contents.

== See also ==
- Dirty War
- Hands of Perón
- Years of Lead (Italy)

== Sources ==
- Ginsborg, Paul (2003). Italy and Its Discontents, London: Palgrave Macmillan ISBN 1-4039-6152-2 (Review Institute of Historical Research | Review New York Times)
