= Christian Democratic Party (Italy) =

Christian Democratic Party Partito Democratico Cristiano
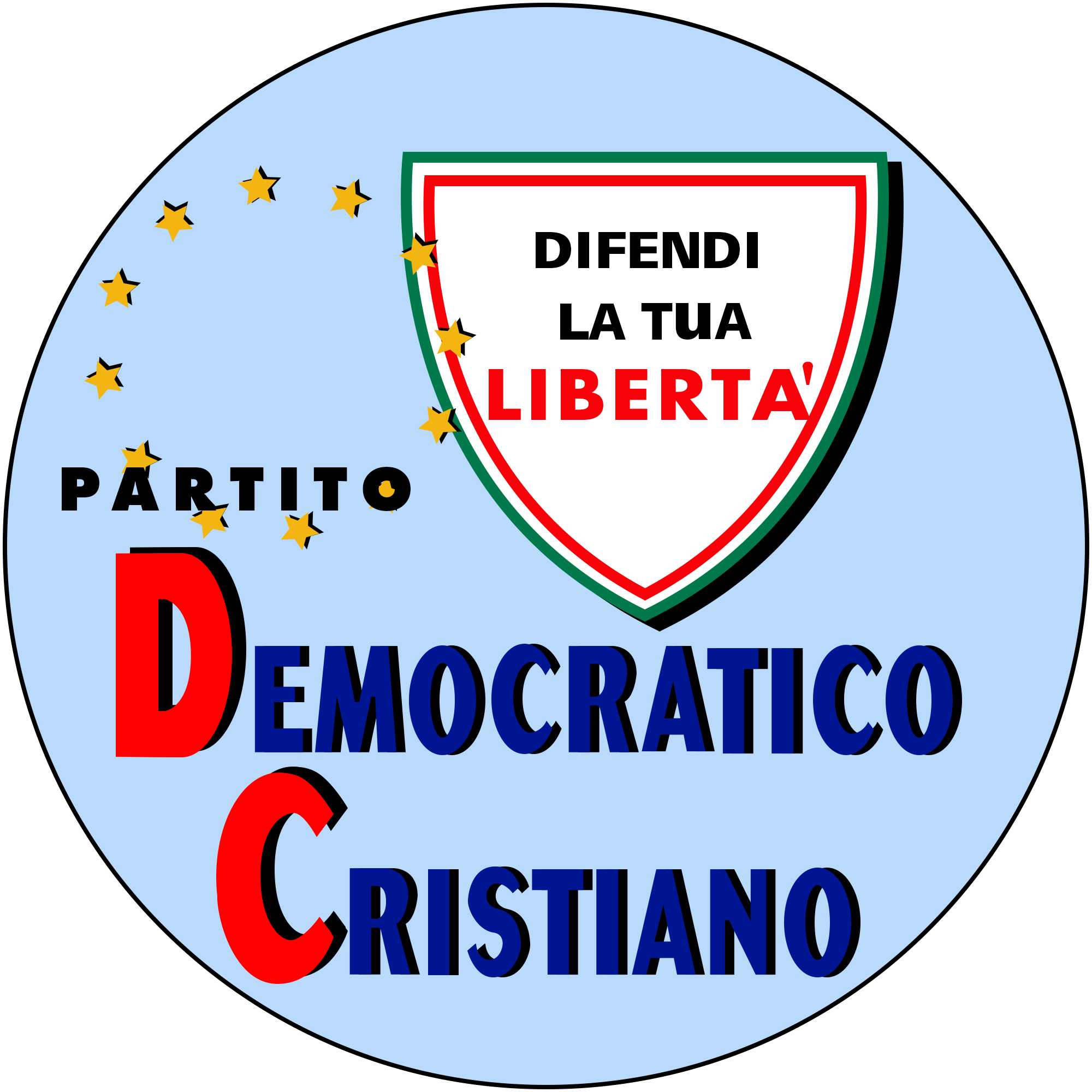
- Founded: 2000
- Dissolved: 2013
- Merged into: Forza Italia
- Headquarters: Piazza del Gesù, 46 - Rome
- Ideology: Christian democracy
- Political position: Centre

Website
- www.partitodemocraticocristiano.org

The Christian Democratic Party (Partito Democratico Cristiano) was a minor Christian-democratic Italian political party.

It was founded in 2000 by Flaminio Piccoli, Clelio Darida, Carlo Senaldi and Alfredo Vito as the electoral arm of the new Christian Democracy. Alfredo Vito, who took the party leadership in July of that year, led the group out from the party and was elected to the Chamber of Deputies for Forza Italia in the 2001 general election.

In 2002 the party was almost merged with Forza Italia, but regained its autonomy in 2003, under the leadership of Gianni Prandini, who is the current secretary of the party. In the 2008 general election the party was part of the Union of the Centre, led by Pier Ferdinando Casini.

In 2013 the party was merged into the new Forza Italia.

== Leadership ==
- Secretary: Flaminio Piccoli (2000), Carlo Senaldi (2000), Alfredo Vito (2000–2003), Gianni Prandini (2003–2013)
- President: Clelio Darida (2000–2003), Anna Nenna D'Antonio (2003–2007), Gian Aldo Arnaud (2007–2013)
