= Gustavo Selva =

Italian journalist, writer and politician (1926–2015)

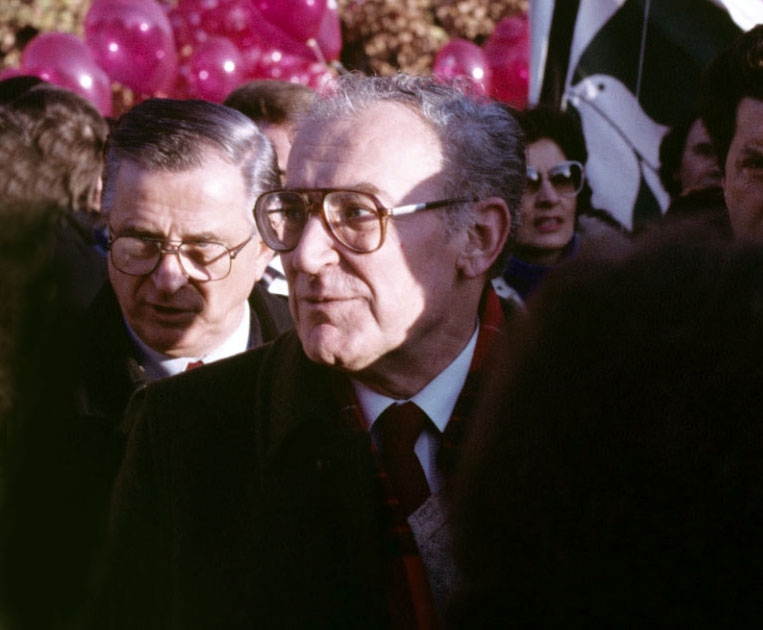
- Selva at the March for the Peace, Rome, 1985

Member of the Chamber of Deputies
- In office 15 April 1994 – 28 April 2006

Member of the Senate
- In office 28 April 2006 – 28 April 2008

Personal details
- Born: 10 August 1926; Imola, Italy
- Died: 16 March 2015 (aged 88); Terni, Italy
- Political party: National Alliance
- Profession: Journalist, Politician

Gustavo Selva (10 August 1926 – 16 March 2015) was an Italian journalist, writer and politician.

Born in Imola, Selva started his career as a journalist for the Bologna newspaper L'Avvenire d'Italia, for which he worked from 1946 to 1956. In 1960 he became a RAI employee, working as a newscaster and later being appointed director of the Radio 2 news programs and president of "RAI Corporation" in New York.

Selva started his political activity in 1984, as a Member of the European Parliament for the Christian Democratic party. He was a member of the Propaganda Due. He later adhered to the National Alliance party, with whom he was a deputy for three legislatures and senator for one legislature.
