= Roberto Calvi =

Italian banker (1920–1982)

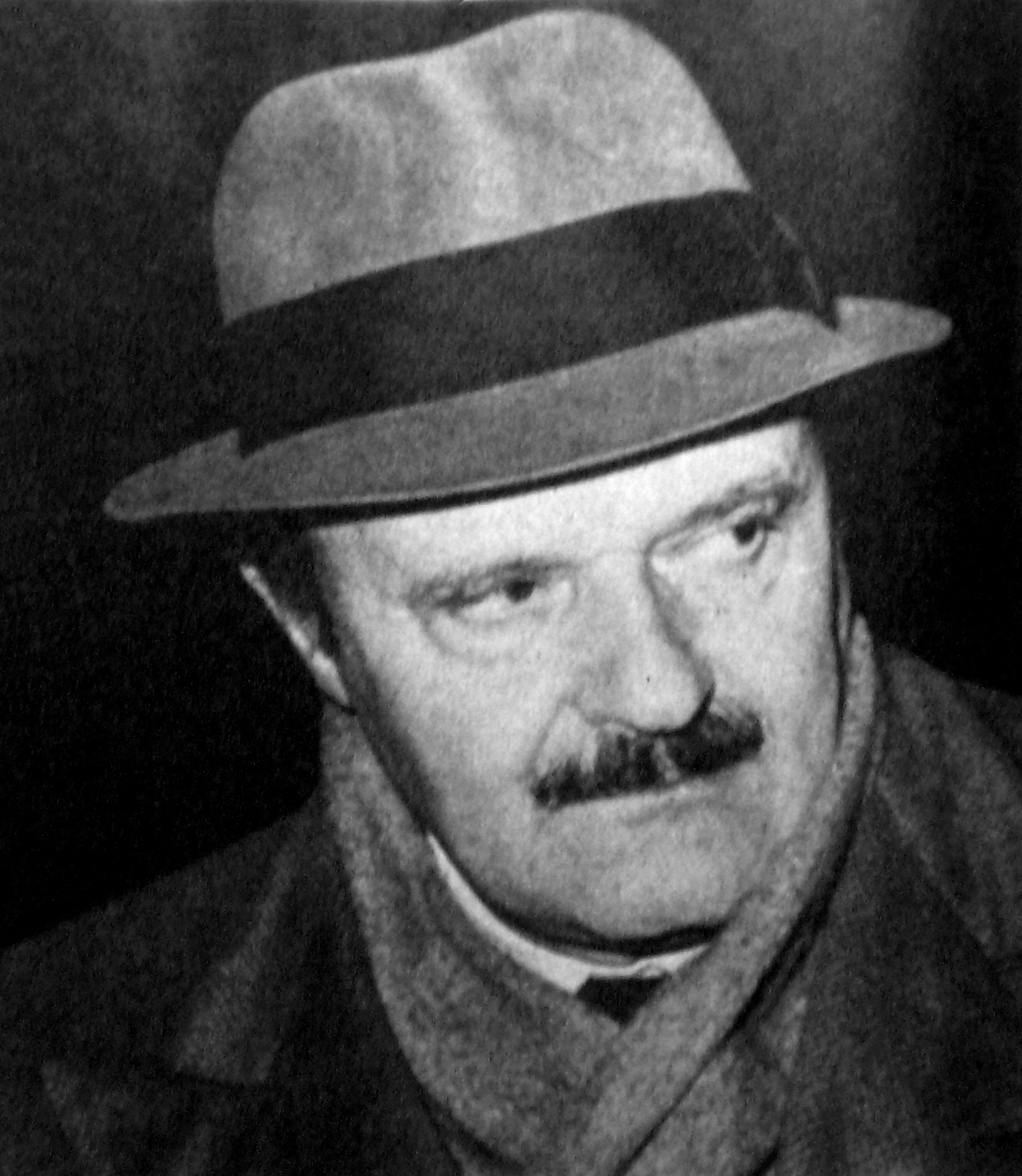
- Born: 13 April 1920; Milan, Lombardy, Kingdom of Italy
- Died: 17 June 1982 (aged 62); London, England
- Other name: Banchiere di Dio ("God's Banker")
- Occupation: Banker

Roberto Calvi (13 April 1920 – 17 June 1982) was an Italian banker, dubbed "God's Banker" (Italian: Banchiere di Dio) by the press because of his close business dealings with the Holy See. He was a native of Milan and was chairman of Banco Ambrosiano, which collapsed in one of Italy's biggest political scandals.

Calvi's death by hanging in London in June 1982 is a source of enduring controversy and was ruled a murder after two coroners' inquests and an independent investigation. Five people were acquitted in Rome in June 2007 of conspiracy to murder Roberto Calvi. Popular suspicion has linked his death to allegedly corrupt officials of the Vatican Bank, the Sicilian Mafia, and the Continental Freemasonry lodge Propaganda Due.

== Life and career ==
Roberto Calvi's father was the manager of the Banca Commerciale Italiana (Italian Commercial Bank). Calvi joined the bank after World War II, but he moved to Banco Ambrosiano, then Italy's second-largest bank, in 1947. He married in 1952 and had two children. Soon he became the personal assistant of Carlo Alessandro Canesi, a leading figure and later president of Banco Ambrosiano. Calvi became general manager in the first half of the 1970s and was chairman from 1975 until his death in 1982.

== Banco Ambrosiano scandal ==
In 1978, the Bank of Italy produced a report on Banco Ambrosiano which found that several billion lire had been exported illegally, leading to criminal investigations. Calvi was tried in 1981, given a four-year suspended sentence, and fined US$19.8 million for transferring US$27 million out of the country in violation of Italian currency laws. He was released on bail pending appeal and kept his position at the bank. During his short spell in jail, Calvi attempted suicide. His family maintains that he was manipulated by others and was innocent of the crimes attributed to him.

The controversy surrounding Calvi's dealings at Banco Ambrosiano echoed a scandal in 1974 when the Holy See lost an estimated US$30 million upon the collapse of the Franklin National Bank owned by financier Michele Sindona. Bad loans and foreign currency transactions led to the collapse of the bank. Sindona died in prison after drinking coffee laced with cyanide.

Calvi wrote a letter of warning to Pope John Paul II on 5 June 1982, two weeks before the collapse of Banco Ambrosiano, stating that such an event would "provoke a catastrophe of unimaginable proportions in which the Church will suffer the gravest damage." The correspondence confirmed that illegal transactions were common knowledge among the top affiliates of the bank and the Vatican. Banco Ambrosiano collapsed in June 1982 following the discovery of debts between US$700 million and 1.5 billion. Much of the money had been transferred through the Vatican Bank, which owned shares in Banco Ambrosiano.

In 1984, the Vatican Bank agreed to pay US$224 million to 120 of Banco Ambrosiano's creditors as a "recognition of moral involvement" in the bank's collapse. It has never been confirmed whether the Vatican Bank was directly involved in the scandal due to a lack of evidence in the subpoenaed correspondence, which only revealed that Calvi consistently supported the Vatican's religious agenda. Calvi committed the crime of fiscal misconduct, and there was no evidence of church involvement otherwise, so the Vatican Bank was granted immunity.

== Death ==
Calvi went missing from his Rome apartment on 10 June 1982, having fled the country on a false passport under the name Gian Roberto Calvini, fleeing initially to Venice. From there, he apparently hired a private plane to London via Zürich. A postal clerk was crossing London's Blackfriars Bridge at 7:30 am on Friday, 18 June and noticed Calvi's body hanging from the scaffolding beneath. Calvi carried five bricks in his pockets and possessed approximately US$14,000 in three different currencies.

Calvi was a member of Licio Gelli's illegal masonic lodge Propaganda Due (P2), who referred to themselves as frati neri or "black friars." This led to a suggestion in some quarters that Calvi was murdered as a masonic warning because of the symbolism associated with the word "Blackfriars".

The day before his body was found, Calvi was stripped of his post at Banco Ambrosiano by the Bank of Italy, and his private secretary Graziella Corrocher jumped to her death from a fifth-floor window at the bank's headquarters. Corrocher left behind an angry note condemning the damage that Calvi had done to the bank and its employees. Her death was ruled a suicide, based on the opinion of Sir Keith Simpson.

Calvi's death was the subject of two coroners' inquests in London. The first recorded verdict of suicide was in July 1982. The Calvi family then secured the services of George Carman, QC. The second inquest was held in July 1983, and the jury recorded an open verdict, indicating that the court had been unable to determine the exact cause of death. Calvi's family maintained that his death had been a murder.

In 1991, the Calvi family commissioned the New York-based investigation company Kroll Associates to investigate the circumstances of Calvi's death. The case was assigned to Jeff Katz, who was a senior case manager for the company in London. As part of his two-year investigation, Katz hired a former Home Office forensic scientist, Angela Gallop, to undertake forensic tests. She found that Calvi could not have hanged himself from the scaffolding because the lack of paint and rust on his shoes proved that he had not walked on the scaffolding. In October 1992, the forensic report was submitted to the home secretary and the City of London Police, who dismissed it at the time.

Calvi's body was exhumed in December 1998, and an Italian court commissioned a German forensic scientist to repeat the work produced by Katz and his forensic team. That report was published in October 2002, ten years after the original, and confirmed the first report. In addition, it said that the injuries to Calvi's neck were inconsistent with hanging and that he had not touched the bricks found in his pockets. When his body was found, the River Thames had receded with the tide, but the scaffolding could have been reached by a person standing in a boat at the time of the hanging. That had also been the conclusion of a separate report by Katz in 1992, which also detailed a reconstruction based on Calvi's last known movements in London and theorized that he had been taken by boat from a point of access to the Thames in West London.

This aspect of Calvi's death was the focus of the theory that he was murdered and is the version of events depicted in Giuseppe Ferrara's film reconstruction of the event. In September 2003, the City of London Police re-opened their investigation as a murder inquiry. More evidence arose, revealing that Calvi stayed in a flat in Chelsea Cloisters just prior to his death. Sergio Vaccari was a small-time drug dealer who had stayed in the same flat, and he was found dead in possession of masonic papers displaying member names of P2. The murders of both Calvi and Vaccari involved bricks stuffed in clothing, correlating the two deaths and confirming Calvi's ties to the lodge.

Calvi's life was insured for US$10 million with Unione Italiana. His family's attempts to obtain a payout resulted in litigation (Fisher v Unione Italiana [1998] CLC 682). The forensic report of 2002 established that Calvi had been murdered and the policy was finally settled, although around half of the sum was paid to creditors of the Calvi family who incurred considerable costs during their attempts to establish the cause of his death.

== Prosecution of Giuseppe Calò and Licio Gelli ==
In July 1991, Sicilian Mafia pentito Francesco Marino Mannoia claimed that Roberto Calvi became the victim of a contract killing because he had lost money belonging to senior Mafia bosses when Banco Ambrosiano collapsed.

According to Mannoia, the killer was Francesco Di Carlo, a mafioso living in London at the time, on the orders of Giuseppe Calò and Propaganda Due Worshipful Master Licio Gelli. Di Carlo also became a cooperating witness in June 1996 and denied that he was the killer, but he admitted that Calò had approached him to commit the murder.

According to Di Carlo, the killers were Vaccari and Vincenzo Casillo, who belonged to the Camorra from Naples and both of whom were later murdered. In 1997, Italian prosecutors in Rome implicated Calò in Calvi's murder, along with Flavio Carboni, an allegedly mobbed up Sardinian businessman with wide-ranging interests. Di Carlo and Ernesto Diotallevi, a member of the Banda della Magliana, were also alleged to be involved in the killing. In July 2003, Italian prosecutors concluded that the Sicilian Mafia acted in its own interests and to ensure that Calvi could not blackmail them.

Gelli was the master of the P2 lodge, and he received a notification on 19 July 2005 informing him that he was formally under investigation on charges of ordering Calvi's contract killing, along with Calò, Diotallevi, Flavio Carboni, and Carboni's Austrian girlfriend Manuela Kleinszig. The other four suspects had been indicted on murder charges in April. According to the indictment, the five ordered the murder to prevent Calvi "from using blackmail power against his political and institutional sponsors from the world of Masonry, belonging to the P2 lodge, or to the Institute for Religious Works (the Vatican Bank) with whom he had managed investments and financing with conspicuous sums of money, some of it coming from Cosa Nostra and public agencies".

Gelli was accused of demanding Calvi's death as punishment for embezzling money from Banco Ambrosiano that belonged both to Gelli and to senior figures in the Mafia. The Mafia allegedly wanted to prevent Calvi from revealing that the Banco Ambrosiano had been used for money laundering. Gelli denied involvement but acknowledged that the financier was murdered. In his statement before the court, he said that the killing was commissioned in the People's Republic of Poland. This is thought to be a reference to Calvi's alleged involvement in financing the Solidarity trade union movement at the request of Pope John Paul II, allegedly on behalf of the Vatican. However, Gelli's name was not in the final indictment at the trial which started in October 2005.

== Trials in Italy ==
In 2005, the Italian magistrates investigating Calvi's death took their inquiries to London in order to question witnesses. They had been cooperating with Chief Superintendent Trevor Smith who built his case partly on evidence provided by Katz. Smith had been able to make the first arrest of a UK witness who had allegedly committed perjury during the Calvi inquest.

On 5 October 2005, the trial began in Rome of the five individuals charged with Calvi's murder. The defendants were Calò, Carboni, Kleinszig, Ernesto Diotallevi, and Calvi's former driver and bodyguard Silvano Vittor. The trial took place in a specially fortified courtroom in Rome's Rebibbia prison. All five were cleared of murdering Calvi on 6 June 2007. Judge Mario Lucio d'Andria threw out the charges, citing "insufficient evidence" after hearing 20 months of evidence. The court ruled that Calvi's death was murder and not suicide. The defence suggested that there were plenty of people with a motive for Calvi's murder, including Vatican officials and Mafia figures who wanted to ensure his silence. Legal experts following the trial said that the prosecutors found it hard to present a convincing case due to the 25 years that had elapsed since Calvi's death. Additionally, key witnesses were unwilling to testify, untraceable, or dead. The prosecution called for Manuela Kleinszig to be cleared, stating that there was insufficient evidence against her, but they sought life sentences for the four men.

Katz claimed that it was likely that senior figures in the Italian establishment escaped prosecution. "The problem is that the people who probably actually ordered the death of Calvi are not in the dock - but to get to those people might be very difficult indeed". Katz said that it was "probably true" that the Mafia carried out the killing, but that the gangsters suspected of the crime were either dead or missing. The verdict in the trial was not the end of the matter, since the prosecutor's office in Rome had opened a second investigation by June 2007 implicating Gelli and others.

In May 2009, the prosecution dropped the case against Gelli. According to the magistrate, there was insufficient evidence to argue that Gelli had played a role in planning and executing the crime. On 7 May 2010, the Court of Appeals confirmed the acquittal of Calò, Carboni, and Diotallevi. Public prosecutor Luca Tescaroli commented that "Calvi has been murdered for the second time." On 18 November 2011, the Court of Cassation confirmed the acquittal. Calò is still serving a life sentence on unrelated Mafia charges.

== Films about Calvi's death ==
BBC One's programme Panorama chronicled Calvi's last days and uncovered new evidence which suggested that others had been involved in his death. The 1983 PBS Frontline documentary "God's Banker" investigated Calvi's links with the Vatican and P2, and questioned whether his death was really a suicide. The circumstances surrounding his death were made into the feature film I Banchieri di Dio - Il Caso Calvi (God's Bankers - The Calvi Case) in 2001.

In 1990, The Comic Strip Presents produced a spoof version of Calvi's story under the title Spaghetti Hoops, with Nigel Planer in the lead role, directed by Peter Richardson, and co-written by him and Pete Richens. In The Godfather Part III (1990), he is fictionalized as Frederick Keinszig, alluding to his involvement in the Banco Ambrosiano scandal (the Vatican bank in the film). Variety magazine described the comedy film The Pope Must Die (1991) as "loosely based on the Roberto Calvi banking scandal". In the 2009 film The Imaginarium of Doctor Parnassus, the character of Tony is found hanging alive under Blackfriars Bridge, which director Terry Gilliam described as "an homage to Roberto Calvi".

Calvi is featured in the Italian film Il divo (2008), a biography of former Italian Prime Minister Giulio Andreotti.

== See also ==
- Accounting scandals
- Corporate scandal
- List of unsolved murders (1980–1999)
- List of unsolved murders in the United Kingdom
