= Hands of Perón =

Body part of Juan Perón

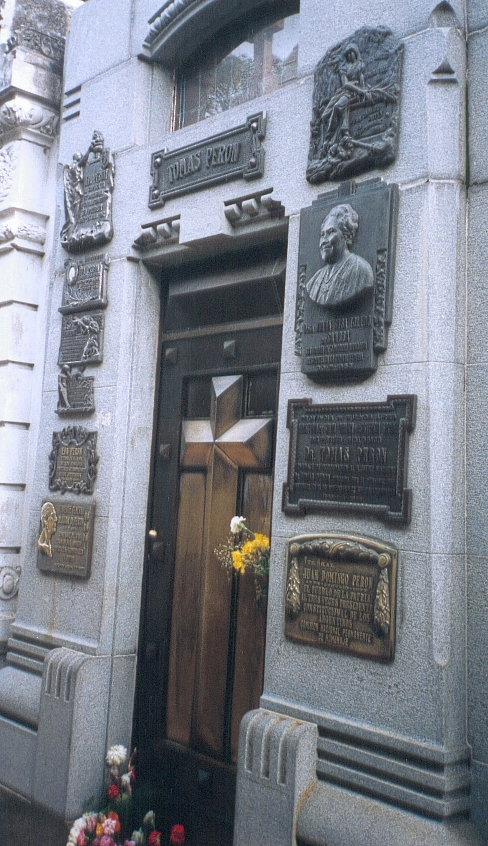
The Perón family crypt, where Juan Perón's casket lay from 1976 until 2006 and from where his hands were removed in 1987.

The hands of Juan Perón, former President of Argentina, were dismembered and removed from his tomb in 1987 by unknown burglars.

== The incident ==
Perón died in July 1974. His casket remained in the Quinta de Olivos presidential residence until the March 1976 coup. The coffin was then placed in the Perón family tomb in Chacarita Cemetery, located in the Chacarita ward of the city of Buenos Aires.

In June 1987, 13 years after his death, the Peronist Justicialist Party received an anonymous letter claiming Perón's hands had been removed from his tomb along with his army cap and sword; the letter demanded the party pay a US$8 million ransom for their return. When authorities checked Perón's tomb, they discovered that it had indeed been broken into and the hands and other items removed. Forensic experts who examined the body said the mutilation had occurred only a short time before the discovery. One source states that the tomb was broken into on June 23, 1987, and that a poem written to him by his last wife, Isabel, had also been removed from the tomb. At the time, some news reports stated that the hands had been removed with "a surgical instrument", but later reports state that the dismemberment had been done with an electric saw.

The head of the Justicialist Party, Vicente Saadi, refused to allow the ransom to be paid. A criminal investigation was begun under the leadership of judge Jaime Far Suau: although six men were arrested and five arraigned, none were charged in relation to the incident. No suspect has ever been charged, and the hands have never been recovered.

Many of those involved in the investigation of the disappearance of Perón's hands (including Judge Far Suau) have since died, some under circumstances considered questionable. There is evidence that the theft had some sort of official support, as the robbers used a key to enter the tomb.

Argentinian anthropologist Rosana Guber has written that Perón's hands were seen by Argentinians as a symbol of his power, and that their theft was not just a simple criminal matter but also had deep cultural meaning; she viewed the debate about the hands as symbolic of the attempt to promote democracy in the country. Lyman Johnson viewed the dismemberment as "a catalyst to destroy the symbolic cult of Perón".

In their book Second Death: Licio Gelli, The P2 Masonic Lodge and The Plot to Destroy Juan Peron, writers Damian Nabot and David Cox write that the Masonic lodge P2, also known as the Propaganda Due, were involved in the theft, and that there was a ritual involved in the cutting of Peron's hands.

== See also ==
- Pedro Eugenio Aramburu was the president after the removal of Perón in 1955. In 1974, his corpse was stolen by Montoneros to force the return of Evita Perón's body to Argentina. Evita's corpse had disappeared after her husband fled the country.
- After his execution in Bolivia in 1967, the hands of Argentinian revolutionary Che Guevara were sent to Argentina for identification. They were later sent to Cuba.
