= Bartolomeu Constantin Săvoiu =

Bartolomeu Constantin Săvoiu (born February 18, 1945, in Bucharest) is a leader of a Masonic organization (not recognized by the National Grand Lodge of Romania) and an active participant in Romania's sovereigntist political movement.

In 1970, he moved to France following his marriage, where he worked as an economist in various business sectors for 41 years (the last five years as the Bucharest representative of a French pharmaceutical and cosmetics company).

Since the late 1990s, he has flirted with various Romanian nationalist and right-wing political parties, although without any electoral success.

Although he had never served on active military duty, in 2006, shortly after re-establishing himself in Romania, he was awarded the rank of retired brigadier general in the Romanian Armed Forces.

== Political Connections and Controversies ==
Journalistic investigations have documented the following:

- Anti-European stance. Relations with Russia: In May 2025, Săvoiu published messages praising Vladimir Putin. He attacks “globalism” and “Sorosism,” echoing propaganda persistently promoted by Putin's Russia and the far right, and strongly criticizes European leaders who support Ukraine. This makes his personal claims of having received medals and distinctions in recognition of his pro-European stance all the more questionable.
- Călin Georgescu. George Simion: Beginning in December 2024, posts promoted by Săvoiu expressed electoral support for Călin Georgescu and, subsequently, from 2025 onward, for George Simion. He endorses conspiracy theories alleging that France interfered in Romania's 2025 presidential election.
- Adrian Robertin Dinu: Together with Dinu, he founded the Alliance for Law and Order (Alianța Lege și Ordine) political party. Dinu was subsequently investigated in a treason case involving the group known as the “Vlad Țepeș Command” (Comandamentul Vlad Țepeș).
- The Toni Greblă Case: In 2015, Săvoiu was investigated by Romania's National Anticorruption Directorate (DNA) in connection with certain commercial transactions. He was not indicted in that case, and the other defendants mentioned were acquitted.
