= Banco Ambrosiano =

Defunct Italian bank (1896–1982)

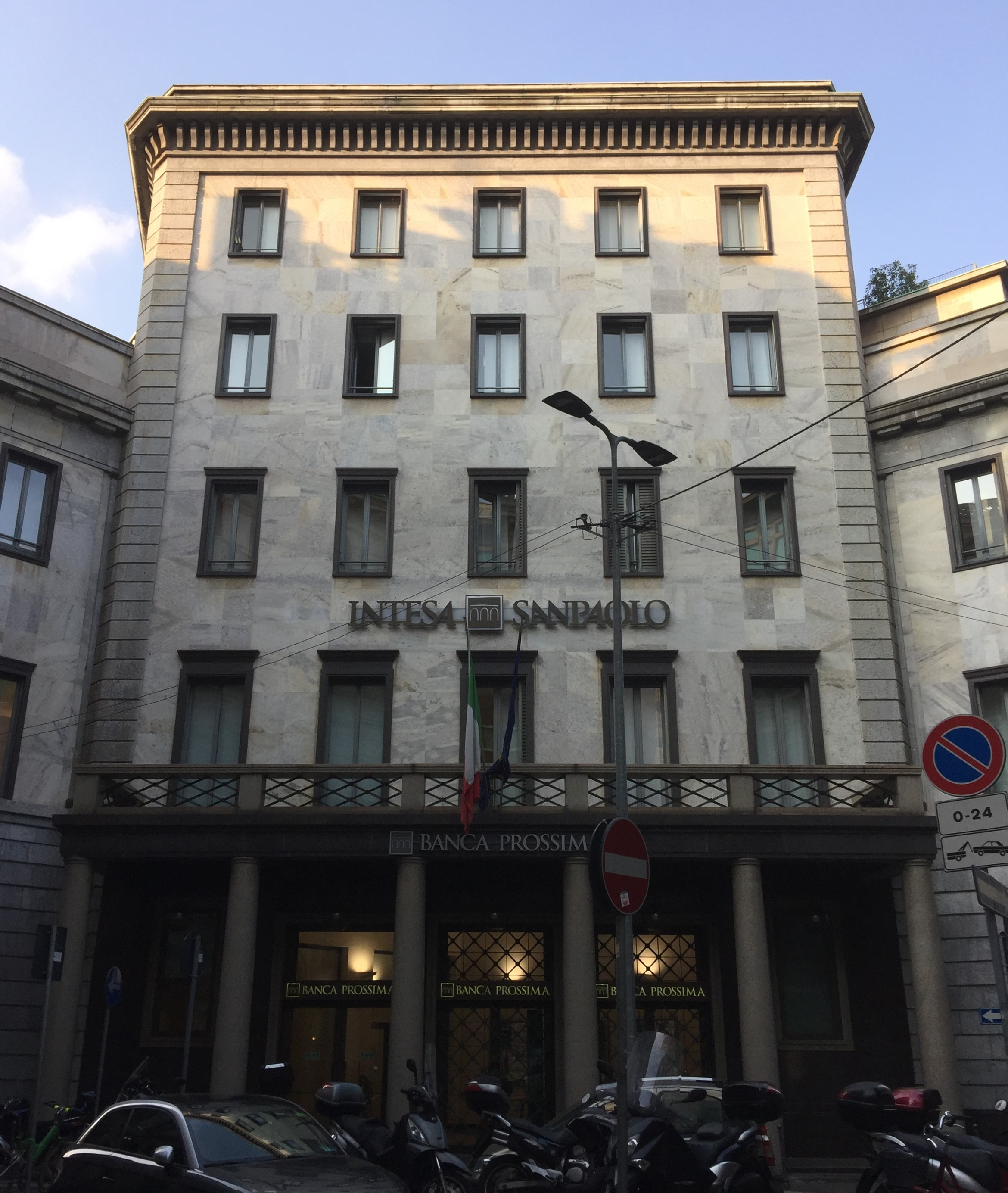
- Former head office in Milan
- Company type: Finance and insurance
- Industry: Banking; Financial services
- Founded: 1896; 130 years ago
- Defunct: 1982; 44 years ago
- Fate: Insolvency: Banco Ambrosiano's banking subsidiaries were placed into the receivership of the Banca d'Italia.; Nuovo Banco Ambrosiano was created to succeed the bank
- Successor: Nuovo Banco Ambrosiano
- Headquarters: Largo Bortolo Belotti, Milan
- Key people: Giuseppe Tovini (Founder); Roberto Calvi (Chairman)
- Products: Retail banking Commercial banking Investment banking Investment management Private equity
- Subsidiaries: Ambrosiano Overseas; Banco Ambrosiano Holding

Banco Ambrosiano (Italian pronunciation: [ˈban.ko am.broˈzja.no]; lit. 'Milanese Bank') was an Italian bank that was established in 1896 and collapsed in 1982. The Vatican-based Institute for the Works of Religion, commonly known as the Vatican Bank, was Banco Ambrosiano's main shareholder.

== Members ==
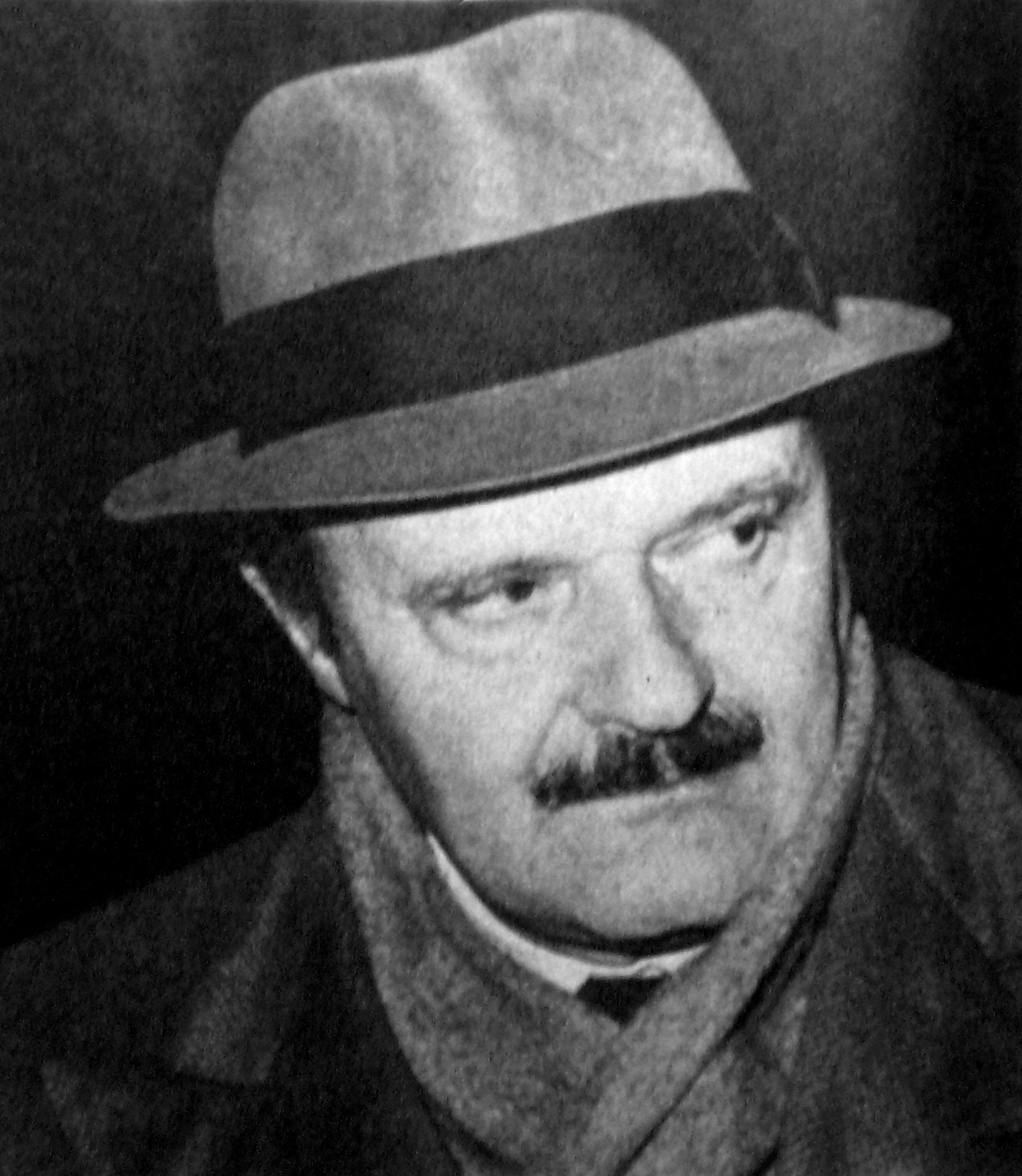
Roberto Calvi.

- Franco Ratti, chairman
- Carlo Canesi, senior manager then chairman of Banco Ambrosiano Holding starting from 1965
- Roberto Calvi, general manager of Banco Ambrosiano since 1971, appointed chairman from 1975 to his death in June 1982; he was often referred to as "God's Banker" because of his close financial ties with the Vatican
- Paul Marcinkus, president of Vatican Bank (aka "Istituto per le Opere di Religione"), had been a director of Ambrosiano Overseas, based in Nassau, Bahamas
- Carlo De Benedetti became deputy-chairman for less than two months, after Roberto Calvi's trial
- Nuovo Banco Ambrosiano is under Giovanni Bazoli
- Carlos Guido Natal Coda, head of the Argentine branch of Banco Ambrosiano (Coda is wrongly believed to be the predecessor of Emilio Massera as commander-in-chief of the Argentine Navy, which actually was Almirante Carlos Eduardo Álvarez Igarazbal

== Before 1981 ==
Logo in the 80s

The Banco Ambrosiano was founded in Milan in 1896 by Giuseppe Tovini, a Catholic lawyer and banker from Valle Camonica, and was named after Saint Ambrose, the fourth-century archbishop of the city. Tovini's purpose was to create a Catholic bank as a counterbalance to Italy's Jewish banks, and its goals were "serving moral organisations, pious works, and religious bodies set up for charitable aims." The bank came to be known as the "priests' bank"; one chairman was Franco Ratti, nephew to Pope Pius XI. In the 1960s, the bank began to expand its business, opening a holding company in Luxembourg in 1963 which came to be known as Banco Ambrosiano Holding. This was under the direction of Carlo Canesi, then a senior manager, and from 1965, chairman. His deputy was Roberto Calvi.

In 1971, Calvi became general manager, and in 1975 he was appointed chairman. Calvi expanded Ambrosiano's interests, including the creation of off-shore companies in the Bahamas and South America; a controlling interest in the Banca Cattolica del Veneto; and funds for the publishing house Rizzoli to finance the Corriere della Sera newspaper (giving Calvi control behind the scenes for the benefit of his associates in the P2 masonic lodge). Calvi was a friend of American Archbishop Paul Marcinkus, president of the Istituto per le Opere di Religione (the formal name of the Vatican Bank), and involved both the IOR and Marcinkus in his dealings.

Ambrosiano provided funds for political parties in Italy, and for both the Somoza dictatorship in Nicaragua and for its Sandinista opposition. There are rumours that it provided money for Solidarity in Poland. At Lugano, Banco del Gottardo, which was founded in 1957 with Dr. August Gansser-Burckhardt as president, became Banco Ambrosiano's Swiss arm in 1963 with Swiss managers and a 45% stake indirectly through the Banco Ambrosiano Holding S. A., Luxembourg, which Banco Ambosiano held a 70% stake, and was the linchpin of Calvi's offshore system with branches established in Nassau (Bahamas) and Luxembourg in the 1970s and after its failure Sumitomo Bank obtained Gotthardt Bank in 1984 and added the Monaco branch in 1994. (Note: Sumitomo Bank obtained Banco del Gottardo in 1983 and sold the bank in 1999 to Rentenanstalt. During this time many Russian investors were associated with the Gotthard Bank (Lugano). On 9 March 1994, Andrey Vavilov, who was Russia's first deputy finance minister, and Oleg Davydov, who was Russia's foreign trade minister, created the Joint Russian-Swiss Banking Club Gottardo which acted as the intermediary for Russia to reduce its Soviet-era debts. According to Felipe Turover, who was appointed as Banco del Gottardo's adviser on 4 March 1994 by Russia, Banco del Gottardo acted as the intermediary from 1994 to 1997. Gottardo Financial Solutions, which was part of Banque du Gotthard, provided discrete services through many locations including Hong Kong, Luxembourg, Paris, Monaco, Vienna, Prague, Athens, Zurich, Geneva, Lausanne, Bellinzona, Chiasso, Locarno, Bergamo, Milan, and Nassau (Bahamas). In mid November 2005, Banque Jacob Safra (Suisse) SA obtained the Monaco branch Banque du Gothard (Monaco) which had been established in 1994. In early November 2007, Gotthard Bank vice president Rolf Doerig (Rolf Dörig) of Rentenanstalt / Swiss life stated that Banco del Gottardo was sold for CHF 1.875 billion to Generali's BSI AG which fully incorporated the bank on 1 July 2008.)

Calvi used his complex network of overseas banks and companies to move money out of Italy, to inflate share prices, and to secure massive unsecured loans. In 1978, the Bank of Italy produced a report on Ambrosiano that predicted future disaster and led to criminal investigations. Soon afterward the investigating Milanese magistrate, Alessandrini, was killed by a left-wing terrorist group, while the Bank of Italy official who superintended the inspection, Mario Sarcinelli, was imprisoned on charges that were later dismissed.

== After 1981 ==
In 1981, police raided the office of Propaganda Due to apprehend the Worshipful Master Licio Gelli and uncover further evidence against Roberto Calvi. Calvi was sentenced to four years in prison. He was released pending appeal and retained his position at the bank. Carlo de Benedetti of Olivetti bought into the bank and became deputy chairman, only to leave two months later after receiving Mafia threats and a lack of co-operation from Calvi. His replacement, longtime employee Roberto Rosone, was wounded in a Mafia shooting. The criminal organization responsible was the Banda della Magliana (Magliana Gang), which had taken over Rome's underworld in the late 1970s, and had been linked to political events of the anni di piombo (years of lead).

In 1982, the bank was unable to account for $1.287 billion (equivalent to $3.53 billion in present-day terms). Calvi fled the country on a false passport, and Rosone arranged for the Bank of Italy to take over. Calvi's personal secretary, Graziella Corrocher, left a note denouncing Calvi before leaping to her death from her office window. Calvi's body was found hanging from Blackfriars Bridge in London on June 18.

During July 1982, funds to the offshore interests were cut off, leading to their collapse, and in August, the bank was replaced by the Nuovo Banco Ambrosiano under Giovanni Bazoli. Pope John Paul II pledged full transparency regarding the bank's links to the Vatican and brought in lay bankers, including German financial expert Hermann Abs, a move that was publicly criticized by Simon Wiesenthal, due to Abs's role as top banker to Nazi Germany from 1938 to 1945. There was much argument over who should take responsibility for losses incurred by the Old Ambrosiano's off-shore companies, and the Holy See (Vatican) eventually agreed to pay out a substantial sum without accepting liability.

In April 1992, Carlo De Benedetti, former deputy chairman of Banco Ambrosiano, and 32 other people were convicted of fraud by a Milan court in connection with the bank's collapse. Benedetti was sentenced to six years and four months in prison. His sentence was overturned in April 1998 by the Court of Cassation.

In 1994, former Socialist Prime Minister Bettino Craxi was indicted in the Banco Ambrosiano case, along with Licio Gelli, head of Propaganda Due, and former Justice Minister Claudio Martelli. In April 1998, the Court of Cassation confirmed Licio Gelli's 12-year sentence for the Ambrosiano crash.

== Clearstream scandal ==
Just before the media revealed the Ambrosiano scandal, Gérard Soisson, the manager of the transaction clearing company Clearstream, was found dead in Corsica, two months after Ernest Backes' dismissal from Clearstream in May 1983. Banco Ambrosiano was one of the many banks to have unpublished accounts in Clearstream. Backes, formerly the third-ranking officer of Clearstream and a primary source for Denis Robert's book on Clearstream's scandal, Revelation$, claims he "was fired because (he) knew too much about the Ambrosiano scandal. When Soisson died, the Ambrosiano affair wasn't yet known as a scandal. (After it was revealed) I realized that Soisson and I had been at the crossroads. We moved all those transactions known later in the scandal to Lima and other branches. Nobody even knew there was a Banco Ambrosiano branch in Lima and other South American countries."

As of 2005, the Italian justice has opened up again the investigation concerning the murder of Roberto Calvi, Ambrosiano's chairman, but it asked the support of Ernest Backes and will investigate Gerard Soisson's death, according to Lucy Komisar. Licio Gelli, the headmaster of P2 Masonic Lodge, and the mafioso Giuseppe "Pippo" Calò are being prosecuted for the assassination of Roberto Calvi.

== Falklands war involvement ==
France prohibited deliveries of Exocet AM39 missiles purchased by Peru to avoid the possibility of Peru giving them to Argentina, because they knew that payment would be made with a credit card from the Central Bank of Peru, but British intelligence had detected that the guarantee was a deposit of two hundred million dollars from the Banco Ambrosiano Andino, an owned subsidiary of the Banco Ambrosiano. An Italian investigation into Propaganda Due's involvement in the arms trade uncovered a contract for 52 Exocets signed by Carlos Alberto Corti, an Argentinian naval officer and member of P2.

== Roberto Calvi's 1982 murder ==
David Yallop popularized a conspiracy theory that Calvi, with the assistance of Propaganda Due, may have been responsible for the death of Pope John Paul I, who was planning a reform of Vatican finances.

Calvi's family maintains that he was an honest man manipulated by others. According to the magistrates who indicted Propaganda Due's leader, Licio Gelli, and Sicilian Mafia boss, Giuseppe Calò, for Calvi's murder, Gelli would have ordered his death for embezzling his and the mafia's money, while the mafia wanted to prevent him revealing how Calvi helped its money laundering.

== See also ==
- Nugan Hand Bank – A similarly-run operation which was allegedly involved in clandestine operations in Australia.
- Operation Gladio – Clandestine Western military operations during the Cold War
- Banda della Magliana – Italian criminal organization
- The Bankers of God: The Calvi Affair
- Banking in Italy
- List of banks in Italy
