= Carlo Senaldi =

Italian politician (1941–2025)

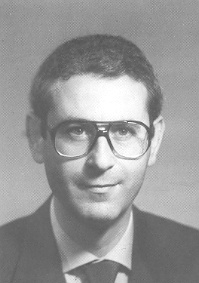
Image of Carlo Senaldi

Carlo Senaldi (7 November 1941 – 19 April 2025) was an Italian politician who served as a Deputy. He died on 19 April 2025, at the age of 83.
