= Tina Anselmi =

Italian politician (1927–2016)

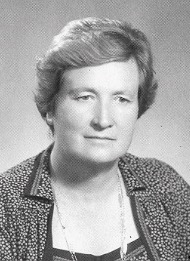

Minister of Health
- In office 11 March 1978 – 4 August 1979
- Prime Minister: Giulio Andreotti
- Preceded by: Luciano Dal Falco
- Succeeded by: Renato Altissimo

Minister of Labour and Social Security
- In office 29 July 1976 – 11 March 1978
- Prime Minister: Giulio Andreotti
- Preceded by: Mario Toros
- Succeeded by: Vincenzo Scotti

Member of the Chamber of Deputies
- In office 5 June 1968 – 22 April 1992
- Constituency: Venice–Treviso

Personal details
- Born: 25 March 1927 Castelfranco Veneto, Italy
- Died: 1 November 2016 (aged 89) Castelfranco Veneto, Italy
- Party: Christian Democracy
- Education: Catholic University of Milan

Tina Anselmi (25 March 1927 – 1 November 2016) was an Italian politician. A member of the Italian resistance movement during World War II, she went on to become the first woman to hold a ministerial position in an Italian government.

In 1981, she headed the parliamentary commission of inquiry into the illegal P2 Masonic Lodge.

== Early life ==
Anselmi was born in Castelfranco Veneto, in the province of Treviso. Her father was an assistant pharmacist persecuted by the fascists because he was socialist, and her mother and grandmother ran an inn together.

On 26 September 1944, Nazi soldiers forced her and a group of other students to witness the hanging of a group of 31 young Partisans. As a result, she joined the resistance movement and became part of the Cesare Battisti brigade. That year, she also joined the Christian Democracy party.

During World War II, Anselmi attended the local high school and then the teaching institute in Bassano del Grappa. After the war, she studied literature at the Catholic University of Milan and became a primary school teacher.

== Political career ==
While working as a teacher, Anselmi held positions in Christian trade unions, including the primary teachers' union from 1948 to 1955. In 1959, she joined the national council of Christian Democracy, and she was the party's deputy leader from 1968 to 1992. In 1963, she was elected vice-president of the Female Board of the European Union. From 1958 to 1964, she was head of the Christian Democracy party's youth programmes.

From 1968 to 1987, she was a Member of the Italian Chamber of Deputies, re-elected five times in the Venice-Treviso district. She served three times as undersecretary to the Department of Labour and Social Services, and in 1976 she became the first woman to be a member of an Italian cabinet, being chosen by Giulio Andreotti as Minister for Labour and Social Security. She held this position from 1976 to 1979. She served as Minister for Health from 1978 to 1979.

Anselmi is best known for having been the main proposer of Italian laws on equal opportunities, a matter she always fought for in her political life. For example, in 1977, she passed a bill which recognized fathers as primary caregivers for their children, and allowed for both fathers and mothers to have time away for their children. In the same year, a major piece of legislation was passed on gender parity in employment conditions, of which Anselmi was a key supporter. She chaired the National Equal Opportunities Commission until 1994, and played a significant role in the introduction of Italy's National Health Service.

In 1981, she headed the Parliamentary Commission of Inquiry into the illegal P2 Masonic Lodge (Commissione parlamentare d'inchiesta sulla Loggia massonica P2); the lodge, at the time, was considered a threat to society. Anselmi wrote the commission's final majority report that was approved in 1984, and all activity of the lodge ceased the following year.

Anselmi was the chair of a commission of inquiry into the work of Italian soldiers in Somalia, and of a national commission on the consequences of laws for the Italian Jewish community. She was an honorary vice president of the National Institute for the History of the Liberation Movement in Italy.

Later in her life, she began to write about her experiences in the Resistance; in 2003, she wrote Zia, cos'è la Resistenza? (Auntie, what's the Resistance?), a book explaining the Italian Resistance to young people.

In 2004, she wrote a second book for young people, titled Bella ciao: la resistenza raccontata ai ragazzi (Hey beautiful: the Resistance explained to children).

In 2006, she published her memoir together with Anna Vinci, as Storia Di Una Passione Politica (Story of a Passion for Politics).

== Death ==
Anselmi died at home in Castelfranco Veneto, Treviso, on 1 November 2016, aged 89.

== Awards and recognition ==
- On 18 June 1998, Anselmi was awarded the Knight's Great Cross of the Order of Merit of the Italian Republic.
- In 2005, she received the Archivio Disarmo – Golden Doves for Peace prize, awarded by Istituto di Ricerche Internazionali Archivio Disarmo.
- In June 2016, Anselmi was featured on an Italian postage stamp, the only living person to be honoured in this way.

== Electoral history ==
Election	House	Constituency	Party	Votes	Result
1968	Chamber of Deputies	Venice–Treviso	DC	40,467	Elected
1972	Chamber of Deputies	Venice–Treviso	DC	38,389	Elected
1976	Chamber of Deputies	Venice–Treviso	DC	74,403	Elected
1979	Chamber of Deputies	Venice–Treviso	DC	77,944	Elected
1983	Chamber of Deputies	Venice–Treviso	DC	49,415	Elected
1987	Chamber of Deputies	Venice–Treviso	DC	57,235	Elected

Political offices
Preceded by Luciano Dal Falco	Minister of Health; 1978–1979	Succeeded by Renato Altissimo
