= Propaganda Due =

Italian masonic lodge banned in 1982

Propaganda 2 (P2) Propaganda Due
- Leader: Licio Gelli
- Founded: 1877; 149 years ago (as Propaganda Massonica); 1966; 60 years ago (as Propaganda Due)
- Dissolved: 1925; 101 years ago (Propaganda Massonica banned); 1976; 50 years ago (officially by Grand Orient of Italy); 25 January 1982; 44 years ago (by Italian law)
- Preceded by: Propaganda Massonica (1877–1925)
- Membership: ~962 (1981)
- Ideology: Neo-fascism; Anti-communism
- Political position: Far-right
- National affiliation: Banda della Magliana; Cosa Nostra (alleged)
- International affiliation: Operation Gladio (alleged)

Propaganda Due (Italian: [propaˈɡanda ˈduːe], P2) was a Masonic lodge, founded in 1877, within the tradition of Continental Freemasonry and under the authority of Grand Orient of Italy. Its Masonic charter was withdrawn in 1976, and it was transformed by Licio Gelli into an international, illegal, clandestine, anti-communist, anti-Soviet, anti-Marxist, and radical right criminal organization and secret society operating in contravention of Article 18 of the Constitution of Italy that banned all such secret associations. Gelli continued to operate the unaffiliated lodge from 1976 to 1984. P2 was implicated in numerous Italian crimes and mysteries, including the collapse of the Holy See-affiliated Banco Ambrosiano, the contract killings of journalist Carmine Pecorelli and mobbed-up banker Roberto Calvi, and political corruption cases within the nationwide mani pulite bribery scandal. P2 came to light through the investigations into the collapse of Michele Sindona's financial empire.

P2 was sometimes referred to as a "state within a state" or a "shadow government". The lodge had among its members prominent journalists, members of the Italian parliament, industrialists, and senior Italian military officers —including Silvio Berlusconi, who later became Prime Minister of Italy; the House of Savoy pretender to the Italian throne Prince Victor Emmanuel; and the heads of all three Italian foreign intelligence services (at the time SISDE, SISMI, and CESIS). When searching Gelli's villa in 1982, police found a document entitled "Plan for Democratic Rebirth", which called for the consolidation of the media, the suppression of Italian labour unions, and the rewriting of the Italian constitution, culminating in a creeping hollowing-out of the State.

Outside of Italy, P2 had many active lodges in Venezuela, Uruguay, Brazil, Chile, and Argentina. Among its Argentine members were Raúl Alberto Lastiri, who was briefly interim president of the country after the end of the self-styled "Argentine Revolution" dictatorship (1966–1973); Emilio Massera, who was part of the military junta led by Jorge Rafael Videla during Argentina's last civil-military dictatorship (1976–1983); the Peronist orthodox José López Rega, who was Minister of Social Welfare (1973–1975) and founder of the paramilitary organisation Argentine Anticommunist Alliance (AAA); and former Argentine Army general, Dirty War perpetrator, and convicted murderer Guillermo Suárez Mason.

P2's leader, Gelli, has been recognized in the 2020s as the mastermind behind the 1980 Bologna massacre, the deadliest terrorist attack in post-WWII Italy.

== Foundation ==
With the proclamation of the Kingdom of Italy, the Grand Orient of Italy, the most important and numerous Masonic community in Italy, felt the need to safeguard the identity of its most prominent members, even within the organisation. For this reason, the membership of the latter did not appear on any official list, but was known only to the Grand Master, who recorded it as an initiation "by ear". It was not until 1877 that Giuseppe Mazzoni began to draw up a list called Propaganda Massonica, officially establishing the lodge in question and becoming its first venerable master.

Propaganda was founded in 1877, in Turin, as Propaganda Massonica. This lodge was frequented by politicians and government officials from across Italy who were unable to attend their own lodges and included prominent members of the Piedmont nobility. Since its foundation, the main feature of the lodge was to provide adequate cover and secrecy for the most important initiates, both inside and outside the Masonic organisation.

Adriano Lemmi (Grand Master from 1885 to 1895) was initiated into the Propaganda lodge in 1877 and helped to give it prestige by bringing together members of parliament, senators and bankers who, due to their positions, were forced to leave their local lodges and settle in Rome. During its history, the lodge included important Italian figures, such as the poet Giosuè Carducci, politicians Francesco Crispi and Arturo Labriola and journalist Gabriele Galantara.

Even after Lemmi's Grand Mastership, the lodge continued to be an important reference point in the organisation of the Masonic Grand Orient. Among its members, at the beginning of the 20th, century there were Giovanni Ameglio (1920), Mario Cevolotto, Eugenio Chiesa (1913), Alessandro Fortis (1909), Gabriele Galantara (1907), and Giorgio Pitacco (1909).

Propaganda Massonica was banned in 1925, alongside all other Masonic lodges and secret societies, by the Fascist regime. The Grand Master Domizio Torrigiani signed the decree dissolving all lodges. However, Italian Freemasonry was reconstituted in exile in Paris on 12 January 1930.

Following the end of World War II, Freemasonry became legal again and the lodge was reformed. The name was changed to Propaganda Due when the Grand Orient of Italy numbered its lodges. By the 1960s, the lodge was all but inactive, holding few meetings. This original lodge was only tangentially related to the one established by Licio Gelli in 1966, two years after becoming a Freemason. On the contrary, Giuliano Di Bernardo, former Grand Master of the Grand Orient of Italy, affirmed that "the cards of the P2 affiliates bore the signature of the Grand Master, therefore they were all effective members of the Grand Orient of Italy."

With the return of the Grand Orient to Italy, the lodge was reconstituted under the name 'Propaganda 2', for reasons of numbering of Italian lodges imposed by organisational necessity. The lodges resumed their activities, returning to the direct authority of the Grand Master of the Order until the advent of Licio Gelli. During the Cold War, Italian Freemasonry traditions of free-thinking under the Risorgimento transformed into fervent anti-communism. The increasing influence of the political left at the end of the 1960s became a concern to the Masons of Italy. Gelli was first appointed by Lino Salvini, Grand Master of the Grand Orient of Italy—one of Italy's largest Masonic lodges, to represent him in all functions within the lodge (1970), with task of reorganizing P2, then he was appointed Venerable Master, i.e. head in all respects (1975).

Based on notes from the SISMI and SISDE discovered by magistrate Vincenzo Calia during his investigation into the death of Enrico Mattei, the P2 Lodge was allegedly founded by Eugenio Cefis, who ran it until he became president of Montedison. After the oil scandal, he was replaced by the duo Licio Gelli and Umberto Ortolani. According to other sources, the secret head of the P2 Lodge was former Christian Democrat Giulio Andreotti.

Gelli was initiated into Freemasonry on 6 November 1963, at the "Gian Domenico Romagnosi" lodge in Rome. The Parliamentary Commission believes that Gelli had also gained influence in the "court" of Argentine General Juan Domingo Perón (a photograph shows him at the Casa Rosada with the President and Giulio Andreotti): he was subsequently affiliated with the Hod Lodge by Venerable Master Alberto Ascarelli and promoted to the rank of Master.

Subsequently, in the "Garibaldi – Pisacane di Ponza – Hod" lodge, Gelli began to introduce numerous prominent figures, earning the appreciation of his venerable Master, who introduced him to Giordano Gamberini, Grand Master of the Order. Gelli convinced Gamberini to initiate new members "on the sword" (i.e. outside the specific Masonic ritual) and to include them in the list of "covered brothers" of the P2 lodge.

Gelli took a list of "dormant members", or members no longer invited to participate in Masonic rituals, as Italian Freemasonry was under close scrutiny by Christian Democracy (DC) in power through the Pentapartito. Through these initial connections, Gelli was able to extend his network throughout the echelons of the Italian establishment. In 1967, P2 initiated former SIFAR Brigadier-General Giovanni Allavena, who handed Gelli approximately 157,000 confidential files (see fascicoli riservati del SIFAR) on many public persons, including intercepted telephone calls, photographs, correspondence, and private information.

== Discovery ==
The activities of P2 were discovered by prosecutors while investigating banker Michele Sindona, the collapse of his bank and his ties to the Sicilian Mafia. In March 1981, police found a list of alleged members in Gelli's house in Arezzo. It contained 962 names, among which were important state officials, important politicians and a number of military officers, including the heads of the three Italian secret services. Future Italian prime minister Silvio Berlusconi was on the list, although he had not yet entered politics at the time. Another famous member was Victor Emmanuel, the son of the last Italian king.

Prime Minister Arnaldo Forlani (whose chef de cabinet was a P2 member as well) appointed a Parliamentary Commission of Inquiry, headed by the independent DC Tina Anselmi. In May 1981, Forlani was forced to resign due to the P2 scandal, causing the fall of the Italian government.

In January 1982, the P2 lodge was definitively disbanded by the Law 25 January 1982, no. 17. In July 1982, new documents were found hidden in the false bottom of a suitcase belonging to Gelli's daughter at Fiumicino airport in Rome. The documents were entitled Memorandum sulla situazione italiana ("Memorandum on the Italian Situation") and Piano di rinascita democratica ("Plan of Democratic Rebirth"), and are seen as the political programme of P2. According to these documents, the main enemies of Italy were the Italian Communist Party (PCI) and the trade unions, particularly the Communist Italian General Confederation of Labour (CGIL). These had to be isolated and cooperation with the PCI, the second biggest party in Italy and one of the largest in Europe, which was proposed in the Historic Compromise by Aldo Moro, needed to be disrupted.

Gelli's goal was to form a new political and economic elite to lead Italy away from the danger of Communist rule. More controversially, it sought to do this by means of an authoritarian form of democracy. P2 advocated a programme of extensive political corruption: "political parties, newspapers and trade unions can be the objects of possible solicitations which could take the form of economic-financial manoeuvres. The availability of sums not exceeding 30 to 40 billion lire (Note: 40 billion lire in 1982 was equivalent to €74.2 million in 2020.) would seem sufficient to allow carefully chosen men, acting in good faith, to conquer key positions necessary for overall control."

== P2's influence ==
P2 was implicated in numerous Italian scandals and mysteries. Opinions about the importance and reach of the P2 differ. Some see P2 as a reactionary, shadow government ready to preempt a takeover of power in case of an electoral victory of the Italian Communist Party (PCI). Among them, there were Massimo D'Alema, President of the Bicameral Commission that aimed to reform the Italian constitution, and the former Italian President Sandro Pertini. Others think it was nothing more than a sordid association of people eager to improve their careers by making powerful and important connections (e.g. the master Indro Montanelli).

=== Kidnapping and murder of Aldo Moro ===
According to the Italian magistrate Gherardo Colombo, Propaganda Due had a role in the kidnapping and murder of Aldo Moro because he opened the door to the PCI and Francesco Cossiga was powerless.

=== Italicus Express bombing ===
P2 was also heavily involved in the Italicus Express bombing (1974). One of the magistrates of the Arezzo Public Prosecutor's Office investigating the massacre, Mario Marsili, was Licio Gelli's son-in-law and, at the time the lists were found (1980), he was found to be a "dormant" member of the P2 lodge (card n°. 506). The Parliamentary Commission of Inquiry declared:

[...] the Italicus massacre can be attributed to a neo-Fascist or neo-Nazi terrorist organisation operating in Tuscany; that the P2 Masonic lodge instigated the attacks and financed extra-parliamentary right-wing groups in Tuscany; that the P2 Masonic lodge is therefore seriously involved in the Italicus massacre and can even be held responsible in historical and political terms, if not in legal terms, as an essential economic, organisational and moral backdrop.

=== Corriere della Sera takeover ===
In 1977, P2 took control of the Corriere della Sera newspaper, a leading paper in Italy. At the time, the paper had encountered financial trouble and was unable to raise bank loans because its then editor, Piero Ottone, was considered hostile to the ruling Christian Democrats. Corriere's owners, the publishing house Rizzoli, struck a deal with Gelli, who provided the money with funds from the Vatican Bank directed by archbishop Paul Marcinkus. Ottone was fired and the paper's editorial line shifted to the right.

The paper published a long interview with Gelli in 1980. The interview was carried out by the television talk show host Maurizio Costanzo, who would also be exposed as a member of P2. Gelli said he was in favour of rewriting the Italian constitution towards a Gaullist presidential system. When asked what he always wanted to be, he replied: "A puppet master".

=== Bologna massacre ===
P2 members Gelli and the head of the secret service Pietro Musumeci were condemned for attempting to mislead the police investigation of the Bologna massacre on 2 August 1980, which killed 85 people and wounded more than 200. 2020s investigations, and following prosecutions from the Bologna Corte d'Assise, declared Licio Gelli, along with other P2 members, as the mastermind behind the massacre (the deadliest terroristic attack in Italy after the Second World War).

=== Banco Ambrosiano scandal ===
P2 became the target of considerable attention in the wake of the collapse of Banco Ambrosiano (one of Milan's principal banks, owned in part by the Vatican Bank), and the suspicious 1982 death of its president Roberto Calvi in London, initially ruled a suicide but later prosecuted as a murder. It was suspected by investigative journalists that some of the plundered funds went to P2 or to its members.

=== IRI slush funds ===
P2 was also involved in the Institute for the Industrial Reconstruction's slush funds, about which, during the 9th legislature, it was instituted a parliamentary commission of inquiry.

=== Protezione account ===
One of the documents found in 1981 was about a numbered bank account, the so-called "Protezione account", at the Union Bank of Switzerland in Lugano (Switzerland). It detailed the payment of US$7 million by the president of ENI, Florio Fiorini, through Roberto Calvi to the Italian Socialist Party (PSI) leader Claudio Martelli on behalf of Bettino Craxi, the socialist Prime Minister from 1983 to 1987.

The full extent of the payment became clear only twelve years later, in 1993, during the mani pulite (Italian for "clean hands") investigations into political corruption. The money was allegedly a kickback on a loan which the Socialist leaders had organised to help bail out the ailing. Rumours that the Minister of Justice, Martelli, was connected with the account had been circulating since investigations began into the P2 plot. He always flatly denied them. Learning that formal investigations were opened, he resigned as minister.

=== Murder of Pier Paolo Pasolini ===
The Italian filmmaker and left-wing public intellectual Pier Paolo Pasolini was brutally murdered in 1975. Speculation that Pasolini's murder was connected to P2 emerged in the 1990s, after his writings were revealed to have linked the P2 member Eugenio Cefis with violent crimes. As of 2023, a plea to reopen the case was filed based on DNA analysis and links the murder to the Banda della Magliana, a criminal organisation with close ties to far-right terrorism, as the probable culprits. Banda della Magliana has long been suggested to be linked to Gelli and P2, although concrete links have never been proven.

== Criminal organization ==
=== Parliamentary Commission of Inquiry ===
After the discovery of the lists, Arnaldo Forlani appointed a committee of three wise men (Vezio Crisafulli, Lionello Levi Sandri and Aldo Mazzini Sandulli) to provide cognitive and critical elements on the activities of P2. At the end of 1981, at the behest of the President of the Chamber of Deputies Nilde Iotti, a parliamentary commission of inquiry was set up, led by the Christian Democrat deputy Tina Anselmi. The commission carried out a long analysis to shed light on the Loggia, considered a point of reference in Italy for American secret service circles intending to keep Italian political life under control to the point, if necessary, of promoting specific constitutional reforms or organising a coup d'état. The commission – which concluded its work in 1984 – produced six reports.

The Parliamentary Commission of Inquiry, headed by Anselmi, concluded that the P2 lodge was a secret criminal organization. Allegations of surreptitious international relationships, mainly with Argentina (Gelli repeatedly suggested that he was a close friend of Juan Perón) and with some people suspected of affiliation with the US Central Intelligence Agency, were also partly confirmed. Soon a political debate overtook the legal level of the analysis. The majority report said that P2 action resulted in "the pollution of the public life of a nation. It aimed to alter, often in decisive fashion, the correct functioning of the institutions of the country, according to a project which ... intended to undermine our democracy." A minority report by Massimo Teodori concluded that P2 was not just an abnormal outgrowth from an essentially healthy system, as upheld by the majority report, but an inherent part of the system itself.

The P2 was also investigated by the Commission for Mass Murders for alleged involvement in some massacres, but this led to nothing relevant. The members of P2 and Gelli were fully acquitted of the charges of "conspiracy against the State" by the Court of Assizes and the Court of Assizes of Appeal in Rome between 1994 and 1996.

=== New Italian law prohibiting "secret lodges" ===
Even though outlawed by Fascist dictator Benito Mussolini in 1925, Masonic institutions have been tolerated in Italy since the end of World War II and have been quite open about their activities and membership. A special law was issued that prohibited secret lodges, i.e. those whose locations and dates of meeting are secret, like Gelli's pseudo-Masonic association. The Grande Oriente d'Italia, after taking disciplinary action against members with P2 connections, distanced itself from Gelli's lodge. Other laws introduced a prohibition on membership in allegedly secret organizations for some categories of state officials (especially military officers). These laws were questioned by a case from the European Court of Human Rights in 2013. Following an action brought by a serving British naval officer, the European Court has established as precedent the illegality of any member nation attempting to ban Masonic membership for military officers, as a breach of their human rights.

== Licio Gelli's 1981 list ==
On 17 March 1981, a list composed by Licio Gelli was found in his country house (Villa Wanda). The list was a combination of P2 members and the contents of Gelli's Rolodex. Many on the list were apparently never asked if they wanted to join P2, and it is unknown to what extent the list includes members who were formally initiated into the lodge. Since 1981, some of those on the list have demonstrated their distance from P2 to the satisfaction of the Italian legal system.

On 21 May 1981, the Italian government released the list. The Parliamentary Commission of Inquiry headed by Tina Anselmi considered the list reliable and genuine. It decided to publish the list in its concluding report, Relazione della Commissione parlamentare d'inchiesta sulla Loggia massonica P2.

The list contains 962 names (including Gelli's). It has been claimed that at least 1,000 names may still be secret, as the membership numbers begin with number 1,600, which suggests that the complete list has not yet been found. The list included all of the heads of the secret services, 195 officers of the different military and security forces (12 generals of the Carabinieri, five of the financial police Guardia di Finanza, 22 of the army, four of the air force, and eight admirals), as well as 44 members of parliament, three ministers and a secretary of a political party, leading magistrates, a few prefects and heads of police, bankers and businessmen, civil servants, journalists and broadcasters. Included were a top official of the Banco di Roma, Italy's third-largest bank at the time, and a former director-general of the Banca Nazionale del Lavoro (BNL), the country's largest bank. The political deputies on the list spanned most of the political spectrum, including the socialist PSI and PSDI, the centrist DC, PRI and PLI as well as the far-right MSI; the communist PCI was the only major political force not represented on the list.

After the list was discovered, the Prime Minister Arnaldo Forlani waited until 21 May 1981, before making public the list of P2 members, which included the names of two ministers then in office (the socialist Enrico Manca, and the Christian Democrat Franco Foschi) and five undersecretaries (Costantino Belluscio of the PSDI, Pasquale Bandiera of the PRI, Francesco Fossa of the PSI, Rolando Picchioni of the DC and Anselmo Martoni of the PSDI, the latter however mentioned as "asleep", i.e. resigned).

Among the 962 people listed as members of the Masonic lodge were politicians, businessmen, lawyers, company directors and, above all, members of the Italian armed forces and the Italian secret services. Michele Sindona himself appeared on the list of P2 members, confirming the suspicions of the investigating judges. Colonel Bianchi resisted various attempts at intimidation, as most of the people mentioned were still in power, and forwarded the list to the competent authorities. Among the generals, the press repeatedly mentioned Carlo Alberto dalla Chiesa, although there was only a registration form signed by him and no evidence of active membership.

Regarding the secret services, it was noted that not only the chiefs were registered (among them Vito Miceli, head of the SIOS and later director of the SID, Giuseppe Santovito of the SISMI, Walter Pelosi of the CESIS and Giulio Grassini of the SISDE) who were politically appointed, but also the most important officials with a consolidated internal career. Among these, the following stood out: General Giovanni Allavena (responsible for the SIFAR files), Colonel Giovanni Minerva (manager of the intricate case of the military aeroplane Argo 16 and considered one of the most important men in the entire post-war military service) and General Gianadelio Maletti, who along with Captain Antonio Labruna (also a member) was suspected of colluding with the subversive cells of Franco Freda and for this reason tried and convicted of aiding and abetting.

The hypothesis was put forward that the list found in Gelli's villa was not the complete list, and that many other names managed to avoid being implicated. In the parliamentary commission's reconstruction, to the 962 on the list found, one would have to add the alleged members of that occult circle of which Gelli was supposedly the link with the lodge. Gelli himself, as also highlighted by the Anselmi Commission, in an interview in 1976, had spoken of more than two thousand four hundred members.

According to the prosecutor of Rome at the time, there were a total of 2000 members on the two lists, while on 29 May 1977 the weekly magazine L'Espresso wrote: «P2 Lodge... It is the most compact and powerful nucleus of the Freemasons of Palazzo Giustiniani: it has 2400 members, the cream of finance, bureaucracy, the Armed Forces, the state's boyars, listed in a coded archive... Gelli, a regular interlocutor of the highest offices of the State (he often sees Andreotti and is received at the Quirinale), is listened to as an advisor to the top brass of the Armed Forces, with trusted and devoted friends in the judiciary».

Gelli himself, commenting on the presence of numerous P2 members in the committees of experts that dealt with the kidnapping of Aldo Moro (March–May 1978), stated that the presence of a large number of lodge members in these committees was due to the fact that at the time many prominent personalities were members, so it was natural that several of them would be found in these committees. Gelli claimed that the members were not normally aware of the identity of the other members, but that the existence of the P2 Lodge was well known, having also been discussed in several interviews well before the list was discovered.

Hypotheses were made about who the occult head of the organisation could be, Roberto Calvi's widow declared that Giulio Andreotti was the real head of the lodge, while the role of vice-president was supposedly held by Francesco Cosentino (who was registered on the P2 list with membership card number 1618): however, no reliable evidence has ever been found to confirm this statement. Nara Lazzerini, for many years Licio Gelli's secretary and lover, also stated in 1981 and 1995 before magistrates that it was said in the lodge that the real boss was Giulio Andreotti:

Gelli told me that among the members of his Masonic Lodge P2 was the Honourable Mr Andreotti [...]. I remember that in the P2 environment it was said that the real boss was Andreotti and not Gelli. I remember, in particular, that during a lunch in Florence, William Rosati and Ezio Giunchiglia told me that the real manoeuvring force was Andreotti and that they did everything with Andreotti [...].

— Nara Lazzerini to Palermo magistrates Gioacchino Natoli and Roberto Scarpinato on 4 September 1995

Rosati and Giunchiglia were two regional leaders of Lodge P2: the first was the manager of a private clinic and head of the P2 group for Liguria with sympathies for the extreme right (membership card no. 1906, died in 1984); the second official of the Ministry of Defence (card no. 1508) for the provinces of Pisa and Livorno. Daffodil during the trial Gelli più 622 was defined by PM Elisabetta Cesqui as a character who was "in the area of greatest shadow of P2, between the side of contacts with the US military and intelligence environments and the one that leads back to the arms trade." During the trial for the massacre in Bologna, Lia Bronzi Donati, Grand Master of the traditional female Masonic lodge (and the most important, and perhaps the only, female figure in the Masonic world at the time), told the magistrates who were questioning her as a witness that the list of P2 members consisted of at least 6,000 names and that Andreotti was the presence above the P2 Lodge": this information was confided to him by William Rosati "who became the moral reference of P2 after the seizure of the lists".

Andreotti, for his part, had always denied knowing Gelli, until the publication of the aforementioned photo of Buenos Aires. Licio Gelli, for whom the judiciary issued an arrest warrant on 22 May 1981 for violation of art. 257 of the penal code (political or military espionage), temporarily took refuge in Uruguay.

=== Notable people on Gelli's list ===
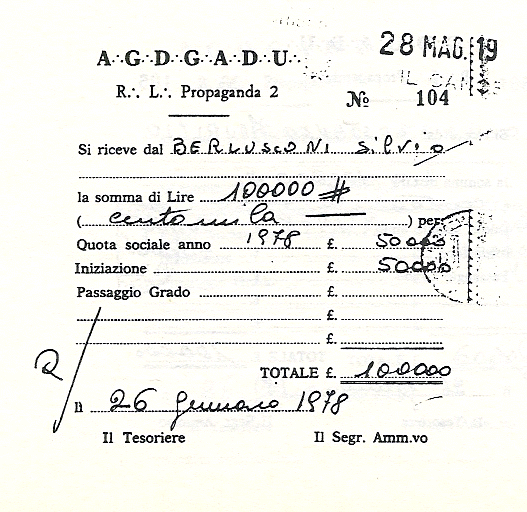
Receipt for membership of Silvio Berlusconi in the P2 masonic lodge

Notable individuals include:

- General Aldo Alasia (Argentina).
- Federico Carlos Barttfeld (Argentina), ambassador of Argentina to Yugoslavia (1991–1995) and China (1998–2001), and later under-secretary of state in Néstor Kirchner's government, relieved of his functions in 2003 following allegations of involvement in the Dirty War.
- Silvio Berlusconi, businessman, future founder of the Forza Italia political party and Prime Minister of Italy, who explicitly confirmed his membership. According to Gelli, Berlusconi was "the only charismatic figure who can truly lead" Italy.
- General Luis Betti (Argentina), Chief of the Joint Chiefs of Staff (1973–1974).
- Admiral Gino Birindelli, Commander in Chief Naval Fleet in the Italian Navy from 1969, and a member of the Chamber of Deputies for the neo-Fascist Italian Social Movement (MSI) in 1972–1976.
- Brunetto Bucciarelli-Ducci, former president of the Chamber of Deputies (1963–1968) and judge.
- Roberto Calvi, known as "God's banker", chairman of Banco Ambrosiano from 1975, was allegedly killed by the Mafia in London in 1982.
- Vincenzo Carollo, politician of the Christian Democratic Party (DC), President of Sicily 1967–1969 and member of the Senate of the Republic 1972–1987.
- Fabrizio Cicchitto, member of the Italian Socialist Party, who later joined Berlusconi's centre-right party Forza Italia.
- Maurizio Costanzo, popular television talk show host of Mediaset programmes in Berlusconi's commercial television network.
- Federico Umberto D'Amato, leader of the Office for Reserved Affairs (Ufficio affari riservati), an intelligence cell in the Italian Ministry of the Interior.
- César Augusto de la Vega (Argentina), Secretary of State for Minors and the Family in the Ministry of Social Welfare (1973–1974), while it was headed by his friend José López Rega (see below); ambassador of Argentina to UNESCO (1974), France (1974–1975) and Denmark (1975–1976).
- Stefano Delle Chiaie, Italian neo-fascist terrorist who had ties with Operation Condor and the regime of Luis García Meza Tejada in Bolivia.
- Franco Di Bella, director of Corriere della Sera. Di Bella had commissioned a long interview with Gelli, who openly talked of his plans for a "democratic renaissance" in Italy—including control over the media. The interview was carried out by the television talk show host Maurizio Costanzo, who would also be exposed as a member of P2 (see above).
- Franco Foschi, politician of the Christian Democratic Party (DC), Minister of Labour and Social Security (1980).
- Artemio Franchi, president of the Italian Football Federation (FIGC) (1967–1976, 1978–1980), president of UEFA (1973–1983) and member of the executive committee of FIFA (1974–1983).
- General Orazio Giannini, commander of the Guardia di Finanza (1980–1981). On the day the list was discovered, Giannini phoned the official in charge of the operation, and told him (according to the official's testimony to the parliamentary commission): "You better know that you've found some lists. I'm in those lists – be careful, because so too are all the highest echelons [Breda understood 'of the state']. ... Watch out, the Force will be overwhelmed by this."
- General Raffaele Giudice, commander of the Guardia di Finanza (1974–1978). Appointed by Giulio Andreotti, Giudice conspired with oil magnate Bruno Musselli and others in a lucrative tax fraud of as much as $2.2 billion.
- General Giulio Grassini, head of Italy's civilian secret service SISDE (1977–1981).
- Raúl Alberto Lastiri (Argentina), interim president of Argentina from 13 July 1973 until 12 October 1973.
- Pietro Longo, secretary of the Italian Democratic Socialist Party (PSDI) (1978–1985) and Minister of Budget in Bettino Craxi's first cabinet (1983–1984).
- José López Rega, Argentine Minister of Social Welfare under Juan Perón and Isabel Perón (1973–1975) and ambassador of Argentina to Spain (1975–1976), founder of the Argentine Anticommunist Alliance ("Triple A").
- Enrico Manca, editor of Giornale Radio Rai and Minister of Foreign Trade (1980–1981).
- Luigi Mariotti, a politician of the Christian Democratic Party (DC), Minister of Health (1964–1968, 1970–1972) and Minister of Transport and Civil Aviation (1968–1969).
- Emilio Massera, admiral and Commander-in-Chief of the Argentine Navy, and a member of the National Reorganization Process, the military junta ruling Argentina led by General Jorge Rafael Videla, in 1976–1978.
- General Vito Miceli, chief of the Operative Informations and Situation Service (Servizio Informazioni Operative e Situazione, SIOS), the Italian Army's intelligence service from 1969 and head of the military intelligence service SISMI/SID from 18 October 1970 to 1974. Arrested in 1975 on charges of "conspiracy against the state" concerning investigations about Rosa dei venti, a state-infiltrated group involved in the strategy of tension, he later became a member of the Italian Social Movement (MSI).
- General Pietro Musumeci, deputy director of SISMI.
- Umberto Ortolani, banker and businessman, closely involved with Gelli's business interests in South America and with the Vatican Bank.
- General Giovambattista Palumbo, commander of the 1st Carabinieri Division "Pastrengo".
- Carmine Pecorelli, a controversial journalist assassinated on 20 March 1979. In a May 1978 article, he had drawn connections between the kidnapping of Aldo Moro and Operation Gladio.
- Mario Pedini, politician of the Christian Democratic Party (DC), Minister of Scientific Research (1975–1978), Minister of Culture and Environmental Heritage (1976–1978) and Minister of Public Education and Universities (1978–1979).
- General Franco Picchiotti, commander of the 11th Carabinieri Mechanized Brigade.
- Angelo Rizzoli Jr., owner of Corriere della Sera, later a cinema producer.
- Celestino Rodrigo, Argentine Minister of Economy (1975) and friend of José López Rega (see above).
- General Giuseppe Santovito, head of Italy's military intelligence service SISMI (1978–1981).
- Gustavo Selva, director of the Rai Radio 2 news programs, at the time of the publication of Gelli's list a Member of the European Parliament for the Christian Democratic Party (DC), later a member of the Chamber of Deputies and the Senate of the Republic for the National Alliance.
- Michele Sindona, banker linked to the Sicilian Mafia, ex-president of Banca Privata Finanziaria.
- Gaetano Stammati, President of the Italian Commercial Bank (COMIT), Minister of Finance (1976) in Aldo Moro's government, Minister of Treasury (1976–1978), Minister of Public Works (1978–1979) and Minister of International Trade (1979) in Giulio Andreotti's third, fourth and fifth governments.
- General Guillermo Suárez Mason, Argentine military officer in charge of the Batallón de Inteligencia 601 during the Dirty War and Operation Condor.
- Bruno Tassan Din, general director of Corriere della Sera
- Admiral Giovanni Torrisi, Chief of Staff of the Italian Navy (1977–1980) and Chief of the Defence Staff (1980–1981).
- Alberto Vignes, Argentine Minister of Foreign Affairs and Worship (1973–1975).
- Claudio Villa, famous singer and actor who represented Italy in the Eurovision Song Contest in 1962 and 1967.
- Vittorio Emanuele, Prince of Naples, son of Umberto II and disputed head of the House of Savoy.

== Relationships with the regular Freemasonry ==
According to Giuliano Di Bernardo, former Venerable Master of the Grand Orient of Italy, "until its dissolution in 1982 due to the Anselmi-Spadolini law, [P2] was a regular lodge of the Grand Orient of Italy, as attested by extensive documentation that passed between the grand masters Gamberini, Salvini and Battelli on the one hand and Licio Gelli on the other."

=== Expulsion ===
The Grand Orient of Italy officially expelled Gelli and the P2 lodge in 1976. In 1974, it was proposed that P2 be erased from the list of lodges by the Grand Orient of Italy, and the motion carried overwhelmingly. The following year a warrant was issued by the Grand Master for a new P2 lodge. It seems the Grand Orient in 1976 had only suspended the lodge, and not actually expelled it, on Gelli's request. Gelli was found to be active in the Grand Orient's national affairs two years later, financing the election of a new Grand Master. In 1981, a Masonic tribunal decided that the 1974 vote did mean the lodge had factually ceased to exist and that Gelli's lodge had therefore been masonically and politically illegal since that time.

== Consequences and judicial investigations ==
P2 was dissolved by law, but its system of political, financial and criminal relations may have survived [...] As for Dr Berlusconi, his current interventionism is symptomatic of the reaction of a part of the old regime which, having accumulated wealth and power in the eighties, intends to continue to influence political life in the nineties as well.

— Luciano Violante, President of the Anti-Mafia Commission

The Court of Cassation decided that the Gelli case was the responsibility of the Rome Public Prosecutor's Office, from which he was accused only of fraudulent activity and false pretences. In May 1983, the case against the P2 leaders was closed. Later, Judge Gherardo Colombo declared that if the investigation had remained in Milan, "Bribesville" would have erupted a decade earlier, given the amount of information in Gelli's papers.

The Public Prosecutor's Office of Rome began proceedings against Licio Gelli and about twenty other people, accused of political conspiracy, criminal association and other crimes. After an investigation that lasted almost ten years, in October 1991, the investigating judge at the Criminal Court of Rome requested that they be sent for trial. The trial lasted a year and a half and with the sentence on 16 April 1994, filed the following 26 July, the Court pronounced a sentence of acquittal of all the accused of the crime of attacking the Constitution through political conspiracy because the fact did not exist. The appeal was rejected, and on 27 March 1996, the Court of Appeal confirmed the sentence. Although subsequent judicial inquiries have (not without receiving criticism from many quarters) partly denied the conclusions of the commission of inquiry, tending to reduce the influence of the lodge, the discovery of the P2 case made people in Italy aware of the existence, in other systems and in other countries, of lobbying, i.e. the exertion of political pressure on those in positions of power to influence the choices made in the running of the nation in a direction favourable to the lobbyists.

In 1987, Licio Gelli was sentenced to 8 years in prison by the Court of Assizes of Florence for having financed members of the Tuscan extreme right, involved in the attacks on the Florence-Bologna railway line. Two years later, on appeal, the judges declared that they did not have to proceed against the accused because, at the time of his extradition from Switzerland, political offences had been excluded. The Supreme Court ordered a new trial, stating that Gelli should have been fully acquitted. On 9 October 1991, the Court of Assizes of Appeal of Florence acquitted him with a broad formulation.

On 23 November 1995, Gelli was definitively convicted of misleading the court in the trial for the massacre in Bologna that took place on 2 August 1980, in which 85 people were killed and 200 were injured. The misdirection was carried out, in collaboration with the SISMI general Pietro Musumeci (a member of P2), the Carabinieri colonel Giuseppe Belmonte and the wheeler-dealer Francesco Pazienza, by placing a suitcase loaded with weapons, explosives, ammunition, flight tickets and false documents on the Taranto-Milan train on 13 January 1981. Gelli was also found guilty of fraud regarding the bankruptcy of Banco Ambrosiano, which was connected to the Vatican bank, the Istituto per le Opere di Religione (IOR) (there was a $1.3 billion hole in the bank).

Over time, equal attention has been paid to the fate of the piduisti, some of whom have been publicly successful in politics or entertainment, while others have returned to anonymity. Some have been freed from the social stigma (Silvio Berlusconi successfully entered politics, becoming Prime Minister four times in 15 years; Fabrizio Cicchitto returned to politics; Maurizio Costanzo made a self-defence speech and maintained his career as a journalist). Berlusconi himself declared to Iceberg (a political programme broadcast on Telelombardia): "I have never been part of P2. And in any case, according to the sentences of the Republic's courts, being a P2 member is not a demerit. [...] I read about these projects later. A set-up: P2 was a scoop that made the fortune of La Repubblica and L'Espresso, it was an exploitation that unfortunately destroyed many protagonists of the political, cultural and journalistic life of our country." Massimo D'Alema, the then Prime Minister, replied: "Being a member of the Pide means having participated in an organisation, a secret sect that plotted against the State, and this has been ratified by Parliament. An opinion that I share."

From 2007 onwards, Licio Gelli was placed under house arrest in his villa Wanda in Arezzo, to serve a 12-year sentence for the Banco Ambrosiano's bankruptcy. In an interview with la Repubblica on September 28, 2003, during the Berlusconi II government, he said:

I am enjoying a peaceful old age. Every morning I talk to the voices of my conscience, and it is a dialogue that calms me. I look at the country, I read the newspapers and I think: here it is, everything is being realised little by little, piece by piece. Maybe yes, I should have the copyright. Justice, TV, public order. I wrote it all thirty years ago in 53 points.

== Subversive programme "Plan of Democratic Rebirth" ==
It was immediately realised that the seized documents testified to the existence of an organisation that aimed to take possession of the organs of state power in Italy: the Plan for Democratic Rebirth (Piano di Rinascita Democratica), a document halfway between a manifesto and a feasibility study that was seized a few months later from Gelli's daughter, contained a sort of roadmap for the penetration of the lodge's members into key sectors of the State, indications for the start of selected proselytising and, appropriately, also a budget estimate of the costs for the acquisition of the vital functions of power: "The availability of funds not exceeding 30 or 40 billion seems sufficient to allow well-selected men of good faith to conquer the key positions necessary for their control."

The primary objectives were the reorganisation of the State under the banner of anti-communist and anti-socialist authoritarianism, accompanied by a selective and class-based approach to social structures. Among the main points of the plan was the simplification of the political panorama with the presence of two large macro-parties, bringing the magistracy under the control of the executive power, separating the careers of magistrates, overcoming the bicameral system and reducing the number of parliamentarians, abolishing the provinces, breaking the unity of the trade unions and reforming the labour market, control over the mass media, transforming the universities in Italy into foundations under private law, abolishing the legal validity of academic qualifications and adopting a repressive policy against petty crime and political opponents.

The people to be "recruited" into the parties would in exchange have to obtain "predominance" (textual) over their own organisations (in the plan it states "for the PSI, for example, Mancini, Mariani and Craxi; for the PRI: Visentini and Bandiera; for the PSDI: Orlandi and Amidei; for the DC: Andreotti, Piccoli, Forlani, Gullotti and Bisaglia; for the PLI: Cottone and Quilleri; for the Destra Nazionale (possibly): Covelli"), while the "recruited" journalists were supposed to "sympathise" with the men recommended by the Masonic lodge. Some of the politicians mentioned went on to play leading roles in their parties and in the government, but these personalities were considered "to be recruited". However, it has never been clearly established whether Gelli contacted them to pursue the aims of P2.

From the content of the Plan of Democratic Rebirth (according to the texts available on the web) there can be summarized some points of subversive reformas:

=== Urgent changes ===
- the public liability (for negligence) of magistrates of civil and penal law;
- the regulations for career access (preliminary psycho-aptitude tests).

=== About the government ===
- the "law on the Presidency of the Council and on Ministries" (Italian Constitution, art. 95) to determine responsibilities and the (reduced) number of ministers, with the elimination, or almost, of undersecretaries;
- administrative reform (in relation to articles 28, 97 and 98 of the Constitution) based on the theory of the non-administrative public act, on the clear separation of political responsibility from administrative responsibility (which becomes personal, through the institution of the Ministry's Secretary General) and on the substitution of the principle of refusal by silence with that of consent by silence;

=== Economic and social measures ===
- elimination of midweek public holidays and related long weekends (except for 2 June, Christmas, New Year and 15 August) to be awarded in the form of a lump sum of 7 additional days to the annual holiday entitlement;
- reduction of tax rates on company funds allocated to reserves, amortisation, investments and guarantees, to encourage self-financing and reward the reinvestment of profit;
- granting of heavy tax relief to foreign capital investment to facilitate the repatriation of capital from abroad;

Reform of the labour market;

- transforming universities in Italy into foundations under private law.

=== TV and press ===
- immediate establishment of an agency to coordinate the local press (to be acquired with subsequent operations over time) and cable TV to be set up in a chain so as to control the media and public opinion in the country.
- the multiplication of radio and TV networks in the name of antenna freedom (art. 21 of the Constitution), and the suppression of RAI. These broadcasters and newspapers were to be coordinated by ANSA.

=== Trade unions ===
- bring the union back to its "natural function" of "interlocutor of the productive phenomenon instead of the illegitimately assumed interlocutor in view of company and government policy decisions" the union must not get involved in politics. With this in mind, it is necessary to "limit the right to strike to economic causes and in any case ensure freedom of work";
- provide for the "restoration of individual freedom in factories and companies in general to allow the election of factory councils with effective guarantees of voting secrecy".

The first objective is linked to the issue of the insufficient definition of clear boundaries and the overlapping of powers, which weaken the State. For example:

The shift of the centres of real power from Parliament to the unions and from the Government to multinational employers, with the corresponding instruments of financial action.

The two objectives are achieved with two hypotheses:

- urging the break-up of CISL and UIL and subsequent union with the autonomous unions;
- control of internal currents: "acquire with financial instruments of equal entity the most available among the current confederals in order to overturn the balance of power within the current trimurti." Article 17 of the Workers' Statute prohibited the financing of fake unions. The last resort was "a sensational phenomenon such as the creation of a real union that would wave the flag of freedom of labour and economic protection of workers".

=== Medium and long-term measures ===
- Judicial system:
  - unity of the Public Prosecutor with the other magistrates (in the current legal system, however, the Public Prosecutor is distinct from the Judges, in accordance with the Constitution – articles 107 and 112);
  - reform of the High Council of the Judiciary, which must be accountable to the Italian Parliament (constitutional amendment);
  - reform of the judicial system to re-establish selection criteria based on merit for the promotion of magistrates, impose age limits for prosecuting functions, separate the careers of prosecutors and judges, and reduce the praetorian function to an ordinary judge (in the current legal system, however, the Public Prosecutor is distinct from the Judges, in accordance with the Constitution – articles 107 and 112);
  - reform of the High Council of the Judiciary, which must be accountable to the Italian Parliament (constitutional amendment);
  - reform of the judicial system to re-establish selection criteria based on merit for the promotion of magistrates, impose age limits for prosecuting functions, separate the careers of prosecutors and judges, and reduce the praetorian function to that of judge to that of judge.
- Government body:
  - amendment of the Constitution to establish that the prime minister is elected by the Chamber at the beginning of each legislature and can only be overthrown through the election of his successor;
- Parliament body:
  - new electoral laws, for the Chamber of Deputies, of a mixed type (both single-member and proportional) reducing the number of deputies to 450 and, for the Senate, of 2nd degree representation, regional, of economic, social and cultural interests, reducing the number of senators to 250 and increasing from 5 to 25 the number of senators for life appointed by the president, with an increase in the relative categories (former parliamentarians, former magistrates, former public officials and entrepreneurs, former military personnel, etc.);
  - pre-eminence of the Chamber of Deputies in the approval of laws; the Senate of the Regions focused on the budget law.
- other constitutional organisms:
  - Constitutional Court: sanction the subsequent incompatibility of judges with elective offices and in public bodies; sanction the prohibition of so-called active sentences (which transform the Court into a de facto legislative body);
  - Abolish the Provinces.
  - Abolish all subsidies aimed at balancing deficit budgets at the expense of the public treasury and abolish the RAI monopoly.

About the role of the press:

which should be solicited at the level of journalists through a selection that mainly touches: Corriere della Sera, Il Giorno, Il Giornale, La Stampa, Il Resto del Carlino, Il Messaggero, Il Tempo, Roma, Il Mattino, La Gazzetta del Mezzogiorno, il Giornale di Sicilia for newspapers; and for magazines: L'Europeo, L'Espresso, Panorama, Epoca, Oggi, Gente, Famiglia Cristiana. And don't forget RAI-TV.

=== Implementation ===
Although the P2 lodge was formally dissolved, many of its former members (some of whose names were not included in the published lists) continued for decades to operate and hold prominent roles in politics, the judiciary, the economy, banking systems, among others, and in cooperation with Roman Catholic bishops and high prelates who were operating in Italy in the same years. Excommunicated priest Msgr. Marcel Lefebvre suggested the existence of a Masonic Lodge in the Vatican with close relationships to other regular Masonic obediences.

The progressive implementation of the Plan of Democratic Rebirth has been detailed by some Italian media.

== See also ==
- Anti-communist mass killings
- Operation Gladio
- Strategy of tension
