= Manlio Vitale =

- Born: 22 May 1949 (age 77); Rome, Lazio, Italy
- Other names: "'Er Gnappa" (The short one)
- Known for: High ranking member of the Banda della Magliana
- Allegiance: Banda della Magliana (formerly)

Manlio Vitale (born 22 May 1949 in Rome) is an Italian criminal and high-ranking member of the Banda della Magliana, an Italian criminal organization based in the city of Rome. He is known as "Er Gnappa", which is Romanesco for "short person".

== Biography ==
Vitale began his criminal career in the early 70s under boss Tiberio Cason, specializing in armed robbery, house burglary and kidnapping. He later branched out to cocaine trafficking and became affiliated with the Banda della Magliana, in particular with the boss Gianfranco Urbani. Together with Urbani he was arrested on 18 October 1975 during a meeting at a restaurant together with the top bosses of the 'Ndrangheta at the time: Paolo De Stefano, Giuseppe Piromalli and Pasquale Condello. After being released he participated in the kidnapping of duke Massimiliano Grazioli Lante della Rovere, who was taken away on November 7, 1977, for a ransom. When the Banda della Magliana divided each neighborhood in Rome, Vitale was given control of the Ostiense-Garbatella area. After the death of Franco Giuseppucci, "Er Gnappa" was one of the many who participated in the ensuing gang war that decimated the rival Proietti Clan and several other adversaries — including his old boss Tiberio Cason, killed in 1983 on the orders of Urbani.

Having risen through the ranks he became one of the closest collaborators of top boss Enrico De Pedis, leader of the faction dubbed the "Testaccini". He diversified his activities, continuing to operate in drug trafficking but also usury and handling of stolen goods, an activity through which he met Ciro Maresca, a boss for the Nuova Famiglia and brother of the more well known Pupetta Maresca, who became one of the main Camorra allies for the "Testaccini" alongside Michele Senese. He invested money into legitimate businesses (such as car dealerships and jewelry stores), without abandoning armed robbery, for which he became one of the main organizers in Rome. Vitale has been also linked to the disappearance of Emanuela Orlandi: according to an informant she was kidnapped to blackmail the Vatican into returning money that Vitale and De Pedis had invested in the Banco Ambrosiano.

Following the conflict at the end of the 80's which led to the death of an older generation of bosses, such as De Pedis, Edoardo Toscano and Gianni Girlando, the "Testaccini" split up into two factions: one of them led by Paolo Frau, Raffaele Pernasetti and Giorgio Paradisi, and another led by Massimo Carminati, Vitale and Enrico Nicoletti. Vitale became particularly close to Carminati and together established a monopoly on the lucrative videopoker market, while continuing to invest money in legitimate businesses. Vitale even laundered the money of A.S. Roma, the city's football squad, through contacts he had with some of its players and managers. Vitale and Carminati organized, on the night of 17 July 1999, a spectacular heist at the safety vault of the bank of Rome in Piazzale Clodio: despite the vault being protected by a massive gate, a group of 23 men led by Vitale opened it by simply using the standard keys, which were given to Carminati by a group of corrupt Carabinieri officers. They opened a total of 174 safe deposit boxes which resulted not only in a loot of 10 billion, but also in the theft of several sensitive documents which were kept inside and which Carminati intended to use to blackmail authorities. Although the documents were never found, after this heist Carminati was never put under investigation again for the next decade. Pernasetti and Paradisi resented Carminati's group for not having helped them during their time in prison following the repentance of former Magliana boss Maurizio Abbatino, and for not properly sharing the revenue of their activities with them. They had planned to murder them but a new wave of arrests on 2005 foiled their plans.

Vitale was arrested again on 2 October 2010 in Caserta, where he was leading a group of Camorra and Banda della Magliana robbers to assault an armored truck. He is currently involved in the trial for the newly discovered Mafia Capitale.
