= Massimo Carminati =

Italian criminal and terrorist

- Born: 31 May 1958 (age 68); Milan, Italy
- Other names: "The Last King of Rome", il Cecato
- Occupations: Crime boss, terrorist
- Known for: Mafia Capitale investigation
- Allegiance: Banda della Magliana; Armed Revolutionary Nuclei
- Criminal charges: Mafia association, extortion, fraudulent transfer of assets, bribery, bid rigging and false invoicing (2014)
- Penalty: 20 years imprisonment (2017); reduced to 14 years and six months on appeal (2018)

Massimo Carminati (Italian pronunciation: [ˈmassimo karmiˈnaːti]; born 31 May 1958), referred by the press as one of "the kings of Rome", and in the context of the onset of the "Mafia Capitale" investigation nicknamed as il Cecato ("The Blinded One"), is an Italian underworld figure and former member of far-right terrorist group Nuclei Armati Rivoluzionari and criminal gang Banda della Magliana, which were at the centre of sensational allegations of state collusion and Masonic conspiracy during Italy's Years of Lead. Carminati was investigated for match fixing in 2012. In 2014, he was arrested with 36 others on allegations of running a corrupt network that infiltrated Rome's public administration. He was charged with fraud, money laundering, embezzlement, and the bribing of public officials. In 2017, Carminati was sentenced to 20 years in jail. In 2020, he was released due to the expiry of his pre-trial detention terms.

== Background ==
Carminati frequented a bar that was a haunt of Roman criminals and political extremists. He became a particular friend of Valerio Fioravanti, leader of the far right terrorist group Nuclei Armati Rivoluzionari ("Armed Revolutionary Nuclei", or NAR). Carminati introduced Fioravanti to some Banda della Magliana members, including their leader Franco Giuseppucci, who became a close friend of Carminati, and Massimo Sparti who later became the main witness against Fioravanti for the 1980 Bologna train station bombing. After Nuclei Armati Rivoluzionari and Banda della Magliana ceased to exist through arrests and violent death, Carminati managed to emerge as a figure in his own right.

=== Link to Perugia trial of Andreotti ===
A clandestine weapons store of the Banda della Magliana was kept in the basement of a government building; it was later found to contain grenades stolen by NAR leader Valerio Fioravanti. The NAR had access to the weapon and ammunition, which were likely to have come from the joint arms cache that was used to kill Carmine Pecorelli in 1979. In 1993, contemporaneously with his trial for Mafia association in Palermo, former Italian prime minister Giulio Andreotti, Sicilian mafia boss Gaetano Badalamenti and Carminati, were charged with the murder of Pecorelli by prosecutors in Perugia. The case was circumstantial and based on the word of Mafia turncoat Tommaso Buscetta, who had not originally mentioned the allegation about Andreotti when interviewed by Giovanni Falcone. Andreotti was acquitted along with his co-defendants in 1999. The prosecution successfully appealed the acquittal and there was a 2002 retrial, in which inconsistent verdicts saw Carminati and defendants accused of setting up the killing being acquitted, while Andreotti was found guilty of ordering the killing, and sentenced to 24 years in prison. Italians of all political allegiances denounced the conviction. The Italian supreme court finally cleared Andreotti of the murder in 2003. According to his brother, Fioravanti admitted killing Sicilian politician Piersanti Mattarella. Mattarella's death was also asserted to have been linked to former prime minister Giulio Andreotti through the Sicilian Mafia, which allegedly used its contacts with politicians Salvo Lima and the Salvo cousins to complain to Andreotti about the behaviour of Mattarella, according to Mafia turncoat (pentito) Francesco Marino Mannoia. According to the supergrass, Andreotti tried to prevent the Mafia from killing Mattarella. Fioravanti was also accused of killing for Propaganda Due.

== Later activities and imprisonment ==
Carminati lost his left eye in a gunfight with border guards in 1981 while attempting to illicitly cross into Switzerland. He was initially acquitted with Andreotti in the killing of Pecorelli, but after a prosecution appeal, they were found guilty at the re-trial stage. In 2003 Italy's highest court definitively acquitted them. He was sentenced to four years in prison for his complicity in a raid on the Banca di Roma strongroom deposit boxes, he was regarded as the mastermind behind the burglary. Police reportedly suspect the deposit boxes contained compromising material that Carminati used to compile dossiers on a number of high officials. In 2012, it was reported his name had come up in a match fixing investigation.

On 2 December 2014, Carminati was arrested by the Raggruppamento Operativo Speciale on charges of Mafia association, extortion, fraudulent transfer of assets, bribery, bid rigging and false invoicing, in the Mafia Capitale investigation. On 20 July 2017, Carminati was sentenced to 20 years in prison. On 11 September 2018, on appeal, Carminati was sentenced to 14 years and six months. On 16 June 2020, Carminati was released due to the expiry of his pre-trial detention terms.

== In popular culture ==
Carminati is the basis of the character of "Il Nero" in the book Romanzo Criminale, written in 2002 by Giancarlo De Cataldo and referring to the true events of the Banda della Magliana, the Romanzo Criminale film directed by Michele Placido in 2005 based on the same novel, ("Il Nero" is played by Riccardo Scamarcio), as well as the television series directed by Stefano Sollima and Emiliano Coltorti.

He also inspired the character of Samurai in the book Suburra by Giancarlo De Cataldo and Carlo Bonini, from which the 2015 film Suburra by Stefano Sollima was made, in which Samurai is played by Claudio Amendola; the book was also followed by the television series directed by Michele Placido, Andrea Molaioli and Giuseppe Capotondi, in which the character is played by Francesco Acquaroli.
