= Franco Giuseppucci =

Italian criminal (1947 – 1980)

- Born: 3 March 1947; Rome, Lazio, Italy
- Died: 13 September 1980 (aged 33); Rome, Lazio, Italy
- Cause of death: Murdered
- Other names: "Er Negro" (The Black One) "Er Fornaretto" (The Little Baker)
- Known for: Founder of the Banda della Magliana
- Allegiance: Banda della Magliana

Franco Giuseppucci (Italian pronunciation: [ˈfraŋko dʒuzepˈputtʃi]; 3 March 1947 – 13 September 1980) was an Italian criminal, and one of the founders and bosses of the Banda della Magliana, he was an Italian criminal organization based in the city of Rome that was particularly active throughout the late 1970s until the early 1980s.

== Early years ==
Franco Giuseppucci was born in the Trastevere district of Rome. When he was a teenager he began working at his father's bakery, and from this he gained the nickname "Er Fornaretto" (The Little Baker), however he soon left this job after his father, who was also a robber, was killed in a shootout with the Polizia di Stato. A strong fascist sympathizer, with a bust of Benito Mussolini at home, through the propagandist actions for the Italian Social Movement (MSI) Giuseppucci was able to meet up with fellow neo-fascists such as Massimo Carminati, Alessandro Alibrandi and other members of the Nuclei Armati Rivoluzionari (NAR) group that he would later involve in the criminal projects for the Banda della Magliana.

After leaving the job as a baker he soon found employment as a bouncer for a gambling house in the area of Ostia. It is here that Giuseppucci first made contact with the criminals operating in Rome at the time. Unlike other neo-fascists such as Carminati, Giuseppucci was more interested in money and wealth and thus closer in mentality to non-political criminal groups. In those years, the underworld of Rome was disorganized, with many small groups called batterie, each independent and usually containing 4-6 people, dealing mostly in gambling and some robberies. Rome was considered land of conquest for other, already well established criminal organizations such as the Camorra and Cosa Nostra. There was a group, the Marsigliesi clan, led by Albert Bergamelli and Laudavino De Sanctis, that had started gaining considerable money through kidnappings and by first introducing small-scale drug trafficking. But this was an isolated case in the otherwise bland criminal landscape of the city.

Giuseppucci in 1974 joined one of these batterie operating in the Trullo district, and since the beginning became respected for his charisma, organizational skills and resourcefulness, which soon allowed him not only to lead the group, but also to befriend several other members of other batterie and make a name for himself in the Roman underworld. Giuseppucci was also an avid gambler himself who regularly spent time at betting shops for horse racing, and used to lend the money acquired from robberies on usury, with interests ranging up to 20%/25%. This not only allowed him to "clean" the money, but also guaranteed safe and regular profits. It is in one of these betting shops that Giuseppucci met and befriended Vincenzo Casillo, lieutenant of NCO boss Raffaele Cutolo, whose group also had interests in Roman betting shops.

As Giuseppucci owned a mobile home, it became often used by the various batterie, as well as by his NAR friends, as a hiding place for their weapons, with Giuseppucci, who by now had been given a new nickname, Er Negro, due to his dark skin, keeping an eye on them. Though in 1976 this hiding place was eventually discovered by the Carabinieri who arrested Er Negro, he was released from jail after only a few months. This was only a minor setback for Giuseppucci who simply chose to store the weapons of his associates elsewhere, while continuing to expand his criminal ventures in new activities and ideas. In the same year, he participated, along with several neapolitan associates of Casillo, in the kidnapping of jeweler Roberto Giansanti: the role of Er Negro was to study the victim's habits so that the Camorristi could then carry out the kidnapping. After 52 days, during which Giansanti had become sick, the hostage was freed but the ransom obtained was only 350 million lire, a far lower amount than the originally requested 5 billions, which had to be split in multiple parts due to the number of people involved in the kidnapping.

== Banda della Magliana ==
The original core of the gang was formed almost by accident — not long after being released from jail Giuseppucci was given a stash of weapons by his friend and associate, Enrico De Pedis, another well respected criminal who ran a batteria in the Testaccio district but was at the time in jail. Giuseppucci had placed the weapons in the trunk of his car and as he was going to hide them, he stopped at a cafè to buy a snack. In the meantime another street criminal, Giovanni Tigani, better known as Paperino (Donald Duck), noticed the car with the keys left inside and, unaware of who the owner was or what the car contained, stole it. "Er Negro" immediately began searching for the car and weapons and he discovered they were given to Emilio Castelletti, a criminal working for the batteria of another notorious criminal operating in the Magliana neighborhood: Maurizio Abbatino, known as "Crispino".

Franco Giuseppucci wasted no time and immediately went looking for the car with the guns inside and on the same day, likely informed by Tigani himself, came to reclaim the weapons. This was the occasion in which we met Franco Giuseppucci who proposed to join forces, since we already knew Enrico De Pedis who was working alongside Giuseppucci, and who soon joined up with Giuseppucci. This new batteria was thus formed when Giuseppucci's group and our own decided to join forces. This was when we agreed on the obligations of solidarity and exclusive cooperation.

— Testimony of Maurizio Abbatino, 13 December 1992

The encounter between Giuseppucci, Abbatino and De Pedis thus set the stage for the formation of a new, larger batteria, much larger than most conventional groups at the time and which allowed them to no longer be confined to marginal roles in the criminal underworld. Each of them brought in the members of their own groups and slowly recruited and gathered more from others, becoming steadily larger. The organization operated under the principle of the "stecca para", which meant members obtained equal shares and lived off dividends gained from the criminal association. The largest percentage of the gains however was kept in the "cassa comune", a common fund that was needed for anything that benefited the organization, be it for purchase of weapons or drugs, corruption of state figures, and so on. If members were imprisoned, money continued to be sent to them through their families - while successful members had to keep up their criminal activities, thus remaining "crime laborers" (operai del crimine). Despite the organization being rather decentralized and allowing members to enjoy a good degree of independence, Giuseppucci virtually became the leader of the gang as he was the one to propose further operations and expansions.

The first major criminal act of the Banda della Magliana was the kidnapping of duke Massimiliano Grazioli Lante della Rovere on 7 November 1977, against a ransom. Once again it was Er Negro who set up the kidnapping by getting in touch with a friend of the duke's son, who acted as the mole inside Grazioli's family. Due to the inexperience in the kidnapping for most of the members and the difficulty in finding a safe location to keep the hostage, they asked for the help of a small gang from the Montespaccato area, who then hid the duke in the campanian countryside. The Banda della Magliana first requested 10 billions in cash to release the hostage, but over time and through negotiations the request was lowered to about 1.5 billion. On 14 February 1978, the duke's son, after following a complicated set of instructions, delivered the money to Abbatino's henchmen, but the duke was nowhere to be found. There had been in fact a setback: one of the members of the Montespaccato group had been seen unmasked by the duke, which meant the duke had to be killed to prevent them from being identified: Giuseppucci and his men did not take part in the execution but did not oppose it, and so the duke was murdered and buried somewhere in Campania. His body was never found.

Even though the duke was dead, the ransom was still obtained and ended up being far more profitable than the one obtained for the Giansanti kidnapping. Instead of spending everything, the group decided to keep the savings and instead invest in the drug trade. It is at around this time that Giuseppucci met for the first time Nicolino Selis, known as Er Sardo (because he was born in Nuoro), a close associate and godson of Raffaele Cutolo. He, too, was in control of a rather large batteria and had begun seeking to achieve the same unity between criminal groups that Er Negro was trying to achieve. Selis and his group soon joined up with Giuseppucci and the others and became the main link between the Banda della Magliana and the Nuova Camorra Organizzata, which was the first supplier of drugs for the organization.

Not wanting to limit themselves to the drug trade however, Giuseppucci ordered the assassination of Franco Nicolini, a notorious bookmaker who had an effective monopoly on the betting shops in the city. On 25 July 1978, Nicolini was gunned down as he exited the Tor di Valle Racecourse. Following this Giuseppucci assumed total control of the city's betting shops. The Banda became more and more powerful, soon taking control of virtually the entire city's drug trade and gambling operations, by either employing or killing anybody who competed, as well as establishing close links with neo-fascist terrorist groups such as Nuclei Armati Rivoluzionari and Ordine Nuovo (mostly thanks to Giuseppucci who was a fascist himself), allying themselves with Cosa Nostra's main contact in Rome Pippo Calò, with Michele Zaza and other Nuova Famiglia camorristi through Claudio Sicilia, with 'Ndrangheta families through Gianfranco Urbani, and finally, enlisting the help of several criminals of the "old guard" who were active under the Marsigliesi, most importantly the powerful boss Danilo Abbruciati who entered the gang as soon as he exited jail in 1979.

== Links to politics ==
The period in which Giuseppucci and the Banda della Magliana first rose to power was also a period in Italian history marked by political instability and violence, which is historically referred to as the Years of Lead. The Banda della Magliana over its existence left several marks in this historical period that are even now subject to debate. Neo-fascist terrorists of the NAR were heavily involved in the waves of political violence of the time, and as they were associates in crime of Giuseppucci several of the weapons the two groups used were shared. Giuseppucci, with the help of one of his most loyal men, Marcello Colafigli, eventually found a permanent and safe place for their weapons: the weapons were hidden in the basements of the Ministero della Sanita building in the EUR district by paying off the people who worked there to keep an eye on them. The discovery of the Banda's arsenal several years later in a governmental building made a scandal in Rome, and ballistic reports much later would confirm that the weapons found in the building were involved in several assassinations and massacres of the time, including the killing of Mino Pecorelli (for which a Banda della Magliana/NAR member, Massimo Carminati, was sent to trial) and the Bologna Massacre.

Giuseppucci's power and influence was not recognized in the underworld alone. Besides making friends with personalities involved in cinema and music (frequent visitors of the gambling houses he operated), he eventually was approached by the state itself. On the morning of 16 March 1978, the car of Aldo Moro, former prime minister and then president of Christian Democracy (DC, Italy's relative majority party at the time), was assaulted by a group of Brigate Rosse terrorists in Via Fani in Rome and Moro was kidnapped. The authorities immediately began seeking for where Aldo Moro was being kept, and asked for the assistance of several criminal organizations in finding the location of Moro's hideout: they asked Cosa Nostra, the Camorra, the 'Ndrangheta and the Banda della Magliana. Giuseppucci was summoned for a meeting with DC politician Flaminio Piccoli in the outskirts of Rome, who requested Er Negro's help in finding Moro as he and his group had an extensive knowledge on the city's underworld. In return, Giuseppucci and his friends would receive "adjustments" in any trials that involved their crimes. Giuseppucci, with the help of Selis, was able to locate the hideout of Moro but when he delivered the news, he was instead told that those who wanted to help Moro were no longer interested in his rescue. Moro's corpse was found in the trunk of a car in Rome on 9 May 1978.

Giuseppucci's interest in finding ways to "fix their trials" did not end with Moro, however. One of their first contact with the Italian neofascist movement Ordine Nuovo was in summer 1978 — a few months after Aldo Moro's murder — in a villa of Rieti owned by criminologist, psychiatrist and neofascist professor Aldo Semerari. Semerari originally wanted to employ the Banda della Magliana to carry out terrorist acts in Rome to help bring about a coup d'etat. The Banda della Magliana strongly refused taking part in terrorist activities, but a deal was worked out nonetheless: in exchange of financing his political activities, Aldo Semerari proposed psychiatric expertise to arrested gang members in order to help them be released. It was the first in a series of such cooperations between psychiatrists which allowed several gang members to effectively avoid any jailtime by being declared "completely unsound of mind".

== Death ==
Under Giuseppucci, the Banda della Magliana rose from being a small group of robbers to becoming a massive criminal organization that by this point effectively had a monopoly on all crime in Rome. One of the very few groups remaining who remained independent and competed with the Banda della Magliana was the Proietti Clan, an association of several brothers and cousins who had a heavy influence in Roman betting shops (they were particularly close to Franco Nicolini) and had their own (albeit small) activity of drug trafficking. Tensions between the two groups were already high and a war at one point seemed inevitable. When Nicolini was murdered and the Banda della Magliana took complete control over Roman betting shops, the Proiettis suddenly and completely lost all privileges derived from them.

On 13 September 1980, Giuseppucci was about to return home after a meeting with other members of the Banda della Magliana. As he parted with them and entered his car, he was approached by a motorbike and the passenger fired a single bullet that struck Giuseppucci. Er Negro was wounded fatally but immediately set the car in motion and drove to the nearest hospital, but once he arrived he died in the arms of the doctors just as they were about to intervene. Giuseppucci has become a legendary figure in the Roman underworld, sometimes being even referred to as the "Eighth King of Rome". Ironically it was through his own death that his dream of unifying the batterie became a reality, as their union became even stronger precisely in order to hunt down and kill those responsible for his murder. His death sparked Rome's first major gang war, which led to the Proietti clan being destroyed with several of its members killed.

== See also ==
- Romanzo Criminale
- Romanzo criminale – La serie
