= Romanzo criminale – La serie =

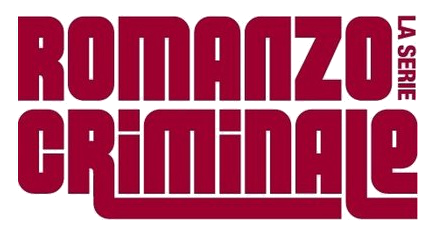
- Genre: Crime drama; Serial drama; Noir; Police procedural; Tragedy; Psychological drama; Thriller
- Screenplay by: Giancarlo De Cataldo; Leonardo Valenti; Barbara Petronio; Daniele Cesarano
- Directed by: Stefano Sollima
- Starring: Francesco Montanari; Vinicio Marchioni; Alessandro Roja; Marco Bocci; Daniela Virgilio; Andrea Sartoretti; Antonio Gerardi
- Country of origin: Italy
- Original language: Italian
- No. of seasons: 2
- No. of episodes: 22

Production
- Running time: 55-60 minutes

Original release
- Network: Sky Cinema 1 (Italy)
- Release: 10 November 2008 – 16 December 2010

Romanzo criminale – La serie (pronounced [roˈmandzo krimiˈnaːle la ˈsɛːrje]; meaning "Criminal Novel – The Series") is an Italian crime drama television series based on the novel of the same name by the judge Giancarlo De Cataldo. The series is an adaptation of the film Romanzo Criminale (2005) directed by Michele Placido. The first series quickly achieved cult status in Italy.

This is the second fiction series after Quo Vadis, Baby? that was produced by Sky and broadcast on Fox Crime, Sky One and on Sky Arts with English subtitles in 2012.

The series is partially based on Banda della Magliana, a 1970s criminal organisation active in Rome led by three friends, Libanese, Freddo and Dandi, who attempted to merge local gangs in a mafia feud like sicilian and neapolitan organisations. Their history matched with right-wing terrorism groups, the secret service, masonic lodges and financial affairs.

== See also ==
- List of Italian television series
