= Casamonica clan =

Criminal organization in Italy

- Founded: 1970
- Founded by: Casamonica family Di Silvio family
- Founding location: Abruzzo, Molise, Rome
- Years active: 1970s-present
- Territory: Rome, Roman Castles, Lazio coast, Ostia
- Ethnicity: Sinti
- Membership: 40 families with 100 members and 1000 associates
- Criminal activities: Extortion, drug trafficking, corruption, racketeering money laundering, prostitution, gamble, procurement, usury, theft, robbery, sport betting, murder
- Allies: Banda della Magliana 'Ndrangheta; Camorra
- Rivals: Proietti clan (defunct) conflicts between families

The Casamonica clan is a mafia criminal organization of Sinti origin and operating in the Rome area and present, with their ramifications, in various other areas of Lazio.

== Origins ==
The Casamonica clan originates from the Casamonica and Di Silvio families, families of Sinti originating from Abruzzo and Molise who settled in Lazio. The first members of the clan, Luciano Casamonica, Adelaide Spada, arrived in the outskirts of Rome from Tortoreto, Teramo, towards the end of the 1930s. They were joined, in the 1950s, by other members from Pescara and Venafro, a town in Molise. In the first phase the families were semi-steady and spent the winter in Rome and then migrated in the spring to Milan and Turin.

== History ==
=== Beginnings ===
At the beginning in the 1950s they were dedicated to the theft and resale of stolen goods, prostitution, theft and resale of stolen horses then they moved on to other criminal activities in the 1960s such as robberies, gambling and betting on the black market, to then flow in the 1970s into other criminal activities such as extortion, loan sharking, money laundering, arms trafficking, blackmail, drug dealing, racketeering and finally kidnappings, rapes even on commission and murders. In addition to a multitude of criminal and administrative offences such as occupation of private and public land, illegal building, etc.
Mainly the Sinti families illegally occupied the land with caravans and trailers, and then began to build illegally.
Initially they settled mainly in the southern and south-eastern area of Rome: Romanina, Anagnina, Porta Furba, Tuscolano, Spinaceto and further south, in other municipalities up to Frascati and Monte Compatri.

=== Criminal Rise ===
In its criminal rise, from the 1970s for over 30 years, the clan also clashed and intermarried with other Sinti families such as De Rosa, Di Guglielmo, Morelli, Di Silvio, Di Colombi, Di Rocco, Ciarelli, Bevilacqua, Sauchella, Spada and Spinelli to increase its criminal power and assets from criminal activities and avoid conflicts.

The rise to the conquest of the illicit traffic of Rome, occurred, starting from 1970s, with the criminal alliance of the Banda della Magliana, and lasted until the 1990s. Clan offers the Banda della Magliana criminal manpower to carry out any criminal objective, in exchange for sharing a portion of the profits and consolidating their power in the areas chosen for their criminal action. Clan helps the Banda della Magliana in eliminating the rival Proietti Clan which occurred between the end of the 1970s and the beginning of the 1980s.

The Clan consolidated enormous criminal power in the shadow of the Banda, which with the death of Enrico De Pedis saw its criminal influence in Rome reduced, inheriting its criminal business and contacts with the Camorra and the 'Ndrangheta. Through these criminal contacts, the Clan evolved and became as brazen as the old Banda della Magliana, absorbed the attitude of ostentation of luxury and criminal power typical of the Camorra and organized itself typically as a 'Ndrina, with a criminal summit centered on a prominent family head, but also with many other related families dedicated to their own criminal activities in their own area of reference, who could unite when necessary to help each other in criminal activity. The complete metamorphosis from criminal organization to mafia criminal organization took place between the 1990s and 2000s. Since the 2000s it has acquired the status of a mafia family organized as an 'Ndrina, and is treated with respect and fear by other organizations such as the Camorra and 'Ndrangheta, both allies and rivals. The various families allied with the Camorra and 'Ndrangheta provide it with drugs to sell and protection to operate in its own territory of competence, undisturbed thanks to corruption and influence. A criminal power that allows them to build undisturbed illegal villas showing off luxury, pomp and power, move huge amounts of capital especially from drug dealing and loan sharking and reinvest it in companies to take control of them, further expand their domain over the territory. In the neighborhoods and areas controlled by clan members, they also make themselves recognizable by flaunting luxury items, such as sports cars and weapons, to intimidate residents who are victims of their extortion and other criminal activities.

But in 2015, an event would forever halt the clan's criminal rise: the lavish and grotesque funeral organized by the clan for its leader, Vittorio Casamonica, complete with a horse-drawn carriage, with a helicopter for throwing of flower petals, on flight unauthorized over Rome, and finally the soundtrack from the film The Godfather, sparked outcry, outrage and indignation nationwide, among the national public, among institutions, including the highest levels of the Italian state, and among law enforcement and anti-mafia forces.

While previously the clan enjoyed minimal public exposure, if any, due to intimidation or connivance, this event has now turned a spotlight on the Clan, which has activated the Anti-Mafia Investigation Directorate (DIA). The episode caused such a stir that it also created a certain embarrassment at an international level.

The lavish funeral had also sparked some irritation among 'Ndrangheta and Mafia rival crime families, who feared massive investigative efforts by the police and the Anti-Mafia Investigative Directorate (DIA) and did not want to appear subordinate to the Clan. The Clan was described by the national media as the most powerful in Rome.

=== Decline ===
Since Vittorio Casamonica's funeral on August 21, 2015, several actions have been undertaken by the police forces and the Anti-Mafia Investigative Directorate (DIA) to disintegrate the Clan and extinguish its mafia power. Arrests, confiscations, and demolitions of sumptuous illegal villas have followed. Police operations that led to the arrest not only of members of the Clan, but also of members of other affiliated families of Sinti origin, such as the Spada and the Di Silvio, and of other allied 'Ndrine and Camorra families. The trials and sentences led to definitive sentences and the application of Article 41-bis prison regime. But their mafia power is now also being stifled by the rival 'ndrine and Camorra families, who have had very bad tolerating their rise to power. They don't want to appear subordinate and detest the outcry they've caused in Rome, their Sinti origins, and their way of operating in criminal affairs. These powerful rival crime families want these Sinti clans eradicated and disintegrated. The powerful Mafia, Ndrangheta and Camorra families want to eliminate them from Rome, Lazio, and the entire Italian territory.

== Areas of activity ==
The traditional cornerstones of the mafia clan are the areas located in the south-eastern outskirts of Rome: Romanina, Anagnina, Porta Furba, Tuscolano, Spinaceto, and further south, in other municipalities up to Frascati and Monte Compatri. But their areas of influence also extended beyond the peripheral borders of Rome, through other Sinti clans and other affiliations of their allied criminal families, in Lazio, Abruzzo and Molise.

== Members ==
The clan consisted of more than 100 active members and a thousand affiliates divided into more than 40 families.

== Historical leadership ==
=== Clan Leader ===
- 1930–1950 – Luciano Casamonica, Vittorio's uncle — deceased
- 1950–1985 – Guerino Casamonica, Vittorio's father — deceased
- 1985–2015 – Vittorio Casamonica, nicknamed "Re di Roma" (Venafro, 21 February 1950 – Rome, 19 August 2015)

== Current members ==
- Romolo Casamonica

=== Imprisoned members ===
- Enrico Casamonica (Rome, 26 May 1977) — imprisoned on 20 March 2015
- Antonio Casamonica (Rome, 10 November 1974) — imprisoned on 20 March 2015
- Consilio Casamonica (Rome, 1 May 1957) — imprisoned on 20 March 2015
- Diego Casamonica (Frascati, 11 October 1979) — imprisoned on 20 March 2015

=== Boxers and former boxers ===
- Romolo Casamonica, nicknamed "Zorba" (Rome, 23 December 1962)
- Alessandro Casamonica, known as Sandro, nicknamed "Zorba" (Rome, 3 December 1969)
- Armando Casamonica, nicknamed "La Furia del Quadraro" (Rome, 31 August 2000)

== Former members ==
=== Murdered members ===
- Raffaele Casamonica — murdered in 1972
- Enrico Casamonica, nicknamed "Ringo" — murdered in 1981

=== Deceased members ===
- Nicandro Casamonica, known as Danilo — died on 7 August 2016
- Antonio Luciano Casamonica, brother of Vittorio, nicknamed "Re di Roma" — died in February 2024
- Ferruccio Casamonica — imprisoned, died in prison on 12 March 2024
- Guerrino Casamonica, nicknamed "Pelè" — died on 6 May 2025
