= Maurizio Abbatino =

Italian crime boss, turned informant

- Born: 19 July 1954 (age 72); Rome, Lazio, Italy
- Other name: "Crispino"
- Known for: Boss of the Banda della Magliana
- Allegiance: Banda della Magliana

Maurizio Abbatino (Italian pronunciation: [mauˈrittsjo abbaˈtiːno]; born 19 July 1954) is a former Italian criminal, one of the original bosses of the Banda della Magliana, an Italian criminal organization based in the city of Rome, particularly active throughout the late 1970s until the early 1990s. He became a pentito, a collaborator with justice after his arrest in 1992.

== Early life ==
Born and raised in a street in the Magliana neighborhood, Abbatino frequented school at Palestrina (in the province of Rome), staying at the house of his paternal grandmother. Abbatino began committing crimes in the early 1970s, and in 1972 he was arrested for the first time for robbery, resistance to arrest and possession of burglar's tools. Two years later came his second arrest, this time for double murder. In the trial that followed however he was acquitted for lack of evidence and immediately released. In those years, the underworld of Rome was disorganized, with many small groups called batterie, each independent and containing usually 3-4 people, dealing mostly in gambling and robberies. Abbatino's nickname in the underworld has been Crispino, because of his curly, black hair. He had a strong passion for fast cars, and since the beginning proved himself to be a highly capable driver, so much that several batterie regularly employed him as a getaway driver in their robberies for his skills in evading the police. Skilled, but also cold and calculating, Abbatino therefore came to lead — when he was only 21 years old — his own batteria, which consisted of several people that he would later involve in the future project for the Banda della Magliana.

== Banda della Magliana ==
The Banda della Magliana was formed after a casual encounter between Crispino and another exponent of the Roman underworld, Franco Giuseppucci, known as Er Negro. Giuseppucci at the time was well known for having a mobile home in which several criminals stored their weapons. Though he stopped using the mobile home due to police investigations, he maintained this role of weapons keeper. One day, he was given a bag containing weapons belonging to his friend Enrico De Pedis, another respected criminal of the period. While moving the weapons in his car, he stopped at a cafe to buy a snack. Giovanni Tigani — better known as 'Paperino' — stole the car, with the keys still inside, unaware of who the owner was or what the car contained, but once he found the weapons he sold them immediately. "Er Negro" immediately began searching for the car and weapons and he discovered they had been sold to Emilio Castelletti, one of the criminals working for Abbatino.

Franco Giuseppucci wasted no time and immediately went looking for the car with the guns inside and on the same day, likely informed by Tigani himself, came to reclaim the weapons. This was the occasion in which we met Franco Giuseppucci who proposed to join forces, since we already knew Enrico De Pedis who was working alongside Giuseppucci, and who soon joined up with Giuseppucci. This new batteria was thus formed when Giuseppucci's group and our own decided to join forces. This was when we agreed on the obligations of solidarity and exclusive cooperation.

— Testimony of Maurizio Abbatino, 13 December 1992

The encounter between Giuseppucci, Abbatino and De Pedis thus set the stage for the formation of a new, larger batteria, much larger than most conventional groups at the time and which allowed them to no longer be confined to marginal roles in the criminal underworld. Each of them brought in the members of their own groups and slowly recruited and gathered more from others, becoming steadily larger. For example, Giuseppucci was involved with money laundering and bookmaking, while Abbatino's crew was more practical of robberies and was intent on getting into drug trafficking. Giuseppucci virtually became the leader of the gang as he was the one to propose further operations and expansions, with Crispino being the effective second in command.

The Banda della Magliana was eager to get their hands on new and profitable illicit businesses, beginning with drug trafficking, but they lacked the effective funds to be able to launch this initiative. It was Giuseppucci who proposed to the two groups a way in which they could gain enough money to finance their future operations: the kidnapping of duke Massimiliano Grazioli Lante della Rovere, against a ransom. Giuseppucci, who had previous experience with a kidnapping, deemed him an easy target as he was wealthy but without an escort. And so, on the night of 7 November 1977, Giuseppucci and Abbatino's men moved on and ambushed the duke as he was on his way back from the countryside. Crispino personally led the operation and the duke was captured and temporarily taken to an apartment in Rome, but due to the inexperience in the kidnapping for most of the members and the difficulty in finding a safe location to keep the hostage, they asked for the help of a small gang from the Montespaccato area, who then hid the duke in the campanian countryside. The Banda della Magliana first requested 10 billion in cash to release the hostage, but over time and through negotiations the request was lowered to about 1.5 billion. On 14 February 1978 the duke's son, after following a complicated set of instructions, delivered the money to Abbatino's henchmen, but the duke was nowhere to be found. There had been in fact a setback: one of the members of the Montespaccato group had been seen unmasked by the duke, which meant the duke had to be killed to prevent them from being identified: Crispino traveled to the countryside house where the duke was being kept so he could take a picture of the prisoner to prove to the family that he was still alive, and when he was on his way back the duke was murdered by the Montespaccato members and buried somewhere in Campania. His body has never been found.

With the ransom obtained, instead of spending everything the group decided to keep the savings and instead invest in the drug trade. It is at around this time that Nicolino Selis, known as Er Sardo (because he was born in Nuoro), a close associate and godson of Raffaele Cutolo, entered the alliance of batterie — he had been trying to apply the same idea that Cutolo was applying with his NCO in Naples, but in Roman territory. Selis and his lieutenants became the main link between the Banda della Magliana and the NCO, which was the first supplier of drugs for the organization, and there was a meeting between Cutolo, Giuseppucci and Abbatino when the former was on the run to secure the alliance: in order to prove their worth, Cutolo asked them to dispose of a car in which there were the bodies of two men he had personally killed. The car, a rare model for the time, easily noticeable in the Neapolitan area, disappeared in a Roman scrapyard.

Abbatino's role in drug trafficking was overseeing distribution in the Magliana and Monteverde neighborhoods. He also became one of the main killers for the gang, alongside Edoardo Toscano, Raffaele Pernasetti, Vittorio Carnovale and others. Unlike Giuseppucci, who preferred to remain in the shadows to avoid attracting too much police attention, Crispino earned a reputation as a "man of action" and was regularly on the front lines, ever since the organization's first high-profile murder: that of Franco Nicolini, the undisputed king of the city's bookmaking. Giuseppucci and Selis ordered his assassination because they wanted to obtain total control of Rome's betting shops. On the evening of 25 July 1978, as Nicolini was exiting the Tor di Valle Racecourse and heading for the parking lot, he was ambushed by Giuseppucci's men who opened fire on him. Nicolini tried to escape, but he was blocked by Abbatino's car and finished off by Edoardo Toscano and Giovanni Piconi. Following this the Banda della Magliana became more and more powerful, soon taking control of virtually the entire city's drug trade and gambling operations, by either employing or killing anybody who competed: Abbatino personally murdered, among others, Claudio Vannicola and Angelo De Angelis, two of the city's most prominent drug traffickers at the time. Unlike Giuseppucci however, Abbatino was not interested in politics, but he did take part in a series of meetings with criminologist, psychiatrist and neofascist professor Aldo Semerari, and has been directly involved in the corruption of doctors, judges and politicians.

== Shift in leadership ==
Following the slow but steady takeover of much of Rome's underworld by the Banda, one of the very few groups remaining who remained independent and competed with the group was the Proietti Clan, an association of several brothers and cousins who had a heavy influence in Roman betting shops (they were particularly close to Franco Nicolini). When Nicolini was murdered and the Banda della Magliana took complete control over Roman betting shops, the Proietti's suddenly and completely lost all privileges derived from them. The Proietti's answer arrived on 13 September 1980 when Franco Giuseppucci was shot dead as he entered his car to return home. Giuseppucci's death came as a massive shock to the Banda della Magliana members and after an emergency meeting, it was agreed by all members that the Proietti Clan had to be exterminated, setting off Rome's first gang war.

=== War with the Proietti Clan ===
The two criminals who killed Er Negro were Maurizio Proietti, known as Er Pescetto, and Fernando Proietti known as Er Pugile. Their plan also included the elimination of Domenico Zumpano, a friend and bodyguard of Giuseppucci who however they could not locate. Their suspicious actions caught the attention of a nearby police patrol, who stopped them and arrested them after they noticed they were carrying firearms. This had the side effect of temporarily shielding the two from the revenge of the Banda della Magliana, which instead decided to take it out on Enrico Proietti, known as Er Cane, who was a cousin of the two killers but was not involved with the assassination. On 27 October 1980 Er Cane was approached by a car, from which Crispino and his men opened fire on him, but although heavily wounded Er Cane managed to flee. After several more attacks on the clan's relatives and associates, on the evening of 16 March 1981, the gang managed to track down Maurizio Er Pescetto, who had been released from jail, at his father's house in Donna Olimpia street, and it what would be one of the most infamous shootouts in the gang's history, Abbatino leads an expedition and the two chosen killers, Marcello Colafigli and Antonio Mancini reach Maurizio Proietti and his brother Mario as they were returning home with their families. In the furious shootout that ensued Er Pescetto was shot to death and his brother Mario though wounded was able to escape. What the gang did not predict is that a police unit was by coincidence present near the area and immediately called in for reinforcements once they heard the gunshots. Crispino and the rest of his men had to escape to avoid being detected and the two shooters had a stand-off with the police in which they were both wounded, but eventually surrendered and were arrested. Finally, the war with the Proietti Clan ended when, on 30 June 1982, the second of Giuseppucci's killers, Fernando Er Pugile, was ambushed and shot to death in his car by Edoardo Toscano.

The war with the Proietti marked a period of strong aggregation in the Banda della Magliana, and although the botched attack of Donna Olimpia street brought about a lot of police attention, the Banda della Magliana was able to conquer the few remaining territories and assets that were not yet under their control.

=== Internal Divisions ===
After the death of Giuseppucci, Abbatino emerged as the most capable and determined leader of the organization, but his position was soon challenged. Nicolino Selis, due to his friendship with NCO Boss Raffaele Cutolo, reportedly acted as if he was the leader of the whole group: he began pretending more money for himself and his group, started recruiting criminals in jail to be only loyal to him and even began organizing drug shipments without informing the rest of the gang. He even went so far as to order the death of Danilo Abbruciati on behalf of Selis. The rest of the Banda della Magliana began seeing Selis as more of a puppet in the hands of the NCO rather than one of their own, and so they secretly sided with Abbruciati. Selis exited the psychiatric hospital he was put in after a false psychiatric evaluation on 3 February 1981, and disappeared after he was led to an appointment by Abbatino and his men. Selis' body has never been found. That same night, Selis' right-hand man, Antonio Leccese, was shot dead as he returned home. More of Selis' lieutenants would later be killed in the following periods, which coupled with the murder of Vincenzo Casillo on 29 January 1983, ended the NCO's presence in Rome. One of the few who survived was Fulvio Lucioli, Selis' personal driver who would later become the first "pentito" of the Banda della Magliana.

At around the same time, another fracture occurred within the gang. The group known as "i Testaccini", so called because most of them were from and operated in the Testaccio neighborhood, represented by Danilo Abbruciati and Enrico De Pedis, gradually distanced themselves from the rest of the gang. They began investing money in real estate and construction firms, became very close to the Sicilian Mafia (in particular Pippo Calò) and several entrepreneurs who were suspected of being linked to the Mafia such as Flavio Carboni. The Testaccini, more so than the rest of the gang, benefited from protection and collusion of important personalities, and many of their members were often able to entirely avoid jail time. The division began to manifest itself after Domenico Balducci, a usurer and entrepreneur as well as a member of the gang, was killed by members of the Testaccini on 16 October 1981, on the orders of Pippo Calò and Danilo Abbruciati. Abbatino's group, referred to as "i Maglianesi" was not informed of the decision to kill Balducci and they requested an immediate meeting with the Testaccini. There, Abbatino and his men accused the Testaccini of being traitors, exploiting the entire organization for their own goals and putting the security of its members at risk for the sake of pleasing the Sicilian Mafia, while not adequately contributing to the economic help for imprisoned members and even committing murders of high-profile criminals such as Balducci without first informing the rest of the organization. The Testaccini promised to settle everything, but by now the two groups had reached a breaking point. When Abbruciati later died under mysterious circumstances in Milan while shooting the vice-president of the Banco Ambrosiano, Roberto Rosone, an act for which again Abbatino was not informed, the Maglianesi held meetings in which they decided the Testaccini were no longer trustworthy and resolved to eliminate all of its most prominent members, even though they continued to operate alongside them in drug trafficking for the time being.

In contrast to the Testaccini which invested in legit businesses and became involved in money laundering, Abbatino's group was the one most responsible for murders and drug trafficking, activities which attracted much more police attention. Most of the members were usually arrested only for a few months at a time before being released for lack of evidence. Abbatino in particular wanted to solve the problem once and for all by faking medical documents, for which he had paid corrupt medics and he even bought a pacemaker using the gang's money to simulate a heart condition. He had almost succeeded in being granted permanent house arrest until Fulvio Lucioli, known as "Er Sorcio", decided to cooperate with authorities and Abbatino was accused of over a dozen murders, and so he was moved from the private clinic back into prison, alongside most of the high-ranking members of the organization. Amidst the increasing tensions between the Maglianesi and Testaccini, Abbatino's extended period of detention meant his role had to be temporarily filled by other people who were at the time free — such as Claudio Sicilia — and who now found Abbatino to be an inconvenient obstacle. Rumours and accusations abounded: Abbatino was accused by his men of ignoring their needs, spending the organization's money for his medical equipment while not doing enough to help those who had gotten in trouble for earlier crimes. But most of all he was accused to be a traitor because Abbatino, despite having accepted the plan to eliminate the Testaccini, spoke in favor of Enrico De Pedis due to their long-standing friendship. De Pedis was instead hated by Marcello Colafigli and Edoardo Toscano, two other high-ranking members of the Maglianesi.

=== Escape to South America ===
Abbatino tried again and again to obtain house arrest, feigning cancer and leg paralysis, managing to get himself hospitalized into a private clinic whose owners he had bribed off, when another high-ranking member of the gang decided to turn informant: Claudio Sicilia. Unlike Lucioli who had been a low level member, Sicilia was the main organizer of drug shipments and revealed much more than Lucioli: one of the first things he revealed was that Abbatino was in fact perfectly healthy and was only simulating an illness to obtain house arrest. Realizing that prison was now inevitable and that he would likely have gotten caught in the clash between the two now rival groups, Abbatino decided to flee Italy. Due to his supposed leg paralysis, the police officers who monitored him did not believe he was capable of moving and so did not pay him too much attention. On the night of 20 December 1986 Abbatino manages to escape the clinic by tying together the sheets of the hospital's beds and rappelling down the window. With the help of his brother Roberto and a few accomplices he managed to reach Switzerland, from where he took an airplane to Venezuela.

While Abbatino was in hiding, back in Rome in two very surprising verdicts the tribunals dismissed the declarations of both Lucioli and Sicilia. The first one, Sicilia, was dismissed only ten days after the beginning of the trial by judge Antonio Pelaggi (who was later found to have been a close friend of Enrico Nicoletti, one of the leaders of the Testaccini). Sicilia would be released years later without state protection, killed by hitmen of the Banda della Magliana. Two years later in 1988, a court presided by judge Corrado Carnevale — known as "l'ammazzasentenze" (the verdict killer) because of the high number of convictions of Mafiosi overturned on appeal at the Maxi Trial for the slightest technicality, such as the lack of a rubber stamp on a document — completely overturned the convictions for the Lucioli trial, deeming Lucioli to be "insane" and his revelations "completely unreliable". In both cases the tribunal ruled that the Banda della Magliana did not actually exist. When all of the gang members went free, war finally broke out between the Maglianesi and Testaccini: between 1989 and 1991 several high-ranking members of the organization were killed, most notably Edoardo Toscano and Enrico De Pedis, the leaders of each faction.

On 15 March 1991, Roberto Abbatino disappeared without a trace after leaving his house. His body was found three days later floating in the Tiber river: he had been kidnapped and tortured for days with a knife as evidenced by the stab wounds on his body. His killers wanted to find out where Maurizio Abbatino was hiding, but despite the enormous suffering, Roberto did not reveal the location of his brother, and was thus killed and dumped at the river. Roberto Abbatino was not involved in criminal activities. Abbatino's father had previously been threatened into revealing the location of his son.

== Arrest and turncoat ==
Maurizio Abbatino, the only founding member of the Banda della Magliana to be still alive, was arrested, after 6 years on the run, on 24 January 1992 in Caracas, Venezuela, as he was leaving a pub. The police were able to track him down when on New Year's Eve, he made a phone call back home to talk to his family. Abbatino later admitted that he was fully aware he would have been traced by making that phone call. Immediately following his arrest he announced he would cooperate with Italian authorities. After being sent back to Rome via airplane he was immediately admitted into the witness protection program and sent to a secure location. Following his revelations to the magistrates, which were similar and which rehabilitated the ones made years before by Fulvio Lucioli and the defunct Claudio Sicilia, on 16 April 1993 a giant police operation, dubbed Operazione Colosseo, involving more than 500 police officers, ended with the arrest of over a hundred members and associates of the Banda della Magliana. The trial against the organization began in 1995 and ended one year later. This time, the tribunal recognized the existence of the criminal association: the judges considered it to be a Mafia association on the same level as the Camorra, Cosa Nostra and 'Ndrangheta, and asked for several life sentences. This particular judgement was later overturned on appeal, resulting in much lighter sentences for many of its members, particularly those involved in money laundering and similar activities. Despite this, the trial is generally considered to have marked the end of the Banda della Magliana.

Abbatino testified at other trials, including the trials for the murder of Duke Grazioli and the journalist Mino Pecorelli. He was given a new identity and lives in a secret location. In March 2016, however, state protection was taken away from him.
