= Manlio =

Manlio is a given name. Notable people with the given name include:

- Manlio Argueta (born 1935), Salvadoran writer, critic and novelist
- Manlio Bacigalupo (1908–1977), Italian football player and manager
- Manlio De Angelis (1935–2017), Italian actor and voice actor
- Manlio Di Stefano (born 1981), Italian politician
- Manlio Fabio Beltrones (born 1952), Mexican economist and politician
- Manlio Brosio (1897–1980), Italian lawyer, diplomat and politician
- Manlio Graziano, Italian geopolitician
- Manlio Legat (1889–1915), Italian track and field athlete
- Manlio Martinelli (1884–1974), Italian painter
- Manlio Morgagni (1879–1943), Italian journalist and politician
- Manlio Pastorini (1879–1942), Italian gymnast
- Manlio Rho (1901–1957), Italian painter
- Manlio Rocchetti (1943–2017), Italian makeup artist
- Manlio Di Rosa (1914–1989), Italian fencer
- Manlio Sgalambro (1924–2014), Italian philosopher and writer
- Manlio Simonetti (1926–2017), Italian biblical scholar
- Manlio Vinciguerra (born 1976), Italian scientist
- Manlio Vitale (born 1949), Italian criminal
