= Angelo Dell'Acqua =

Italian cardinal (1903–1972)

His Eminence Angelo Dell'Acqua O.SS.C.A.
- Vicar General for Rome; Archpriest of the Lateran Basilica
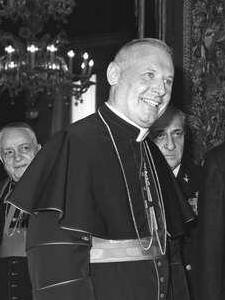
- Church: Roman Catholic Church
- Appointed: 13 January 1968
- Term ended: 27 August 1972
- Predecessor: Luigi Traglia
- Successor: Ugo Poletti
- Other posts: Cardinal-Priest of Santi Ambrogio e Carlo (1967–72); Apostolic Administrator of Ostia (1968–72); Grand Chancellor of the Pontifical Lateran University (1968–72)
- Previous posts: Rector of Romanian Pontifical College (1937–38); Substitute for General Affairs (1953–67); Titular Archbishop of Chalcedon (1958–67); President of the Pontifical Commission for Sacred Archaeology (1967–69); President of the Prefecture for the Economic Affairs of the Holy See (1967–1968)

Orders
- Ordination: 9 May 1928 by Eugenio Tosi
- Consecration: 27 December 1958 by Pope John XXIII
- Created cardinal: 26 June 1967 by Pope Paul VI
- Rank: Cardinal-Priest

Personal details
- Born: Angelo Dell'Acqua; 9 December 1903 Milan, Kingdom of Italy
- Died: 27 August 1972 (aged 68) Rosary Basilica, Lourdes, France
- Education: Pontifical Gregorian University
- Motto: Tamquam acqua decurrens
- Coat of arms

Styles of Angelo Dell'Acqua
- Reference style: His Eminence
- Spoken style: Your Eminence
- Informal style: Cardinal
- See: Rome (vicariate)

Angelo Dell'Acqua (9 December 1903 – 27 August 1972) was an Italian cardinal of the Roman Catholic Church who served as vicar general of Rome from 1968-1972, and was elevated to the cardinalate in 1967.

== Biography ==
Dell'Acqua was born in Milan to Giovanni Dell'Acqua and his wife Giuseppina Varalli. He studied at the seminaries in Monza and Milan (obtaining a doctorate in theology from the latter), and the Pontifical Gregorian University in Rome, from where he earned a doctorate in canon law. After receiving the diaconate on 19 December 1925, Dell'Aqua was ordained a priest by Eugenio Cardinal Tosi on 9 May 1926. He undertook pastoral ministry in Milan and was private secretary to its archbishop from 1928 to 1929. After finishing his studies in 1931, he was raised to the rank of privy chamberlain of his holiness on 19 December of that same year. Dell'Acqua was secretary of the apostolic delegation to Turkey and Greece from 1931 to 1935. He then worked as rector of the Romanian Pontifical College until 1938, during which time he was named a domestic prelate of his holiness on 15 June 1936.

In 1938, Dell'Acqua entered the Roman Curia, as a staff member of the Secretariat of State, whilst performing pastoral work in Rome until 1950. During this time, he sowed skepticism over reports of the mass-murder of Jews in the Holocaust sent by Ukrainian Greek Catholic Archbishop Andrey Sheptytsky, claiming that Jews "easily exaggerate" and that "Orientals" (that is, Eastern Catholics) "are really not an example of honesty".

He was later made adjunct undersecretary of the Sacred Congregation of Extraordinary Ecclesiastical Affairs (28 August 1950). On 1 November 1954, he succeeded Archbishop Giovanni Battista Montini, who was named Archbishop of Milan on the same day, as substitute of the Secretariat of State.

On 14 December 1958, Dell'Acqua was appointed Titular Archbishop of Chalcedon by Pope John XXIII. He received his episcopal consecration on the following 27 December from Pope John, with Bishops Girolamo Bortignon, O.F.M. Cap., and Gioacchino Muccin serving as co-consecrators. From 1962 to 1965, Dell'Acqua attended the Second Vatican Council.

Pope Paul VI created him cardinal-priest of Ss. Ambrogio e Carlo in the consistory of 26 June 1967, in advance of Dell'Acqua's appointment as the first president of the Prefecture for the Economic Affairs of the Holy See on 23 September of that same year. Cardinal Dell'Acqua was named vicar general of Rome and thus the person in charge of the pastoral care of the diocese on behalf of the Bishop of Rome, and represented Paul VI at the funeral of Senator Robert Kennedy on 8 June 1968. Cardinal Dell'Acqua received honorary doctorates from Loyola University, University of Chicago and Fordham University that same year. He was also a close friend of Cardinal Giacomo Lercaro.

Dell'Acqua died from a sudden heart attack at the entrance of the Rosary Basilica during a pilgrimage to Lourdes, at age 68. Initially buried in his family's tomb at the Sesto Calende cemetery, his remains were transferred on 31 August 1997, to the parish church in Sesto Calende where he had been ordained to the priesthood.

== Trivia ==
- In 1954, then Monsignor Dell'Acqua received a phone call from an ill Pope Pius XII, who was suffering from gastric problems, and quickly called for the latter's physician, Riccardo Galeazzi-Lisi.

== Honours and awards ==
- Knight Grand Cross of the Order of Merit of the Italian Republic
- Grand Cross of the Order of Merit of the Federal Republic of Germany
- Knight Grand Cross of the Order of Prince Henry (Portugal)
- Grand Decoration of Honour in Silver with Sash for Services to the Republic of Austria

== Notes and references ==
Catholic Church titles
Position created	President of the Prefecture for the Economic Affairs of the Holy See; 23 September 1967 – 13 January 1968	Succeeded by Egidio Vagnozzi
Preceded by Benedetto Aloisi Masella	Archpriest of the Basilica of Saint John Lateran; 7 November 1970 – 27 August 1972	Succeeded by Ugo Poletti
Preceded by Luigi Traglia	Vicar General of Rome; 13 January 1968 – 27 August 1972	Succeeded by Ugo Poletti
Titulus restored	Cardinal-Priest of Santi Ambrogio e Carlo; 29 June 1967 – 27 August 1972	Succeeded by Ugo Poletti
