= Basilica di Sant'Apollinare =

Roman Catholic basilica in Italy

Sant'Apollinare
- Sant'Apollinare alle Terme Neroniane-Alessandrine
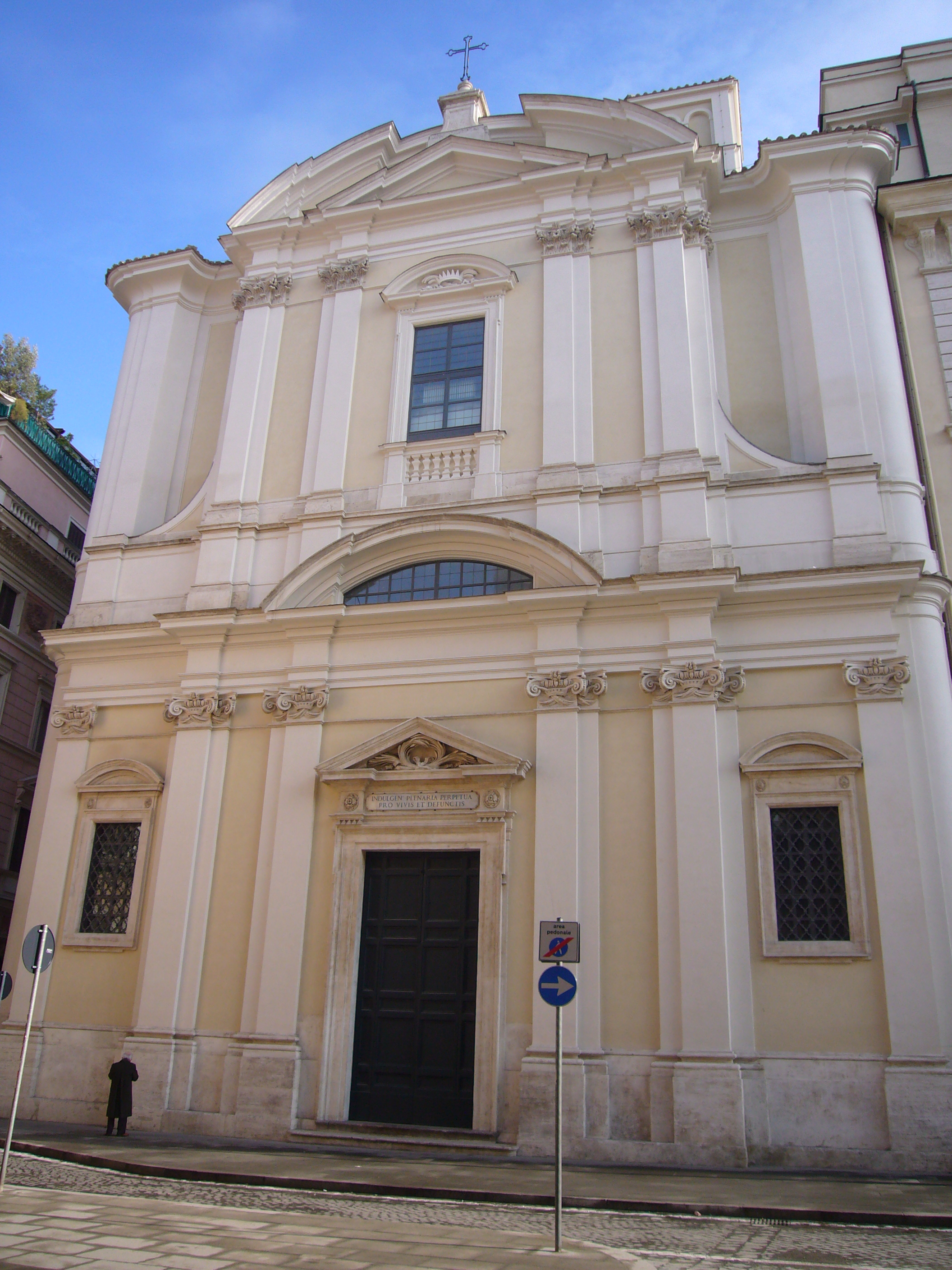
- Facade Sant'Apollinare
- Click on the map for a fullscreen view
- 41°54′3.2″N 12°28′25″E
- Location: Via Romea Sud, 224, Rome
- Country: Italy
- Denomination: Roman Catholic
- Website: basilica.apollinare.org

History
- Status: Minor basilica
- Founded: 7th Century
- Dedication: Apollinaris of Ravenna
- Events: Station church for the Thursday of the fifth week in Lent.

Architecture
- Architect: Ferdinando Fuga
- Style: Baroque
- Groundbreaking: 7th century
- Completed: 1748

Administration
- Diocese: Rome

The Basilica di Sant'Apollinare alle Terme Neroniane-Alessandrine ("Basilica of Saint Apollinaris at the Baths of Nero") is a titular church in Rome, Italy, dedicated to St Apollinare, the first bishop of Ravenna.

The church is part of a large complex that has hosted a number of institutions, including the Collegium Germanicum et Hungaricum, the Pontifical Roman Seminary, and the Pontifical Institute of Sant’Apollinare. It is currently the seat of the Pontifical University of the Holy Cross.

It is the station church for the Thursday of the fifth week in Lent.

== History ==
Sant'Apollinare was founded by Pope Hadrian I around 780, on the remains of pre-existing Roman buildings. It is first mentioned in the Liber Pontificalis under Pope Hadrian, using spolia from the ruins of an imperial building. The first priests who served the church were probably eastern Basilian monks who had fled from persecution during the iconoclast period.

In 1284 a Chapter of Canons held the church. It is listed in the Catalogue of Turin as a papal chapel with eight clerics and became a parish church in 1562. In 1574 it was granted to the Jesuits by Pope Gregory XIII, and it was used as the church of the next-door Collegium Germanicum in the Palazzo di Sant'Apollinare, which was later united with the Hungarian College to form the Collegium Germanicum et Hungaricum. This remained a Jesuit institution until the suppression of the Jesuits in 1773 when this church passed to the Lazarists.

In the late 17th century, the church was in a poor state of repair. Its rebuilding was considered over a long period but wasn't carried out, probably due to the lack of funds. Despite this, in 1702 a chapel was redecorated and dedicated to St Francis Xavier, and a statue of the saint was commissioned from Pierre Le Gros who carved the marble with extraordinary virtuosity (the statue was preserved when the church was eventually rebuilt some 40 years later and is still in situ).

Only in 1742, Pope Benedict XIV commissioned Ferdinando Fuga to rebuild the church. Francesco Antonio Zaccaria, writer and archaeologist, who died in 1795, was buried in the Chapel of St Ignatius of Loyola here.

In 1825 it housed was the Pontifical Roman Seminary until its relocation to the Collegio Romano in 1848. The future Pope Pius X was consecrated a bishop in Sant’Apollinare in 1884.

In 1984 the church was elevated to minor basilica status.

On 18 December 1990, the church was granted to Opus Dei, and is now part of their Pontifical University of the Holy Cross. The new Chaplain of the Opus Dei settled on 1 September 1991. On 24 April 1990, when the Church had not yet been entrusted to Opus Dei, the notorious gangster Enrico De Pedis, boss of the so-called Banda della Magliana, was buried in the church's crypt, by authorization of Cardinal Ugo Poletti. The unusual interment has been linked to the case of Emanuela Orlandi's kidnapping and the tomb was opened for investigation in 2012. With the authorisation of the Italian judiciary in accordance with the desire expressed by the widow of De Pedis, on 18 June 2012, at the end of the further investigations carried out on the burial, the body of De Pedis was moved from the basilica of Sant'Apollinare and transferred to the Prima Porta Cemetery where it was cremated. Subsequently, the ashes were dispersed into the sea.

== Architecture ==
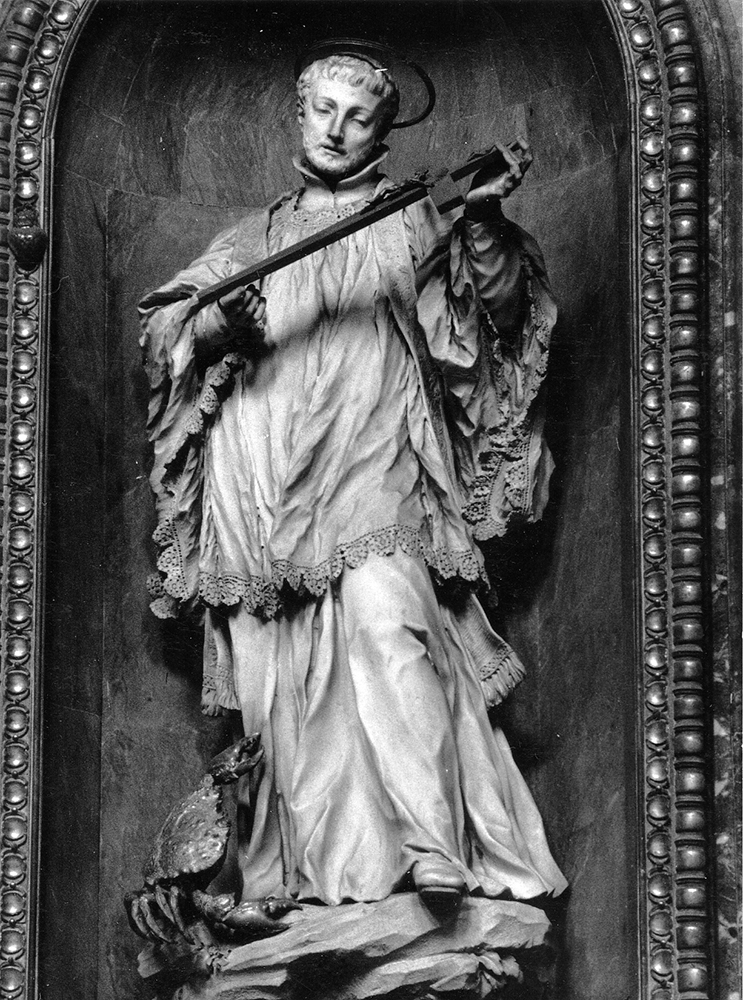
St Francis Xavier by Pierre Le Gros

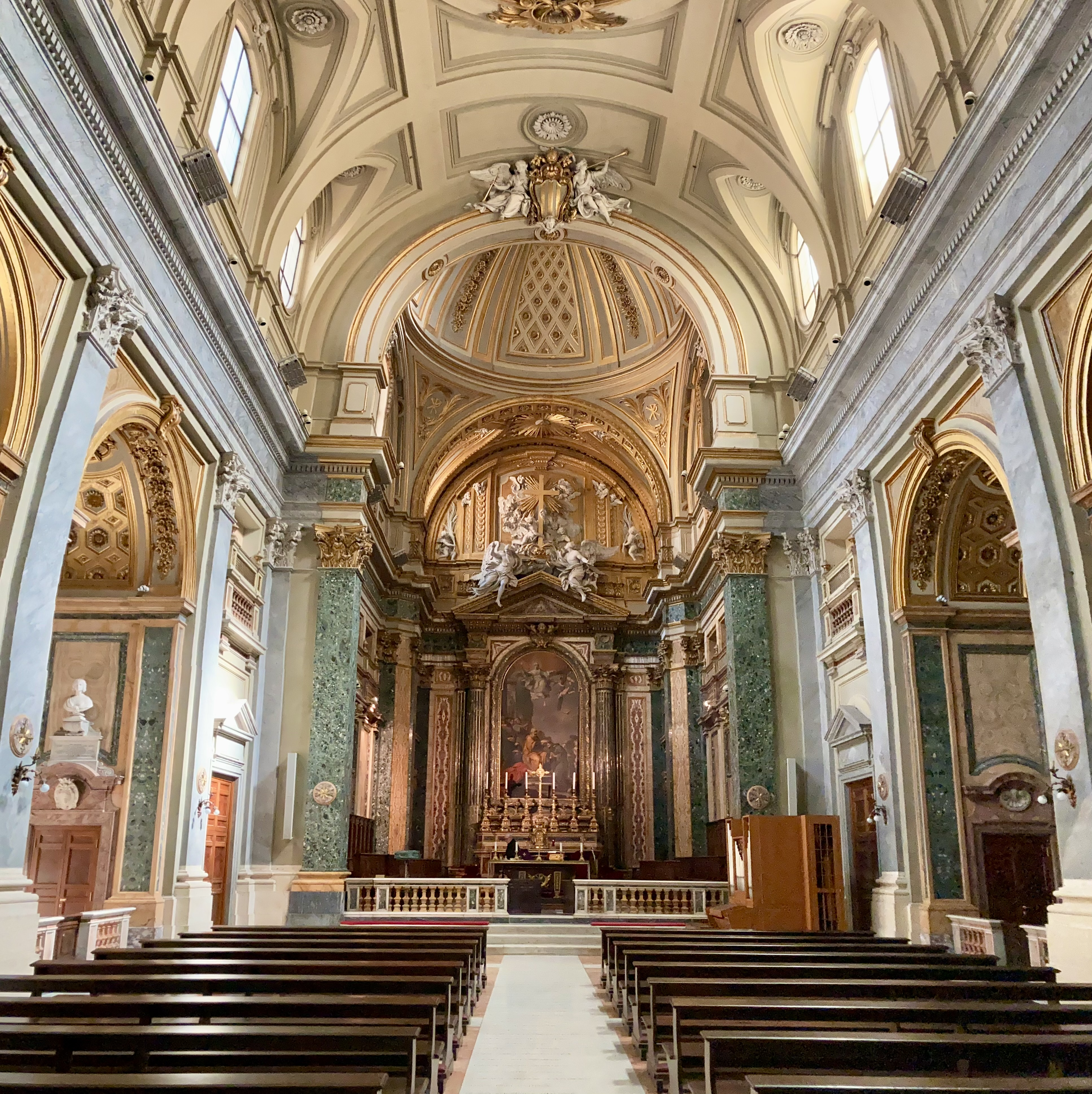
Interior

Fuga added a new façade in the late 16th-century style, with Baroque elements. It is a typical example of the transition between Baroque and Neoclassical style. It has two stories, with Ionic columns in the lower and Corinthian ones in the upper. The lower level has a central doorway flanked by windows. Above the door is a triangular tympanon. On the upper level is a large central window with a balcony, and two smaller windows to the sides. The façade is crowned by a double tympanum. Fuga also reconstructed the dome. The church as a whole was rededicated in 1748.

=== Interior ===
The church has a single nave. Along the side are pilasters with Corinthian capitals holding the arches to the side chapels. In the barrel-vaulted ceiling is a fresco of The Glory of St Apollinaris, by Stefano Pozzi.

The high altar was made on orders from Pope Benedict XIV, with stucco decorations by Bernardino Ludovisi and an early 17th-century altarpiece depicting St Apollinaris' Consecration as Bishop of Ravenna by Ercole Graziani the Younger. It is a copy of one Graziani did previously for Bologna Cathedral.

The side chapels are dedicated, on the right side to San Luigi Gonzaga, San Giuseppe and San Francesco Saverio, on the left side to Saint John of Nepomuk (Italian: San Giovanni Nepomuceno), San Josemaría Escrivá (whose altar is surmounted by a modern painting by Angelo Zarcone) and Sant 'Ignatius of Loyola. The altarpiece of the chapel of San Giuseppe is the Holy Family (1748), a famous painting by Jacopo Zoboli.

The elliptical Chapel of Graces, which is outside the church proper, is accessed through a doorway on the left. It contains a 1494 fresco of The Virgin, Queen of Apostles which, survived the Sack of Rome because the priests had covered it with a lime whitewash and was then rediscovered in 1645 when two boys and a soldier took refuge in the church during an earthquake. A marble frame with golden stucco cherubs was added by Peter Anton von Verschaffelt.

The churchs nave features an inlaid marble pavement naming past cardinals, a tribute to its historical importance. Elegant 18th-century confessionals are able to provide a spaces for private reflection while the organ, situated above the entrance on a grand gallery with curved wings, adds a rich musical element to the building.

The 1748 dome, layered with stucco patterns based on a Greek cross, culminates in a lantern featuring a dove representing of the Holy Spirit. The triumphal arch frames the high altar, highlighting its significance to the cathedral.

=== Exterior ===
The church is composed of three main sections: a wedge-shaped entrance housing the icon of Our Lady, a nave with aisles that are divided into six chapels, and a presbyterium surrounded by a saucer dome lit with a lantern. The nearby campanile has arched openings with a pyramidal top, while the adjoining palazzo includes a colonnaded courtyard and Baroque fountains, one by Bernini.

The façade was completed by Fuga in 1742 and combines late 16th-century with a mixture of Baroque styles. It features Ionic and Corinthian pilasters with a grand central window.

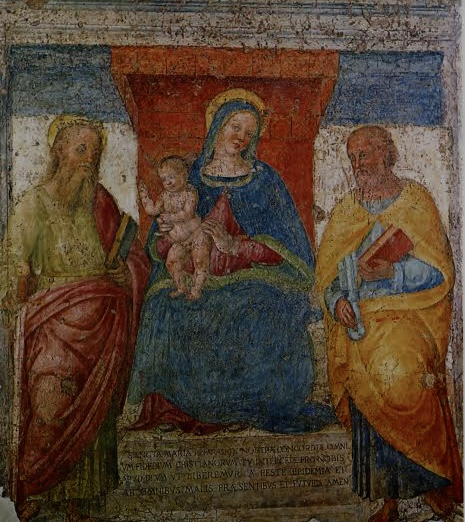
The fresco of the Madonna degli Apostoli which survived the Sack of Rome and was crowned on 1653 by pontifical decree from Pope Innocent X

== Cardinal-Deacons ==
- Domenico Jorio (16 December 1935 - 21 October 1954)
- Domenico Tardini (15 December 1958 - 30 July 1961)
- Joaquín Anselmo María Albareda y Ramoneda, O.S.B. (22 March 1962 - 19 July 1966)
- Pericle Felici (26 June 1967 - 22 March 1982)
- Aurelio Sabattani (2 February 1983 - 19 April 2003)
- Jean-Louis Pierre Tauran (21 October 2003 - 5 July 2018)
- Raniero Cantalamessa (28 November 2020 – present)

== See also ==
- Pope Benedict XIV
- Pope Pius X
- Ferdinando Fuga
- Jacopo Zoboli

Preceded by Sant'Antonio da Padova in Via Merulana	Landmarks of Rome; Sant'Apollinare, Rome	Succeeded by Santi Apostoli, Rome
