= Mafia Capitale =

- Founded: 1999
- Founder: Massimo Carminati; Salvatore Buzzi
- Years active: 1999–2014
- Territory: Rome
- Activities: Money laundering, conspiracy, racket, political corruption, corruption, bid rigging

The Mafia Capitale is the name given to an organized crime organization, and subsequent investigation, involving the government of the city of Rome, in which members stole money destined for city services and carried out other criminal activities such as racketeering, conspiracy, money laundering, illegal works, and bribery in the public administration. It operated in the city of Rome. In 2020, Italy's Supreme Court of Cassation ruled out the mafia character of the criminal acts.

== Background ==
A police investigation by Rome's chief prosecutor Giuseppe Pignatone revealed a network of corrupt relationships between some politicians and criminals in the Italian capital, which attracted international attention. It led to a request of 37 arrests.

The criminal actions took advantage of the recent influx of immigrants to Italy, gaining public contracts to manage migrant reception centres. The criminal organization also used its connections to secure lucrative public contracts, before accepting payments for substandard or, sometimes, non-existent services. Among those investigated are former mayor Gianni Alemanno and the bosses Salvatore Buzzi and Massimo Carminati, a former member of Nuclei Armati Rivoluzionari and Banda della Magliana, as well as members of the 'Ndrangheta.

A 1,200-page arrest warrant was issued in December 2014, and was followed by dozens of arrests. Among those investigated and arrested of the government of the city were the president of Rome's city council, the head of the city's public-housing division, and the former president of Ostia. On 18 December 2015, Alemanno was indicted for corruption and illicit financing. According to the accusation, Alemanno received €125,000 from the cooperatives' boss Salvatore Buzzi. On 7 February 2017, the allegation of an external cooperation in a mafia association was filed, including the allegations of corruption and illicit funding. On 20 July 2017, Carminati was sentenced to 20 years in jail, along with other various sentences of his associates. On 11 September 2018, Carminati was sentenced to 14 years and six months on appeal, with Buzzi sentenced to 18 years and four months.

== In popular culture ==
The events of the Mafia Capitale investigation are the basis for the 2015 film Suburra, as well as the 2017 TV series Suburra: Blood on Rome.
