= Ugo Poletti =

Italian cardinal (1914–1997)

His Eminence Ugo Poletti
- Vicar General of Rome
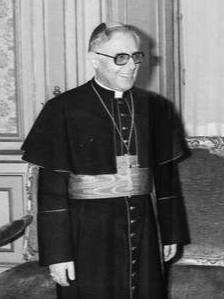
- Cardinal Poletti in 1978
- Appointed: 5 March 1973
- Term ended: 25 February 1997
- Predecessor: Angelo Dell'Acqua
- Successor: Camillo Ruini
- Other post: Archpriest of the Basilica of Santa Maria Maggiore (1991–1997)
- Previous posts: Titular Bishop of Medeli (1958–1967); Auxiliary Bishop of Novara (1958–1967); Archbishop of Spoleto (1967–1969); Titular Archbishop of Novigrad (1969–1973); Vicar General of Rome (1973–1991); Apostolic Administrator of Ostia (1973–1991); Archpriest of the basilica of St. John Lateran (1973–1991); President of the Italian Episcopal Conference (1985–1991)

Orders
- Ordination: 29 June 1938
- Consecration: 14 September 1958 by Gilla Vincenzo Gremigni
- Created cardinal: 5 March 1973 by Pope Paul VI
- Rank: Cardinal-Priest

Personal details
- Born: Ugo Poletti; 19 April 1914
- Died: 25 February 1997 (aged 82)
- Denomination: Roman Catholic
- Motto: Spes certa poli

Ugo Poletti (19 April 1914 – 25 February 1997) was an Italian cardinal of the Roman Catholic Church who served as Vicar General of Rome from 1973 to 1991, and was elevated to the cardinalate in 1973.

== Biography ==
Born in Omegna, Poletti studied at the seminary in Novara before being ordained to the priesthood on 29 June 1938. He then served as vice-rector of the theological seminary and bursar of the general diocesan seminary in Novara until 1946. After a period of pastoral work from 1946 to 1951, Poletti was made Pro-Vicar General of Novara in 1954, and on 16 June 1955 a Protonotary Apostolic.

Styles of Ugo Poletti
- Reference style: His Eminence
- Spoken style: Your Eminence
- Informal style: Cardinal
- See: Rome (vicariate)

On 12 July 1958, Poletti was appointed Auxiliary Bishop of Novara and Titular Bishop of Medeli. He received his episcopal consecration on the following 14 September from Archbishop Vincenzo Gremigni, MSC, with Bishops Mario Longo Dorni and Francesco Brustia serving as co-consecrators. Poletti attended the Second Vatican Council from 1962 to 1965, and was later named Archbishop of Spoleto on 26 June 1967. Pope Paul VI made him Titular Archbishop of Aemona and Second Vicegerent of Rome on 3 July 1969, and then Pro-Vicar General of Rome on 13 October 1972. He was also president of Pontifical Mission Aid Societies (1964–1967), a member of the Congregation for Divine Worship and the Discipline of the Sacraments, and was President of Pontifical Works and of the Liturgical Academy.

Poletti was created Cardinal-Priest of Ss. Ambrogio e Carlo by Pope Paul in the consistory of 5 March 1973, in advance of his appointment as Vicar General of Rome, and also Archpriest of the Lateran Basilica, on 26 March of that same year. As Vicar General, Poletti administered the diocese in the name of the Pope, who is the Bishop of the diocese of Rome.

One of the cardinal electors who participated in the conclaves of August and October 1978, Poletti is believed to have received up to thirty votes during a ballot of the latter conclave.

Poletti was one of the people accused on the so-called Pecorelli list, alleging membership in Freemasonry of 121 men associated with the Vatican, where he is listed with the code name “UPO”, supposedly initiated on 17 February 1969. This list was named for the Italian journalist Carmine Pecorelli (himself a member of Propaganda Due, assassinated in 1979), who published it in his journal Osservatore Politico in 1978, but it had also been published elsewhere in the newsletter Bulletin de l'Occident Chrétien' and also the magazine Panorama two years earlier. According to David Yallop, in his 1984 book In God's Name, it was because of these alleged Masonic connections that Pope John Paul I had planned on transferring Poletti as Archbishop of Florence.

From 1985 to 1991, he was President of the Italian Episcopal Conference. Upon his resignation as Cardinal Vicar on 17 January 1991, he was made Archpriest of the Liberian Basilica. In that same year, he allegedly authorized the interment of gangster Enrico De Pedis in the crypt of Sant'Apollinare alle Terme Neroniane-Alessandrine Church in Rome.

Cardinal Poletti died from a heart attack in Rome, at age 82. He is buried in the chapel of Santa Lucia in the Liberian Basilica.

Catholic Church titles
Preceded by Raffaele Radossi, OFM Conv	Archbishop of Spoleto; 26 June 1967 – 3 July 1969	Succeeded by Giuliano Agresti
Preceded by Angelo Dell'Acqua	Vicar General of Rome; 6 March 1973 – 17 January 1991	Succeeded by Camillo Ruini
Preceded by Angelo Dell'Acqua	Cardinal Priest of Ss. Ambrogio e Carlo; 5 March 1973 – 25 February 1997	Succeeded by Dionigi Tettamanzi
Preceded by Anastasio Ballestrero	President of the Italian Episcopal Conference; 1985–1991	Succeeded by Camillo Ruini
