= Riccardo Galeazzi-Lisi =

Italian physician; medical doctor to Pope Pius XII (1891–1968)

Riccardo Galeazzi-Lisi

Riccardo Galeazzi-Lisi (26 July 1891 – 29 November 1968) was an Italian medical doctor who served as Pope Pius XII's personal physician from 1939 until his dismissal in 1958. During his service in the Vatican, he was officially titled "Archiatra Pontificio". The pope also made him an honorary member of the Pontifical Academy of Sciences. He managed to be present at the 1958 death of Pius XII and created a scandal in this context with his attempt to publish pictures and stories about the dying pontiff. He was also a member of the International Society for the History of Medicine.

== Personal life ==
Born in Rome, Galeazzi-Lisi was the half-brother of the influential architect and banker Count Enrico Galeazzi-Lisi, who was instrumental in the excavations under St. Peter's Basilica.

== Controversy ==
After the death of Pius XII, Galeazzi-Lisi gave an article and photographs of the dead Pope to a French magazine, Paris Match, and to an Italian magazine. He also tried to publish a diary which he had composed of the last four days of Pius XII. In a controversial press conference, Galeazzi-Lisi described in great detail the embalming of the body of the late Pontiff. He claimed to have used the same system of oils and resins, with which the body of Jesus Christ was preserved. However, heat in the halls, where the body of the late Pope lay in state, caused chemical reactions, according to Galeazzi-Lisi, which required it to be treated twice after the original preparation. Unlike all popes before him, Pope Pius XII did not want the vital organs removed from his body, demanding that it be kept "in the same condition in which God created it".

This novelty, according to Galeazzi-Lisi, was the reason why he and Professor Oreste Nuzzi, an embalmer from Naples, used a different embalming approach, which was complicated by the intense heat in Castel Gandolfo during the embalming preparations. He predicted in the press conference that the embalming system would work to its full extent once the body had been closed in the coffin. He said that he and Professor Nuzzi treated the body of the Pontiff three times altogether.

The treatment was completely opposite to the ordinary embalming style. Instead of draining bodily fluids and keeping the cadaver cold, Galeazzi-Lisi covered the corpse with a plastic bag, inside which he placed herbs and spices. Virtually eliminating the air circulation, he dramatically accelerated the anaerobic putrefaction. According to the press, the body literally decomposed before the eyes of the mourners, during the procession from Castel Gandolfo to Rome. Despite Galeazzi-Lisi's efforts, decomposition was unstoppable: the Pope's body reportedly turned into an "emerald green" (or black, depending on the source) colour. The stench was so acrid that some Swiss Guards fainted, and had to be rotated every 15 minutes.

== Dismissal and censure ==
On 20 October 1958, the cardinals, before their conclave (not Pope John XXIII, as some claimed, since there was no pope that day) dismissed him. At the request of the assembled cardinals, he had to resign that day, 20 October 1958. He was succeeded as Archiatra Pontificio by Professor Antonio Gasbarrini, who already was a member of the medical team.

He was censured by the Italian Medical Council for unethical behaviour, a decision which he managed to undo on procedural grounds. He was also held responsible for the premature release of news of the death of Pius XII. He allegedly told waiting journalists that he would open the window of the papal bedroom as soon as the pope died. The window was later opened by an unsuspecting nun, who thus triggered the news of the death of Pius while he was still fighting for his life. For the first time in Church history, modern news media such as television were fully present and many traditional positions at Castel Gandolfo were vacant or understaffed.

Galeazzi-Lisi was never officially blamed for his embalming services, and he was never blamed by the Vatican for the medical condition of the Pope, which, as with all other Popes, was in the hands of a committee of doctors. He was punished for his indiscretion with the media and his misuse of his medical privileges. He was also banned from Vatican City for life.

In 1960, Galeazzi-Lisi attempted to dispel accusations made against him in his book Dans l'Ombre et la Lumière de Pie XII (In the Shadow and the Light of Pius XII).
