= Claudio Vitalone =

Italian judge and politician (1936–2008)

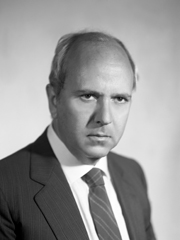

Minister of Foreign Trade
- In office June 1992 – 29 July 1992
- Prime Minister: Giuliano Amato

Personal details
- Born: 7 July 1936 Reggio Calabria
- Died: 28 December 2008 (aged 72) Rome
- Party: Christian Democracy

Claudio Vitalone (7 July 1936 – 28 December 2008) was an Italian judge and politician. In addition to serving as senator and cabinet minister, he is also known for being a close ally of the former Italian Prime Minister Giulio Andreotti.

== Early life and education ==
Vitalone was born in Reggio Calabria on 7 July 1936. He held a law degree.

== Career ==
Vitalone became a judge in 1961. He served in the Rome prosecutor's office and in the Italian senate. He was a member of the Christian Democrats (DC). He was first elected to the senate in 1979 for the DC and served there three more terms. On 6 August 1992, he resigned from the senate.

In two cabinets headed by Giulio Andreotti Vitalone was the deputy minister of foreign affairs from 1989 to 1992. He briefly served as foreign trade minister in the cabinet led by Prime Minister Giuliano Amato from June to 29 July 1992 when he resigned from office. After leaving public office he returned to his judiciary post.

== Controversy ==
Vitalone along with Andreotti was charged with ordering Mino Pecorelli's killing in Rome in 1979. In 1999, a Perugia court acquitted Vitalone and Andreotti from the charges brought against them.

== Death ==
Vitalone died on 28 December 2008 in Rome.
