= Romanzo Criminale (novel) =

Romanzo criminale is an Italian novel written by the judge Giancarlo De Cataldo and inspired by the true story of the Banda della Magliana, a criminal gang which operated in Italy in Rome between the late 1970s and mid-1980s. The novel, published by Einaudi, formed the basis for the movie of the same name (2005) directed by Michele Placido and for a TV series directed by Stefano Sollima.

Romanzo Criminale shows the intricate relationship between criminality and the State in Italy at that time, with gangs fighting for the control of drug traffic, prostitution and gambling in the different quarters of Rome. The book traces the Italian story as seen by organised crime during the Years of Lead, beginning with Aldo Moro's kidnapping.
