= Carmine Pecorelli =

Italian journalist

Pecorelli

Carmine Pecorelli (Italian pronunciation: [ˈkarmine pekoˈrɛlli]; 14 September 1928 – 20 March 1979) was an Italian journalist, shot dead in Rome a year after former prime minister Aldo Moro's 1978 kidnapping and subsequent killing. He was described as a "maverick journalist with excellent intelligence contacts". According to Pecorelli, Aldo Moro's kidnapping had been organized by a "lucid superpower" and was inspired by the "logic of Yalta". Pecorelli's name was on Licio Gelli's list of Propaganda Due (P2) masonic members, discovered in 1980 by the Italian police.

Pecorelli was killed in Rome's Prati district, with four gunshots, on 20 March 1979. Former prime minister Giulio Andreotti was tried on charges of complicity in the murder of Pecorelli but was acquitted along with his co-defendants including Gaetano Badalamenti and Massimo Carminati, in 1999. Local prosecutors successfully appealed the acquittal and there was a retrial, which in 2002 convicted Andreotti and sentenced him to 24 years imprisonment. Italy's Supreme Court of Cassation definitively acquitted Andreotti of the murder in 2003.

== Early life and education ==
Pecorelli was born in Sessano del Molise, a small municipality in the province of Isernia. During the German occupation of Italy in World War II he briefly enrolled in Junio Valerio Borghese's private fascist militia Decima Flottiglia MAS, forging contacts which would later come in handy during his career as a journalist. Later, in 1944, he joined the Polish II Corps at Oratino, near Campobasso, where he was the youngest native volunteer (barely 16 years old) in the 111th Bridge Security Company. With the Company he fought against the Germans on several occasions, most notably at the Battle of Monte Cassino in May of that year.

== Career ==
=== Osservatore Politico, Gladio and the Moro affair ===
After graduating in law, Pecorelli began practising as a bankruptcy lawyer. Described by La Repubblica as an "anti-communist but not a fascist", he soon gravitated towards the ruling Christian Democrats (Democrazia Cristiana; DC), becoming associated in particular with the party's administrative secretary, Egidio Carenini. In the early 1960s Pecorelli became Minister Fiorentino Sullo's head of press service, thereby starting his career as a journalist. Initially writing for Nuovo Mondo d'Oggi, a political journal with such a reputation for muckraking that it was closed down by the Ministry of the Interior, in 1968 Pecorelli founded his own press agency, Osservatore Politico (OP). OP later became a weekly magazine specializing in political scandals, and by the late 1970s, it had published many first-hand stories that Pecorelli was able to obtain through his numerous contacts in the government, including those in the secret services. Pecorelli publicly acknowledged that his best pieces were often those which had not been published due to agreements with the subjects involved, most of whom preferred to pay hefty sums of money to ensure his silence.

Pecorelli was able to describe with ease complex situations, often protecting facts and characters behind pseudonyms. For example, he usually referred to General Carlo Alberto dalla Chiesa in the pages of OP as 'General Amen', explaining that it was he who, in the weeks following Aldo Moro's kidnapping by the Red Brigades (Brigate Rosse; BR) in March 1978, had informed Interior Minister Francesco Cossiga of the location of the hideout where Moro was being detained. Pecorelli wrote that Dalla Chiesa was in danger and would be assassinated. Dalla Chiesa was murdered four years later, in September 1982.

Pecorelli published many confidential documents relating to the Moro Affair throughout 1978 and early 1979, such as the letters Moro wrote to his family while in captivity (known as his 'testimonial'). In a cryptic article published in May 1978, Pecorelli drew a connection between Operation Gladio (NATO's 'stay-behind' anti-communist organization, whose existence was publicly acknowledged by Prime Minister Giulio Andreotti in October 1990) and Moro's death. It has since been established that, while being interrogated by the BR, Moro made several references to "NATO's anti-guerrilla activities".

=== The Pecorelli list: Freemasonry and the Vatican ===
Osservatore Politico, September 1978 edition, La Gran Loggia Vaticana.

In the weekly publication he edited, Osservatore Politico, on 12 September 1978, Pecorelli released an edition entitled La Gran Loggia Vaticana (The Vatican Grand Lodge). Within this he published a list of 121 names of Vatican personnel, including prominent Cardinals, Bishops, priests and laymen supposedly belonging to Freemasonry. The implication was that there had been a Masonic infiltration of key positions in the Vatican.

Each entry on the list included a supposed membership number and an alleged Masonic code name. Some of the most prominent individuals listed included Cardinals Jean-Marie Villot, Sebastiano Baggio, Agostino Casaroli, Augustin Bea, Leo Joseph Suenens, Ugo Poletti, Salvatore Pappalardo and Michele Pellegrino, Archbishops Annibale Bugnini, Luigi Dadaglio and Pasquale Macchi, Bishop Paul Marcinkus (President of the Vatican Bank) and Mons. Virgilio Noè Although called popularly the “Pecorelli list” and mostly featuring the names of Italian clergymen, the origin of the list was first found in the French publication Bulletin de l'Occident Chrétien Nr.12, published in July 1976 in an article authored by Pierre Fautrad a Fye. This list was subsequently published on 10 August 1976 in Panorama, an Italian magazine, before it was picked up two years later by Pecorelli.

Regardless, the list has been reprinted numerous times, particularly in traditionalist Catholic circles, as supposed evidence to “prove” a Masonic compromise of the Vatican. Some of these themes were reconsidered by British journalist, David Yallop for his 1984 work, In God's Name, featuring a conspiracy theory about John Paul I's death. This list itself was published a mere 16 days before the death of John Paul I, and according to his sister, Rosita Pecorelli, the dossier with a list of names was given to the Pope about the "unfaithful" figures in the Vatican, just before his mysterious death and that the Pope in Rome was planning to take action against the names provided. Some traditionalists such as Roberto de Mattei, while being open to the idea of Masonic infiltration, have encouraged a cautious approach to the Pecorelli list, given that Pecorelli was himself a P2 Lodge member and could have been "spreading disinformation or documents that are both true and false" to "muddy the waters".

== Death ==
Pecorelli's dead body in his Citroën CX

Pecorelli was killed in Rome's Prati district with four gunshots, on 20 March 1979. The bullets used to kill him were of the Gevelot brand, a peculiarly rare type of bullet not easily found in gun markets, either legal or clandestine. The same type of bullet was later found in the Banda della Magliana's weapon stock, concealed in the Health Ministry's basement. Investigations targeted Massimo Carminati, a member of the far-right organization Nuclei Armati Rivoluzionari (NAR) and of the Banda della Magliana, the head of Propaganda Due, Licio Gelli, Antonio Viezzer, Cristiano Fioravanti and Valerio Fioravanti.

On 6 April 1993, Mafia turncoat Tommaso Buscetta told Palermo prosecutors that he had learnt from his boss Gaetano Badalamenti that Pecorelli's murder had been carried out on behalf of Giulio Andreotti. The Salvo cousins, two powerful Sicilian politicians with deep ties to local Mafia families, were also involved in the murder. Andreotti was allegedly afraid that Pecorelli was about to publish information that could have destroyed his political career. Among the information was the complete memorial of Aldo Moro, which would be published only in 1990 and which Pecorelli had shown to General Carlo Alberto dalla Chiesa before his death.

Following these revelations, Andreotti was tried in Perugia in 1999 alongside Badalamenti, Carminati, Claudio Vitalone and others on charges of complicity in Pecorelli's murder. The case was circumstantial and based on the word of Buscetta, who had not originally mentioned the allegation about Andreotti when interviewed by Giovanni Falcone in 1984 and had recanted it by the time of the trial. As a result, Andreotti was acquitted along with his co-defendants; later that year he was also acquitted of the charge of Mafia association, for which he was standing trial in Palermo.

Local prosecutors successfully appealed the acquittal and there was a retrial, which in 2002 convicted Andreotti and sentenced him to 24 years imprisonment. Italians of all political allegiances denounced the conviction. Many failed to understand how the court could convict Andreotti of orchestrating the killing, yet acquit his co-accused, who supposedly had carried out his orders by setting up and committing the murder. The Italian supreme court definitively acquitted Andreotti of the murder in 2003.

== See also ==
- List of journalists killed in Europe
- List of victims of the Sicilian Mafia
- Aldo Moro
- Strategy of tension
- Propaganda Due
- Operation Gladio
