= Banda della Magliana =

Italian criminal organization

- Founded: 1975
- Founded by: Franco Giuseppucci, Enrico De Pedis, Maurizio Abbatino
- Founding location: Rome, Lazio
- Years active: 1975–1993 (The year of the «Operation Colosseum» conducted by the Polizia di Stato, the gang was progressively eradicated and crushed over the following years)
- Territory: Most active in the Rome metropolitan area, but also active throughout the Italian territory
- Ethnicity: Italians, mostly Romans and especially working-class Romans from the Magliana neighbourhood in Rome
- Membership (est.): Around 50 full members, an unknown number of associates
- Criminal activities: Racketeering, drug trafficking, murder, car theft, fencing, corruption, kidnapping, gambling, prostitution, robbery, fraud, weapons trafficking, loan sharking, contract killing, bookmaking, bootlegging, extortion, money laundering, political terrorism
- Allies: NAR; Sicilian Mafia; Camorra

The Banda della Magliana (Italian: [ˈbanda della maʎˈʎaːna], lit. 'Magliana Gang') was an Italian criminal organization based in Rome. It was founded in 1975. Given by the media, the name refers to the original neighbourhood, the Magliana, of some of its members.

The Banda della Magliana was heavily involved in criminal activities during Italy's Years of Lead (anni di piombo). The Italian government claimed that the Banda della Magliana was closely allied with and tied to other criminal organizations, such as Cosa Nostra, Camorra, and 'Ndrangheta. Some left-wing journalists have also claimed the gang had links to neofascist militant and terrorist groups, such as the Nuclei Armati Rivoluzionari (NAR), responsible for the 1980 Bologna massacre; the Italian secret services (SISMI), and political figures such as Licio Gelli, grand-master of the Freemasonic lodge Propaganda Due (P2). They have also alleged that, along with Gladio, the NATO clandestine anti-communist organization, P2 was involved in a strategy of tension during the Years of Lead which included false flag terrorist attacks. However, no concrete proof exists to support these claims, and a memoir by a gang insider made no mention of any supposed links.

The Banda della Magliana was involved with the usual activities of Italian criminal gangs, such as drug dealing, horse race betting, and money laundering, among others; its ties to political groups set it apart. It is believed to have been involved with events such as the 1978 murder of former prime minister Aldo Moro, leader of the Christian Democracy party, who was negotiating the Historic Compromise with the Italian Communist Party (PCI); the 1979 assassination of journalist Carmine Pecorelli; the 1980 Bologna massacre; the 1982 assassination attempt against Roberto Rosone, vice-president of Banco Ambrosiano; and also Roberto Calvi's 1982 murder. The mysterious disappearance of Emanuela Orlandi, a case peripherally linked to former Grey Wolves member Mehmet Ali Ağca's 1981 Pope John Paul II assassination attempt, has also been related to the gang. The Orlandi kidnapping was allegedly to persuade the legally immune Vatican Bank to restore funds to Banco Ambrosiano creditors.

== History ==
=== Beginnings ===
The first criminal act of the Banda della Magliana was the kidnapping of Duke Massimiliano Grazioli Lante della Rovere on 7 November 1977, against a ransom. The Duke was murdered but the ransom obtained anyhow, 1,500,000,000 lire of the time. Instead of spending everything, the group decided to keep the savings to invest in crime in Rome and take over the capital.

Unlike the Camorra or Cosa Nostra, the Banda della Magliana was not structured around a hierarchical pyramid. It was instead composed of various decentralized cells, each working on its own. Making equal shares and living off dividends obtained from the criminal association, they quickly took over Rome, surprising the underworld with their violent methods. If members were imprisoned, money continued to be sent to them through their families - while successful members, driving Ferraris and wearing Rolex watches, had to keep up their criminal activities, thus remaining "crime labourers" (operai del crimine).

=== Far-right ties and Mino Pecorelli's assassination ===
Some gang members, including founder Franco Giuseppucci, were far-right sympathizers. Crime, however, and not politics, was the main activity of the group, and some material incentives were much needed to get them involved in this field. One of their first contacts with the Italian neofascist movement was in the summer of 1978 — a few months after Aldo Moro's murder — in a villa in Rieti owned by criminologist, psychiatrist and neofascist professor Aldo Semerari. In exchange for financing his political activities, Semerari provided psychiatric expertise to arrested gang members in order to help them be released.

The deal did not last long, as Semerari was assassinated on 1 April 1982 in Ottaviano (Metropolitan City of Naples). He had made the same deal with Raffaele Cutolo's Nuova Camorra Organizzata (NCO), as well as with the rival organization of the Cutolo, the Nuova Famiglia (NF) headed by Carmine Alfieri. This pleased neither the NF nor the NCO. Besides being a famous far-right criminologist, Semerari was also a member of Propaganda Due (P2), a masonic lodge that had been turned into a conspirationist cell, and maintained links with SISMI, the Italian military intelligence agency.

More important links were found between the Banda della Magliana and the Nuclei Armati Rivoluzionari (NAR) far-right terrorist group, in particular through Massimo Carminati, a NAR member who was a good customer at Franco Giuseppucci and Maurizio Abbatino's bar. Massimo Carminati quickly became a "pupil" of the gang and introduced them to Valerio Fioravanti, Francesca Mambro, and Pierluigi Bragaglia who were later accused of complicity in the 1980 Bologna massacre. The two criminal organizations quickly became closely linked, with the Banda della Magliana laundering the money obtained from NAR's hold-ups to finance their political activities, while the NAR helped the Banda in street activities (racket, drug transportation, etc.). However, their most mysterious "joint venture," which raised serious questions, concerned weapons: ammunition, guns and bombs belonging to both groups were surprisingly found in the basements of the Italian Health Ministry.

In the same basement were found ammunition cartridges of a brand not easy to find on the market (Gevelot, a French ammo manufacturer). Coming from the same lot were four bullets, of the same type and use, which marked them as used for a specific homicide: Carmine Pecorelli, a journalist who had published allegations about Prime minister Giulio Andreotti's ties to the Mafia, and who was murdered in 1979. Giulio Andreotti and his leading assistant Claudio Vitalone have been suspected in plotting this assassination: Andreotti was convicted in November 2002 of ordering the murder of Pecorelli, and sentenced to twenty-four years imprisonment. But the eighty-three-year-old Andreotti was immediately released pending an appeal, and on 30 October 2003, an appeals court overturned the conviction and acquitted Andreotti of the original murder charge.

During the trial, Italian justice clearly proved the involvement of the banda della Magliana in Pecorelli's murder, although the person materially responsible for the killing, Massimo Carminati, was released. Also according to the judges, the trial proved "clear links between Claudio Vitalone and the banda della Magliana through the person of Enrico De Pedis" (alias Renatino, one of the leaders of the Banda della Magliana). They continued however by stating that the "probatory evidence was not unequivocal." Thus, due to insufficient evidence, Claudio Vitalone was released.

=== Roberto Calvi's case ===
Roberto Calvi, alias "God's Banker" (Il banchiere di Dio) in charge of Banco Ambrosiano, whose main-shareholder was the Vatican Bank, was killed in London on 18 June 1982. Banco Ambrosiano, which crashed in one of the major financial scandals of the 1980s, was involved in money-laundering activities for the Mafia and allegedly in funnelling funds to the Polish Solidarity trade union (Solidarność) and the Contras in Nicaragua. Ernesto Diotallevi, one of the leaders of the Banda della Magliana, is being prosecuted for Calvi's murder.

In 1997, Italian prosecutors in Rome implicated a member of the Sicilian Mafia, Giuseppe Calò, in Calvi's murder, along with Flavio Carboni, a Sardinian businessman with wide-ranging interests. Two other men, Ernesto Diotallevi (purportedly one of the leaders of the Banda della Magliana) and former Mafia member turned informer Francesco Di Carlo, were also alleged to be involved in the killing.

On 19 July 2005, Licio Gelli, the grand master of the Propaganda Due or P2 masonic lodge, was formally indicted by magistrates in Rome for the murder of Calvi, along with Giuseppe Calò, Ernesto Diotallevi, Flavio Carboni and Carboni's Austrian ex-girlfriend, Manuela Kleinszig. Licio Gelli, in his statement before the court, blamed figures connected with Calvi's work financing Solidarność, allegedly on behalf of the Vatican. Gelli was accused of having provoked Calvi's death in order to punish him for embezzling money from Banco Ambrosiano that was owed to him and the Mafia. The Mafia was also claimed to have wanted to prevent Calvi from revealing that Banco Ambrosiano had been used for money laundering.

On 5 October 2005, the trial of the five individuals charged with Calvi's murder began in Rome. The defendants were Giuseppe Calò, Flavio Carboni, Manuela Kleinszig, Ernesto Diotallevi, and Calvi's former driver and bodyguard Silvano Vittor. The trial took place in a specially fortified courtroom in Rome's Rebibbia prison and was expected to last up to two years.

On 6 June 2007, all five individuals were cleared by the court of murdering Calvi. Mario Lucio d'Andria, the presiding judge at the trial, threw out the charges citing "insufficient evidence" after hearing 20 months of evidence. The verdict was seen as a surprise by some observers. The court ruled that Calvi's death was murder and not suicide. The defence had suggested that there were plenty of people with a motive for Calvi's murder, including Vatican officials and Mafia figures who wanted to ensure his silence. Legal experts who had followed the trial said that the prosecutors found it hard to present a convincing case due to the 25 years that had elapsed since Calvi's death. An additional factor was that some key witnesses were unwilling to testify, untraceable, or dead. The prosecution had earlier called for Manuela Kleinszig to be cleared, stating that there was insufficient evidence against her, but it had sought life sentences for the four men.

On 7 May 2010, the Court of Appeals confirmed the acquittal of Calò, Carboni and Diotallevi. The public prosecutor Luca Tescaroli commented after the verdict that for the family "Calvi has been murdered for the second time." On 18 November 2011 the court of last resort, the Court of Cassation, confirmed the acquittal.

Furthermore, the son of Roberto Calvi has claimed that Emanuela Orlandi's case was closely related to Calvi's case.

=== Emanuela Orlandi ===
Emanuela Orlandi, a citizen of Vatican City, mysteriously disappeared on 22 June 1983 at the age of fifteen. Although the case still has not been solved, and Orlandi has remained missing ever since, apparently some have tried to exchange her for Grey Wolves member Mehmet Ali Ağca, who shot the Pope in 1981. Allegedly, some of the persons who tried to strike a deal with the Vatican were members of the Banda della Magliana.

In 2005, an anonymous phone call broadcast by the Rai 3 TV live programme Chi l'ha visto?, a transmission about missing people's finding, stated that in order to find a resolution to the Orlandi case, it would have to be discovered as to who is buried in Saint Apollinare church, and about the favour that Enrico De Pedis made to Cardinal Ugo Poletti at the time.

The church of Saint Apollinare, located near Rome's Piazza Navona, is home to a crypt where popes, cardinals and Christian martyrs are buried, as well as to the tomb of Enrico De Pedis, also known as Renatino, one of the most powerful heads of the Magliana gang, assassinated on 2 February 1990. The basilica is part of the same building of the Pontifical Institute of Sacred Music that Orlandi attended, and where she was last seen. De Pedis' interment in the church is an unusual procedure for a common citizen, also considering his gangster status. Cardinal Poletti, who was now deceased, authorized the interment at the time. In 2012, De Pedis' corpse was finally removed from the church.

In February 2006, an ex-member of the Magliana Gang recognized behind the voice of Mario, one of the killers working for De Pedis. Mario was one of the anonymous persons who had phoned to propose the exchange of Emanuela Orlandi for Mehmet Ali Ağca.

=== Mafia Capitale ===
A police investigation by Rome's chief prosecutor Giuseppe Pignatone, revealed a network of corrupt relationships between some politicians and criminals in the Italian capital.

On 18 December 2015, Alemanno was indicted for corruption and illicit financing. According to the accusation, Alemanno received €125,000 from the cooperatives' boss Salvatore Buzzi. On 7 February 2017, the allegation of an external cooperation in a mafia association was filed, including the allegations of corruption and illicit funding.

On 20 July 2017, Carminati was sentenced to 20 years in jail, along with other various sentences of his associates. On 11 September 2018, on appeal, Carminati was sentenced to 14 years and six months, with Buzzi sentenced to 18 years and four months.

== Historical leadership ==
=== Bosses ===
- 1976-1980 - Franco "er Negro" Giuseppucci - murdered.
- 1980-1990 - Enrico "Renatino" De Pedis - murdered.
- 1990-1992 - Maurizio "Crispino" Abbatino - jailed and turned informant.

== Historical battery (Batterie) ==
=== Magliana-Ostiense's battery ===
- 1976-1992 - Maurizio "Crispino" Abbatino

=== Testaccio-Trastevere's battery ===
- 1976-1980 - Ruling panel - Franco Giuseppucci, Enrico De Pedis
- 1980-1982 - Danilo "er Camaleonte" Abbruciati
- 1982-1992 - Raffaele "Palletta" Pernasetti

=== Ostia-Acilia's battery ===
- 1976-1981 - Nicolino "Sardo" Selis
- 1981-1992 - Antonio "Accattone" Mancini

=== Monte Sacro's battery ===
- 1976-1992 - Roberto Fittirillo

== See also ==
- Romanzo Criminale
- Romanzo criminale – La serie
