= Romanzo Criminale =

Romanzo criminale
- Movie poster for Romanzo criminale
- Directed by: Michele Placido
- Written by: Giancarlo De Cataldo
- Produced by: Marco Chimenz; Fabio Conversi; Jacqueline Quella; Bruno Ridolfi; Giovanni Stabilini; Riccardo Tozzi
- Starring: Kim Rossi Stuart; Anna Mouglalis; Pierfrancesco Favino; Claudio Santamaria; Stefano Accorsi; Riccardo Scamarcio; Jasmine Trinca
- Cinematography: Luca Bigazzi
- Edited by: Esmeralda Calabria
- Music by: Paolo Buonvino
- Production companies: Cattleya; Babe Films
- Distributed by: Warner Bros. Pictures (Italy and France); Icon Film Distribution (United Kingdom)
- Release date: 30 September 2005
- Running time: 153 minutes 174 minutes (director's cut)
- Countries: Italy; France; United Kingdom
- Language: Italian

Romanzo criminale (Italian pronunciation: [roˈmandzo krimiˈnaːle]; "Criminal Novel") is an Italian-language crime drama film released in 2005, directed by Michele Placido. It was highly acclaimed and won 15 awards. It is based on Giancarlo De Cataldo's 2002 novel, which is in turn inspired by the true story of the Banda della Magliana. The Magliana gang was one of the most powerful Italian criminal associations, dominating Rome's drug, gambling and other kinds of crime activities from the early 1970s until the death of Enrico De Pedis in 1992. The gang's affiliates started their career kidnapping rich people, drug dealing (hashish, cocaine, heroin, etc.). From the 1970s they started working with the Italian secret service, fascists, terrorists, the Sicilian Mafia, the Camorra, and many more. Some gang members are still alive, as inmates of an Italian prison, or justice collaborators.

The film is something of a showcase for a number of Italy's leading young film and television actors, notably Favino, who won a Donatello award for his performance as the gangster Lebanese (Libano).

In 2008 a spin-off TV series commenced broadcasting (Romanzo criminale – La serie).

== Plot ==
In 1970s Rome, four young delinquents, nicknamed Ice (Il Freddo), Lebanese (Libano), Dandi, and Grand, steal a car. Crashing through a police road block, the driver, Grand is crushed by the steering column. Back at their hideout, a small disused caravan near a beach, they are discovered by the police. Ice, Lebanese, and Dandi run away, but are captured. Grand, who is mortally wounded, dies in the caravan.

Some years later, in the 1970s, Ice is released from prison and joins up with Lebanese, who tells him he has come up with a plan to kidnap and hold to ransom Baron Rossellini, a wealthy aristocrat for whom Lebanese's parents worked. He has formed a gang with Dandi - they are Black (Il Nero), Bright Eye, Ricotta, Bufalo, Rat and Ciro and Aldo Buffoni. After negotiating the ransom of 3 billion lire, the Baron is shot by one of the Cannizzari brothers who have been entrusted by Lebanese to guard him. Nonetheless, they take a picture of the dead man with a newspaper and get the 3 billion lire. Before the gang receives the money, the local Police Commissioner Nicola Scialoja manages to record its serial numbers and sets out to capture the gang. As the gang divide up the money, Lebanese proposes to split 500 million lire between them, and use the remaining 2.5 billion to build a foothold in the criminal underworld of Rome, starting with drug dealing. However, the drug racket is owned by the dealer Terrible, and so the gang wipe out his gang, apart from Gemito, whom Lebanese bribes to help them. After his home is raided and his bodyguards killed, Terrible wakes to find Ice, Lebanese, and Dandi in his bedroom. Cornered, he reluctantly agrees to let give control of the racket to the gang.

The gang grows in influence and ambition. Rome falls under their rule, and the rule of Lebanese. Dandi meets and becomes enamored with an upmarket prostitute, Patrizia, who, in order to be kept under the sway of the gang and in order to prevent Dandi becoming involved in brawls provoked by his jealousy, is bought over and given a brothel. Ice, meanwhile falls in love with his younger brother Gigio's tutor, Roberta. However, Lebanese begins to consider Ice's romance a weakness, a point reinforced when Ice asks to withdraw from the gang. In response, Lebanese brings up the car theft from their childhood, where his leg was permanently damaged by the pursuing police. Ice and Roberta begin to learn English with the idea that they will elope. However, when Ice is at the Bologna Train Station, there was an organized bombing, representing the state collusion. Later, Ice receives a phone call informing him that Lebanese is dead, stabbed by Gemito after a bitter game of poker.

Then begins Ice's quest for vengeance, aided by Dandi.

Yet Scialoja is on their trail and succeeds in capturing Ice, then the other members of the gang except Dandi. Ice plans to escape from prison with the help of his friends, but a deadly spiral of score-settling has already begun to coil around them all.

== Cast ==
- Kim Rossi Stuart as Il Freddo
- Anna Mouglalis as Patrizia
- Pierfrancesco Favino as Libano
- Claudio Santamaria as Il Dandi
- Stefano Accorsi as Commissario Scialoja
- Riccardo Scamarcio as Il Nero
- Jasmine Trinca as Roberta
- Toni Bertorelli as La Voce
- Gigi Angelillo as Zio Carlo
- Antonello Fassari as Ciro Buffoni
- Elio Germano as Il Sorcio
- Franco Interlenghi as Barone Rosellini
- Donato Placido as Colussi
- Massimo Popolizio as Il Terribile
