= Magliana =

Urban zone of Rome, Italy

Coordinates: 41°49′52″N 12°24′06″E

Location of Magliana within the Municipality of Rome

The Magliana (Italian pronunciation: [maʎˈʎaːna]) is an urban zone of Rome, known as 15E of Municipio XI of Rome. It also the name of a neighborhood or ward of the city. Geographically, it is located on the southwest periphery of Rome, Italy along the Tiber River. The neighborhood dates back to the mid-1900s and is home to a diverse group of people of all ages and ethnicities. About 40,000 people reside in Magliana; housing is made up of mostly owner-occupied apartments in 7–8 story apartment buildings.

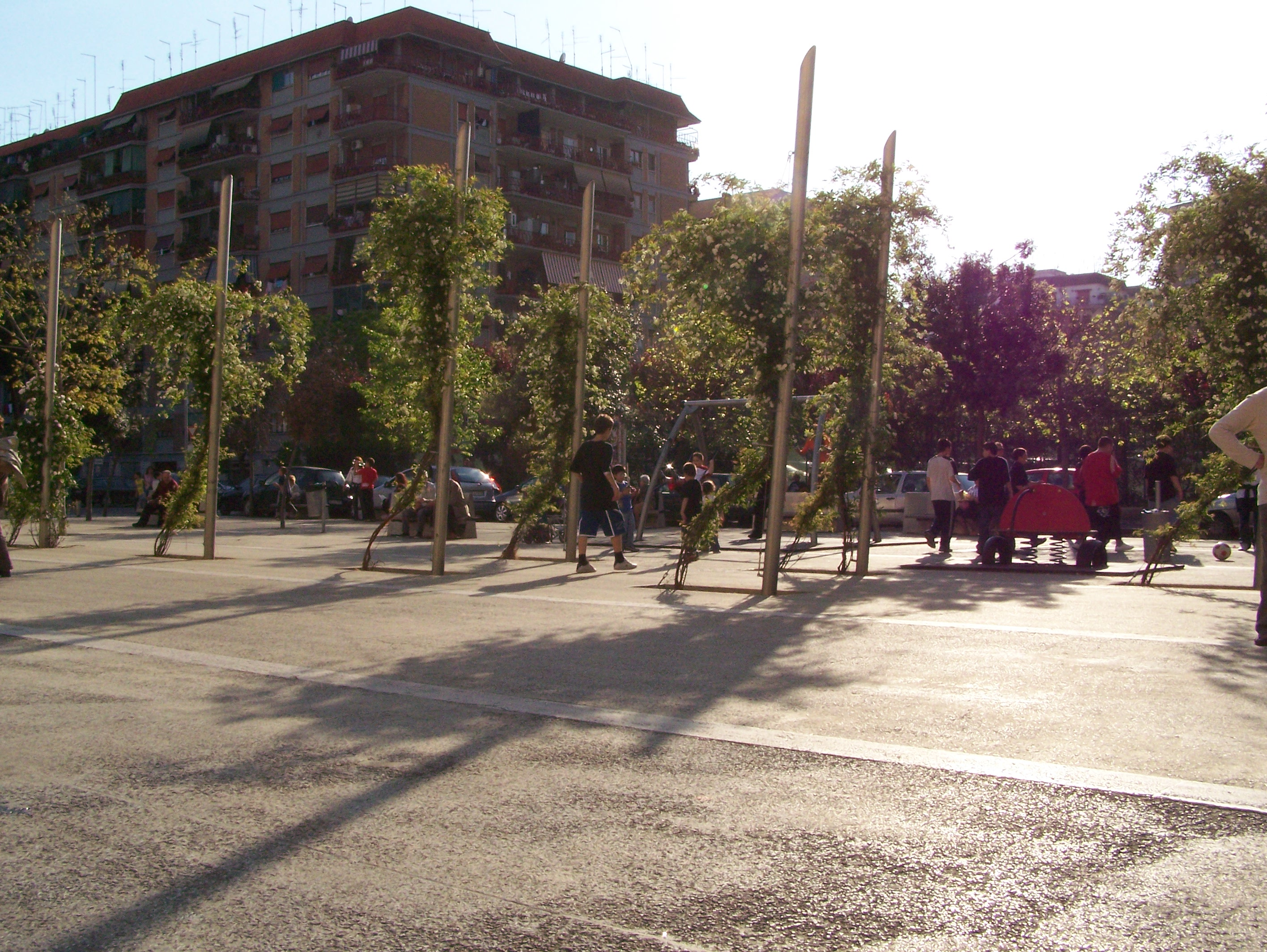
Piazza Fabrizio De André and apartment building

The space is home to a good deal of economic activity that stretches from the main street, Via Della Magliana in the northwest of the neighborhood, to the southeast towards the Tiber River. However, businesses, activity, and buildings taper off as the neighborhood nears the river bank. Finally, between the built neighborhood and the river is a running trail along an area of farmland.

The neighborhood is confined by the Tiber on the east and Railroad tracks on the west edge.

In the center of Magliana there are two main areas of congregation: Piazza Fabrizio De Andre and the Mercato Magliana (Magliana Market). The Piazza Fabrizio De Andre is consistently filled with people; in the morning the older generation can be seen sitting on the many benches or strolling through. In the afternoon through early evening it is usually filled with more than 60 children playing on the playground equipment. The Mercato Magliana is open in the morning and early afternoon and offers a wide variety of goods at discount prices.

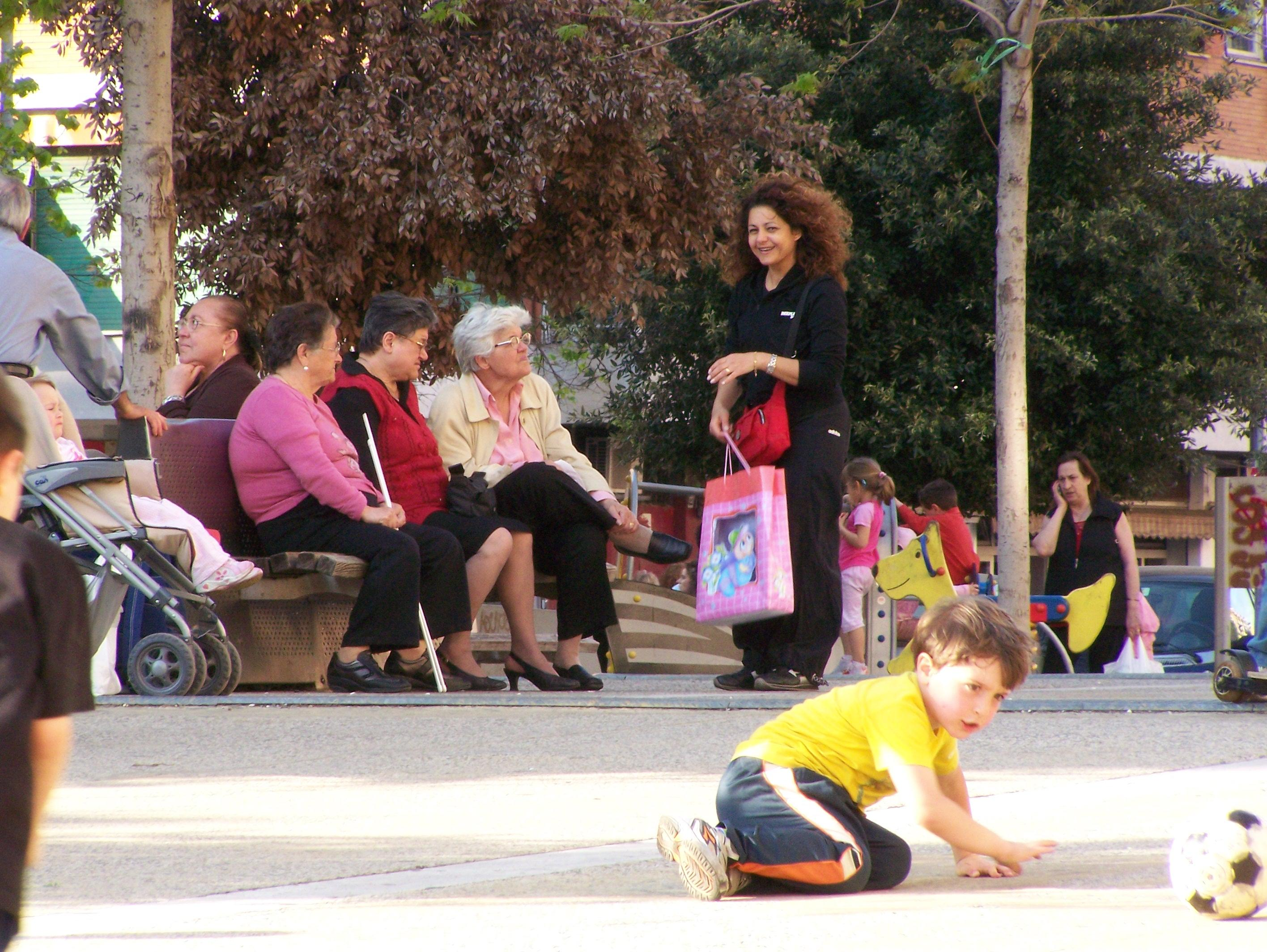
Piazza Fabrizio de Andre

== History ==
Magliana began as an informal settlement taken over by migrants from other parts of Italy. The engineer Michelangelo Bonellie was the owner during the period of illegal settlement. The neighbourhood was not included in the Piano de 1931, the government's first approach to urban planning in Rome. Even though Magliana contained a high concentration of people living in poverty, the government chose to develop EUR instead of Magliana. Co-ordinated construction of houses in the Magliana started in the 1960s. As the population grew, residents lived in increasingly crowded conditions and the lack of basic necessities became more evident. Homes did not contain running water or sewage systems. Eventually, real estate speculators gained control of the area. Their projects displayed abusivismo, disregard for building regulations, and included construction in areas located below river level and consequently threatened by flooding. Many apartment complexes remain illegal because of their location and lack of modification to accommodate the natural environment. The government ignored the underprivileged and underdeveloped state of Magliana and its residents, which enraged the community and resulted in the formation of citizens' action committees (Comitato dei Quartieri). The neighbourhood became particularly infamous from the late 1970s onwards for its the high levels of crime, particularly by the presence of the Banda della Magliana, a Roman Mafia-like organization that at one point took control of most of the city's criminal activities, and it was so named by the press because many of its original members hailed from the neighbourhood.

== Community activism ==
Magliana was historically an underserved community that has fought to receive fair treatment from city and municipal authorities. Because Magliana was created by speculators in the 1970s in violation of construction regulations, it was not connected to city water, electricity.and sometimes power lines. Open spaces, sidewalks and roads were poorly maintained as well. Neighborhood residents organized, lobbied, protested and demanded for their neighbourhood be incorporated into Rome. The Comitato dei Quartieri della Magliana played a critical role in organising residents. During the 1970s, it even published a community newsletter.

Another area of activism in Magliana concerned evictions. Many of Magliana's residents were unprivileged during the 1970s. Landlords would demand unmanageable rents from residents even though apartments were sometimes not connected to water and telephone lines. Residents organized to halt evictions by developing strong networks and informing each other of pending evictions, and on the day of the intended evictions, they would telephone one another when the police entered the neighborhoods and residents would gather in the streets, and physically prevent police from entering the neighborhood. As a result of the activism, fewer evictions occurred in Magliana over time.

Though the amount of activist activity in Magliana has decreased since the 1970s, there is still a significant amount of community organizing. There are squatter settlements in Magliana which house people who, for whatever reason, are not able to obtain housing. They are primarily run by communist and socialist organizations.

On the more organised end of the spectrum, the Comitato di quartiere still holds activities and also teaches an Italian-language class for immigrants two days a week.

== See also ==
- Banda della Magliana
- Administrative subdivision of Rome
- Roma, Italy
