= Giancarlo De Cataldo =

Italian writer (born 1956)

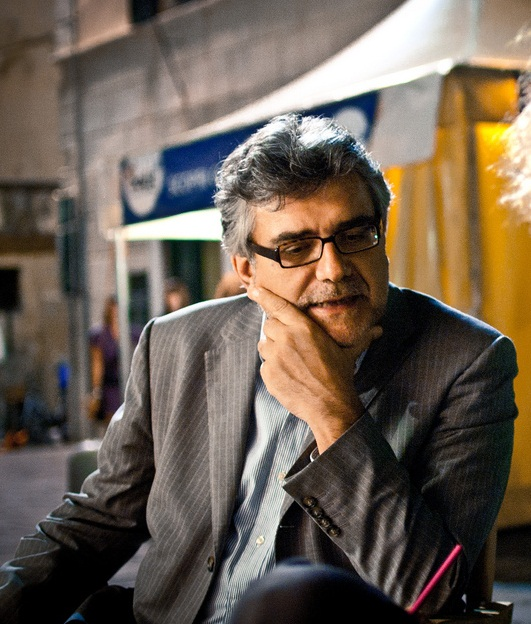
- De Cataldo in 2010
- Born: 7 February 1956 (age 70); Taranto, Italy
- Occupation: Writer

Giancarlo De Cataldo (born 7 February 1956) is an Italian crime novelist, screenwriter and dramatist.

== Life and career ==
Born in Taranto, De Cataldo graduated in law and worked as a magistrate, becoming a judge at the Corte d'Assise in Rome. He made his literary debut in 1989, with the novel Nero come il cuore ("As black as the heart"), which has been described as a "mix of detective story, noir and legal thriller". He is best known for the novels Romanzo Criminale (2002), which was adapted into a film by Michele Placido, and Suburra (2015), co-written with Carlo Bonini and adapted into a film by Stefano Sollima.

Also an essayist, a playwright, a translator, a radio and television writer and a screenwriter, De Cataldo's credits include Mario Martone's We Believed, for which he won a David di Donatello Award. He collaborated with numerous publications, including la Repubblica, Il Messaggero, L'Unità, Paese Sera and La Gazzetta del Mezzogiorno.
