= Enrico De Pedis =

Italian gangster (1954–1990)

- Born: 15 May 1954; Rome, Italy
- Died: 2 February 1990 (aged 35); Rome, Italy
- Other name: Renatino
- Allegiance: Banda della Magliana

Enrico De Pedis (Italian pronunciation: [enˈriːko de peˈdis]; 15 May 1954 − 2 February 1990) was an Italian gangster and one of the bosses of the Banda della Magliana, an Italian criminal organization based in the city of Rome, particularly active throughout the late 1970s until the early 1990s. His nickname was "Renatino". Unlike other members of his gang, De Pedis possessed a strong entrepreneurial spirit. While other members squandered their earnings, he invested his illicit proceeds (in construction companies, restaurants, boutiques, etc.).

Along with many of the crimes committed by his gang, De Pedis has also been linked to the disappearance of Emanuela Orlandi, whose case has been linked with the Pope John Paul II assassination attempt. On 2 February 1990, De Pedis was ambushed and murdered by his former colleagues on Via del Pellegrino near Campo de' Fiori. He was buried in the Sant'Apollinare Basilica in Rome.

In 2009, the Rome prosecutor's offices investigated why De Pedis was entombed in the Vatican-owned basilica. According to the former Banda della Magliana member Antonio Mancini, speaking in 2011, this was a reward to De Pedis for his role in persuading other members to stop the strikes (including Orlandi's kidnapping) that the gang was making against the Vatican in order to force the restitution of large amounts of money they had lent to the Vatican Bank through Roberto Calvi's Banco Ambrosiano.

In May 2012, the tomb was opened and bones were removed as part of the investigation into Orlandi's disappearance. In June 2012, De Pedis' corpse was finally removed from the church, cremated and the ashes dissolved in the sea.

== See also ==
- Romanzo Criminale
- Romanzo criminale – La serie
