= List of members of the 'Ndrangheta =

This is a list of members of the 'Ndrangheta, a Mafia-type organisation in Calabria, Italy.

== A ==
- Antonio Alvaro
- Carmine Alvaro
- Cosimo Alvaro
- Domenico Alvaro
- Domenico Alvaro Jr.
- Salvatore Aquino
- Santo Araniti

== B ==
- Carmelo Barbaro
- Francesco Barbaro (Castanu)
- Giuseppe Barbaro
- Giuseppe Bellocco
- Gregorio Bellocco
- Umberto Bellocco
- Michele Bolognino
- Carmelo Bruzzese

== C ==
- Salvatore Calautti
- Antonio Cataldo
- Francesco Cataldo
- Giuseppe Cataldo
- Antonio Coluccio
- Giuseppe Coluccio
- Salvatore Coluccio
- Antonio Commisso
- Francesco Commisso
- Cosimo Commisso
- Giuseppe Commisso
- Domenico Condello
- Pasquale Condello
- Antonio Cordì aka 'U Ragiuneri
- Cosimo Cordì
- Domenico Cordì
- Pietro Criaco

== D ==
- Giuseppe D'Agostino
- Vincenzo DeMaria
- Carmine De Stefano
- Giorgio De Stefano
- Giorgio De Stefano (1948)
- Giuseppe De Stefano
- Orazio De Stefano
- Paolo De Stefano
- Paolo Rosario De Stefano
- Emilio Di Giovine

== F ==
- Luigi Facchineri
- Ernesto Fazzalari
- Giuseppe Flachi
- Francesco Fonti

== G ==
- Bruno Gioffré
- Rocco Gioffrè
- Giuseppe Giorgi

== I ==
- Giuseppe Iamonte
- Natale Iamonte
- Vincenzo Iamonte
- Antonio Imerti

== L ==
- Michele Labate
- Antonio Libri
- Domenico Libri
- Rocco Lo Presti

== M ==
- Antonio Macrì
- Antonio Mammoliti
- Saverio Mammoliti
- Francesco Mazzaferro
- Girolamo Molè
- Giuseppe Morabito
- Rocco Morabito (born 1960)
- Rocco Morabito (born 1966)
- Salvatore Morabito

== N ==
- Antonio Nirta
- Francesco Nirta
- Giuseppe Nirta (born 1913)
- Giuseppe Nirta (born 1940)

== O ==
- Domenico Oppedisano

== P ==
- Roberto Pannunzi
- Antonio Papalia
- Domenico Papalia
- Rocco Papalia
- Domenico Paviglianiti
- Antonio Pelle aka "Ntoni Gambazza" or "La Mamma"
- Giuseppe Pelle
- Salvatore Pelle
- Sebastiano Pelle
- Antonino Pesce
- Francesco Pesce aka "Cicciu testuni"
- Salvatore Pesce
- Vincenzo Pesce
- Gioacchino Piromalli
- Girolamo Piromalli
- Giuseppe Piromalli (born 1921)
- Giuseppe Piromalli (born 1945)

== R ==
- Antonio Romeo
- Sebastiano Romeo
- Diego Rosmini
- Michele Racco
- Domenic Racco
- Slick Ricardo

== S ==
- Gaetano Santaiti
- Maria Serraino
- Domenico Serraino
- Paolo Serraino
- Antonio Strangio
- Giovanni Strangio
- Sebastiano Strangio

== T ==
- Giovanni Tegano
- Pasquale Tegano
- Robert Trimbole
- Domenico Tripodo
- Franco Coco Trovato

== U ==
- Luigi Ursino

== V ==
- Michele Antonio Varano
- Carmine Verduci
- Francesco Vottari

== Z ==
- Rocco Zito
