= Pelle 'ndrina =

- Named after: Antonio Pelle
- Founding location: San Luca, Calabria, Italy
- Years active: 1970s-present
- Territory: San Luca and Locride in Calabria. Presence also in Lombardy
- Ethnicity: Calabrians
- Allies: Barbaro 'ndrina Catania Mafia family Colombian drug cartels
- Rivals: Nirta-Strangio 'ndrina

The Pelle 'ndrina, also known as the Pelle-Vottari, are a clan of the 'Ndrangheta, a criminal and mafia-type organisation in Calabria, Italy. They are among the most influential 'ndrine of the 'Ndrangheta having members who regularly reside in the advisory and top management bodies of the organization, in particular in the Ionian mandamento and in the crimine. They are also present in Milan and its metropolitan city.

The clan is active in the international trafficking of cocaine, for which it has contacts with the Colombian drug cartels, and in the appropriation of contracts and extortion. Its corrupt influence in regional elections was documented in the 2010 Reale investigation.

== Prominent members ==
- Antonio Pelle (1932–2009), known as 'Ntoni Gambazza, a prominent member of the 'Ndrangheta; arrested and died in 2009.
- Salvatore Pelle, known as Sarvu Gambazza, arrested.
- Francesco Vottari, known as U Frunzu, capobastone, arrested in October 2007.
- Francesco Pelle, known as Ciccio Pakistan, a fugitive since July 2019 after being sentenced to life imprisonment for the murder of Maria Strangio, wife of Giovanni Luca Nirta. He was arrested in March 2021, in Portugal, where he was receiving treatment for COVID-19.
- Antonio Pelle, known as "Vanchelli" or "his mother", was arrested in 1998 and was sentenced in the first instance to 19 years in prison but was acquitted on appeal. He was arrested again on October 16, 2008 in Ardore Marina and sentenced in first instance to 41bis, but then taken to hospital in September 2011 for serious health problems, from which he escaped on September 15, 2011 until his final capture on October 5, 2016 after five years on the run.
- Giuseppe Pelle, head of 'ndrina following the death of his father Antonio Pelle, top member of the Ionian district and of the whole' Ndrangheta, and married to the daughter of Francesco Barbaro, investigated for attempted extortion and illegal competition for public works in Siderno, Palizzi, Condofuri and Natile di Careri in the Mandamento Jonico trial, and in the Reale investigation, for corruptly influencing the 2010 Regional elections. He was arrested on 6 April 2018 in Condofuri, after two years of inaction.
- Giuseppe Vottari, known as "U massaru" or "capobastone", allied with the Nirta clan since the early seventies.

== Recent events ==
On March 10, 2022, Francesco Pelle, son of Giuseppe Pelle, was arrested in Calvignasco, in Lombardy, for having facilitated his father’s fugitive status. Francesco, a former special surveillance subject with multiple prior convictions, had been working for a year as a janitor at a school in Vermezzo con Zelo, where he also assisted students with disabilities. He was arrested along with his brother Antonio, his mother Marianna Barbaro, his sister Elisa (placed under house arrest), and, in addition to two accomplices and a cousin, Elisa's husband Giuseppe, who had resided for an extended period in Gudo Visconti, near Calvignasco.

According to the Italian Anti-Mafia Agency (DIA), investigations, particularly the "Devozione" operation carried out on June 19, 2024, revealed that the Pelle 'ndrina has emerged as a key cocaine supplier to various criminal groups in the Sicilian city of Catania, including Cosa Nostra. The 'ndrina has established a well-developed drug trafficking network involving prominent figures from the Catania Mafia family, particularly through the Nizza faction, as well as with other criminal organizations operating in the city that are not part of Cosa Nostra, such as the Cappello clan and the Cursoti clan.
