= Crime family =

Unit of an organized crime syndicate

A crime family is a unit of an organized crime syndicate, often operating within a specific geographic territory or a specific set of activities. In its strictest sense, a family (or clan) is a criminal gang, operating either on a unitary basis or as an organized collection of smaller gangs (e.g., cells, factions, crews, etc.). In turn, a family can be a sole "enterprise" or part of a larger syndicate or cartel. Despite the name, most crime families are generally not based on or formed around actual familial connections, although they do tend to be ethnically based, and many members may in fact be related to one another. Crime "families" tend to be associated more directly with their respective territories than the individuals to whom their members may or may not be related.

== Origins ==
The origins of the term come from the Sicilian Mafia. In the Sicilian language, the word cosca, which is the crown of spiny, closely folded leaves on plants such as the artichoke or the thistle, symbolizes the tightness of relationships between members. The word cosca is also used for clan. In the early days of the Mafia, loose groups of bandits organized themselves into associations that over time became more organized, and they adopted the term based on both of its meanings.

As the Italian-American Mafia was imported into the United States in the late 19th century, the English translation of the word cosca was more at clan or family.

The term can be a point of confusion, especially in popular culture and Hollywood, because in the truest sense, crime families are not necessarily blood families who happen to be involved in criminal activity, and they are not necessarily based on blood relationships. In Sicily and America, most Mafia bosses are not related to their predecessors.

In addition to the traditional families of the Sicilian Mafia, other major Italian criminal organizations—particularly the 'Ndrangheta in Calabria and the Camorra in Campania, are also structured around criminal families. These families, often rooted in longstanding local alliances, form the core units of each organization. They typically operate with a high degree of autonomy, exerting control over specific territories and managing a wide range of illicit enterprises, including drug trafficking, extortion, money laundering, and arms smuggling. Their structure is deeply embedded in the social fabric of their respective regions, often blending criminal power with political and economic influence. In many cases, these families have endured for generations, maintaining their dominance through a combination of violence, tradition, and tight-knit loyalty.

== Italian crime families ==
=== Sicilian Mafia families ===
In Sicily, mafia families are named after the regions they control, which may include cities, neighborhoods, or districts.

==== Province of Agrigento ====
In the province of Agrigento there are 39 families divided into 7 mandamenti:

- Campobello di Licata mandamento is composed of 5 Mafia families – Campobello di Licata, Canicattì, Castrofilippo, Grotte-Comitini-Racalmuto, Ravanusa.
- Palma di Montechiaro mandamento is composed of 4 Mafia families – Camastra, Licata, Naro, Palma di Montechiaro.
- Agrigento mandamento is composed of 4 Mafia families – Giardina Gallotti-Agrigento, Porto Empedocle, Realmonte, Siculiana.
- Bivona mandamento is composed of 11 Mafia families – Alessandria della Rocca, Aragona, Bivona, Cammarata, Casteltermini, Sant’Angelo Muxaro, San Biagio Platani, Santa Elisabetta, San Giovanni Gemini, Santo Stefano Quisquina, Raffadali.
- Burgio mandamento is composed of 5 Mafia families – Burgio, Calamonaci, Caltabellotta, Lucca Sicula, Villafranca Sicula.
- Santa Margherita Belice mandamento is composed of 5 Mafia families – Santa Margherita Belice, Menfi, Montevago, Sambuca di Sicilia, Sciacca.
- Cianciana mandamento is composed of 5 Mafia families – Cianciana, Cattolica Eraclea, Montallegro, Joppolo Giancaxio, Ribera.

==== Province of Caltanissetta ====
In the province of Caltanissetta there are 14 families divided into 4 mandamenti:

- Vallelunga Pratameno mandamento is composed of 4 Mafia families – San Cataldo, Vallelunga Pratameno, Marianopoli, Caltanissetta.
- Riesi mandamento is composed of 3 Mafia families – Riesi, Delia, Sommatino.
- Gela mandamento is composed of 3 Mafia families – Gela, Niscemi, Mazzarino.
- Mussomeli mandamento is composed of 4 Mafia families – Campofranco-Sutera, Montedoro-Milena-Bonpensiere, Serradifalco, Mussomeli.

==== Province of Catania ====
In the province of Catania there's no mandamenti, the territory is divided between 3 Mafia families:

- Catania
- Caltagirone
- Ramacca

==== Province of Enna ====
In the province of Enna there's no mandamenti, the territory is divided between 5 Mafia families:

- Villarosa
- Calascibetta
- Enna
- Pietraperzia
- Barrafranca

==== Province of Palermo ====
According to DIA reports, the territory of the city of Palermo alone is controlled by 33 families divided into 8 mandamenti:

- San Lorenzo-Tommaso Natale mandamento is composed of 8 Mafia families – San Lorenzo, Tommaso Natale-Cardillo, Pallavicino-ZEN, Partanna-Mondello, Capaci-Isola delle Femmine, Carini, Cinisi, Terrasini.
- Resuttana mandamento is composed of 3 Mafia families – Resuttana, Acquasanta, Arenella.
- Passo di Rigano-Boccadifalco mandamento is composed of 3 Mafia families – Passo di Rigano-Boccadifalco, Torretta, Uditore.
- Noce mandamento is composed of 3 Mafia families – Noce, Malaspina-Cruillas, Altarello di Baida.
- Pagliarelli mandamento is composed of 5 Mafia families – Borgo Molara, Corso Calatafimi, Pagliarelli, Rocca-Mezzomonreale, Villaggio Santa Rosalia.
- Porta Nuova mandamento is composed of 4 Mafia families – Borgo Vecchio, Palermo Centro, Porta Nuova, Kalsa.
- Brancaccio mandamento is composed of 4 Mafia families – Brancaccio, Ciaculli-Croce Verde, Corso dei Mille, Roccella.
- Santa Maria di Gesù mandamento is composed of 3 Mafia families – Guadagna, Santa Maria di Gesù, Villagrazia.

In the province of Palermo there are 46 families operating into 7 mandamenti:

- Misilmeri mandamento is composed of 5 Mafia families – Belmonte Mezzagno, Bolognetta, Misilmeri, Villafrati-Cefalà Diana, Santa Cristina Gela.
- Bagheria mandamento is composed of 5 Mafia families – Altavilla Milicia, Bagheria, Casteldaccia, Ficarazzi, Villabate.
- Corleone mandamento is composed of 8 Mafia families – Corleone, Godrano, Lercara Friddi, Marineo, Mezzojuso, Palazzo Adriano, Prizzi, Roccamena.
- Camporeale (born from the union between the mandamenti of Partinico and San Giuseppe Jato) mandamento is composed of 10 Mafia families – Altofonte, Borgetto, Camporeale, Giardinello, Monreale, Montelepre, Partinico, Piana degli Albanesi, San Cipirello, San Giuseppe Jato.
- Caccamo mandamento is composed of 10 Mafia families – Baucina, Caccamo, Ciminna, Roccapalumba, Termini Imerese, Trabia, Valledolmo, Ventimiglia di Sicilia, Vicari, Montemaggiore Belsito.
- San Mauro Castelverde (also known as delle Madonie) mandamento is composed of 8 Mafia families – San Mauro Castelverde, Collesano, Gangi, Lascari, Polizzi Generosa, Campofelice di Roccella, Sciara-Cerda, Mistretta.

==== Province of Trapani ====
In the province of Trapani there are 17 families divided into 4 mandamenti:

- Alcamo mandamento is composed of 3 Mafia families – Alcamo, Calatafimi, Castellammare del Golfo.
- Castelvetrano mandamento is composed of 6 Mafia families – Castelvetrano, Campobello di Mazara, Salaparuta-Poggioreale, Partanna, Gibellina, Santa Ninfa.
- Mazara del Vallo mandamento is composed of 4 Mafia families – Mazara del Vallo, Salemi, Vita, Marsala.
- Trapani mandamento is composed of 4 Mafia families – Trapani, Valderice, Custonaci, Paceco.

=== 'Ndrangheta ===
"Crime families" are also typical of the 'Ndrangheta in Calabria, where however they are more specifically called 'ndrine, blood-related families and their relatives, who control all illicit activities within a given area. Unlike in the Sicilian mafia, the names of the crime families are based on the surnames of their historical leaders. Examples include the Barbaro 'ndrina, from Platì, named after the Barbaro family; the De Stefano 'ndrina, from Reggio Calabria, named after De Stefano brothers, Paolo, Giovanni, Giorgio and Orazio; the Pelle 'ndrina, from San Luca, named after Antonio Pelle; the Piromalli 'ndrina, from Gioia Tauro, named after Girolamo Piromalli; the Pesce 'ndrina, from Rosarno, named after Giuseppe Pesce, among others.

=== Camorra ===
"Crime families" within the Camorra are organized into groups known as clans, and similar to the 'Ndrangheta, these clans are often named after their historical leaders. However, unlike the Calabrian organization, the Camorra is far less rooted in blood ties. It is significantly more open to the recruitment of new members who do not necessarily have any familial relationship with existing members. This looser structure makes the Camorra more flexible and adaptable, but also contributes to internal instability and frequent violent rivalries between clans, as alliances shift and leadership struggles emerge. Examples include the Nuvoletta clan, from Marano di Napoli, named after the Nuvoletta brothers: Lorenzo, Angelo and Ciro; the Mazzarella clan, from San Giovanni a Teduccio, named after the Mazzarella family; the Di Lauro clan, from Secondigliano, named after Paolo Di Lauro; the Moccia clan, from Afragola, named after Gennaro Moccia; the Giuliano clan, from Forcella, named after Pio Vittorio Giuliano; the Mallardo clan, from Giugliano in Campania, named after Francesco Mallardo, among others.

== See also ==
- Crime boss
- Drug cartel
- Drug lord
- Gun moll
- List of crime bosses
- List of criminal enterprises, gangs and syndicates
- List of political families

== Bibliography ==
- Gambetta, Diego (2009). Codes of the Underworld. Princeton University Press. ISBN 978-0-691-11937-3
