= San Luca feud =

Feud within 'Ndrangheta

Date	1991 - present
Location	San Luca

Belligerents
Strangio-Nirta family	Pelle-Vottari-Romeo family

The San Luca feud or Vendetta of San Luca is a long-running conflict between two clans of the 'Ndrangheta crime organisation that began in 1991 in Italy's Calabria region in the village of San Luca.

== History ==
The two involved clans, the Strangio-Nirta and Pelle-Vottari-Romeo families, both belong to the 'Ndrangheta crime organization. During a fight at a carnival celebration in 1991 two young men from Strangio-Nirta were killed, leading to a series of feuds. In May 1993, four people were killed in an hour. Shortly thereafter, the old patriarch Antonio Nirta imposed a peace with the help of the De Stefano clan from Reggio Calabria, which held for some time. A truce was called in 2000.

The feud resumed after an honour killing on 5 January 2005. Domenico Giorgi of the Strangio-Nirta clan killed Salvatore Favasuli, a relative of the Pelle-Vottari clan, for having threatened Giorgi's girlfriend. Giorgi fled to Piedmont, but the family of Favasuli killed his brother Antonio Giorgi. The Strangio-Nirta clan reacted by shooting Francesco Pelle, "Ciccio Pakistan", while on the balcony with his newborn child. A bullet entered his back and he remained paralyzed. From his wheelchair he claimed revenge, and on Christmas Day, December 25, 2006, they attacked the house of a boss of the rival Strangio-Nirta clan, Giovanni Luca Nirta, killing his wife Maria Strangio. At the funeral of Maria Strangio, her cousin Giovanni Strangio appeared with a gun, presumably to kill members of the Pelle-Romeo clan. He was arrested and released in July 2007. Until August 2007, five more murders and eight attempted murders in Calabria were attributed to the feud.

During the reconstruction of Christmas attack at the trial in 2011, the prosecution said that there was a "state of war" between the two clans. Evidence collected by phone taps, interceptions and declarations of turncoats (pentito) showed that the instigator of the attack was Francesco Pelle, also known as 'Ciccio Pakistan', while the order came from Franco Vottari. Among the perpetrators of the crime, was Sebastiano Vottari, a brother of Franco.

== Duisburg massacre ==
Duisburg massacre
- Location: Outside the Da Bruno restaurant in Duisburg.
- Date: 15 August 2007
- Target: Members of the Pelle-Vottari-Romeo 'Ndrangheta clans
- Attack type: Mass shooting
- Deaths: 6
- Perpetrators: 'Ndrangheta hit squad of the Strangio-Nirta clan, composed of Giovanni Strangio and Giuseppe Nirta.

Mugshot of Marco Marmo, one of the victims of the Duisburg massacre.

The conflict then received significant new public attention on 15 August 2007 when six Italian nationals belonging to the Pelle-Romeo clan were shot dead in their cars in front of a pizzeria in Duisburg, Germany, near the central train station. The victims, aged 16 to 38, were all employees or co-owners of the pizzeria, and killed as they arrived for an 18th birthday celebration. Four of them were long-time residents of North Rhine-Westphalia, while two had recently travelled over from Italy.

One of the killed men, Marco Marmo, was seen as responsible for the murder of Maria Strangio. It is believed that the men had moved to Germany to escape the feud. Giovanni Strangio was identified as one of the two gunmen who fired more than 70 shots from automatic firearms. The second gunman is believed to be Strangio's brother-in-law Giuseppe Nirta (born in 1973), also wanted for international cocaine trafficking.

In Germany, the massacre instigated the mafianeindanke movement, inspired by the example of the anti-Mafia movement Addiopizzo in Sicily.

=== Chasing the suspects ===
A massacre of this size had been unprecedented in the history of the 'Ndrangheta. Italian police drastically heightened security measures in San Luca as a result, and arrested over 30 'Ndrangheta members, including Giovanni Luca Nirta. Nirta's rival Francesco Vottari was arrested on 12 October 2007. German and Italian police cooperated, and four members of the Strangio-Nirta clan were arrested in December 2007; the main suspect of the shooting, Giovanni Strangio, was however able to escape. The head of the Strangio-Nirta clan, Giuseppe Nirta was arrested on 23 May 2008 and his son and successor Paolo Nirta (a cousin of Giovanni Strangio) on August 7, 2008.

Police concluded from telephone surveillance that the 'Ndrangheta clan bosses had negotiated a cease fire near the Sanctuary of Our Lady of Polsi in Aspromonte, a traditional meeting place of the 'Ndrangheta. According to prosecutor Nicola Gratteri the elite bosses of the 'Ndrangheta imposed a peace directly after the Duisburg massacre.

On 12 March 2009, Dutch police arrested Giovanni Strangio and his brother-in-law, Francesco Romeo, in an apartment in Diemen near Amsterdam, after German police learned that they were hiding there by following clues found in Nirta's flat after his arrest. On 11 February 2010, police arrested Sebastiano Nirta in San Luca suspected of being Strangio's accomplices in the Duisburg killings. The jailed Giuseppe Nirta received an additional arrest warrant. Both were charged on the basis of DNA evidence recovered from the crime scene.

=== Trial ===
The trial against the killers started on 14 April 2010, in Locri. Strangio followed the hearing via video link to his prison cell in Rome. On 12 July 2011, the Criminal Court in Locri sentenced eight people to life imprisonment for their roles in a violent feud, including Giovanni Strangio, Gianluca Nirta, Francesco Nirta (37), Giuseppe Nirta, known as 'Peppe u versu' (71), Francesco Pelle, known as 'Ciccio Pakistan' (34), Sebastiano Romeo (34), Francesco Vottari known as 'Ciccio u Frunzu' (40) and Sebastiano Vottari, known as 'il Professore' (28). Three other people were convicted and sentenced to terms ranging from nine to 12 years, while three more were acquitted.

== Non-involvement of main Pelle clan ==
Antonio Pelle, also known as Ntoni Gambazza, the patriarch of the San Luca locale and the 'Ndrangheta capo crimine, the titular head of the organisation, tried in every way to end the feud and make peace. However, he was only able to secure that the section of the clan he headed ("Pelle-Gambazza") was not involved in the feud that affected another element of the clan ("Pelle-Vanchelli").

Notwithstanding his non-involvement in the facts, Antonio Pelle was indirectly involved through his son-in-law, Francesco Vottari, one the protagonists among disputing clans, who is married to his daughter Maria Pelle. In order to underline his non-involvement in the feud, he asked family members to send a letter to the Gazzetta del Sud newspaper. The message was clear: the feud was a clash between minor elements of the clan and Gambazza was trying to reach a peace without victors, as he had done in the past, in 1991, when the conflict started.

== Related links ==
- Category:'Ndranghetisti
- List of 'ndrine

== Sources ==
- "Rache am Weihnachtsmörder". Spiegel Online. August 16, 2007. (in German)
- "A Deadly Mafia Export from Italy". Spiegel Online. August 15, 2007.
- Mafia six killed over an egg, The Scotsman, 16 August 2007
- Mafia feud blamed for 'executions' in Germany, Financial Times, 16 August 2007
