= Camera di Controllo =

Members of 'Ndrangheta, a Mafia-type organisation in Calabria, Italy

The Camera di Controllo (Board of Control), is a collegial body of the 'Ndrangheta, a Mafia-type organisation in Calabria in Southern Italy. It is also known as La Provincia (the Province) or Camera di Compensazione (compensation board). It is composed of leading 'Ndrangheta members to decide on important questions concerning the organization and settling disputes.

== History ==
Although the 'Ndrangheta organisation did know centralized structures – such as the crimine – that weakly coordinated activities of the various 'ndrine, it was not until the end of the Second 'Ndrangheta war that raged from 1985 to 1991 that the Provincia or Camera, a more powerful and centralized body, was established. The bloody six-year war between the Condello-Imerti-Serraino-Rosmini clans and the De Stefano-Tegano-Libri-Latella clans left more than 600 deaths.

The Sicilian Mafia contributed to the end of the conflict and probably suggested the subsequent set up of a superordinate body, similar to the Sicilian Mafia Commission, to avoid further infighting. The body, also referred to as the Commission in reference to its Sicilian counterpart, is composed of three lower bodies, known as mandamenti. One for the clans on the Ionic side (the Aspromonte mountains and Locride) of Calabria, a second for the Tyrrhenian side (the plains of Gioia Tauro) and one central mandamento for the city of Reggio Calabria.

== Function ==
According to the pentito Pasquale Barreca the Provincia had "the authority of a true hierarchical superordinate power." Its primary function is the settlement of inter-family disputes. Any controversy between the various clans has to be submitted to the Commission before violence can be used. Smaller conflicts within the same 'Ndrangheta group are still left to the jurisdiction of the local family boss. If a decision of the Commission is ignored, all the locali – all the 'ndrine in a specific town or territory – are expected to line up against the one who violated the decision.

However, so far the Commission has not succeeded in ending all violent conflicts, such as the one between the Cordì and the Cataldo clans in Locri. Nevertheless, since the end of the Second 'Ndrangheta war a sharp decrease in homicides in Reggio Calabria province suggests that the peacekeeping role played by the Provincia is functioning to some extent.

== Members of the Commission ==
The membership of the first Provincia or Commission varies according to different testimonies of 'Ndrangheta turncoats (pentiti). The following names are mentioned:

- Domenico Alvaro and/or Cosimo Alvaro (Sinopoli)
- Salvatore Aquino (Marina di Gioiosa Ionica)
- Santo Araniti (Reggio Calabria)
- Francesco Barbaro (Platì)
- Umberto Bellocco or his brother Carmelo Bellocco (Rosarno)
- Giuseppe Cataldo (Locri)
- Francesco Commisso or Giuseppe Commisso (Siderno)
- Pasquale Condello (Reggio Calabria)
- Natale Iamonte (Melito di Porto Salvo)
- Domenico Libri (Reggio Calabria)
- Antonio Mammoliti (Castellace)
- Giuseppe Morabito (Africo)
- Francesco Mazzaferro (Gioiosa Ionica)
- Antonio Nirta "Il vecchio" (San Luca)
- Rocco Papalia (Platì)
- Antonio Pelle "Gambazza" (San Luca)
- Giuseppe Piromalli and/or Gioacchino Piromalli (Gioia Tauro)
- Sebastiano Romeo (San Luca)
- Domenico Serraino and his brother Paolo Serraino (Reggio Calabria)
- Giovanni Tegano (Reggio Calabria)
- Luigi Ursino (Gioiosa Ionica)

== Operation Crimine ==
In July 2010, in a massive police operation dubbed "Il crimine", the head of the crimine, Domenico Oppedisano was arrested. In the course of the investigation the capo crimine also appeared to be the nominal head of the Provincia. Oppedisano represented the Tyrrhenian mandamento, while his No. 2, the Capo società Antonino Latella represented the Centre (the city of Reggio Calabria) and Bruno Gioffré, the Mastro generale, the Ionic side.

The existence of the Provincia was confirmed when in March 2010, the police managed to place a bug in the home of Giuseppe Pelle, an emerging boss and son of Antonio Pelle, also known as Ntoni Gambazza. In just over a month hundreds of meetings were recorded between mafiosi, politicians, entrepreneurs, professionals, businessmen and middlemen of any kind, and even people with links to intelligence services. They also confirmed that Rocco Morabito and Giuseppe Pelle had succeeded their fathers and were in charge of managing the affairs of the 'Ndrangheta clans on the Ionic side of Calabria before they were arrested in April 2010 as a result of Operation Reale (Royal).

The pentito Roberto Moio said in April 2011 that Rocco Filippone from Melicucco headed the Tyrrhenian side, Antonio Barbaro from Platì the Ionic side, and Pasquale Condello represented Reggio Calabria.

To govern the 'Ndrangheta locali outside Calabria a so-called Camera di controllo is constituted. The investigation confirmed the existence of a Camera di controllo in Lombardy and Liguria.

== Outside Italy ==
A Camera di Controllo also exists in Canada, according to "confidential information" of the police "which they believe to be reliable." It consists of six or seven Toronto-area men, who co-ordinate activities and resolves disputes among the Siderno Group in Southern Ontario. In 1962, Michele Racco, Giacomo Luppino and Rocco Zito established a crimini or Camera di Controllo in Canada. The Toronto-area Siderno group has included the Coluccio, Tavernese, DeMaria, Figliomeni, Ruso, and Commisso crime families; Carmine Verduci before his death, and Cosimo Stalteri before his death.

During a March 2018 trial of 'Ndrangheta members in the Greater Toronto Area in Canada, an agreed Statement of Fact indicated that "the Locali [local cells] outside of Calabria replicate the structure from Calabria, and are connected to their mother-Locali in Calabria. The authority to start Locali outside Calabria comes from the governing bodies of the organization in Calabria. The Locali outside of Calabria are part of the same 'Ndrangheta organization as in Calabria, and maintain close relationships with the Locali where its members come from." The group's activities in the Greater Toronto Area were controlled by a group known as the 'Camera Di Controllo' (also known as La Provincia, according to the statement) which "makes all of the final decisions", according to the witness' testimony.

By mid-2019, Police in Italy and in Canada were convinced that "the 'Ndrangheta's Canadian presence has become so powerful and influential that the board north of Toronto has the authority to make decisions, not only in relation to Canada's underworld, but also abroad, even back in Siderno".
