= Salvatore Pelle =

Salvatore Pelle (Italian pronunciation: [salvaˈtoːre ˈpɛlle]; born December 4, 1957, in San Luca), also known as Sarvu Gambazza ("Salvo Bad Leg") is an Italian criminal and a member of the 'Ndrangheta, a Mafia-type organisation in Calabria.

He was born in San Luca in Calabria and is the eldest of the four sons of Antonio Pelle, also known as Ntoni Gambazza, the head of the 'Ndrangheta locale of San Luca and the capo crimine, the ceremonial head of the 'Ndrangheta.

He was a fugitive since 1991 and included on the list of most wanted fugitives in Italy for international drug trafficking and mafia association, until his arrest on March 10, 2007, in Reggio Calabria. He was sentenced to 11 years for international drug trafficking. While on the run, he only used trains and buses, and did not own a mobile phone to avoid being detected.

In the 1990s, he was involved in importing tonnes of hashish for the Pelle and Romeo clans in San Luca from Lebanon with Georges Semaan, a Lebanese arms and drug trafficker. Loads were delivered in Apulia and Calabria, with the help of the Sacra Corona Unita and Giuseppe Morabito, the 'Ndrangheta boss from Africo, and Salvatore Pisano.

After the death of his father in November 2009, he became the nominal head of the clan. His younger brother Giuseppe Pelle actively tried to get Salvatore transferred from the Rebibbia prison in Rome to one close to his hometown. Prior to the regional elections of March 2010 politicians visited the house of Giuseppe Pelle offering favourable treatment for Salvatore and public works contracts if his brother would deliver votes, which he did. However, before the ploy could work, Giuseppe Pelle and politicians and doctors involved were arrested.
