= Rinascita-Scott Trial =

- Court: Court of Vibo Valentia
- Decided: November 2023 (first instance)

The Rinascita-Scott Trial (Italian: Processo Rinascita-Scott) is an ongoing criminal trial against the 'Ndrangheta. The trial concerns over 330 mafiosi indicted for a variety of crimes. Proceedings have taken place in a specially constructed bunker in Lamezia Terme.

The first instance of the trial concluded in November 2023 with over 200 convictions.

== Background ==
An investigation into the 'Ndrangheta's activities began in 2016, when Nicola Gratteri was appointed prosecutor of Catanzaro.

The investigation culminated on December 19, 2019 with Operation Rinascita-Scott, a series of raids across Italy, Germany, Switzerland, and Bulgaria. Around 3000 officers participated in the raids and more than 300 arrests were made. Among the arrested were former senator Giancarlo Pittelli and several members of the Mancuso 'ndrina, a Mafia clan primarily based in Vibo Valentia.

The operation was named after Scott Sieben, a DEA agent who worked against organized crime in Italy for eight years.

== Trial ==
The trial began in January 2021. Charges included murder, drug trafficking, extortion, and money laundering. Over 400 lawyers represented the defendants and 900 witnesses were involved. A panel of three judges delivered the verdict on November 20, 2023, acquitting over 100 defendants, and sentencing over 200.

The appeals process will take place at the Catanzaro Court of Appeal.

== See also ==
- 1960s Sicilian Mafia trials
- Maxi Trial
