= Sebastiano Pelle =

Italian criminal

- Born: August 7, 1954 (age 72); San Luca, Reggio Calabria, Italy
- Convictions: Drug and weapon trafficking
- Penalty: 14 years

Sebastiano Pelle (Italian pronunciation: [sebaˈstjaːno ˈpɛlle]; born August 7, 1954) is an Italian criminal belonging to the 'Ndrangheta, a Mafia-type organization in Calabria (Italy). His name was on the Italian Interior ministry's list of most wanted fugitives in Italy, until his arrest on November 9, 2011, in Reggio Calabria.

== Background ==
Pelle was born in San Luca, Calabria. He is a nephew of Antonio Pelle, the patriarch of the San Luca locale and the 'Ndrangheta capo crimine, the titular head of the organisation, although with little effective power. According to investigators, Sebastiano Pelle had returned to San Luca to take over when his uncle died in November 2009.

He was wanted since 1995 for membership of a criminal association aimed at trafficking weapons and drugs internationally, as well as for other crimes. Pelle has been sentenced to 14 years in prison. In 2006, investigations were extended internationally for his extradition. Pelle spent years abroad managing the cocaine trade for the San Luca clans.

== See also ==
- List of fugitives from justice who disappeared
