= Giuseppe Nirta (born 1913) =

Giuseppe Nirta (Italian pronunciation: [dʒuˈzɛppe ˈnirta]; March 1, 1913 in San Luca – March 19, 1995), was a historical boss of the 'Ndrangheta, a Mafia-type organisation in Calabria. He hailed from San Luca in Calabria. Together with his brothers Antonio, Francesco and Sebastiano, he ruled the town, a stronghold of the 'Ndrangheta.

Nirta was one of the most important figures of the 'Ndrangheta. He is described as one of the senior members of the Calabrian "provincial commission". He was a member of the highest level of the clan, the "maggiore". Since the mid-1970s, according to several pentiti, members of the Nirta family, the Piromalli 'ndrina from Gioia Tauro rotated among themselves the position of capo crimine, the elected boss of the crimine, an annual meeting of the 'Ndrangheta.

He was arrested in September 1992, together with 33 others during Operation Aspromonte. Because of his advanced age he was granted house arrest. Before he could stand trial, however, he was killed on March 19, 1995, at his home in Bianco, with five bullets in the head.
