= Piserà 'ndrina =

- Founding location: Tropea. Calabria, Italy
- Years active: 1980s-present
- Territory: Tropea
- Ethnicity: Calabrians
- Allies: Mancuso 'ndrina
- Rivals: La Rosa 'ndrina

The Piserà 'ndrina are a clan of the 'Ndrangheta, a criminal and mafia-type organisation in Calabria, Italy. Based in Tropea, they are allied with the Mancuso 'ndrina. Since the 1990s, they are in a feud with the La Rosa 'ndrina, also from Tropea.

== History ==
On 19 September 1982, Pasquale Piserà, a municipal councilor of Tropea, was killed. Two months later, his brother was also killed. On 29 June 1984 an operation was concluded which arrested 40 people attributable to the following 'ndrine: Mancuso, Pesce, Fiammingo, Fazzari and Piserà.

== Prominent members ==
- Pasquale Piserà (? - 1982), worked as a truck driver, was convicted of crimes against property, president of the Tropea football team and municipal councilor of the municipality; he was killed on 19 September 1982 in his car in the square of the railway station.
- Francesco Piserà, was sentenced in 2007 in the Dynasty trial, which resulted from the homonymous operation which ended in 2003, to 12 years in prison.
