= Luigi Mancuso =

Italian mobster (born 1954)

- Born: 16 March 1954 (age 72); Limbadi, Italy
- Occupation: Crime boss
- Allegiance: Mancuso 'ndrina/'Ndrangheta

Luigi Mancuso (born 16 March 1954) is an Italian mobster belonging to the 'Ndrangheta in Calabria. Nicknamed, U Signurino ("The Uncle"), he is the boss of the Locale di Limbadi and the Mancuso 'ndrina.

== Biography ==
=== Early life ===
Mancuso is the youngest of the eleven children of Giuseppe Mancuso known as "Don Peppe", progenitor of the clan of the same name and founder. One of his brothers is Francesco Mancuso, the boss who led to the success of the clan during the 70s and 80s, being elected mayor of Limbadi in 1985 as a fugitive.

=== Criminal career ===
Mancuso climbed to the top quickly, finding himself in charge of the family in the early 1990s. According to the repentant Franco Pino, in 1992 there was a meeting between the bosses of Cosa Nostra and the bosses of the 'Ndrangheta, to discuss a common front in the fight against the state, and in this meeting, among those present, was also Mancuso himself.

In June 1993, Mancuso was arrested, at the age of 39, in the Tirreno operation, which saw a 30-year sentence for the boss, for various crimes. From '98 to 2010 he was detained under the 41bis regime, but in 2012 in Vibo Valentia there were many feuds, and the Mancusos made all their contacts to get their boss Luigi freed in July 2012, the only one who with his authority could put an end to the new Boschi feud and that of Stefanaconi, and effectively the boss imposed his authority, taking up the role of boss again, but increasing in prestige throughout Calabria, being referred to several times as capocrimine. Mancuso began to weave deals on extortion, the largest and most important public contracts for the whole of Italy, drug trafficking, oil deals, money laundering in companies and stock exchange shares, the control of agriculture and fraud in the European Union. He also weaved knowledge everywhere, in deviant freemasonry, in entrepreneurship, in law and in politics.

Following the declarations of some repentants, including Andrea Mantella, the Rinascita-Scott operation was launched on 19 December 2019 in which among those arrested there was also Luigi Mancuso, arrested together with 334 people believed to be associated with the 'Ndrangheta.

== See also ==
- List of members of the 'Ndrangheta
