= Francesco Pelle =

Italian mobster (born 1977)

- Born: 4 February 1977 (age 49); Locri, Italy
- Criminal status: Imprisoned
- Parent: Domenico Pelle
- Allegiance: Pelle 'ndrina / 'Ndrangheta

Francesco Pelle (Italian pronunciation: [franˈtʃesko ˈpɛlle]; born 4 February 1977), nicknamed Ciccio Pakistan, is an Italian mobster belonging to the Pelle 'ndrina of the 'Ndrangheta in Calabria. Until his arrest in 2021, Pelle was considered to be one of the most dangerous and wanted fugitives in Italy.

== Biography ==
Pelle is the son of Domenico Pelle known as Micu 'U Mata, according to investigators, Ciccio Pakistan was the protagonist in the San Luca feud, the war between the Pelle-Vottari against the Nirta-Strangio. Pelle is accused of having ordered the Maria Strangio's murder, who fell shot dead by the Pelle-Vottari killers in 2006 Christmas shooting, whose target was the husband Giovanni Luca Nirta, head of the rival 'ndrina who survived the attack. It would be a response to the ambush, which occurred in July earlier, on the day of his son's birth, in which he was shot in the back, leaving him unable to walk. Revenge of the Nirta came in 2007 during the Duisburg massacre, where six people believed to be close to the Pelle were killed.

== Capture and aftermath ==
In 2008, Pelle was arrested in a hospital in Pavia. Then in 2014, he was sentenced to life in prison. In 2018, Ciccio Pakistan was released from prison and was subjected to the obligation of residence in Milan pending the sentence, but following the confirmation of the life sentence he becomes a fugitive again. In March 2021, he was recaptured at a hospital in Lisbon, Portugal, where he was receiving treatment for COVID-19, and then was extradited to Italy in September.

== See also ==
- List of members of the 'Ndrangheta
- List of most wanted fugitives in Italy
