= Bonamici =

Bonamici is an Italian surname. Notable people with the surname include:

- Filippo Bonamici alias Fil Bo Riva (born 1992), Italian musician
- Suzanne Bonamici (born 1954), American politician

== See also ==
- Bonamico (disambiguation)
- Buonamici
