= Vincenzo Pesce =

Vincenzo Pesce (Rosarno, 27 May 1959), also known as Cenzo, is an Italian criminal and a member of the 'Ndrangheta, a Mafia-type organisation in Calabria. He is based in Rosarno and heads the Pesce 'ndrina.

The son of Francesco Pesce, a historical boss of the clan, he heads the family with his brothers Antonio, Giuseppe, Rocco and Salvatore Pesce. When he was released from prison in 2008, he took over command of the clan, despite opposition by his nephew Francesco Pesce, known as "Cicciu testuni" and the son of the boss Antonino Pesce, who has been in jail since 1993.

He was an important power behind the decision to appoint Domenico Oppedisano as capo crimine – the ceremonial head of the 'Ndrangheta – in August 2009. The election of Oppedisano had not been easy. Giuseppe Pelle aspired to replace his ailing father Antonio Gambazza Pelle as capo crimine and keep the title in San Luca at the risk of triggering a conflict between clans. However, Vincenzo Pesce felt that the nomination of Pelle would distort the equilibrium in the 'Ndrangheta and threatened to form a separate organization taking some 30 locali – local 'Ndrangheta organisations – with him. As a result, Oppedisano became the capo crimine instead of Pelle.

On 28 April 2010, the clan was hit in a police operation, known as Operation All Inside, that led to the arrest of 30 people accused of Mafia association, including Vincenzo Pesce. On 20 September 2011, at the All Inside trial, he was sentenced to 20 years in prison.
