= Antonio Nirta =

Italian criminal (1919–2015)

- Born: 22 April 1919; San Luca, Kingdom of Italy
- Died: 1 September 2015 (aged 96); Benestare, Italy
- Allegiance: 'Ndrangheta

Antonio Nirta (22 April 1919 – 1 September 2015) was a boss of the 'Ndrangheta, a Mafia-type organization, in the Italian region of Calabria. Together with his brothers Giuseppe, Francesco, and Sebastiano, he ruled San Luca, a stronghold of the 'Ndrangheta.

== Early criminal career ==
In 1935, at the age of 16, Nirta was already charged for coercion with the use of arms. In 1953, authorities considered him a danger for public order. By 1967, he was charged with criminal association, extortion, and attempted murder.

In October 1969, Nirta participated in the infamous Montalto meeting near the Sanctuary of Our Lady of Polsi in the municipality of San Luca. The meeting was interrupted by the police, and was intended to discuss the future operation of the 'Ndrangheta and whether or not the organization would back the Golpe Borghese, a planned right-wing coup attempt by Junio Valerio Borghese, which fizzled out on the night of 8 December 1970. The court in Locri sentenced Nirta to two years and seven months for criminal association because of his attendance of the meeting.

== 'Ndrangheta in San Luca ==
The historical pre-eminence of the San Luca family within the 'Ndrangheta is such that every new group or locale must obtain its authorization to operate, and every group belonging to the 'Ndrangheta "still has to deposit a small percentage of illicit proceeds to the principale of San Luca as a tribute of sorts, in recognition of the latter's primordial supremacy". In the words of a study published in 2005 by Italy's domestic intelligence service, San Luca is "the cradle of [the 'Ndrangheta] and its epicentre".

Since the mid-1970s, according to several pentiti, members of the Nirta family from San Luca and the Piromalli family from Gioia Tauro rotated among themselves the position of capo crimine. Nirta and his brothers belonged to the high level of the organization, the maggiore.

== Mafia mediator ==
Nirta was known as the diplomat of the clan. He mediated the peace between the Paolo De Stefano and the Antonio Imerti–Pasquale Condello clans in the Second 'Ndrangheta war that raged from 1985 to 1991 and left some 600 dead. Nirta vouched for the De Stefanos, while Antonio Mammoliti vouched for the Imerti clan. He became a member of Camera di Controllo, a provincial commission of the 'Ndrangheta formed at the end of the war in September 1991, to avoid further internal conflicts. In 1993, the old patriarch Nirta again imposed a peace in the San Luca feud, a war between the two clans Pelle-Vottari-Romeo and Strangio-Nirta from San Luca that had started in 1991. with the help of the De Stefano clan from Reggio Calabria, which held for some time.

On 8 August 1993, Nirta was arrested in the small town of Benestare. He died at home on 1 September 2015; he was 96.

== Bibliography ==
- Paoli, Letizia (2003). Mafia Brotherhoods: Organized Crime, Italian Style. Oxford/New York: Oxford University Press. ISBN 0-19-515724-9.
