= Giuseppe Pelle =

Italian criminal

Giuseppe Pelle (Italian pronunciation: [dʒuˈzɛppe ˈpɛlle]; born 20 August 1960) is an Italian criminal from San Luca, and member of the 'Ndrangheta, a Mafia-type organisation in Calabria. He is the son of Antonio Pelle, also known as Ntoni Gambazza, the capo crimine, the ceremonial head of the 'Ndrangheta.

== 'Ndrangheta heritage ==
Giuseppe was the second-born son of the undisputed leader of one of the most powerful clans of San Luca, Antonio Pelle and Giuseppa Giampaolo. His older brother Salvatore Pelle, wanted by the authorities since 1991, was arrested on March 10, 2007, making Giuseppe the acting boss of the clan. One of the four sons of Antonio Pelle, Giuseppe married Marianna Barbaro, a daughter of the ‘Ndrangheta boss Francesco Barbaro from Platì, securing a tight alliance between these two powerful 'ndrine.

In March 2010, the police managed to place a bug in the home of Pelle. "In the house they talked about the 'Ndrangheta twelve hours a day," according to prosecutor Nicola Gratteri, "they felt safe and discussed freely." In just over a month hundreds of meetings were recorded between mafiosi, politicians, entrepreneurs, professionals, businessmen and middlemen of any kind, and even people with links to intelligence services.

The conversations confirmed the existence of La Provincia, a provincial commission of the 'Ndrangheta, formed at the end of the Second 'Ndrangheta war in September 1991 to avoid further internal conflicts. They also confirmed that Giuseppe Pelle had succeeded his father and that he was in charge of managing the affairs of the 'Ndrangheta clans on the Ionic side (the Aspromonte mountains and Locride) of Calabria, together with Rocco Morabito, who had succeeded his father Giuseppe Morabito 'u tiradrittu'. (Other so-called mandamenti are those for the Tyrrhenian side (the plains of Gioia Tauro) and one central mandamento for the city of Reggio Calabria)

The conversations also revealed talks with the politician Santi Zappalà, a member of former Italian prime minister Silvio Berlusconi’s conservative People of Freedom party and part of the Regional Council of Calabria. Politicians running for office in regional elections held in March 2010 visited the house of Giuseppe Pelle, offering favourable treatment for 'Ndrangheta inmates and public works contracts if he would deliver votes. Zappala turned out to be the second most voted candidate in the province of Reggio and fourth in the region of Calabria. In December 2010 he was arrested.

== Aspiring to become capo crimine ==
Giuseppe Pelle aspired to replace his ailing father Antonio Gambazza Pelle as capo crimine and keep the title in San Luca at the risk of triggering a conflict between clans. However, Vincenzo Pesce felt that the nomination of Pelle would distort the equilibrium in the 'Ndrangheta and threatened to form a separate organization taking some 30 locali – local 'Ndrangheta organisations – with him. As a result, Domenico Oppedisano became the capo crimine instead of Pelle.

In August 2009 Oppedisano was appointed capo crimine at a marriage of Elisa Pelle, the daughter of Giuseppe Pelle, and Giuseppe Barbaro, the scion of the eponymous Barbaro 'ndrina from Platì. The marriage was attended by 2,000 people.

== Arrest ==
Giuseppe Pelle was arrested on April 22, 2010, as a result of Operation Reale (Royal), together with 8 others, including two of his brothers, Domenico and Sebastiano, and his son. Rocco Morabito was able to escape but was arrested a few days later.

In January 2012, Giuseppe Pelle, his son Antonio and his wife Marianna Barbaro were arrested again for faking depression to stay out of jail. Two doctors and a lawyer were also arrested for providing falsified documents claiming Pelle was suffering from psychiatric conditions “incompatible with detention.” In July 2012, he received another arrest warrant while in prison, together with his mother Giuseppa Giampaolo and his brothers Domenico and Sebastiano Pelle and 22 others, for illicit trafficking and aiding his father while he was a fugitive.
