= Mancuso 'ndrina =

Clan of the 'Ndrangheta

- Founded: 1970s
- Founding location: Limbadi, Calabria, Italy
- Years active: 1970s-present
- Territory: Limbadi and Nicotera in Calabria; Presence also in Lombardy, Piedmont, Lazio, Tuscany and Emilia-Romagna
- Ethnicity: Calabrians
- Allies: Piromalli 'ndrina Bellocco 'ndrina Pesce 'ndrina La Rosa 'ndrina

The Mancuso 'ndrina is a clan of the 'Ndrangheta, a criminal and mafia-type organisation in Calabria, Italy. The 'ndrina is based in Limbadi and Nicotera and is considered by the investigative bodies as the most influential clan in the province of Vibo Valentia.

They also have influences in the Metropolitan City of Reggio Calabria thanks to the alliance with the Piromalli of Gioia Tauro and the Pesce of Rosarno, contacts with the Torcasio-Giampà group and in the Crotone area where they have links with the Arena 'ndrina of Isola di Capo Rizzuto. They have contacts with the Cosa Nostra families, and historically with the Colombian FARC and the United Self-Defense Forces of Colombia (AUC).

In northern Italy they are present in the northern hinterland of Milan, in particular in Monza, Novara and in the municipalities of Giussano, Seregno, Verano Brianza and Mariano Comense, they are also present in Piedmont (Turin) and Emilia-Romagna (Parma and Bologna), while in central Italy they are present in Lazio and Tuscany. The 'ndrina is also active abroad in particular in Togo, where it takes care of its main criminal activity in Africa, representing the new logistic center for the international trafficking of cocaine.

The Mancuso 'ndrina has been defined by Giuseppe Lumia, the former president of the Antimafia Commission, as the most financially powerful clan in Europe.

== Criminal activities ==
The main criminal business of the clan is the international drug trafficking as confirmed by the very important police operation "Takeoff" in 2004, the report of the Minister of the Interior of the DIA year 2008 declares: "The Mancusos operate in the prosperous the cocaine trafficking sector, where they managed to acquire considerable weight, securing a privileged channel with the Colombian cartels, with the Spanish drug traffickers, reaching as far as Australia", followed by extortion, usury; The public procurement sector is also very important for the clan, so much so that a report on the health of Vibonese by the Guardia di Finanza in 2007 stated: "The influence of the Mancusos was also evident in the sector of public works awarded through contracts; this has given them the typical characteristics of a mafia formation with a high economic-financial vocation"; the 'ndrina also practices laundering of its illicit proceeds, particularly in the hotel tourism context, as stated in the report of the interior minister to parliament on the activities of the DIA in 2007; the criminal consortium also managed to infiltrate the public administration, in fact the dissolution of the municipal council of Nicotera in 2010 is also due to the influence exercised by the 'ndrina and its connections with administrators and municipal employees as shown in the report of the prefect of Vibo Valentia attached to the dissolution decree.

== Structure ==
According to the pentito Andrea Mantella, some members of the Mancuso 'ndrina possess the dowry of "medaglione", one of the top qualities in the ' Ndrangheta's hierarchy. According to the results of the Rinascita-Scott investigation of 2019, the pentito Luigi Bonaventura states that during a meeting in Polsi, the Locale of Limbadi, of which the Mancusos belong to and are hegemonic, has been recognized by the Crimine and therefore all the other Locali and of Vibo Valentia would have had a secondary role. Also from the investigations that took place between 2014 and 2017, it became clear the apical role of Luigi Mancuso in the 'Ndrangheta's hierarchy in the Tyrrhenian area, thus deducing that the Mancusos and therefore the Limbadi locale are part of the "Mandamento tirrenico", a territorial superstructure of the 'Ndrangheta which acts as a connecting body between the Crimine above and the underlying Locali that exist in the province of Reggio Calabria, Gioia Tauro and the Tyrrhenian area.

== Historical leaders ==
- Francesco Mancuso, known as "Don Ciccio", (1929–1997). — In 1983 he was mayor of Limbadi.
- Antonio Mancuso, known as "Zio Ntoni", (1938). Son of "Don Peppe" (1902). — Considered one of the charismatic leaders of the 'ndrina.
- Pantaleone Mancuso, known as "Scarpuni", (1961). Son of "Don Turi" (Chief of the armed wing). — Detained in the Badu 'e Carros prison, and subjected to the prison regime of the article 41-bis.
- Cosmo Mancuso, known as "Zio Michele", (1949). Son of "Don Peppe" (1902). — At the head of one of the 3 branches into which the Mancuso family split. He was arrested on April 12, 2019.
- Francesco Mancuso, known as "Zio Ciccio" or "Tabacco", (1957). — Son of "Don Mico" (1927). At the head of one of the 3 branches into which the Mancuso family split.
- Luigi Mancuso, known as "Zio Luigi" or "U Signurino", (1954). — Considered the number one of the "Locale of Limbadi", among the most powerful bosses, nationally and internationally, arrested in June 1993 and released from prison in July 2012 with 11 years in advance. Rearrested on December 19, 2019, in the Rinascita-Scott operation in which it is discovered that since 2012 he was reuniting his family and working as a peacemaker throughout the Vibo Valentia area. The affiliate Giovanni Giamborino, intercepted, speaks of him as: "Luigi does not need to ask who is in Nicotera, Reggio or this or other. He has the roof of the world: if there is someone, it is always him at the top of all." According to the pentito Virgiglio, Luigi Mancuso is also defined "one of the three points of the star" which also includes Giuseppe Piromalli and Antonino Pesce. It would also seem that from 2014 to 2017 Luigi Mancuso had a leading role in the "Mandamento tirrenico".
- Giuseppe Mancuso, known as "Zio Peppe" or "Mbrogghja", (1949). Son of "Don Mico" (1927). — Serving 30 years in prison, for murder, drug trafficking and mafia association.
- Diego Mancuso, known as "Mazzola", (1953). Son of "Don Mico" (1927).
- Pantaleone Mancuso, known as Zio Luni or "L'ingegnere", (1961). Son of "Don Mico" (1927). — Arrested in 2019.
- Pantaleone Mancuso, known as "Don Luni" or "Vetrinetta", (1947–2015). Son of "Don Peppe" (1902) — Considered a key person for the connection between the Mancuso 'ndrina and the Freemasonry. Died in prison in 2015.
