= Rocco Morabito (mobster, born 1960) =

Rocco Morabito (Italian pronunciation: [ˈrɔkko moˈraːbito]; born 23 November 1960) is an Italian criminal from Bova Marina, and member of the 'Ndrangheta, a Mafia-type organisation in Calabria. He is the son of Giuseppe Morabito, also known as Tiradrittu, the head of the Morabito 'ndrina in Africo, and succeeded him as the head of the clan after his father had been arrested in February 2004.

== 'Ndrangheta mediator ==
Morabito is seen as a diplomatic broker, a "peacemaker" in the interest and for the good of the 'Ndrangheta clans, in addition to driving the powerful and well-networked underworld faction of Africo with tentacles in different regions of Northern Italy and especially in Lombardy.

His role as mediator became clear when in March 2010, the police managed to place a bug in the home of Giuseppe Pelle, another emerging boss and son of Antonio Pelle, also known as Ntoni Gambazza, the capo crimine, the ceremonial head of the 'Ndrangheta. In just over a month hundreds of meetings were recorded between mafiosi, politicians, entrepreneurs, professionals, businessmen and middlemen of any kind, and even people with links to intelligence services.

The conversations confirmed the existence of Camera di Controllo, a provincial commission of the 'Ndrangheta, formed at the end of the Second 'Ndrangheta war in September 1991 to avoid further internal conflicts. They also confirmed that Rocco Morabito and Giuseppe Pelle had succeeded their fathers and were in charge of managing the affairs of the 'Ndrangheta clans on the Ionic side (the Aspromonte mountains and Locride) of Calabria. (Other so-called mandamenti are those for the Tyrrhenian side (the plains of Gioia Tauro) and one central mandamento for the city of Reggio Calabria)

As a result of the bugs, Giuseppe Pelle was arrested on 22 April 2010, in an operation dubbed Reale (Royal), together with eight others, including his sons. Morabito was able to escape but was arrested a few days later on 26 April 2010, in Melito di Porto Salvo, while he was visiting his sister.
