= Rocco Morabito =

Rocco Morabito may refer to:

- Rocco Morabito (mobster, born 1960), Italian criminal and member of the 'Ndrangheta
- Rocco Morabito (mobster, born 1966), Italian criminal and member of the 'Ndrangheta
- Rocco Morabito (photographer), American photographer
