= Giuseppe Morabito =

Italian criminal

- Mugshot of 'Ndrangheta boss Giuseppe Morabito
- Born: 15 August 1934 (age 91); Africo, Kingdom of Italy
- Other name: 'u tiradrittu ("the straightshooter")
- Allegiance: Morabito 'ndrina / 'Ndrangheta

Giuseppe Morabito (Italian pronunciation: [dʒuˈzɛppe moˈraːbito]; born 15 August 1934), nicknamed 'u tiradrittu ("the straight shooter"), is an Italian criminal and a historical boss of the 'Ndrangheta, a Mafia-type organisation in the region of Calabria, in southern Italy. He hails from Africo in the Locride. He was a fugitive and on the list of most wanted fugitives in Italy from 1992 until his arrest in February 2004.

== 'Ndrangheta boss ==
Morabito is an important figure of the 'Ndrangheta. During the Second 'Ndrangheta war (1985–1991) in Calabria, he allegedly chaired the meetings that were held annually at the Sanctuary of Our Lady of Polsi and, later, in Africo. He is described as one of the senior members of Camera di Controllo, a provincial commission of the 'Ndrangheta formed at the end of the Second 'Ndrangheta war in September 1991, to avoid further internal conflicts, i.e. the body that reproduces the well-known Sicilian Mafia Commission.

When he was arrested in February 2004, Roberto Centaro – the president of the Parliamentary Antimafia Commission – said the capture was even more important than that of Sicilian Mafia boss Bernardo Provenzano. According to several pentiti, Sicilian Mafia boss Totò Riina was sheltered by Morabito, while Riina was on the run. According to the special Antimafia police – the Direzione Investigativa Antimafia (DIA) – his influence within the 'Ndrangheta appears to be quite similar to Provenzano's influence within the Sicilian Cosa Nostra.

== Early years ==
His first troubles with the criminal justice system were in 1952 for illegally occupying and damaging a building, unlawful possession of arms and violence against persons. In 1967, he was accused of being the principal behind the Locri massacre in which three members of a rival clan were killed, but he was acquitted for lack of evidence in 1971.

At the end of the 1980s, Morabito became the head of the 'Ndrangheta locale of Africo after the so-called Motticella feud between the Morabito-Mollica clan and the Speranza-Palamara-Scriva clan, all from Africo. In 1989, he challenged the chief of the national police Vincenzo Parisi to investigate him, declaring he was innocent. An official brought the notice to Parisi while he visited the court in Locri in the midst of a meeting about an emergency of kidnappings in Calabria. Morabito became a fugitive in 1992 after an indictment for drug trafficking.

== 'Ndrangheta cell in Sicily ==
The Morabito clan established a 'Ndrangheta cell in Messina on Sicily - across the Strait of Messina opposite Calabria. Up to the late 1970s, criminal gangs in Messina were under the influence of the 'Ndrangheta. Only later, the Sicilian Cosa Nostra established an organisation of its own in Messina and its province by including the local Calabrian Mafia-type structure. The whole process took place without any conflict and there is reason to believe that the Mafia infiltration in the Messina area took place after agreements made between the leaders of the two organisations.

The Morabitos exercise considerable power in Messina up to the present. The clan turned the University of Messina into their private fiefdom, ordering that degrees, academic posts and influence be awarded to favoured associates. Friends or relatives of politicians were the beneficiaries whom the clan wished to cultivate. Before a police crackdown in June 2001, two professors had been kneecapped by unknown assailants, four bombs exploded in university buildings and the cars of several academics were set on fire. Lecturers were threatened before examinations by students claiming mafia-type backing.

== Drug trafficking ==
Morabito put together a joint venture of 'Ndrangheta clans, among which the Barbaro family from Platì, the Pelle family from San Luca, but also the Pisano-Pesce-Bellocco clan from Rosarno, on the Tyrrhenian coast of Calabria. Connections between the Morabito clan and Mafiosi of the Catania area were established during criminal investigations concerning drug trafficking. Connections with the Mafia in Mazara del Vallo in the province of Trapani headed by Mariano Agate were used to import hashish from Morocco and cocaine from Latin America. He was also involved in smuggling hashish from Lebanon.

Between 1996 and 1997, the "new Balkan mafias" began to play a "dominant role" in the importing of heroin and arms trafficking, to the extent that they started supplying the 'Ndrangheta gang run by Morabito with drugs. The network, including Agim Gashi and Ismet Dedinca, enjoyed the discreet support of Italian intelligence (with which the Morabito clan was in contact) and the direct involvement of politicians (such as Ritvan Peshkepia), who enjoyed diplomatic immunity.

The Morabito-Bruzzaniti-Palamara cosca from Africo is heavily involved in cocaine trafficking through contacts in Venezuela, Colombia and Argentina. Tiradrittu’s grandson, Salvatore Morabito, looked after the interests of the clan in the north of Italy. He was arrested in Milan on 3 May 2007, along with 19 others. The police seized 250 kg of cocaine, smuggled through the fruit and vegetable wholesale market (Ortomercato) that is under control of the 'Ndrangheta. Salvatore Morabito used to arrive at the market in his Ferrari.

== Arrest ==
On 18 February 2004, Morabito was arrested along with his son-in-law, Giuseppe Pansera, another fugitive. He was armed but did not resist the police. "Treat me well", he reportedly told officers. He had been at large for 12 years, on suspicion of running an international drug smuggling ring. However, many of his relatives are still free and continue to operate thanks to the prestige of Tiradrittu. His son and successor as the head of the clan, Rocco Morabito, was arrested on 26 April 2010, in Melito di Porto Salvo, while he was visiting his sister.

Giuseppe Sculli, a former Juventus and Italy Under-21 player, is the grandson of Morabito. He was accused of match-fixing when he played for F.C. Crotone against his other former club F.C. Messina on the last match-day of the 2001-02 Serie B season.

== See also ==
- List of fugitives from justice who disappeared
