= Bonamico (river) =

Location
- Country: Italy

Physical characteristics
- Source
  - location: near Montalto
- Mouth: Ionian Sea
  - coordinates: 38.1271°N 16.1610°E

The Bonamico is an Italian river whose source is near Montalto in the Aspromonte National Park. From there, the river flows east past San Luca and into the Ionian Sea south of Bovalino.

== See also ==
- Lago Costantino
