= Ursino =

Ursino is an Italian surname. Notable people with the surname include:

- Luigi Ursino (born 1933), Italian mobster
- Luciano Ursino (born 1988), Argentina footballer
- Gennaro Ursino (1650–1715), Italian composer and teacher
