= Domenico Oppedisano =

Italian mob boss

Domenico Oppedisano (Rosarno, 5 December 1930) is an Italian criminal and a member of the 'Ndrangheta, a Mafia-type organisation in Calabria. He is based in Rosarno.

== Capo crimine ==
In August 2009 he was appointed capo crimine, the ceremonial head of the 'Ndrangheta, at a marriage of two children of bosses attended by 2,000 people. The marriage was between Elisa Pelle – the daughter of Giuseppe Pelle and granddaughter of Antonio Pelle "Gambazza", the former capo crimine from San Luca who died a few months later of natural causes – and Giuseppe Barbaro, the scion of the eponymous Barbaro 'ndrina from Platì.

Oppedisano assumed power at a banquet held at the Sanctuary of Our Lady of Polsi in September that year. In a conversation wiretapped by the police he talked of 1,000 affiliates attending the meeting.

In July 2010, Italian police arrested Oppedisano, 80 years old at the time, in a major crackdown on the 'Ndrangheta dubbed Operation Crimine, seizing assets worth millions of euros and arresting 304 people, after a nationwide two-year investigation.

According to the police, Oppedisano was "the reference point for the entire organisation". He brokered peace among factions in Calabria and divided public works contracts in northern Italy, in particular related to the Expo 2015 in Milan. Wiretaps revealed him to be a consensus seeker. "For the love of God, when you make a proposal, you listen to the others to see what they think," he typically told a 'Ndrangheta affiliate.

== Unknown to police ==
Until the start of the investigation in 2008, Oppedisano had been relatively unknown to police. The nominal head of the 'Ndrangheta drove around the town of Rosarno in a humble three-wheeled van, delivering produce from his orchard at the local market. According to police investigations the power behind Oppedisano was Vincenzo Pesce, the head of the Pesce 'ndrina in Rosarno.

The election of Oppedisano had not been easy. Giuseppe Pelle aspired to replace his ailing father Antonio Gambazza Pelle as capo crimine and keep the title in San Luca at the risk of triggering a conflict between clans. However, Vincenzo Pesce felt that the nomination of Pelle would distort the equilibrium in the 'Ndrangheta and threatened to form a separate organization taking some 30 locali – local 'Ndrangheta organisations – with him. As a result, Oppedisano became the capo crimine instead of Pelle.

On 8 March 2012 Oppedisano was sentenced to 10 years. The sentence followed a trial in the provincial capital of Reggio Calabria in which more than 90 'Ndrangheta members were also jailed and 34 acquitted. Many were convicted of Mafia association. Prosecutor Nicola Gratteri had called on Oppedisano to be jailed for 20 years.
