= Oppedisano =

Oppedisano is a surname. Notable people with the surname include:

- Domenico Oppedisano (born 1930), Italian criminal
- Marco Oppedisano (born 1971), American guitarist and composer
