= Domenico Alvaro =

Italian criminal

- Born: December 5, 1924; Sinopoli, Italy
- Died: July 25, 2010 (aged 85); Sinopoli, Italy
- Other name: 'don Micu o Giannuzzu'
- Organization: 'Ndrangheta
- Known for: Head of the Alvaro 'Ndrangheta clan, mediator in the Second 'Ndrangheta war.
- Children: 3
- Status: Arrested, died before conviction
- Criminal charges: Mafia association
- Capture status: Arrested
- Wanted by: Italian law enforcement

Details
- Country: Italy
- Locations: Sinopoli, Cosoleto
- Date apprehended: July 14, 2010

Domenico Alvaro (December 5, 1924, in Sinopoli − July 25, 2010, in Sinopoli), also known as 'don Micu o Giannuzzu', was an Italian criminal and a member of the 'Ndrangheta, a Mafia-type organisation in Calabria, a region in Southern Italy.

He became the head of the locale of Sinopoli and Cosoleto, after the arrest of Carmine Alvaro on July 18, 2005, who had succeeded the historical boss of the clan, Cosimo Alvaro (1920–2000).

He was a mediator for the 'pax mafiosa' of the Second 'Ndrangheta war – in which more than 600 people were killed – brokering a deal between the main adversaries Pasquale Condello and Giorgio De Stefano. He became a member of Camera di Controllo, a provincial commission of the 'Ndrangheta formed at the end of the war in September 1991, to avoid further internal conflicts.

He was arrested on July 14, 2010, in one of the most important and large operations against the 'Ndrangheta in Italy ever (Operation Crimine) in which more than 300 criminals were arrested. Due to his bad health, he was transferred to a hospital in Reggio Calabria and later to his home in Sinopoli, where he died of natural causes at the age of 86 on July 25, 2011.

His son Cosimo Alvaro took over the command of the clan. He was arrested on July 14, 2011. On September 4, 2013, a subsequent police operation against the clan, at the time active in Sinopoli, Sant'Eufemia d'Aspromonte, Cosoleto and Delianuova, resulted in 7 arrests, among whom were Cosimo Alvaro (already in jail) and his brother Antonio Alvaro.
