= Bonamico =

Bonamico may refer to:

== People ==
- Buonamico Buffalmacco, Italian Renaissance painter
- Ġan Franġisk Bonamico, doctor and writer of the Order of St. John
- Marco Bonamico (1957–2025), Italian basketball player

== Places ==
- Bonamico (river), the Italian river

== Other uses ==
- Bonamico, Italian wine grape from the Tuscany
