= Francesco Vottari =

Italian criminal (born 1971)

Italian police escort Vottari after his arrest in San Luca in October 2007

Francesco Vottari (born 16 July 1971 in Locri, Calabria), also known as Cicciu u Frunzu, is a boss of the 'Ndrangheta mafia-style organization from San Luca in Calabria. He is the son of Giuseppe Vottari. He is married to Maria Pelle, the daughter of Antonio Pelle, the capo crimine of the organisation.

He is one of the bosses of the Pelle-Vottari-Romeo clan, involved in a bloody feud with the Strangio-Nirta clan since 1991. Both clans are based in San Luca, and their vendetta is known as the San Luca feud. The conflict received significant public attention on 15 August 2007, when six men belonging to the Pelle-Vottari-Romeo clan were shot dead in their cars in front of a pizzeria near the train station of Duisburg in western Germany.

Italian police drastically heightened security measures in San Luca as a result, and stepped up operations against both clans. Vottari managed to avoid capture in a major police raid on San Luca two weeks after the Duisburg killings. However, he was arrested on 12 October 2007, while he tried to hide under his bed.

On 12 July 2011, the Criminal Court in Locri sentenced Vottari to life imprisonment for the Maria Strangio's killing.
