= Buonamici =

Buonamici is an Italian surname. Notable people with the surname include:

- Francesco Buonamici (disambiguation), several people
- Giovan Francesco Buonamici (1692–1759), Italian architect and painter of the Baroque period
- Giuseppe Buonamici (1846–1914), Italian composer, pianist and musicologist
- Lazarus Buonamici (1479–1552), Italian Renaissance humanist

== See also ==
- Suzanne Bonamici
