= La Rosa 'ndrina =

- Founder: Antonio La Rosa
- Founding location: Tropea, Calabria, Italy
- Years active: 1970s-present
- Territory: Tropea
- Ethnicity: Calabrians
- Allies: Mancuso 'ndrina
- Rivals: Piserà 'ndrina

The La Rosa 'ndrina are a clan of the 'Ndrangheta, a criminal and mafia-type organisation in Calabria, Italy. They are allied with the Mancuso 'ndrina of Limbadi. The La Rosa are in feud with the rival clan the Piserà 'ndrina and since the 2000s have begun a settlement in the locality of Santa Domenica di Ricadi until then ruled by the local 'ndrina of the Carones close to the Mancusos.

== Prominent members ==
- Antonio La Rosa (1962), capobastone in prison since 2009.

== Recent events ==
In Operation Odyssey, exponents of La Rosa are arrested, including Antonio La Rosa. On February 16, 2011, the Guardia di Finanza seized assets worth 6 million euros from La Rosa. On 19 December 2012, 8 alleged affiliates of La Rosa were arrested by the Vibo Valentia mobile squad for murder, extortion from Tropea tourist villages and arms trafficking. The operation shows a strong link with the Mancusos. On 20 April 2016, the Costa clean operation of the Polizia di Stato, Carabinieri and Guardia di Finanza ends against the Mancusos and in particular against the figure of the boss Pantaleone Mancuso and the Accorinti 'ndrine, La Rosa and Grande who also managed with illegal money tourist ferries to the Aeolian Islands. There was a seizure of assets of 70 million euros. The Accorintis in Briatico would then have influenced the traditional religious festival of the town which takes place every 16th of July, dedicated to the Madonna del Monte Carmelo. Finally, Andrea Niglia, president of the Province of Vibo Valentia and mayor of Briatico, is accused of external competition in the mafia association.
