= Crimine =

Annual meeting of the 'Ndrangheta

The crimine is an annual meeting of the 'Ndrangheta, a Mafia-type organisation in Calabria. The meeting is held near the Sanctuary of Our Lady of Polsi in the municipality of San Luca during the September Feast. At least since the 1950s, these annual meetings have traditionally served as a forum to discuss future strategies and settle disputes among the locali – all the 'ndrine in a specific town or territory. The assembly exercises weak supervisory powers over the activities of all 'Ndrangheta groups.

At the meeting a capo crimine is elected. Strong emphasis was placed on the temporary character of the position of the crimine boss. A new representative was elected capo crimine at each meeting. Each head of a locale is called before the crimine to give an account of all the activities carried out during the year. He also should communicate the number of new affiliates and punishments to offenders.

In July 2010, in a massive police operation dubbed "Il crimine", the head of the crimine, Domenico Oppedisano was arrested. He assumed power at a banquet held at the Sanctuary of Our Lady of Polsi in September 2009. In a conversation wiretapped by the police he talked of 1,000 affiliates attending the meeting.

In the course of the investigation the capo crimine also appeared to be the nominal head of the ‘Ndrangheta Commission, known as La Provincia.
