= Pesce 'ndrina =

- Founded: 1950s
- Founding location: Rosarno, Calabria, Italy
- Years active: 1950s-present
- Territory: Rosarno, Gioia Tauro plain, Milan
- Ethnicity: Calabrians
- Criminal activities: Racketeering, drug trafficking, extortion
- Allies: Piromalli, Bellocco and Mancuso 'ndrine

The Pesce 'ndrina is a clan of the 'Ndrangheta, a criminal and mafia-type organisation in Calabria, Italy. The 'ndrina is based in Rosarno on the Tyrrhenian coast.

== Powerful 'Ndrangheta clan ==
The Pesce clan is one of the most powerful clans in the 'Ndrangheta. Activities range from drug trafficking, extortion and the control of nearly all commercial businesses in the Gioia Tauro plain. Jointly with the Bellocco clan and in collaboration with the Piromalli-Molè 'ndrina they controlled the public contracts for the construction of the container terminal in the port of Gioia Tauro.

After the construction of the port, the Piromalli-Mole and Pesce-Bellocco clans controlled activities tied to the port, the hiring of workers, and relations with port unions and local institutions, according to a report of the Italian Antimafia Commission. They would guarantee peace and order on the docks in return for a ‘security tax’ of US$1.50 per for each transshipped container. The clan is also alleged to have secured lucrative public building contracts related to the Salerno-Reggio Calabria highway.

The Pesce clan was an important power behind the decision to appoint Domenico Oppedisano as capo crimine – the ceremonial head of the 'Ndrangheta – in August 2009. The election of Oppedisano had not been easy. Giuseppe Pelle aspired to replace his ailing father Antonio Gambazza Pelle as capo crimine and keep the title in San Luca at the risk of triggering a conflict between clans. However, Vincenzo Pesce felt that the nomination of Pelle would distort the equilibrium in the 'Ndrangheta and threatened to form a separate organization taking some 30 locali – local 'Ndrangheta organisations – with him. As a result, Oppedisano became the capo crimine instead of Pelle. At the time Pesce boasted to command some 500 affiliates.

== Leadership ==
The historical boss of the 'ndrina was Giuseppe Pesce (1923-1992), who transformed the clan from a rural criminal organisation in the service of large landholders into an entrepreneurial organisation. He also elevated the clan among the most influential 'Ndrangheta clans due to his capacity to avoid conflicts through mediation.

After the demise of Giuseppe Pesce in 1992, the clan was headed by his cousin Antonino Pesce (born in 1953) and his brother Salvatore Pesce (born in 1961), both in jail. Antonino Pesce was arrested in February 1993. Salvatore Pesce was arrested on charges of international drug trafficking on 30 November 2005. After their arrest, Antonino's son Francesco Pesce took over the command.

While in jail, Salvatore Pesce used Radio Olimpia, a local radio station that operated an unlicensed transmitter from premises in Pesce’s fiefdom Rosarno, to send coded messages. Police listening in on a conversation between Pesce and his wife heard him talking about record requests. Pesce told his wife, after scribbling down the name of a tune: "If it's positive you send me [this] song on the radio tonight. If it's negative, you send me another."

== Recent developments ==
In January 2006, 54 members of the Bellocco-Pesce clan were arrested in an operation against international drug trafficking. They were supplying the drug markets in Milan, Como, Sondrio, Brescia, Bergamo, Treviso, Alessandria, Naples and Reggio Calabria. The cocaine was imported from Colombia, Brazil, Spain and the Netherlands, heroin from the Balkans and ecstasy from the Netherlands.

On 28 April 2010, the clan was hit in a police operation, known as Operation All Inside, that led to the arrest of 30 people accused of Mafia association. Another 10 for whom arrest warrants were issued were still on the run. One of the most important bosses to escape was Francesco Pesce, known as "Cicciu testuni" and the son of Antonino, who was arrested on 9 August 2011, in the area around the port of Gioia Tauro.

On 21 April 2011, Italian police seized around 190 million euros worth of assets of the clan. Among the impounded properties were 40 businesses in the transport, agriculture and trade sectors, 44 apartments, four villas, 60 parcels of land, 164 cars and even two football teams, Interpiana and Sapri. The police was able to carry out the investigation into the highly secretive 'Ndrangheta organisation thanks to the collaboration of the pentita Giuseppina Pesce, the daughter of clan boss Salvatore Pesce. The story of Giuseppina Pesce's involvement in the investigation is told in The Good Mothers, a 2023 British-Italian crime drama television mini-series about three women inside the 'Ndrangheta who collaborated with a female prosecutor against the criminal organisation.

On 20 September 2011, 11 members of the clan were convicted at the All Inside trial. The bosses of the clan, Vincenzo Pesce and Francesco Pesce, known as "Cicciu testuni", were sentenced to 20 years in prison. The testimony of the pentita Giuseppina Pesce was an important element in the trial. She subsequently entered witness protection with her children.

On 2 February 2013, Domenico Leotta, the righthand man of Francesco Pesce was arrested in Catanzaro.

On 6 August 2026, Salvatore Pesce was released from prison by order of the Milan Appellate Court.
