= Franco Coco Trovato =

Italian criminal

- Born: 2 May 1947 (age 79); Marcedusa, Calabria, Italy
- Occupation: Crime boss
- Status: Incarcerated since 1992
- Allegiance: 'Ndrangheta
- Penalty: Life Imprisonment (1997)

Franco Coco Trovato (born 2 May 1947) is an Italian criminal and a member of the 'Ndrangheta, a Mafia-type criminal organisation in Calabria. He was one of the leading figures of an alliance of ’Ndrangheta groups operating in the Milan and Lecco areas during the 1980s and 1990s.

== Biography ==
Franco Coco Trovato was born in Marcedusa, Calabria on 2 May 1947, and moved to the province of Lecco in Lombardy in the late 1950s, where he worked as a bricklayer. From around 1960 onward, he became involved in criminal activities in Northern Italy; according to the statements of the informant Antonio Zagari, he joined a gang of robbers in which Zagari’s father, Giacomo Zagari, acted as the logistical coordinator, and whose members were all affiliated with the 'Ndrangheta. During the 1970s, he was incarcerated, and in 1974 he shared a prison cell with Antonio Zagari.

In 1981, he was being held at San Vittore Prison in Milan on suspicion of having murdered a lawyer identified as D’Agostino, a charge from which he was later acquitted on the grounds of self-defense. While in custody, he was also accused of killing a South American man; he was likewise acquitted of that charge.

In 1983, he was granted the rank of santista, a senior status within the 'Ndrangheta. A few years later, he became the head of the locale of Lecco. Coco exercised undisputed control over a wide area stretching from the Comasina in Milano to Lecco, passing through Como. During this period, he came into contact with Catania mobsters Angelo Epaminonda and Luigi "Jimmy" Miano. From 1982 onward, according to the informant Zagari, Trovato began operating in the Lecco and Como areas in drug trafficking and distribution, together with Antonino Pristeri.

He began building his criminal empire by allying himself with the Calabrian boss of the Comasina area, Giuseppe Flachi (known as “Pepè”), Antonio Papalia, head of the Papalia 'ndrina from Buccinasco, and the Batti clan of the Camorra, in order to control drug trafficking operations. He also became the owner of a chain of restaurants and pizzerias.

He ordered the killing of three members of the Arena 'ndrina in connection with drug-related disputes between 1991 and 1993; they were reportedly seeking to change suppliers and had expansionist ambitions.

Coco Trovato’s influence within the 'Ndrangheta were reinforced by close links to the De Stefano 'ndrina from Reggio Calabria. His daughter, Giuseppina, was first engaged and later married to Carmine De Stefano, the eldest son of boss Paolo De Stefano, who was killed on 13 October 1985. The alliance between the Coco Trovato and De Stefano families substantially increased their influence within the organisation. More importantly, it laid the groundwork for the formation of alliances between ’ndrine in northern Italy and those in the south, effectively establishing Milan as a central hub for the economic interests of the 'Ndrangheta.

A cooperative alliance between the ’Ndrangheta and the Camorra in the 1980s, aimed at jointly controlling drug trafficking in northern Italy, began to collapse in 1990 when the Batti clan attempted to operate independently and negotiate heroin purchases directly with Turkish suppliers. On 15 September 1990, hitmen from the Batti clan attempted to kill Coco Trovato but mistakenly killed two civilians in Bresso. In response, Trovato, together with Antonio Schettini and Giuseppe Flachi, launched a counterattack, killing Francesco Batti in Trezzano sul Naviglio. The conflict escalated after Luigi Batti’s failed mediation attempt, during which he was abducted and killed, and resulted in 11 deaths over six months. Salvatore Batti survived and fled to San Giuseppe Vesuviano to regroup, while the Calabrian faction arranged, through Schettini, an agreement with Camorra clans to eliminate him in exchange for the killing of Roberto Cutolo, son of Raffaele Cutolo, which was carried out on 19 December 1990 in Tradate. Salvatore Batti was killed shortly after, on 23 December 1990, marking the end of the conflict and the victory of Trovato’s faction. The case was later investigated in Operation Atto Finale in 2002, which led to 46 arrest warrants.

In October 1992, Franco Coco Trovato was arrested, and in 1997 he was sentenced to life imprisonment. During the operation, assets worth approximately 28 billion lire (around €14.5 million) were seized. The figure and activities of Franco Coco Trovato, who became one of the leading figures in drug trafficking and was also known for the brutality with which he eliminated rivals, were documented in the “Wall Street” investigation, conducted at the time by deputy prosecutor Armando Spataro.
