= Giuseppe Flachi =

Italian mobster (1951–2022)

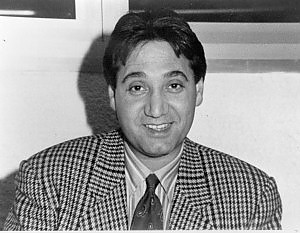
- Born: 19 October 1951; Reggio Calabria, Calabria, Italy
- Died: 22 January 2022 (aged 70); Milan, Lombardy, Italy
- Other names: Pepè
- Occupation: Crime boss
- Allegiance: 'Ndrangheta

Giuseppe Flachi (Reggio Calabria, 19 October 1951 – Milan, 20 January 2022) was an Italian criminal, a member of the 'Ndrangheta, a Mafia-type criminal organisation in Calabria, and one of the leaders of an alliance of 'Ndrangheta groups in the Milan area during the 1980s and 1990s.

Boss of the Comasina quarter in Milan, Flachi was a friend of Renato Vallanzasca and an ally of Franco Coco Trovato, a ’Ndrangheta figure active in the Lecco area and in Brianza.

== Biography ==
Giuseppe “Pepè” Flachi was born in Reggio Calabria on 19 October 1951 and migrated to Milan in the 1970s, where he became involved in a criminal environment closely linked to the 'Ndrangheta operating in the region. By the mid-1980s Flachi and his close ally Franco Coco Trovato were key representatives of the 'Ndrangheta in the Lombardy region.

In 1990, an alliance between the 'Ndrangheta and the Camorra operating in Northern Italy began to collapse when the Batti clan, of the Camorra, chose to act independently, negotiating heroin trafficking directly with Turkish criminal organizations. The breakdown of this alliance ultimately led to a conflict that lasted four years, reportedly sparked by an altercation between Franco Coco Trovato and Salvatore Batti during the wedding of Flachi. The feud resulted in a wave of violence that left at least 11 people dead, including the Batti brothers and Roberto Cutolo, son of Nuova Camorra Organizzata boss Raffaele Cutolo. The cycle of retaliatory killings also caused the deaths of innocent bystanders.

Giuseppe “Pepè” Flachi was wanted in connection with the murder of drug trafficker Felice Valente, who was killed on 15 October 1989 by his associates. He was arrested on 30 November 1991 in the French Riviera. In May 1995, he was extradited to Italy. He served his sentence, which ended on 14 March 2011.

On 26 February 2012, Flachi was again sentenced to 20 years and 4 months in prison on charges of mafia-type criminal association, illegal disposal of toxic waste, and extortion.

His criminal organization was also convicted in 16 additional cases. It was involved in extortion against Milan street food vendors, infiltration of nightclub security management, and activities in the earth-moving sector. It was also alleged that, during the 2010 Lombardy regional elections, the group redirected votes in favor of a candidate.

Suffering from cancer, for which he was treated at the Humanitas San Pio X clinic, he later developed Parkinson’s disease, from which he died on 20 January 2022, at the age of 70. His ashes were interred in the family tomb at the Bruzzano cemetery.

On 6 September 2022, his son Davide was arrested as part of the “Metropoli – Hidden Economy” operation.
