= Costantino Lake =

Lake in Calabria, Italy

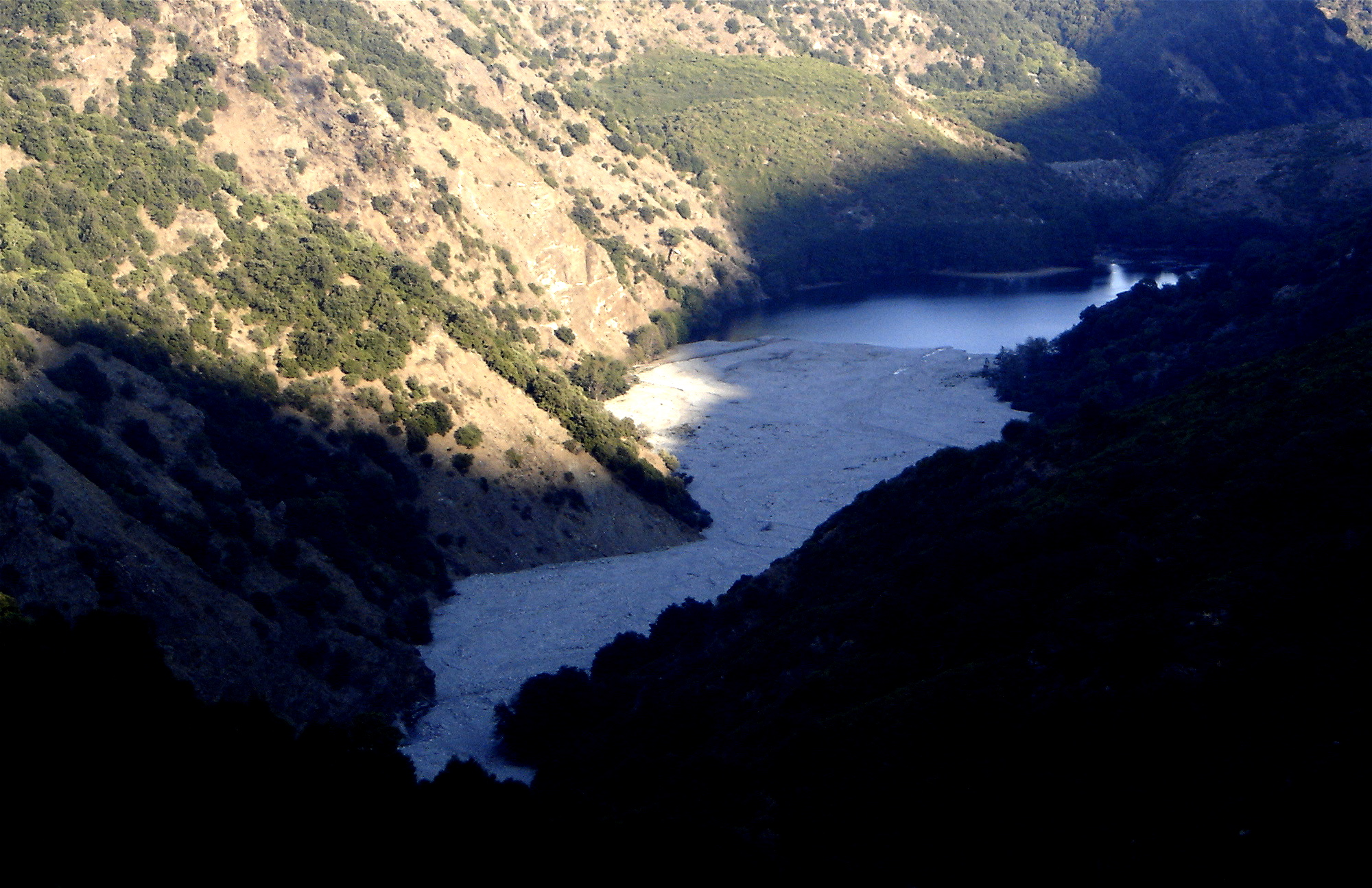
- Lago Costantino, Calabria, Italy.

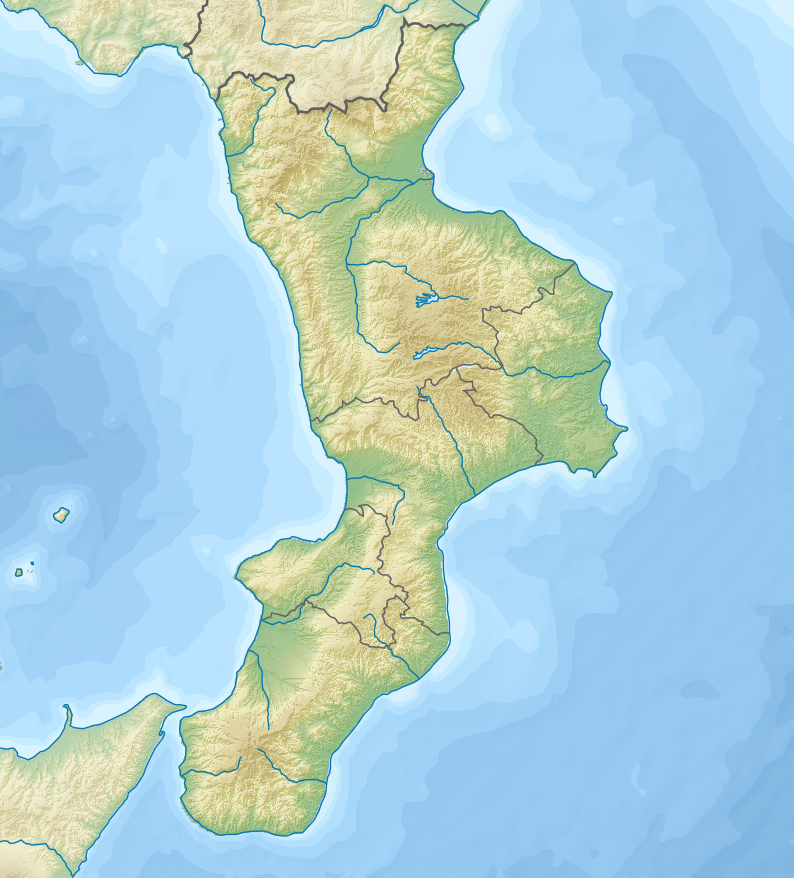
- Location within Calabria
- Location: Province of Reggio Calabria, Calabria
- Coordinates: 38°09′13″N 16°00′34″E
- Primary inflows: Fiumara Bonamico
- Primary outflows: Fiumara Bonamico
- Basin countries: Italy

Costantino Lake is a lake in the province of Reggio, Calabria, Italy.
