= Francesco Buonamici =

Francesco Buonamici may refer to:

- Francesco Buonamici (1533–1603), Italian doctor, philosopher and writer
- Francesco Buonamici (1596–1677), Italian Baroque architect, painter and engraver
- Francesco Buonamici (1836–1921), Italian lawyer and politician
- Giovan Francesco Buonamici (1692–1759), Italian Baroque architect and painter
- Giovanni Francesco Buonamici (1592–1669), Italian diplomat
