= Corrado Alvaro =

Italian journalist and writer

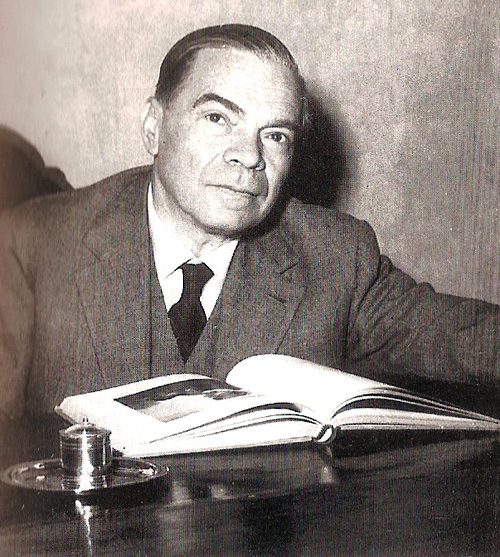
- Corrado Alvaro in the 1920s
- Born: 15 April 1895; San Luca, Italy
- Died: 11 June 1956 (aged 61); Rome, Italy
- Occupations: Journalist and writer of novels, short stories, screenplays and plays
- Writing career
- Language: Italian
- Genre: Verismo
- Notable work: Gente in Aspromonte (Revolt in Aspromonte)
- Notable awards: Strega Prize (Premio Strega) in 1951
- Website: (in Italian) Fondazione Corrado Alvaro

Corrado Alvaro (15 April 1895 – 11 June 1956) was an Italian journalist and writer of novels, short stories, screenplays and plays. He often used the verismo style to describe the hopeless poverty in his native Calabria. His first success was Gente in Aspromonte (Revolt in Aspromonte), which examined the exploitation of rural peasants by greedy landowners in Calabria, and is considered by many critics to be his masterpiece.

== Biography ==
He was born in San Luca, a small village in the southernmost region of Calabria. His father Antonio was a primary school teacher and founded an evening school for farmers and illiterate shepherds. Alvaro was educated at Jesuit boarding schools in Rome and Umbria. He graduated with a degree in literature in 1919 at the University of Milan and began working as a journalist and literary critic for two daily newspapers, Il Resto di Carlino of Bologna and the Corriere della Sera of Milan.

He served as an officer in the Italian army during World War I. After being wounded in both arms, he spent a long time in military hospitals. After the war, he worked as a correspondent in Paris (France) for the anti-Fascist paper Il Mondo of Giovanni Amendola. In 1925, he supported the Manifesto of the Anti-Fascist Intellectuals written by the philosopher Benedetto Croce.

In 1926 he published his first novel L'uomo nel labirinto (Man in the Labyrinth), which explored the growth of Fascism in Italy in the 1920s. A staunch democrat with strong anti-Fascist views, Alvaro's politics made him the target of surveillance of Mussolini's Fascist regime. He was forced to leave Italy and during the 1930s he travelled widely in western Europe, the Middle East, and the Soviet Union. Journeys he later recounted in his travel essays. L'uomo è forte (1938; Man Is Strong), written after a trip to the Soviet Union, is a defence of the individual against the oppression of totalitarianism.

After World War II Alvaro returned to Italy. He again worked for prominent daily newspapers as a special correspondent, theatre and film critic, and editor. He was elected secretary of the Italian Association of Writers in 1947, a post he held until his death in Rome in 1956. He is buried in Vallerano.

== Literary career ==
Initially, Alvaro's literary efforts did not enjoy great success. Critics praised his first novel L'uomo nel labirinto (Man in the Labyrinth) for its portrayal of alienation of individuals and society as a whole. His subsequent works, L'amata alla finestra, Gente in Aspromonte, La signora dell'isola, and Vent'anni established him as an important writer. A jury that included the noted Italian novelist Luigi Pirandello awarded him a prize of 50,000 lire given by the newspaper La Stampa in 1931 for Gente in Aspromonte.

In 1951 he won the Strega Prize (Premio Strega) – Italy's most prestigious literary award – for his novel Quasi una vita. Alvaro is noted for his realistic, epic depictions of the Italian poor. His later work portrayed the contrasts between a yearning for the simple, pastoral way of life, and the aspiration to achieve material success that attracts people to the city. He died in Rome.

He was one of the first authors to mention the 'Ndrangheta – the mafia-style criminal association in his native Calabria – in several short stories and in an article published in the Corriere della Sera in 1955.

== Works ==
- Polsi, nell'arte, nella leggenda, e nella storia (1912)
- Poesie grigioverdi (1917)
- La siepe e l'orto (1920)
- L'uomo del labirinto (1926)
- L'amata alla finestra (1929)
- Vent'anni (1930)
- Gente in Aspromonte (Revolt in Aspromonte, 1930. Won the prize of the newspaper La Stampa in 1931)
- La signora dell'isola; racconti (1931)
- Maestri del diluvio; viaggio nella Russia sovietica (1935)
- L'uomo è forte (Man Is Strong, 1938. Won the literature prize of the Accademia d'Italia in 1940)
- Incontri d'amore (1940)
- Viaggio in Russia (1943)
- L'età breve (1946; first novel in the series Memorie del mondo sommerso)
- Lunga notte di Medea, tragedia in due tempi (1949)
- Quasi una vita. Giornale di uno scrittore (1950. Winner of Strega Prize 1951)
- Il nostro tempo e la speranza. Saggi di vita contemporanea (1952)
- Un fatto di cronaca. Settantacinque racconti (1955)
- Colore di Berlino. Viaggio in Germania (2001)

== Selected filmography ==
- Adam's Tree (1936)
- A Woman Between Two Worlds (1936)
- No Man's Land (1939)
- Carmela (1942)
- Headlights in the Fog (1942)
- Fever (1943)
- Resurrection (1944)
- Pact with the Devil (1950)
- Women Without Names (1950)
