= Montalto (Aspromonte) =

Mountain in Italy

- Location within Italy

Highest point
- Elevation: 1,955 m (6,414 ft)
- Prominence: 1,709 m (5,607 ft)
- Listing: Ultra
- Coordinates: 38°09′32″N 15°55′16″E

Geography
- Location: Calabria, Italy
- Parent range: Aspromonte

Montalto is the highest peak of the Aspromonte, a massif in southern Calabria in Southern Italy. Located near Gambarie in the province of Reggio Calabria, it has an elevation of 1,955 metres (6,414 ft) above sea level. It is part of the Aspromonte National Park.

The Territorial Abbey and Sanctuary of Santa Maria di Polsi, a Christian sanctuary in the heart of the Aspromonte mountains, is situated at the bottom of a gorge at an altitude of 865 metres surrounded by high mountains on the east side of the Montalto. The sanctuary is difficult to reach and until some years ago could only be reached by foot.

== See also ==
- List of European ultra prominent peaks
