= Aspromonte National Park =

National park in Italy

Coordinates: 38.17°N 15.99°E

Parco Nazionale dell'Aspromonte
- IUCN category II (national park)
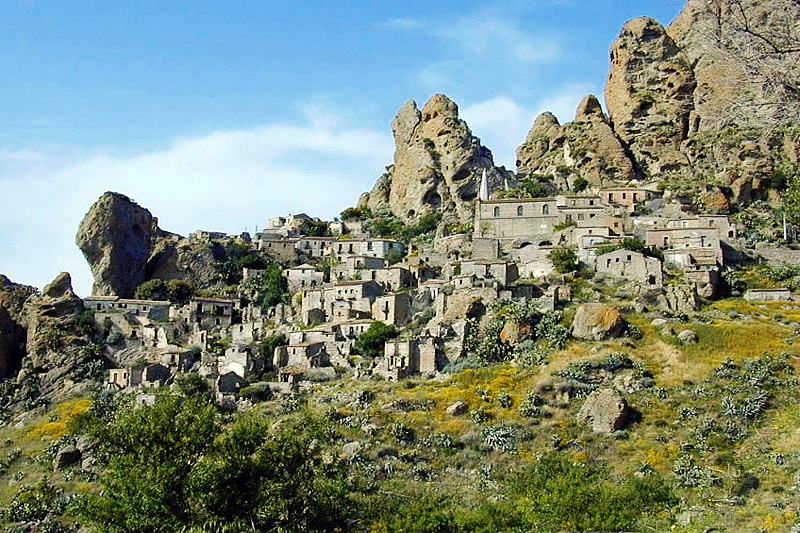
- Pentedattilo, a village of Aspromonte

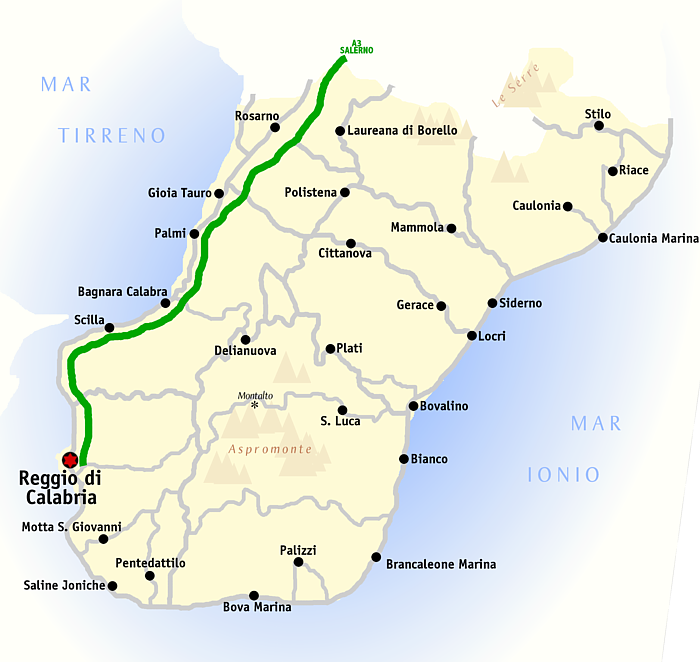
- Location of Aspromonte in Reggio Calabria
- Location: Calabria
- Nearest city: Reggio di Calabria
- Area: 641.53 km^{2} (247.70 sq mi)
- Established: 1989
- Governing body: Ministero dell'Ambiente
- Website: www.parks.it/parco.nazionale.aspromonte/Eindex.html

Aspromonte National Park is situated in the southern section of the Apennines, in Calabria, Italy.

The park lies near the sea and includes mountain summits with altitudes close to 2000 meters (Montalto is 1,955 m).

The park's territory, crossed by several watercourses, is populated by important species such as Italian wolf, peregrine falcon, Eurasian eagle-owl and northern goshawk. Most of the territory is dominated by forests of beech, silver fir, black pine, holm oak, sweet chestnut and Mediterranean maquis shrubland. A couple of rare species live here: Bonelli's eagle and a tropical fern, Woodwardia radicans.

Surrounded by the Mediterranean, the park is also rich in historical, artistic and archaeological value.

The park obtained recognition of UNESCO Global Geopark on April 21, 2021.

== History ==
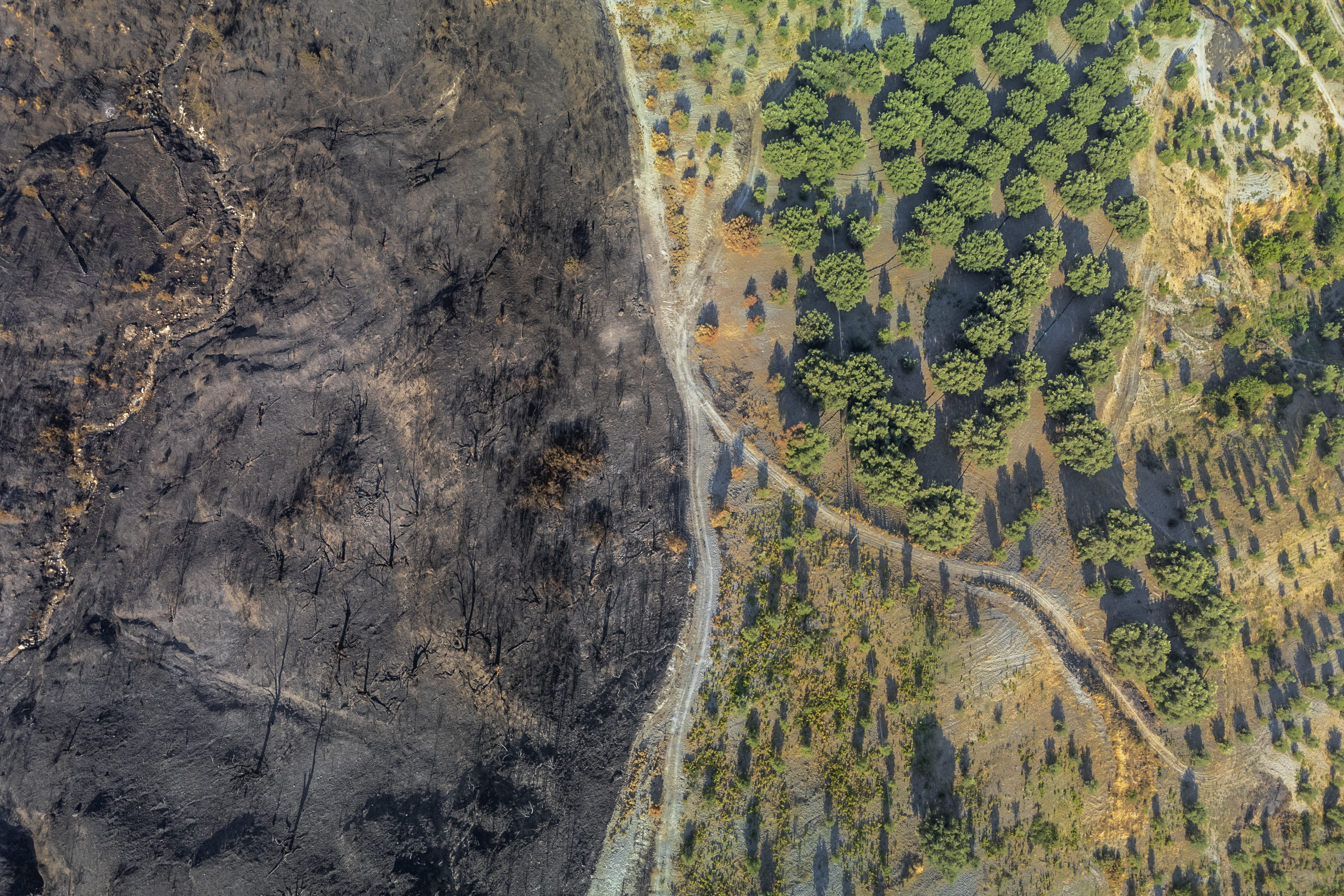
An aerial view of the edge of a burned portion of the park in 2021.

The park was heavily damaged by wildfires in 2021, with suspected involvement from the Italian Mafia.
