= Luigi Ursino =

Italian criminal (born 1933)

- Born: Luigi Ursino; February 16, 1933; Gioiosa Ionica, Italy
- Occupation: Criminal
- Known for: Member of the 'Ndrangheta

Luigi Ursino (born February 16, 1933) is an Italian criminal and a member of the 'Ndrangheta, a mafia-type organisation in Calabria, a region in southern Italy. He is the boss of the Ursino 'ndrina from Gioiosa Ionica, The family name is sometimes spelled Ursini.

The Ursino clan is also based in Turin in Piedmont, in northern Italy, and is involved in international drug trafficking.

Luigi Ursino became a member of Camera di Controllo, a provincial commission of the 'Ndrangheta, formed at the end of the Second 'Ndrangheta war in September 1991 to avoid further internal conflicts.
