= Nicola Gratteri =

Italian prosecutor (born 1958)

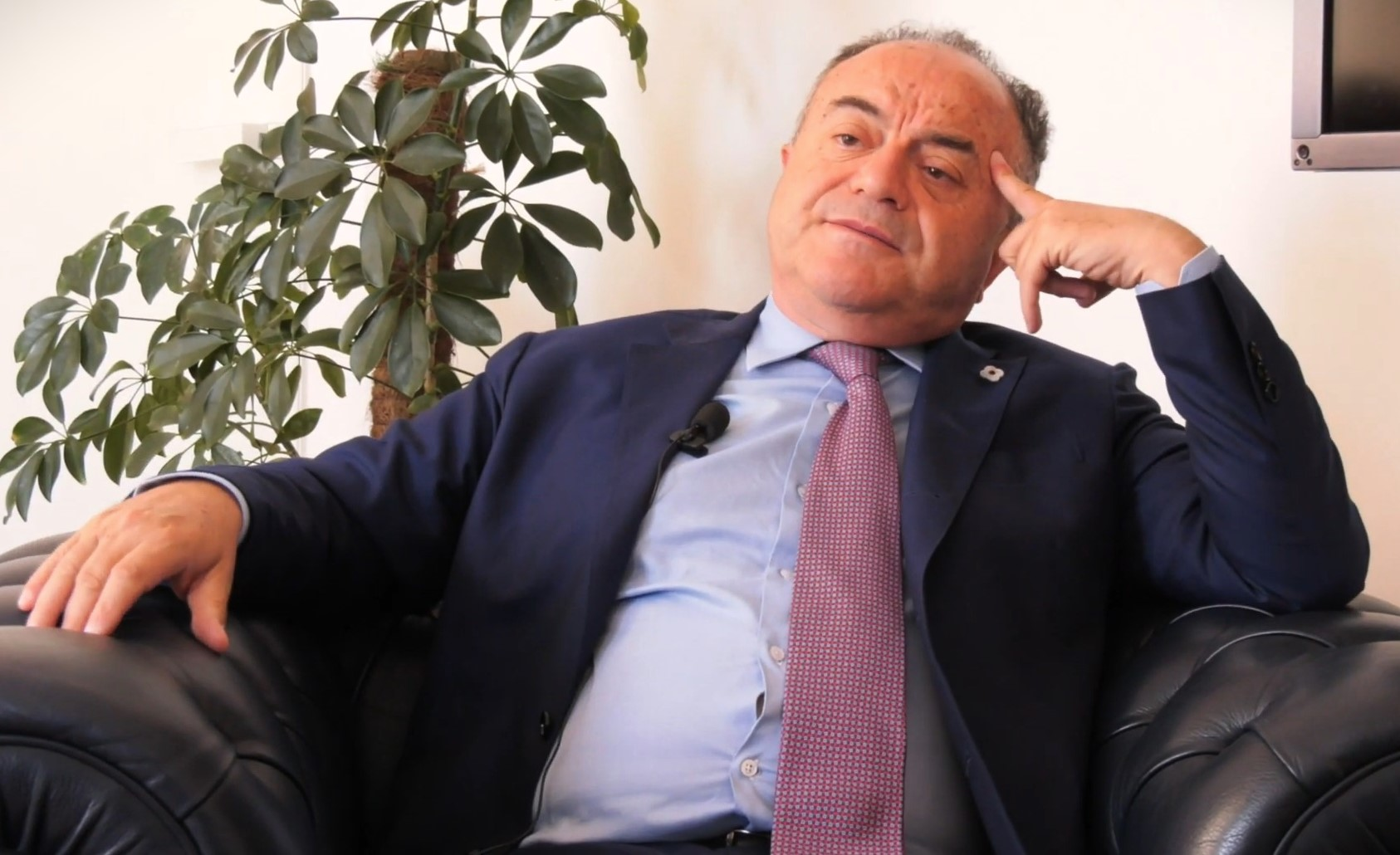
Gratteri in 2022

Nicola Gratteri (born 1958) is an Italian prosecutor. He grew up in southern Italy and after he witnessed the brutal methods of the 'Ndrangheta mafia group, he resolved to work against them. After studying for a law degree, he became a prosecutor working to bring mafia members to justice. Gratteri has survived a number of assassination attempts related to his work and is now protected by an armed guard. In 2014, prime minister Matteo Renzi unsuccessfully proposed him as Minister of Justice. Gratteri was prosecutor of Catanzaro from 2016 and of Naples from 2023.

== Early life and career ==
Gratteri was born in Gerace, Calabria, in 1958. He was the third of five children of a poor family. The 'Ndrangheta mafia group, who control up to 80% of the supply of cocaine in Europe, had a strong presence in the town and he recalls seeing bodies of their victims on his walk to school. The father of one of his school friends was murdered by the 'Ndrangheta and his friend was later killed after trying to get revenge. This incident inspired Gratteri to work against the mafia. He entered the University of Catania and received a law degree in 1984.

== Prosecutor ==
Gratteri joined the judiciary in 1986, at an unusually young age. One of his first prosecutions was that of a former friend who had joined the 'Ndrangheta; he received an eight-year prison sentence. Because of his work against the mafia, he received death threats. His fiancée's house was shot at in 1989 and she received death threats against him; from April that year he has been provided with an armed guard. In 1993, Gratteri survived three assassination attempts in a three week period; another plot against him was foiled in 2005. Because of the security risk, Gratteri has not been to a cinema or a restaurant since the late 1990s.

In August 2007, Gratteri was consulted by German police following the murder of six Italians in Duisburg that was believed to be mafia-related. In 2014 Italian prime minister Matteo Renzi appointed Gratteri to head a commission to draft new anti-mafia laws. Renzi also attempted to appoint him as Minister of Justice; this was unsuccessful due to opposition from president Giorgio Napolitano. Napolitano's position was that while prosecutors had previously been appointed as ministers, this had only happened after they had retired from their judicial role.

In 2013 Prime Minister Enrico Letta set him the task of creating a task force to fight organised crime.

In 2016, Gratteri was appointed prosecutor of Catanzaro, Calabria. In this role, he carried out a blitz on the 'Ndrangheta and its political connections. This involved 2,500 police officers interviewing 913 witnesses and generated 479 suspects. The operation resulted in 438 charges being brought against 335 persons. The cases have involved 600 lawyers.

In 2023, Gratteri was nominated prosecutor of Naples, the largest prosecutor's office in Italy.

== Personal life ==
For security reasons, Gratteri lives separately from his wife and they meet only at safehouses. They have two adult sons who live in northern Italy; Gratteri meets them for around 30 minutes every two months. He is a keen gardener who grows his own vegetables and makes jam and olive oil.
