= Aspromonte =

Mountain in Italy

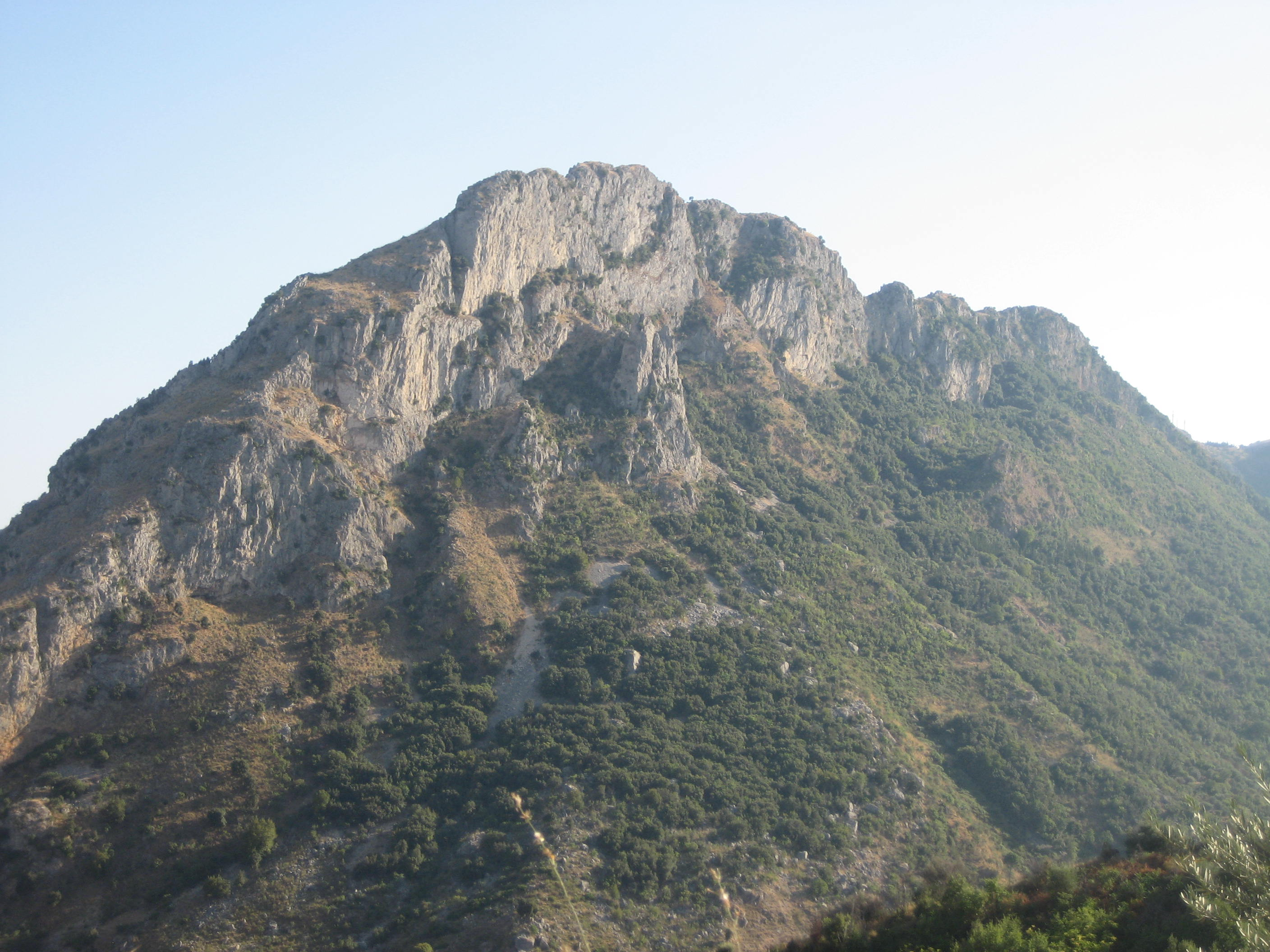
- Mount Consolino in the Aspromonte

Highest point
- Peak: Montalto
- Elevation: 1,956 m (6,417 ft)
- Coordinates: 38°10′N 15°53′E

Geography
- Location within Italy
- Country: Italy
- Region: Calabria
- Parent range: Apennines

Geology
- Orogeny: Alpine orogeny
- Rock type(s): Granite, metamorphic rock

The Aspromonte is a mountain massif in the Metropolitan City of Reggio Calabria (Calabria, southern Italy). In Italian aspro means "rough", whereas in Greek it means "white" (Άσπρος), therefore the name literally translates to either "rough mountain" or "white mountain". It overlooks the Strait of Messina, being bounded by the Ionian and Tyrrhenian Seas and by the Pietrace river. The highest peak is Montalto (1,955 m (6,414 ft)). The constituting rocks are mostly gneiss and mica schists, which form characteristic overlapping terraces. The massif is part of the Aspromonte National Park.

In the short coastal strip citrus fruits, vine and olives are grown, while at high elevations the vegetation is composed mostly by oak and holm oak under 1,000 m (3,300 ft), and by pine, Sicilian fir and beech over it. Olive trees grow in abundance. Also, the rare bergamot, the lemony-yellow fruit used in perfumes and flavouring for Earl Grey tea, only grows in the southern Aspromonte.

Points of interest include the Gambarie ski resort (1,311 m (4,301 ft)) and the Sanctuary of Our Lady of Polsi, in the comune of San Luca. Part of the population known as the Griko people has retained Greek culture and language (the so-called Griko language).

Charlemagne is said to have defeated the Saracen king Agolant on Aspromonte. A poem of 11,376 verses was written after this victory, titled Aspremont (chanson de geste).

Giuseppe Garibaldi, landing here with 3,000 volunteers in his march towards Rome, was defeated and captured on 29 August 1862, in the Battle of Aspromonte.

In 2021, Aspromonte was designated as a Global Geopark by UNESCO, the United Nations Educational, Scientific and Cultural Organization. In the same year, several people died as a result of various wildfires.

== Gallery ==
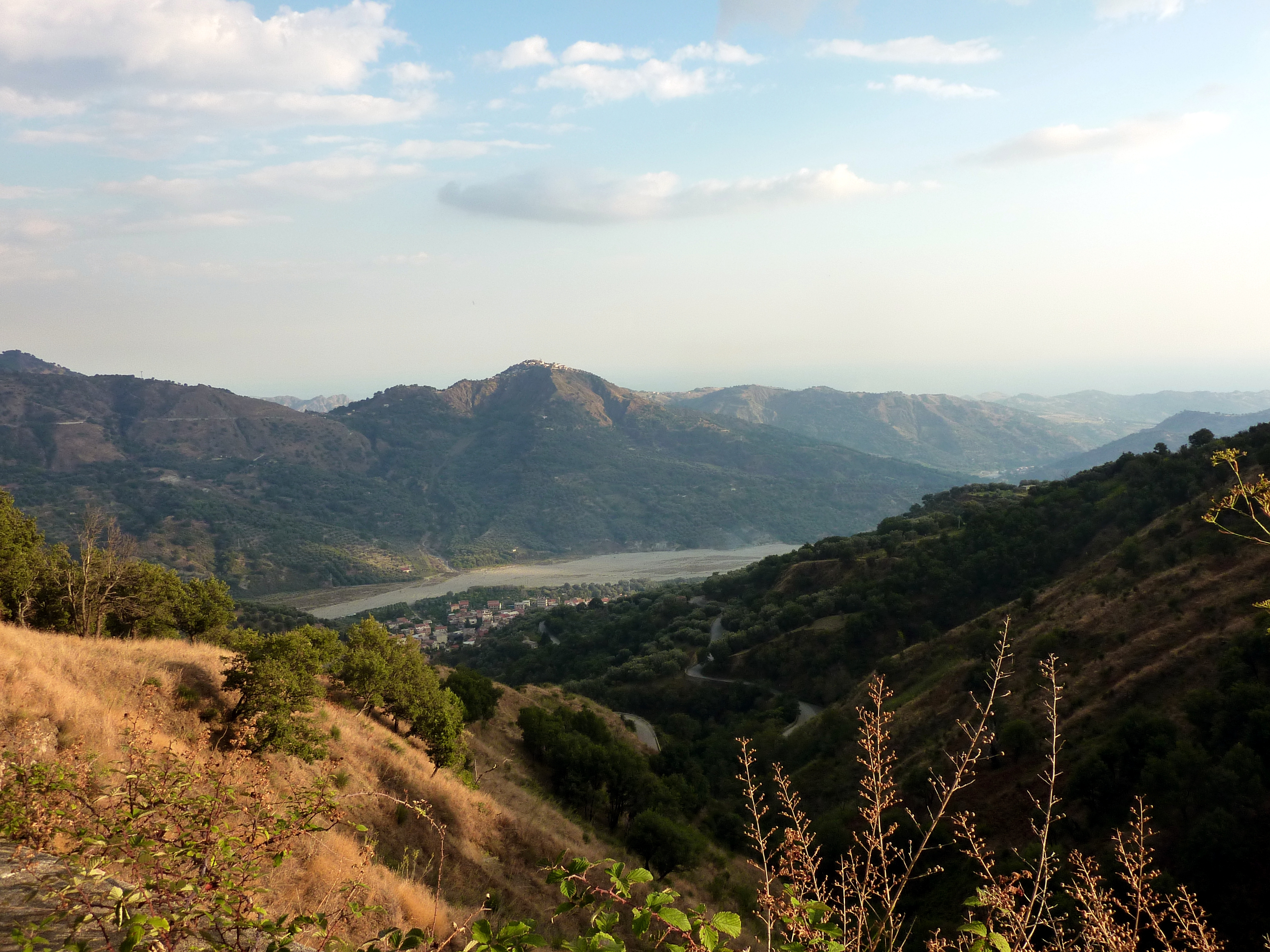
South Aspromonte near Bagaladi seen towards south, a dry river bed (fiumara).

== See also ==
- Griko people
- Magna Graecia
