= Territorial Abbey and Sanctuary of Santa Maria di Polsi =

Church building in San Luca, Italy

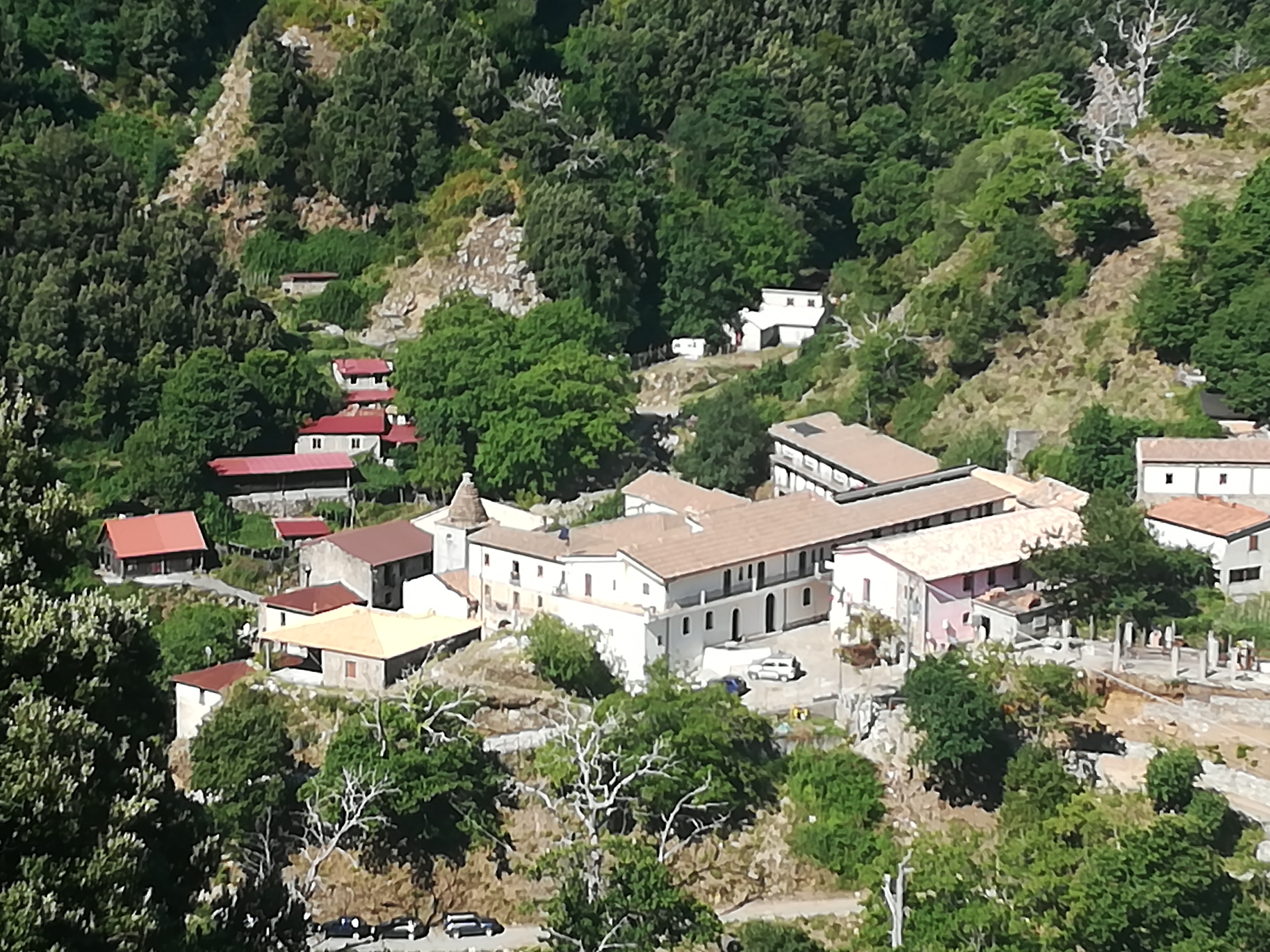

The Sanctuary of Our Lady of Polsi, also known as the Sanctuary of Santa Maria di Polsi or Our Lady of the Mountain, is a Christian sanctuary in the heart of the Aspromonte mountains, near San Luca in Calabria, southern Italy. It was founded by Roger II of Sicily in 1144. The church and monastery are situated in a spectacular setting at the bottom of a gorge at an altitude of 865 metres surrounded by high mountains on the east side of the Montalto (1,955 metres), the highest peak of the Aspromonte. The sanctuary is difficult to reach. Until some years ago Polsi could only be reached by foot.

== Convent and church ==
The sanctuary is a Basilian convent – one of the few which have survived in Calabria. The church has three naves; the central nave has the classic honeycomb ceiling decorated with solid gold leaf. The arches, resting on solid pillars, have been magnificently stuccoed by local craftsmen, while the scenes painted around the walls describe the life and miracles of the Virgin Mary.

The original statue of the Madonna was carved in tufa by a Sicilian artist in the 16th century and is coloured, with staring black and white eyes which follow the viewer. The second statue of the Madonna of the Mountains is kept in a niche in white marble. Every year, on September 2, her feast day, the statue is carried in procession by a great number of people. Every fifty years a very special event takes place at Polsi: the crowning of the statue of the Madonna on the main altar. The golden crowns were first placed on the heads of the Madonna and Child in 1860, when the father superior, Domenico Fera, to celebrate the three hundredth anniversary of the arrival of the statue in the Sanctuary in 1560.

== Cult and pilgrimage ==
The origins of the cult at Polsi go back to well before the Medieval era, archaeologists today believe. They have found pinakes or votive clay artefacts manufactured in pre-Roman times by settlers from the nearby Hellenic colony of Locri, that indicate the existence of a female fertility cult associated with Persephone. After Christianity was introduced to Italy, Basilian monks founded a hermitage in the 7th century celebrating Greek rites in honour of the Madonna until the Roman Catholic Church expelled them and imposed the Latin rite in the late 15th century.

The pilgrimage to Polsi has ancient origins and is still very important. Worshipers from all over Calabria and Eastern Sicily come to honour the Madonna, a token of faith to pay at least once in one’s lifetime. This holds not only for the believer. Some who come to Polsi feel as if they have set out beyond a “new frontier”. Worshipers come from June to November, but the numbers increase between 30 August and 2 September to over 50.000. It has been venerated by the people of Aspromonte and it has also been an important site to migrants from Calabria and Messina.

Many elements date back to pagan rites from the ancient Magna Græcia culture, the bases of which are still evident in the soul and language of Calabria – older people in the villages around the sanctuary still speak Griko. Until not very long ago, when the statue of Our Lady was taken out in procession, grain and flowers used to be thrown around it; this is considered one of the many pagan residues of the old cult of Demetra and Persephone, a symbol of the link between human fertility and that of the earth. The atmosphere is influenced by the primordial sacrifice of goats, whose meat is then cooked. The whole event is accompanied by wild performances of the tarantella, a local dance, which represent an ancient and universal way of honouring the divine being. Therefore, pilgrims go to Polsi to pray, thank, ask for graces to be granted, but also to feel free, live the illusion, be together, dance, sing and eat goat.

During these last years church authorities have required several substantial changes in the religious practices and traditional devotions, in an attempt to level and normalize all manifestations of popular belief.

== Cultural event ==
Beside a religious event, the festival in Polsi is an important cultural event for local music and dance. Before the road to Polsi was constructed, people would walk for hours or even days. During the pilgrimage people would dance along stretches of the road. Women in particular might make the vow to dance along the route if they wanted to ask for a favour or to give thanks. According to the Calabrian writer Corrado Alvaro in his book ‘Calabria’ in 1931: “Girls thus dance along the entire route, and will be dancing night and day for the hours that they have specified in their vow, until they will collapse on the ground or need to lean on a wall while their feet are still moving.”

The festival of Polsi had nothing of the sadness of others where the sick and deformed met in search of pity and help. It was more a great religious bacchanal, a Dionysian feast, to which people flocked as to a giant picnic in the mountains, ate, perhaps prayed a little and especially where one danced, according to Francesco Perri in his book ‘Enough of Dreams’ in 1929. “Caravans came down from every point in the valley. The people sang and uttered short, loud cries of ‘Viva Maria’ and continually fired their guns. Among the crowds around the sanctuary and in the nearby wood the shooting was incessant …. And over all that multiple discordant din that boomed like the surf of the sea rose a mingled music of pipes, harmonicas, violins, guitars and Basque tambourines.”

Those who attended the festival remained by the sanctuary for a few days. People had to camp in the valley. The contemporary festival is very different. The long walk has almost disappeared and nobody dances on the way. People now drive to the sanctuary, mainly by truck – and the journey is accompanied by the sound of religious chants played by portable amplifiers. Most people now prefer to go back home after they have reached the church and completed their thanksgiving prayers – most attend the festival only on the day of the procession.

== 'Ndrangheta sanctuary ==
The chiefs of the Calabrian criminal consortium, the 'Ndrangheta, have held annual meetings, called crimini, at the Sanctuary of Our Lady of Polsi. Already in 1903, the Carabinieri captain Giuseppe Petella reported meetings between several criminal societies at the shrine. According to the pentito Cesare Polifroni – a former member turned state witness – at these meetings, every boss “must give account of all the activities carried out during the year and of all the most important facts taking place in his territory such as kidnappings, homicides, etc.” The capo crimine, who is elected every year, is in charge of convening these meetings, but, far from being “the boss of the bosses”, actually has comparatively little authority to interfere in family feuds or to control the level of inter-family violence.

In 1969 the police raided a meeting, the so-called Montalto summit, near the Sanctuary and captured more than 70 'ndranghetisti, while others managed to escape. The importance of the meeting for the unity of the whole 'Ndrangheta was underestimated for a long time. Bosses from outside Calabria, from as far as Canada and Australia, regularly attend the fall meetings at the Sanctuary of Polsi, an indication that the 'ndrine around the world perceive themselves as being part of the same collective entity.

In 2007, fewer people attended the religious festival due to fears and tensions resulting from the San Luca feud between two rival 'Ndrangheta clans from San Luca.
