= Antonio Pelle =

Ndrangheta boss (1932–2009)

- Mugshot of 'Ndrangheta boss Antonio Pelle
- Born: March 1, 1932; San Luca, Italy
- Died: November 4, 2009 (aged 77); Locri, Italy
- Other names: Ntoni Gambazza , La Mamma
- Allegiance: Pelle 'ndrina / 'Ndrangheta

Antonio Pelle (Italian pronunciation: [anˈtɔːnjo ˈpɛlle]; March 1, 1932 – November 4, 2009), also known as Ntoni Gambazza ("Tony Bad Leg"), was a historically significant and charismatic 'Ndrangheta boss from San Luca in Calabria. He was the patriarch of the San Luca locale and the 'Ndrangheta capo crimine, the titular head of the organisation, although with little effective power. He reached the rank of vangelo, at the time the highest rank in the organisation.

== Criminal career ==
Ntoni Pelle was born as the fourth child in a very poor family in San Luca. As an illiterate shepherd he rambled the desolate Aspromonte mountains around San Luca, Platì and Careri. In 1957 he was charged with burglary, but released for insufficient proof. A year later he was shot in the leg and in 1959 he was again acquitted, this time for illegal possession of a firearm. In 1961, he was arrested for murder, attempted murder and criminal conspiracy. Released because of expiration of detention terms in 1970, the Court of Appeal sentenced him to 11 years, 11 months and 11 days a year later. Pelle became a fugitive until he was arrested in November 1977.

Pelle disappeared from the radar screen until 1989 when several indictments were issued against him. The indictments charged Pelle for kidnapping, money laundering and mafia conspiracy together with 49 others such as the high ranking 'Ndrangheta bosses Sebastiano Romeo from San Luca, Giuseppe Morabito from Africo, Pasquale Barbaro and others. Several clans formed a single entity, known as the Anonima sequestri dell’Aspromonte, that had been responsible for a string of kidnappings in the 1980s. In the course of the investigations, police authorities calculated that Pelle had acquired some 1.5 billion lire (some €750,000).

== Moving into drug trafficking ==
Pelle was charged again in 1992 and 1993 for drug trafficking. The investigations revealed how Pelle and Giuseppe Morabito provided 340 million lire (some €170,000) to Antonio Papalia to pay for drug consignments. The money from kidnappings was invested in drug trafficking by the 'Ndrangheta, which became the most important source for illegal revenue and replaced the kidnap business which attracted too much media and police attention. The 'Ndrangheta at the time made the decisive and conscious decision to reform from an archaic organisation to a modern one involved in the drug business.

According to several 'Ndrangheta turncoats (pentiti), Pelle was a member of Camera di Controllo, a provincial commission of the 'Ndrangheta, formed at the end of the Second 'Ndrangheta war in September 1991 to avoid further internal conflicts.

== San Luca feud ==
The Pelle-Vottari-Romeo, is one of the protagonists in the San Luca feud against the Strangio-Nirta clan. The vendetta between the two clans from San Luca reached the headlines of the world press when on August 15, 2007, six men belonging to the Pelle-Vottari-Romeo clan were shot dead in their cars in front of a pizzeria near the train station of Duisburg in western Germany. Notwithstanding his non-involvement in the facts, Antonio Pelle was indirectly involved through his son-in-law, Francesco Vottari, one the protagonists among the disputing clans, who is married to his daughter Maria Pelle.

Antonio Pelle tried in every way to end the feud and make peace. However, he was only able to secure that the section of the clan he headed (the "Vanchelli") was not involved in the feud that affected another element of the clan. In order to underline his non-involvement in the feud, he asked family members to send a letter to the Gazzetta del Sud newspaper. The message was clear: the feud was a clash between minor elements of the clan and Gambazza was trying to reach a peace without victors, as he had done in the past, in 1991, when the conflict started.

== Fugitive ==
During his criminal career he was acquitted in nine out of ten trials. In the early years his lawyer was Giovanni Leone before he became President of the Italian Republic in 1971. He had been a fugitive and included on the list of most wanted fugitives in Italy since 2000. He faced a 26-year sentence for cocaine trafficking and mafia association. While in hiding, he allegedly found refuge somewhere in the desolate Aspromonte mountains.

In his ten years on the run Pelle never made use of telephones, cell phones, credit cards, ATMs, computers; nothing that could in any way "trace" his presence to specific locations. His son Salvatore Pelle wanted since 1991, was arrested on March 10, 2007. During an operation in San Luca on March 4, 2008, the police discovered an underground bunker in one of the seized buildings which investigators believed was used as a hideout by Pelle.

== Arrest and death ==
Antonio Pelle was arrested on June 12, 2009, in a hospital in Polistena (Calabria), recovering from a hernia surgery. "It's all over, it's all over," he said to the police, who found him when they followed his wife Giuseppa Giampaolo visiting the hospital. He died from a heart attack in a hospital in Locri on November 4, 2009, a day after he had been released for his bad health condition.

According to investigators, his nephew Sebastiano Pelle returned to San Luca to take over when his uncle died. However, it is generally acknowledged that his second-born son Giuseppe Pelle is the successor at the head of the clan. One of the four sons of Antonio Pelle, Giuseppe married a daughter of the ‘Ndrangheta boss Francesco Barbaro from Platì, securing a tight alliance between these two powerful 'ndrine.
