= Capocrimine =

Boss of the annual 'Ndrangheta meeting

A capocrimine is the elected boss of the crimine, an annual meeting of the 'Ndrangheta locali near the Sanctuary of Our Lady of Polsi in the municipality of San Luca during the September Feast. Far from being the "boss of bosses", the capo crimine actually has comparatively little authority to interfere in family feuds or to control the level of interfamily violence.

== History ==
At least since the 1950s, these annual meetings have traditionally served as a forum to discuss future strategies and settle disputes among the locali. The assembly exercises weak supervisory powers over the activities of all 'Ndrangheta groups. Strong emphasis was placed on the temporary character of the position of the crimine boss. A new representative was elected at each meeting.

From the beginning of the 1960s until the outbreak of the First 'Ndrangheta war in 1975, the position of capo crimine was held by Antonio Macrì from Siderno. Since the mid-1970s, according to several pentiti, members of the Nirta family from San Luca and the Piromalli family from Gioia Tauro rotated among themselves the position of capo crimine.

In July 2010, Italian police arrested the actual capo crimine: Domenico Oppedisano, an 80-year-old Ndrangheta boss from Rosarno. Investigations showed that he had been appointed at the marriage of two children of bosses in August 2009 attended by 2,000 people. The marriage was between Elisa Pelle – the daughter of Giuseppe Pelle and granddaughter of Antonio Pelle "Gambazza", the former capo crimine from San Luca who died in November 2009 of natural causes – and Giuseppe Barbaro, the son of Pasquale Barbaro and the scion of the eponymous Barbaro 'ndrina from Platì.

The election of Oppedisano had not been easy. According to police investigations the power behind Oppedisano was Vincenzo Pesce, the head of the Pesce 'ndrina in Rosarno. On the other hand, Giuseppe Pelle aspired to replace his ailing father Antonio Gambazza Pelle as capo crimine and keep the title in San Luca at the risk of triggering a conflict between clans. However, Vincenzo Pesce felt that the nomination of Pelle would distort the equilibrium in the 'Ndrangheta and threatened to form a separate organization taking some 30 locali – local 'Ndrangheta organisations – with him. As a result, Oppedisano became the capo crimine instead of Pelle.

Oppedisano assumed power at a banquet held at the Sanctuary of Our Lady of Polsi in September that year. In one wiretapped conversation he talked of 1,000 affiliates attending the meeting. In the course of the investigation, dubbed "Il crimine", the capo crimine also appeared to be the nominal head of the 'Ndrangheta Commission, known as La Provincia.
