= San Luca =

San Luca Ághios Lukás (Greek)
- Comune
- Comune di San Luca
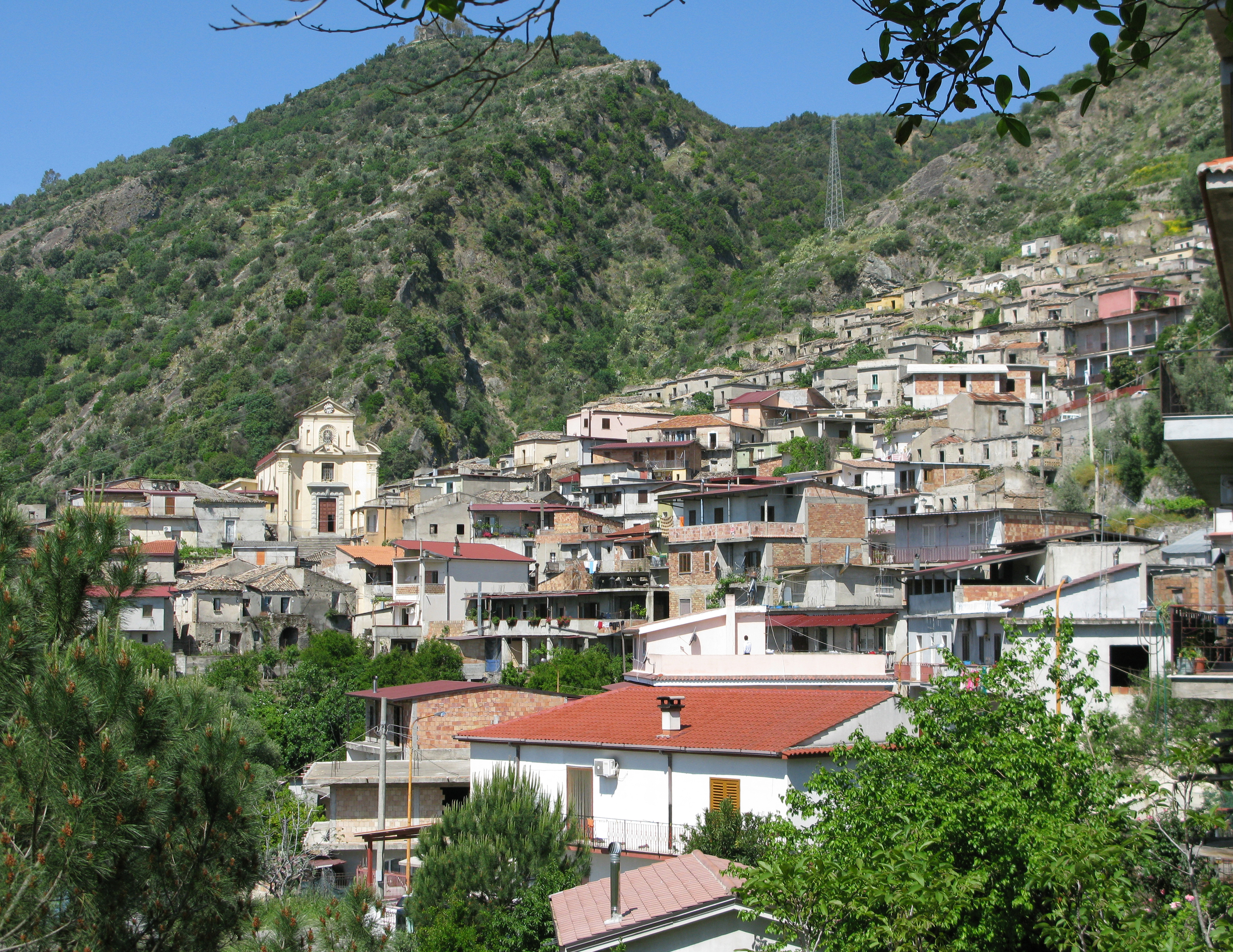
- View of San Luca

- Coat of arms

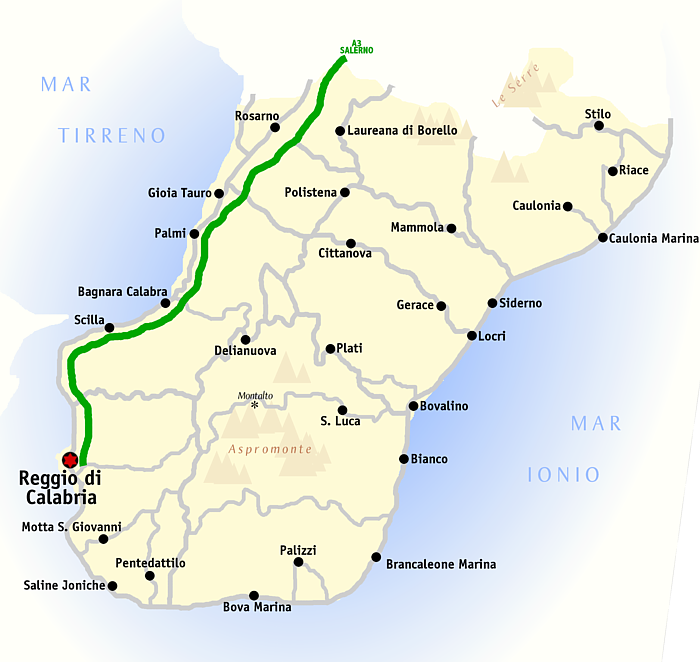
- Map of the province of Reggio Calabria

- Location within Italy Location within Calabria
- Coordinates: 38°9′N 16°4′E
- Country: Italy
- Region: Calabria
- Metropolitan city: Reggio Calabria (RC)
- Frazioni: Ientile, Polsi, Ricciolio, Stranges, Vorea

Government
  - Mayor: Bruno Bartolo

Area
  - Total: 104.2 km^{2} (40.2 sq mi)
- Elevation: 250 m (820 ft)

Population (Dec. 2007)
  - Total: 4,126
  - Density: 39.60/km^{2} (102.6/sq mi)
- Demonym: Sanluchesi
- Time zone: UTC+1 (CET)
  - Summer (DST): UTC+2 (CEST)
- Postal code: 89030
- Dialing code: 0964
- Patron saint: St. Luke the Evangelist
- Saint day: October 18

San Luca is a comune (municipality) in the Province of Reggio Calabria in Italy, located about 100 kilometres (62 mi) southwest of Catanzaro and about 35 kilometres (22 mi) east of Reggio Calabria. The town is situated on the eastern slopes of the Aspromonte mountains and in the valley of the Bonamico river. The village has long been known as a stronghold of the 'Ndrangheta, a Mafia-type criminal organisation based in Calabria, with an ongoing clan based power struggle dubbed the San Luca feud.

The Sanctuary of Our Lady of Polsi is located 10 kilometres (6 mi) from San Luca. It has long been the 'Ndrangheta's meeting place.

== History ==
Between the 9th and 11th centuries, the valley became a refuge for Byzantine monks escaping Arab-occupied Sicily, who founded both cenobitic and monastic communities in the area. In the region of Potamia – a former town near the current San Luca – seven monasteries of the Order of St. Basil of Caesarea were established. Today, only ruins or place names bear witness to most of them. Only the Monastery of Polsi – hidden deep within the heart of Aspromonte – has endured historical upheaval and devastating natural disasters, and remains one of Calabria's most significant places of worship.

San Luca was founded on October 18, 1592, by Prince Sigismund Loffredo and named after Saint Luke the Evangelist, who became the patron saint of the town. It was populated by refugees from the old town of Potamia, which was destroyed by landslides. San Luca became a comune in 1811, and was hit by floods and landslides in 1951, 1953, and December 1972. During the night of 3-4 January 1973, a landslide blocked the Bonamico river and formed a lake, subsequently named the Lago Costantino in the municipal territory of San Luca.

Journalist and author Corrado Alvaro grew up in San Luca in the early 1900s, a time when illiteracy was near 100 percent and the town had no drinking water. The women went to fetch water with the casks on their heads at a well nearby. The town was fairly isolated; there was no road to the coast and the only way was on foot. Many inhabitants joined the Italian diaspora to escape the extreme poverty.

== Stronghold of the 'Ndrangheta ==
San Luca is considered to be the stronghold of the 'Ndrangheta, a Mafia-type criminal organisation based in Calabria. According to a former 'ndranghetista, "almost all the male inhabitants belong to the 'Ndrangheta, and the Sanctuary of Our Lady of Polsi has long been the meeting place of the affiliates, known as the Crimine." At least since the 1950s, the chiefs of the 'Ndrangheta locali have met regularly near the Sanctuary of Our Lady of Polsi during the September Feast. In 1969 the police raided a meeting near the sanctuary and captured more than 70 'ndranghetisti, while others managed to escape.

The historical preeminence of the San Luca family is such that every new group or locale must obtain its authorization to operate and every group belonging to the 'Ndrangheta "has to deposit a small percentage of illicit proceeds to the principale of San Luca in recognition of the latter’s primordial supremacy." San Luca, in the words of a study published in 2005 by Italy's domestic intelligence service, is "the cradle of [the 'Ndrangheta] and its epicentre".

In 1991, the San Luca feud, a war between the Pelle-Vottari-Romeo and Strangio-Nirta clans began and resulted in several deaths. It carried into Germany in August 2007 when six Italian men were shot to death in front of an Italian restaurant in Duisburg.

In May 2023, the Italian police made numerous arrests in San Luca as part of an international razzia against the 'Ndrangheta.

The Italian government dissolved the municipality of San Luca due to infiltration by the 'Ndrangheta on 14 September 2000, and 17 May 2013. On 11 June 2024, a prefectural commissioner was appointed due to the failure to submit electoral lists, while on 10 April 2025, the municipality was again placed under commission due to mafia infiltration.

== Demographic evolution ==
Historical population

Year	Pop.	±%
1861	1,536	—
1871	1,628	+6.0%
1881	1,767	+8.5%
1901	2,029	+14.8%
1911	2,169	+6.9%
1921	2,288	+5.5%

Year	Pop.	±%
1931	2,657	+16.1%
1936	2,916	+9.7%
1951	2,728	−6.4%
1961	4,072	+49.3%
1971	4,300	+5.6%
1981	4,400	+2.3%

Year	Pop.	±%
1991	4,413	+0.3%
2001	4,106	−7.0%
2011	4,044	−1.5%
2021	3,482	−13.9%

Source: Data from ISTAT

== Notable people ==
- Corrado Alvaro (1895–1956), journalist and writer, born in San Luca in 1895. His hand-written notes and other personal belongings are now kept in the house where he was born by the Corrado Alvaro Foundation.
- Antonio Pelle (1932–2009), also known as Ntoni Gambazza, a historically significant 'Ndrangheta boss
- Antonio Nirta (1919–2015), a historically significant 'Ndrangheta boss
