= Locale ('Ndrangheta) =

A locale, translated as "local" or "place", is the main local organizational unit of the 'Ndrangheta with jurisdiction over criminal activities in an entire town or an area in a large urban center.

A locale is usually made up by one 'ndrina, in the case of a small town, or several 'ndrine, if more than one 'ndrina operates in the same town. In the case of larger cities a local may rule over a certain area or neighbourhood of the city. In some contexts a 'ndrina is more powerful than the locale on which they formally depend.

Each locale has a boss with authority over members' life and death, a capo locale, usually the capobastone of a 'ndrina. It has at least 49 members. Besides the capo locale, there is the contabile (accountant) who handles the finances - commonly called la bacinella or la valigetta (briefcase). A crimine oversees the illegal activity. All three form a triumvirate called the Copiata. A locale is often subdivided into two divisions: the società minore (the "minor" or lower society) and the società maggiore ("major" or higher society). The minor is submissive to the major.

The locale of San Luca has a historical preeminence. Every new group or locale must obtain its authorization to operate. Every group belonging to the 'Ndrangheta "still has to deposit a small percentage of illicit proceeds to the principale of San Luca in recognition of the latter's primordial supremacy."
