= Bellocco =

Bellocco is an Italian surname. Notable people with the surname include:

- Giuseppe Bellocco (born 1948), Italian gangster of the Bellocco 'ndrina
- Gregorio Bellocco (born 1956), Italian gangster of the Bellocco 'ndrina
- Umberto Bellocco (1937–2022), Italian gangster of the Bellocco 'ndrina
