= List of most wanted fugitives in Italy =

The list of most wanted fugitives in Italy is a most wanted list published by the Italian Interior Ministry. It includes criminals who are considered extremely dangerous by the Polizia di Stato. The list was started in July 1992. There are also lists of 100 and 500 most wanted fugitives of lesser importance. When a fugitive is caught, they are promptly removed from the list and replaced by another individual.

== The list ==
=== Anonima sarda ===
- Attilio Cubeddu, wanted since 1997

=== Camorra ===
- Renato Cinquegranella, wanted since 2002

=== Cosa Nostra ===
- Giovanni Motisi, wanted since 1998

== Removed from the list ==
=== 1992 ===
- Giuseppe "Piddu" Madonia (Cosa Nostra), arrested on 6 September 1992.
- Raffaele Stolder (Camorra), wanted since 1989, arrested on 10 September 1992.
- Carmine Alfieri (Camorra), arrested on 11 September 1992.
- Domenico Libri ('Ndrangheta), arrested on 17 September 1992.
- Matteo Nicolò Boe (Sardinian banditry) arrested on 13 October 1992.

=== 1993 ===
- Salvatore Riina (Cosa Nostra), wanted since 1969, arrested on 15 January 1993, in Palermo (Sicily).
- Rosetta Cutolo (Camorra), sister of Raffaele Cutolo, arrested on 8 February 1993.
- Umberto Bellocco ('Ndrangheta), wanted since 1988, arrested on 18 February 1993.
- Mario Umberto Imparato (Camorra), killed by the police on 15 March 1993.
- Pasquale Condello ('Ndrangheta), arrested on 23 March 1993.
- Antonio Imerti ('Ndrangheta), arrested on 23 March 1993.
- Umberto Ammaturo (Camorra), wanted since 1990, arrested on 3 May 1993, in Lima (Peru).
- Nitto Santapaola (Cosa Nostra), wanted since 1982, arrested on 18 May 1993, in Catania (Sicily).
- Giuseppe Pulvirenti (Cosa Nostra), wanted since 1982, arrested on 2 June 1993.
- Vincenzo Milazzo (Cosa Nostra), body found on 14 December 1993, killed by the Mafia.

=== 1994 ===
- Giuseppe Graviano (Cosa Nostra), arrested 27 January 1994.
- Santo Araniti ('Ndrangheta), wanted since 1983, arrested on 24 May 1994.
- Lorenzo Tinnirello (Cosa Nostra), wanted since 1989, arrested on 27 August 1994.
- Michelangelo La Barbera (Cosa Nostra), arrested on 3 December 1994.

=== 1995 ===
- Eugenio Galea (Cosa Nostra), arrested on 13 January 1995.
- Leoluca Bagarella (Cosa Nostra), wanted since 1991, arrested on 24 June 1995.
- Antonio Strangio ('Ndrangheta), arrested on 26 August 1995.
- Salvatore Cristaldi (Cosa Nostra), wanted since 1993, arrested on 7 October 1995.

=== 1996 ===
- Salvatore Cucuzza (Cosa Nostra), arrested on 5 May 1996.
- Giovanni Brusca (Cosa Nostra), wanted since 1991, arrested on 20 May 1996.
- Giorgio De Stefano ('Ndrangheta), arrested on 1 July 1996.
- Nicola Arena ('Ndrangheta), wanted since 1993, arrested on 6 July 1996.
- Carlo Greco (Cosa Nostra), wanted since 1989, arrested on 26 July 1996.
- Marzio Sepe (Camorra), wanted since 1992, arrested on 6 September 1996.

=== 1997 ===
- Mariano Asaro (Cosa Nostra), wanted since 1991, arrested on 18 April 1997.
- Michele Mercadante (Cosa Nostra), arrested on 18 April 1997.
- Giuseppe Polverino (Camorra), wanted since 1992, arrested on 21 May 1997.
- Pietro Aglieri (Cosa Nostra), wanted since 1989, arrested on 6 June 1997.
- Giuseppe La Mattina (Cosa Nostra), arrested on 6 June 1997.
- Girolamo Molè ('Ndrangheta), wanted since 1993, arrested on 12 July 1997.
- Mario Fabbrocino (Camorra), wanted since 1988, arrested on 3 September 1997, in Buenos Aires (Argentina).
- Natale Rosmini ('Ndrangheta), wanted since 1990, arrested on 13 December 1997.

=== 1998 ===
- Vito Vitale (Cosa Nostra), wanted since 1995, arrested on 14 April 1998.
- Pino Guastella (Cosa Nostra), arrested on 24 May 1998.
- Francesco Schiavone "Sandokan" (Camorra), wanted since 1993, arrested on 11 July 1998.
- Mariano Tullio Troia (Cosa Nostra), wanted since 1992, arrested on 15 September 1998.
- Diego Burzotta (Cosa Nostra), wanted since 1994, arrested on 14 October 1998.
- Francesco Messina Denaro (Cosa Nostra), wanted since 1990, died of natural causes in 2023.
- Pino Cammarata (Cosa Nostra), wanted since 1991, arrested on 4 December 1998.

=== 1999 ===
- Salvatore Di Ganci (Cosa Nostra), wanted since 1993, arrested on 29 January 1999.
- Giuseppe Piromalli ('Ndrangheta), wanted since 1993, arrested on 11 March 1999.
- Bachisio Franco Goddi (Sardinian banditry), arrested on 13 July 1999.

=== 2000 ===
- Francesco Mallardo (Camorra), arrested on 14 April 2000.
- Gennaro Sacco (Camorra), wanted since 1999, arrested on 19 April 2000.
- Antonio Libri ('Ndrangheta), wanted since 1994, arrested on 23 May 2000.
- Ferdinando Cesarano (Camorra), wanted since 1998, arrested on 10 June 2000.
- Salvatore Genovese (Cosa Nostra), wanted since 1993, arrested on 12 October 2000.
- Francesco Prudentino (Sacra Corona Unita), wanted since 1995, arrested on 22 December 2000.
- Erminia Giuliano (Camorra), sister of Luigi Giuliano wanted since 2000, arrested on 24 December 2000.

=== 2001 ===
- Benedetto Spera (Cosa Nostra), wanted since 1971, arrested on 30 January 2001.
- Vincenzo Virga (Cosa Nostra), wanted since 1994, arrested on 21 February 2001.
- Angelo Nuvoletta (Camorra), wanted since 1995, arrested on 17 May 2001.
- Gaetano Santaiti ('Ndrangheta), wanted since 1993, arrested on 20 May 2001.
- Vito Di Emidio (Sacra Corona Unita), wanted since 1995, arrested on 29 May 2001.
- Maria Licciardi (Camorra), wanted since 1999, arrested on 14 June 2001.
- Carmine De Stefano ('Ndrangheta), wanted since 1994, arrested on 9 December 2001.
- Giuseppe Barbaro ('Ndrangheta), arrested on 10 December 2001.

=== 2002 ===
- Antonino Giuffrè (Cosa Nostra), wanted since 1993, arrested on 16 April 2002.
- Giuseppe Balsano (Cosa Nostra), wanted since 1993, arrested on 21 May 2002.
- Luigi Facchineri ('Ndrangheta), wanted since 1987, arrested on 31 August 2002, in Cannes (France).

=== 2003 ===
- Andrea Manciaracina (Cosa Nostra), wanted since 1992, arrested on 31 January 2003.
- Salvatore Rinella (Cosa Nostra), wanted since 1995, arrested on March 6, 2003.
- Filippo Cerfeda (Sacra Corona Unita), wanted since 2001, arrested on 12 March 2003, in Ridderkerk (Netherlands).
- Francesco Mallardo (Camorra), re-arrested on 28 August 2003.
- Giovanni Bonomo (Cosa Nostra), wanted since 1996, arrested on 14 November 2003.

=== 2004 ===
- Giuseppe Morabito ('Ndrangheta), wanted since 1992, arrested on 18 February 2004.
- Orazio De Stefano ('Ndrangheta), wanted since 1988, arrested on 22 February 2004.
- Francesco Schiavone "Cicciariello" (Camorra), wanted since 2002, arrested on 13 March 2004, in Poland.
- Roberto Pannunzi ('Ndrangheta), wanted since 1999, arrested on 5 April 2004, in Madrid (Spain) with his son Alessandro Pannunzi.
- Vito Roberto Palazzolo (Cosa Nostra), wanted since 1986, removed from the list on 23 April 2004, when his arrest warrant was revoked. On July 5, 2006, he was convicted and sentenced to 9 years in prison for Mafia association, but he has not been re-instated on the list of most wanted fugitives. Palazzolo was arrested on 30 March 2012 in Bangkok (Thailand) and extradited to Italy on 19 December 2013.
- Vito Bigione (Cosa Nostra), wanted since 1995, arrested on 27 May 2004, in Caracas (Venezuela).
- Pasquale Tegano ('Ndrangheta), wanted since 1994, arrested on 6 August 2004.
- Andrea Ghira, wanted since 1975, found dead on 9 September 2004.

=== 2005 ===
- Raffaele Antonio Ligato (Camorra), wanted since 2003, arrested in Germany on 26 January 2005.
- Gregorio Bellocco ('Ndrangheta), wanted since 1997, arrested on 16 February 2005.
- Giuseppe Iamonte ('Ndrangheta), wanted since 1993, arrested on 14 May 2005.
- Antonio Commisso ('Ndrangheta), wanted since 2004, arrested on 28 June 2005, near Toronto (Canada).
- Vincenzo Iamonte ('Ndrangheta), wanted since 1993, arrested on 30 July 2005.
- Luigi Putrone (Cosa Nostra), wanted since 1998, arrested on 12 August 2005 in Ústí nad Labem (Czech Republic).
- Paolo Di Lauro (Camorra), wanted since 2002, arrested on 16 September 2005.
- Umberto Di Fazio (Cosa Nostra), wanted since 2000, arrested on 23 October 2005

=== 2006 ===
- Rose Ann Scrocco, an insurrectionary anarchist, arrested on 16 January 2006, in Amsterdam (Netherlands).
- Giuseppe D'Agostino ('Ndrangheta), wanted since 1996, arrested on 23 March 2006.
- Bernardo Provenzano (Cosa Nostra), wanted since 1963, arrested on 11 April 2006, in Corleone (Sicily).
- Maurizio Di Gati (Cosa Nostra), wanted since 1994, arrested on 25 November 2006.

=== 2007 ===
- Salvatore Pelle ('Ndrangheta), wanted since 1991, arrested on 10 March 2007
- Giuseppe Bellocco ('Ndrangheta), wanted since 1997, arrested on 16 July 2007.
- Andrea Adamo (Cosa Nostra), wanted since 2001, arrested on 5 November 2007.
- Salvatore Lo Piccolo (Cosa Nostra), wanted since 1998, arrested on 5 November 2007.
- Sandro Lo Piccolo (Cosa Nostra), wanted since 1998, arrested on 5 November 2007.
- Daniele Emmanuello (Cosa Nostra), wanted since 1996, killed by police on 3 December 2007.
- Edoardo Contini (Camorra), wanted since 2001, arrested on 14 December 2007.

=== 2008 ===
- Vincenzo Licciardi (Camorra), wanted since 2004, arrested on 7 February 2008.
- Pasquale Condello, ('Ndrangheta), wanted since 1990, arrested on 18 February 2008.
- Giuseppe Coluccio, ('Ndrangheta), wanted since 2005, arrested on 7 August 2008, in Toronto (Canada).
- Patrizio Bosti, (Camorra), wanted since 2005, arrested on 10 August 2008, in Girona (Spain).
- Giuseppe De Stefano, ('Ndrangheta), wanted since 2003, arrested on 10 December 2008.
- Pietro Criaco, ('Ndrangheta), wanted since 1997, arrested on 28 December 2008.

=== 2009 ===
- Giuseppe Setola (Camorra), wanted since 2008, arrested on 14 January 2009, in Mignano Monte Lungo (Campania).
- Giovanni Strangio ('Ndrangheta), wanted since 2007, arrested on 12 March 2009, in Amsterdam (Netherlands).
- Raffaele Diana (Camorra), wanted since 2004, arrested on 3 May 2009, in Casal di Principe (Campania).
- Salvatore Coluccio ('Ndrangheta), wanted since 2005, arrested on 10 May 2009, in Marina di Gioiosa Ionica (Calabria).
- Antonio Pelle Gambazza ('Ndrangheta), wanted since 2000, arrested on 12 June 2009, in Polistena (Calabria).
- Salvatore Miceli (Cosa Nostra), wanted since 2001, arrested on 20 June 2009, in Caracas (Venezuela).
- Paolo Rosario De Stefano ('Ndrangheta), wanted since 2005, arrested on 18 August 2009, in Taormina (Sicily).
- Carmelo Barbaro ('Ndrangheta), wanted since 2001, arrested on 12 September 2009, in Reggio Calabria (Calabria).
- Santo La Causa (Cosa Nostra), wanted since 2007, arrested on 8 October 2009.
- Michele Labate ('Ndrangheta), wanted since 2007, surrendered to the police on 22 October 2009, in Rome (Lazio).
- Salvatore Russo (Camorra), wanted since 1995, arrested on 31 October 2009.
- Pasquale Russo (Camorra), wanted since 1995, arrested on 1 November 2009, in Sperone (Campania).
- Luigi Esposito (Camorra), wanted since 2003, arrested on 7 November 2009, in Posillipo (Campania).
- Domenico Raccuglia (Cosa Nostra), wanted since 1996, arrested on 15 November 2009, in Calatafimi (Sicily).
- Gaetano Fidanzati (Cosa Nostra), wanted since 2008, arrested on 5 December 2009, in Milan (Lombardy).
- Giovanni Nicchi (Cosa Nostra), wanted since 2006, arrested on 5 December 2009, in Palermo (Sicily).
- Raffaele Arzu, wanted since 2002, arrested on 9 December 2009, in Sardinia.

=== 2010 ===
- Paolo Di Mauro (Camorra), wanted since 2003, arrested on 27 January 2010, in Barcelona (Spain).
- Nicola Panaro (Camorra), wanted since 2003, arrested on 14 April 2010, in Lusciano (Campania).
- Giovanni Tegano ('Ndrangheta), wanted since 1993, arrested on 26 April 2010, in Reggio Calabria (Calabria).
- Giuseppe Falsone (Cosa Nostra), wanted since 1999, arrested on 25 June 2010, in Marseille (France).
- Cesare Pagano (Camorra), wanted since 2009, arrested on 8 July 2010, in Licola (Campania).
- Franco Li Bergolis (Mafia garganica), wanted since 2009, arrested on 26 September 2010, in Monte Sant'Angelo (Apulia).
- Gerlandino Messina (Cosa Nostra), wanted since 1999, arrested on 23 October 2010, in Favara (Sicily).
- Antonio Iovine (Camorra), wanted since 1996, arrested on 17 November 2010, in Casal di Principe (Campania).

=== 2011 ===
- Mario Caterino (Camorra), wanted since 2005, arrested on 2 May 2011, in Casal di Principe (Campania).
- Giuseppe Pacilli (Mafia garganica), wanted since 2009, arrested on 13 May 2011, in Monte Sant'Angelo (Apulia).
- Giuseppe Dell'Aquila (Camorra), wanted since 2002, arrested on 25 May 2011, in Varcaturo Licola (Campania).
- Giovanni Arena (Cosa Nostra), wanted since 1993, arrested on 26 October 2011, in Catania (Sicily).
- Sebastiano Pelle ('Ndrangheta), wanted since 1995, arrested on 10 November 2011, in Reggio Calabria (Calabria).
- Michele Zagaria (Camorra), wanted since 1995, arrested on 7 December 2011, in Casapesenna (Campania).

=== 2012 ===
- Vito Badalamenti (Cosa Nostra), wanted since 1995, statute of limitations declared expired on 29 March 2012.
- Francesco Matrone (Camorra), wanted since 2007, arrested on 17 August 2012, in Battipaglia (Campania).
- Domenico Condello ('Ndrangheta), wanted since 1993, arrested on 10 October 2012, in Reggio Calabria (Calabria).

=== 2013 ===
- Michele Antonio Varano ('Ndrangheta), wanted since 2000, arrested on 12 May 2009, in Gandria (Switzerland), but released on 8 July 2009 by Swiss police. Varano was removed from the list in June 2013 and finally surrendered to the police on 2 December 2014 in Genoa.
- Francesco Nirta ('Ndrangheta), wanted since 2007, arrested on 20 September 2013, in Nieuwegein (Netherlands).

=== 2015 ===
- Pasquale Scotti (Camorra), wanted since 1984, arrested on 26 May 2015, in Recife (Brazil).

=== 2016 ===
- Ernesto Fazzalari ('Ndrangheta), wanted since 1996, arrested on 26 June 2016, near Molochio (Calabria).

=== 2017 ===
- Giuseppe Giorgi ('Ndrangheta), wanted since 1994, arrested on 2 June 2017, in San Luca (Calabria).

=== 2019 ===
- Marco Di Lauro (Camorra), wanted since 2004, arrested on 2 March 2019, in Naples (Campania).

=== 2021 ===
- Francesco Pelle ('Ndrangheta), wanted since 2019, arrested on 29 March 2021, in Lisbon (Portugal).
- Rocco Morabito ('Ndrangheta), wanted since 1994, arrested on 24 May 2021, in João Pessoa (Brazil).
- Raffaele Imperiale (Camorra), wanted since 2016, arrested on 4 August 2021, in Dubai (United Arab Emirates).
- Graziano Mesina (Anonima sarda), wanted since 2021, arrested on 18 December 2021, in Desulo (Sardinia).

=== 2023 ===
- Matteo Messina Denaro (Cosa Nostra), wanted since 1993, arrested on 16 January 2023, in Palermo.
- Pasquale Bonavota ('Ndrangheta), wanted since 2018, arrested on 27 April 2023, in Genoa.

=== 2026 ===
- Roberto Mazzarella (Camorra), wanted since 2025, arrested on 4 April 2026, in Vietri sul Mare.
