= Luigi Esposito =

Italian criminal (born 1959)

- Mugshot of Luigi Esposito
- Born: 15 December 1959 (age 66); Marano di Napoli, Italy
- Other name: 'a celest
- Known for: Financial wizard of Camorra clans
- Status: Incarcerated
- Allegiance: Polverino clan (formerly Nuvoletta clan)

Luigi Esposito (Italian pronunciation: [luˈiːdʒi eˈspɔːzito]; born 15 December 1959), also known as Celeste ("Sky-blue"), is an Italian criminal and a member of the Neapolitan Camorra.

== Criminal career ==
Esposito was a member of the Nuvoletta clan and close to the boss Angelo Nuvoletta. He is considered to be the financial wizard of the clan. In 1981, he received his first conviction for illegal possession of firearms. After years working for the Nuvoletta clan, Esposito started to work for the Polverino clan, and according to reports, was able to quadruple the money of the organization.

In 2003, he became a fugitive when arrest warrants were issued on charges of drug trafficking. During the investigations, police discovered that he had constructed tourist resort in Tenerife on the Canary Islands. In 2006, he was convicted and sentenced to nine years of imprisonment for drug trafficking and mafia association. In 2005, his assets worth 1.5 million were seized.

In July 2009, he was put on the list of most wanted fugitives in Italy of the Italian ministry of the Interior. He was arrested on 7 November 2009 in a luxury villa in Posillipo, a residential quarter of Naples.

Esposito was released from prison in 2017, but was rearrested in September 2019, after a police operation against the Polverino clan.
