= Di Rienzo =

di Rienzo, de Rienzo or Rienzo is a surname of Italian origin. Notable people with this name include:

- Andre Rienzo (born 1988), Brazilian baseball pitcher for the Chicago White Sox
- Cola di Rienzo (c. 1313–1354), Italian politician and popular leader
- Franca di Rienzo, Swiss/Italian singer
- Libero De Rienzo (1977–2021), Italian film actor, director and screenwriter
