= Fort Apache Napoli =

- Libero De Rienzo as Giancarlo Siani
- Italian: Fortapàsc
- Directed by: Marco Risi
- Screenplay by: Jim Carrington; Andrea Purgatori; Marco Risi; Maurizio Cerino
- Story by: Jim Carrington; Andrea Purgatori; Marco Risi
- Produced by: Angelo Barbagallo; Gianluca Curti
- Starring: Libero De Rienzo; Valentina Lodovini; Michele Riondino; Massimiliano Gallo; Ernesto Mahieux
- Cinematography: Marco Onorato
- Edited by: Clelio Benevento
- Music by: Franco Piersanti
- Production companies: BiBi Film; Rai Cinema; Minerva Pictures Group
- Distributed by: 01 Distribution
- Release date: 27 March 2009
- Running time: 113 minutes
- Country: Italy
- Language: Italian
- Box office: $785,422

Fort Apache Napoli (Italian: Fortapàsc) is a 2009 Italian biographical film directed by Marco Risi about the fight against the Camorra and subsequent assassination of journalist Giancarlo Siani, played by Libero De Rienzo.

== Plot ==
Giancarlo Siani is a young Neapolitan journalist who works in the editorial room of Il Mattino in Torre Annunziata. He works the crime beat (cronaca nera). While writing about crimes and murders by the Camorra, Siani begins to investigate the Camorra's alliances with the politicians of Torre Annunziata, and to discover large areas of corruption and collusion between politicians and organized crime.

Despite the somewhat veiled threats of the local political class, Siani continues his inquiries, especially after the "massacre of the circle of fishermen". His articles particularly annoy the local Camorra bosses because they undermine their political and criminal alliances mainly with the Valentino Gionta's arrest. After he is transferred to Naples by his paper, the Camorra meet and decide to kill Siani. Siani is shot outside his girlfriend's house, in the residential district of Vomero, on 23 September 1985. Siani was 26 years old.

== Cast ==
- Libero De Rienzo as Giancarlo Siani
- Valentina Lodovini as Daniela
- Michele Riondino as Rico
- Massimiliano Gallo as Valentino Gionta
- Ernesto Mahieux as Sasà
- Salvatore Cantalupo as Ferrara
- Gigio Morra as Carmine Alfieri
- Gianfranco Gallo as Gabriele Donnarumma
- Antonio Buonomo as Lorenzo Nuvoletta
- Roberto Calabrese as Hitman
- Raffaele Vassallo as Ciro
- Kiung Mi Lee as Yu
- Mimmo Mignemi as Cifù
- Salvatore Striano as Gionta's Hitman
- Ennio Fantastichini as Mayor Cassano
- Duccio Camerini as Angelo Nuvoletta
- Renato Carpentieri as Amato Lamberti
- Gianfelice Imparato as Magistrate Rosone
- Marcello Mazzarella as Sicilians' Emissary
- Daniele Pecci as Captain Sensales

== Soundtrack ==
The soundtrack includes the following tracks:

- Ogni Volta—Vasco Rossi
- La torre di Babele—Edoardo Bennato
- Tu ca nun chiagne—Ciro Capano
- Pe' sempre—Ciro Capano
- O bene mio—Ciro Capano
- Napule e—Pino Daniele
- Jesce sole—R. De Simone
- Centro di gravità permanente—Franco Battiato
- Pop corn e patatine—Nino D'Angelo
- Casanova '70—performed by Antonio Buonomo
- Dicitencello vuje—performed by Mario Abbate
- O ritratto 'e Nanninella—performed by Antonio Buonomo
- Nocturne from String Quartet No. 2 in D Major by A. Borodin—performed by the Pessoa Quartet (I Kyung Lee, Marco Quaranta, Rita Gucci, Achilles Taddeo)
- Quanno chiove—Pino Daniele
- River runs deep—JJ Cale
- Scumbinata—Mammoliti, Mambelli, Di Carlo, Poggiani
- Noi ragazzi di oggi—performed by Luis Miguel

== Accolades ==
Award	Date of ceremony	Category	Recipient(s) and nominee(s)	Result	Ref.
David di Donatello Awards	7 May 2010	Best Producer	Angelo Barbagallo and Gianluca Curti	Nominated	
David di Donatello Awards	7 May 2010	Best Actor	Libero De Rienzo	Nominated	
David di Donatello Awards	7 May 2010	Best Screenplay	Jim Carrington, Andrea Purgatori, Marco Risi, and Maurizio Cerino	Nominated	
Nastri d'Argento Awards	27 June 2009	Best Director	Marco Risi	Nominated	
Nastri d'Argento Awards	27 June 2009	Best Producer	Angelo Barbagallo and Gianluca Curti	Nominated	
Nastri d'Argento Awards	27 June 2009	Best Actor	Libero De Rienzo	Nominated	
Nastri d'Argento Awards	27 June 2009	Best Supporting Actor	Ernesto Mahieux	Nominated	
Nastri d'Argento Awards	27 June 2009	Best Screenplay	Jim Carrington, Andrea Purgatori, Marco Risi, and Maurizio Cerino	Nominated	
Nastri d'Argento Awards	27 June 2009	Best Cinematography	Marco Onorato	Nominated	
