= Camaldoli (disambiguation) =

Camaldoli may refer to:

- Camaldoli, frazione of the comune of Poppi, in Tuscany, Italy
- Camaldoli (Campagna), hamlet of the comune of Campagna in the Province of Salerno, Campania, Italy
- Camaldoli hill, the highest point of the city of Naples, Campania, Italy
- Hermitage of Camaldoli, a monastery near Naples, Campania, Italy
