= Giuseppe Nirta =

Giuseppe Nirta may refer to several members of the Nirta 'Ndrangheta clan from San Luca in Calabria:

- Giuseppe Nirta (born 1913) (1913–1995), 'Ndrangheta boss and brother of Antonio Nirta
- Giuseppe Nirta (born 1940) (1940–2023), head of the Nirta clan arrested in May 2008
- Giuseppe Nirta (born 1973), one of the triggerman in the Duisburg massacre on August 15, 2007
