= Luigi Putrone =

Member of the Sicilian Mafia

Mugshot of Luigi Putrone.

Luigi Putrone (Italian pronunciation: [luˈiːdʒi puˈtroːne]; born September 8, 1960, in Porto Empedocle) is a former Sicilian mafioso, considered to be head of a powerful Mafia clan based in Porto Empedocle, in the province of Agrigento.

He had been convicted in absentia to life in prison in July 2001 for a number of crimes committed in the 1980s and 1990s. In April 2004 he was sentenced to 18 years in prison for extortion committed against Agrigento businessmen. He also was involved in the kidnapping and murder of the 13-year-old Giuseppe Di Matteo, the son of Santino Di Matteo, a collaborating state witness (pentito), to force him to retract his testimony. Giuseppe Di Matteo was tortured before being strangled and his body was dissolved in a barrel of acid to destroy the evidence.

On August 12, 2005, Putrone, one of the most wanted men in Italy, was arrested in Ústí nad Labem with his accomplice Frantisek Herm in the Czech Republic, some 100 kilometres north-west of Prague.

Putrone had probably been living in the Czech Republic for several years since going on the run in 1998. He appeared to be a local businessman, using a stolen Italian passport under the name Umberto Bonfiglio – a surname meaning "good son."

The Czech Republic extradited Luigi Putrone to Italy where he had been sentenced to life imprisonment for mafia conspiracy (associazione mafiosa) and murder. In September 2006, he decided to become a pentito.

In Italy the book "Addio Mafia", published by Fuoririga, had a great success, which contains a long interview with Luigi Putrone reached in a secret location. The book was written by the investigative journalist Gero Tedesco and his colleague Gerlando Cardinale.
