= Ernesto Fazzalari =

Ernesto Fazzalari (Italian pronunciation: [erˈnɛsto fattsaˈlaːri]; born September 16, 1969, in Taurianova) is an Italian criminal and a member of the 'Ndrangheta, a Mafia-type organisation in Calabria.

== Biography ==
Fazzalari was born in Taurianova, a town at about 40 km northeast of Reggio Calabria. He belongs to the Zagari-Fazzalari 'ndrina, which he heads together with Carmelo Zagari. Fazzalari is engaged with Rosa Zagaria.

The clan controls all land transactions in the area of Taurianova. From 1989-1991 the clan was involved in a bloody feud with the rival Asciutto-Neri-Grimaldi 'ndrina, which left 32 dead in Taurianova in a few years.

Fazzalari was a fugitive from June 1996 to June 2016 and was wanted for serious crimes like murder, drug trafficking, arms trafficking, armed robbery and Mafia association. He has been included on the list of most wanted fugitives in Italy.

In 1999, Fazzalari was put on trial in absentia and received a life sentence for his role in the Taurianova feud. In January 2004, the Carabinieri found the hide-out of Fazzalari, an underground bunker under a farmhouse near Taurianova with a tunnel that ended in the woods. Fazzalari was not found, but his two assistants were arrested. In the "five star" bunker, police found exquisite wines and champagne, as well as Cuban cigars.

Fazzalari was arrested on June 26, 2016, near Molochio, not far from his criminal feud in Taurianova.
