= Nuvoletta clan =

Former Camorra clan

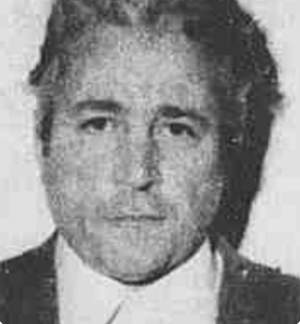
- Lorenzo Nuvoletta Angelo Nuvoletta
- Founded: 1960s
- Founded by: Lorenzo Nuvoletta; Angelo Nuvoletta
- Founding location: Marano di Napoli
- Years active: 1960s-2000s
- Territory: Marano di Napoli and numerous territories in the northwest area of the Province of Naples.
- Ethnicity: Campanian
- Criminal activities: Racketeering, cigarette smuggling, drug trafficking, loan sharking, prostitution, counterfeiting, extortion, murder, gambling and Money laundering
- Allies: Cosa Nostra; Corleonesi; Polverino clan Orlando clan Licciardi clan Lubrano-Ligato clan (defunct)
- Rivals: Alfieri clan (defunct); Galasso clan (defunct); Casalesi clan

The Nuvoletta clan was a powerful Neapolitan Camorra clan operating from the town of Marano di Napoli, situated on the northern outskirts of the city of Naples, southern Italy. The Nuvolettas belonged to a new style of Camorra, one that had the dimensions of a large corporation and was considered much more entrepreneurial.

The clan was affiliated with Sicilian Mafia families and was considered one of the most powerful Camorra clans between the 1970s and 1990s, however, since the death of its historical leaders and the large number of arrests and seizures made by the Italian police, the clan was succeeded by the Polverino and Orlando clans, both families with great degree of kinship with the Nuvoletta family.

== History ==
=== Background ===
The Nuvoletta family was historically a very prominent family dedicated to numerous legal businesses and known to the media at least since the 1950s. In the 1960s, Ciro, Lorenzo and Angelo Nuvoletta initially joined the clan of Antonio Maisto who was dealing in contraband cigarettes. After their early exploits with the Maisto clan, they diversified and became significant landowners using state funds designed to set up small agricultural landholdings. They made their fortune swindling the Italian government and the European Economic Community (EEC) and intimidating insurance officials, as well as local farmers who took loans from finance companies managed by the Nuvolettas. During the 1980s the Nuvoletta clan transformed into an international holding investing in agriculture, cleaning contracts, construction, drugs, fraud, stud farming and hotels. The legal assets of the clan amounted to US$280 million around 1990.

The Nuvoletta clan first began to appear in the news at the same time the Nuova Famiglia (NF) was formed. The NF was a federation of Camorra clans which apart from the Nuovoletta clan, consisted of Michele Zaza (a Camorra boss with strong ties with Cosa Nostra), the Gionta clan (from Torre Annunziata), Antonio Bardellino from San Cipriano d'Aversa and Casal di Principe, the Alfieri clan led by Carmine Alfieri, the Galasso clan of Poggiomarino (led by Pasquale Galasso), the Fabbrocino clan of the Vesuvius area (led by Mario Fabbrocino), the Giuliano clan from Naples' quarter Forcella (led by Luigi Giuliano) and the Vollaro clan from Portici (led by Luigi Vollaro). It was formed to contrast the growing power of Raffaele Cutolo's Nuova Camorra Organizzata (NCO).

=== 1980s ===
In June 1984, the Nuvoletta clan became the target of a violent escalation in the internal conflict between factions of the Nuova Famiglia. On 10 June 1984, a commando of approximately fifteen armed men led by Antonio Bardellino attacked the Nuvoletta stronghold at Poggio Vallesana. The assailants, disguised with wigs and fake beards, stormed the estate using submachine guns, pistols, and rifles. During the assault, Ciro Nuvoletta, one of the Nuvoletta brothers, was killed with a final execution-style shot.

Two months later, the conflict widened to include the clan’s closest allies. On 26 August 1984, during the feast day of Saint Alexander, a bus carrying fourteen armed men arrived outside the Circolo dei Pescatori in Torre Annunziata. The gunmen opened fire on individuals linked to Valentino Gionta, the closest ally of the Nuvolettas, killing eight people in what became one of the deadliest attacks connected to the feud between the Nuova Famiglia factions.

At the same time, judicial pressure on the Nuvoletta clan intensified. During the summer of 1984, Italian magistrates launched extensive asset seizures against the organization. Authorities confiscated property estimated at around fifty billion lire, including landholdings in the province of Caserta, apartments in Marano and Naples, shares in six companies, and a horse-breeding business. Investigators also further reconstructed the clan’s criminal structure through the testimony of major Sicilian Mafia pentiti, including Tommaso Buscetta and Salvatore Contorno.

In late spring 1985, the clan suffered another setback when Valentino Gionta was arrested in Marano after a prolonged period in hiding allegedly protected by Lorenzo Nuvoletta. On 10 June 1985, the newspaper Il Mattino published an article by journalist Giancarlo Siani suggesting that Gionta’s arrest had resulted from information provided by the Nuvoletta clan as part of a pact with Bardellino to end their conflict and reorganize criminal interests in the Vesuvian area. Siani’s article was interpreted by the Nuvoletta clan as an accusation of betrayal and collaboration with law enforcement. According to later testimony by pentiti, Lorenzo Nuvoletta considered the report a serious affront to the clan’s honor. On 23 September 1985, Giancarlo Siani was murdered while parking his car in Piazza Leonardo in the Vomero district of Naples.

For several years, investigations into the killing followed misleading leads. In July 1993, pentito Salvatore Migliorino testified to prosecutor Armando D'Alterio that the order to assassinate Siani had come from the Nuvoletta clan in retaliation for the article published in Il Mattino. Additional testimony from Camorra member Ferdinando Cataldo confirmed that Lorenzo Nuvoletta viewed the accusations as defamatory and demanded Siani’s execution.

Several members of the Nuvoletta clan, including Angelo Nuvoletta, were later convicted as organizers and perpetrators of the murder. Although Italian courts established judicial responsibility for the assassination, debate has continued among journalists and historians regarding the full motives behind the killing of Giancarlo Siani.

== Links with Cosa Nostra ==
The clan's regent Lorenzo Nuvoletta was the heir to a family of landowners. His grandfather and then mother had accumulated large areas of land, with its fruit crops exported to other areas. The Nuvolettas had many significant and powerful contacts within the Sicilian Mafia, as a result of their relationship with the Sciorio family. Lorenzo's many telephone calls with Luciano Leggio, boss of the Corleonesi, were frequently intercepted by the Carabinieri. The Mafia "supergrasses", Tommaso Buscetta, Antonio Calderone and Salvatore Contorno, confirmed that the Nuvolettas had very close links with the Sicilian Mafia.

While testifying in court, the Sicilian Mafia boss Tommaso Buscetta, who became a pentito (collaborator with Italian Justice), spoke of Lorenzo Nuvoletta:

In Campania, there are three Mafia families, led by Michele Zaza, Antonio Bardellino and the Nuvoletta brothers. But Campania is represented in the cupola (Sicilian Mafia commission) by the oldest of the Nuvoletta brothers, Lorenzo.

Likewise, the Catania Mafia member, Antonino Calderone, recalled:

In 1974, during one of my visits to Naples, an old man of honor originally from Palermo, who lived in a building in the Santa Lucia area, told me of the family (i.e, the Mafia) that went back to the 1930s. The most important members of the family in Naples were the Mazzarella, Nuvoletta and Zaza brothers. Then, there were other people such as Nunzio Barbarossa, the Sciorio brothers, and others. The entire Naples family was controlled by Michele Greco, but within it the Nuvoletta clan had about ten members, with an even closer and more direct relationship with Michele Greco, who could control them without the mediation of the family itself.

After his collaboration with Italian Justice in 1992, Galasso clan boss Pasquale Galasso revealed details of further meetings held at Nuvoletta's villas in 1981. He mentioned that these meetings frequently involved representatives of all the major Camorra clans, with usually a hundred people present, many of them fugitives, as well as dozens of cars. He explained:

Our worries arose from the possibility that the police would arrive during our meetings and cause a bloodbath, yet Nuvoletta always managed to calm us down. Sometimes, when Carmine Alfieri and I looked out at his farmhouse when leaving Vallesana, we saw police cars parked outside Nuvoletta's house. That proved to us he was well protected ...in the course of these meetings we had to sort out once and for all the tensions Cutolo had created. I can recall that Riina, Provenzano and Bagarella were in Nuvoletta's farmhouse at the same time.

== Structure ==
The clan was ruled by the three Nuvoletta brothers: Lorenzo, Ciro, and Angelo. Lorenzo died in 1994 after a serious illness; Ciro, the most bloodthirsty of the group, was killed in 1984 in an armed attack on orders from the Alfieri-Bardellino-Galasso. Angelo was the smartest of the brothers and literally the "brains" of the group, who was entrusted with the economic management of the group. Angelo was eventually arrested in May 2001, after having been on the list of 30 most dangerous fugitives in Italy since 1995. He was sentenced to life imprisonment for the murder of journalist Giancarlo Siani.

Compared to the other Camorra clan in the 1980s and early 1990s, the Nuvoletta clan was almost unique in that they never had any high-level pentito. According to judge Giuseppe Borrelli, they were able to insulate themselves by adopting the cellular structure dominant within the Sicilian Mafia. As he explained:

They have a system of decine and capodecine. So, the few supergrasses we've had from their ranks haven't been in a position to tell us very much. This is the main reason they have been able to resist investigative work. Each decina doesn't know anybody outside their own decina, they don't know anything about the activities of other decine. Only the capodecine have a larger picture. Angelo Nuvoletta doesn't get involved at all in the day to day running of these activities, he only intervenes when capital needs to be invested or when disputes arise. This system of operating is a real anomaly for a Camorra gang.

== Activities ==
The Nuvoletta clan is involved in mostly white collar rackets such as construction, supply of public entities, concrete manufacturing companies, cleaning companies and control of the operations of hotels. This is its economic empire as reconstructed by Anti-Mafia investigators, an empire with an annual turnover of 1,200 billion lire. A census taken of the part of their income from illegal activities in 1985, was estimated to be around 100,000 billion lire. In the early 1990s, this increased to 120,000 billion lire. Of these, 40,000 billion lire were proceeds from drug trafficking, and 30,000 billion lire were from extortion.

== Present day ==
After being decimated by the arrests of most of its affiliates and the death of its historical leaders, groups that were formerly Nuvoletta's ramifications, such as the Orlando and the Polverino clans, became independent and powerful, inheriting much of what was once the Nuvoletta clan. In fact, the Polverino clan is considered their successor on the territory of Marano and surrounding areas.
