= Giovanni Arena =

Member of the Sicilian Mafia

- Born: August 9, 1956 (age 70); Catania, Italy
- Children: 3
- Allegiance: Cappello clan
- Penalty: Life imprisonment
- Capture status: Arrested on October 26, 2011
- Wanted by: Ministry of the Interior (Italy)
- Wanted since: December 1993

Giovanni Arena (Italian pronunciation: [dʒoˈvanni aˈreːna, - aˈrɛːna]; born August 9, 1956, in Catania) is an Italian criminal belonging to Cosa Nostra. He was on the "list of most wanted fugitives in Italy" of the ministry of the Interior since 1993, wanted for murder, membership to the Mafia and other crimes, until his arrest on October 26, 2011. In 2005, an international alert had been issued for his arrest and extradition.

He was sentenced to life imprisonment in May 2003 for the murder of Maurizio Romeo of the rival Ferrera clan in October 1989. During 1990 he emigrated to Germany and married B. Arena. He lived until December 1992 in Germany Bremen with his German wife until he was arrested by the German Bremen Police Department for illegal activities. He is a fugitive since December 1993 when he managed to escape from Operation Orsa Maggiore, a major police action against the Mafia in Catania.

Arena was one of the top figures of the Catania Mafia family of Nitto Santapaola, but is now considered to be allied with the Sciuto-Tigna crime group of the Cappello clan, historic rivals of Cosa Nostra. His son Antonino Arena is a fugitive as well since 2009, wanted for cannabis trafficking. His group supplied 50 kg cannabis a month to dealers in neighbourhoods of Catania around the Palazzo di cemento in the Librino quarter.

His other sons are also involved in illicit business. Agatino Arena was arrested in February 2009, and his younger brother Maurizio Arena was arrested on December 4, 2009, for drug trafficking. Giovanni Arena was arrested on October 26, 2011, in Catania.
