= Umberto Bellocco =

Italian criminal (1937–2022)

- Born: 17 December 1937; Rosarno, Calabria, Italy
- Died: 22 October 2022 (aged 84)
- Other names: Assu i mazzi
- Known for: Capobastone of the Bellocco 'ndrina
- Criminal status: Imprisoned from 1993 till death
- Allegiance: Bellocco 'ndrina, 'Ndrangheta

Umberto Bellocco (Italian pronunciation: [umˈbɛrto belˈlɔkko]; 17 December 1937 – 22 October 2022) was an Italian criminal and a member of the 'Ndrangheta, a mafia-type organisation in Calabria. He was the capobastone and founder of the Bellocco 'ndrina from the 1960s until his arrest in 1993.

== Biography ==
At the beginning of the 1980s, he was involved in setting up the Sacra Corona Unita (SCU), a mafia-type organization in Apulia, to counter the growing influence of the Camorra. On his instigation Giuseppe Rogoli imported the codes, structure, and initiation rites of the 'Ndrangheta to be used by the SCU.

Bellocco was arrested in June 1983 in Lecce in Apulia. He was sentenced to three years for illegal possession of firearms. In the subsequent years, he faced multiple charges for extortion, drug trafficking, and Mafia association. At some point, he was charged with and acquitted of 14 murders. He was sentenced to 14 years for drug trafficking. In July 1988, he was released because the terms of detention expired, and became a fugitive.

Bellocco became a member of Camera di Controllo, a provincial commission of the 'Ndrangheta formed to avoid further internal conflicts at the end of the Second 'Ndrangheta war in September 1991.

Bellocco was arrested again on 18 February 1993 and was in prison. He was succeeded as acting boss by his cousins Gregorio Bellocco, arrested in February 2005, and Giuseppe Bellocco, arrested in July 2007.

Bellocco died on 22 October 2022, at the age of 84.
