= Renato Cinquegranella =

Italian criminal and member of the Camorra (born 1949)

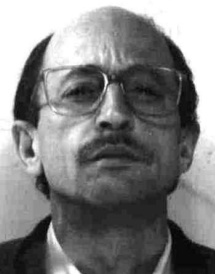
- Born: 15 May 1949 (age 77); Naples, Italy
- Occupation: Member of the Camorra
- Height: 1.65 m (5 ft 5 in)
- Status: Fugitive
- Allegiance: Camorra
- Criminal charges: Mafia association, murder, illegal possession of weapons, extortion

Renato Cinquegranella (Italian: [reˈnaːto ˌtʃinkweɡraˈnɛlla]; born 15 May 1949) is an Italian criminal and a member of the Camorra. Cinquegranella is on the "List of most wanted fugitives in Italy" of the ministry of the Interior.

== Biography ==
Renato Cinquegranella was born in Naples. In the 1980s he was linked to the Nuova Famiglia and according to investigators, he was involved in the murder of Giacomo Frattini, known as 'Bambulella', a young affiliate of the Nuova Camorra Organizzata of Raffaele Cutolo. Frattini was tortured, killed and torn to pieces in January 1982, to avenge the murder in prison of a loyalist of the then Secondigliano's flamboyant boss, Aniello La Monica. Bambulella was found wrapped in a sheet in the trunk of a car with a disfigured face, while his hands and heart were found closed in two plastic bags inside the car. In May 2014, Cinquegranella and other Camorristi were confirmed to have received life sentences for the crime.

In the 1980s, Cinquegranella was also accused of giving refuge in his villa in Castel Volturno to terrorists belonging to the Red Brigades.

== Fugitive ==
Since 2002, Cinquegranella is on the list of most wanted fugitives in Italy for mafia association, murder, illegal possession of weapons and extortion.

Since 7 December 2018, international searches have been launched for his arrest for extradition purposes.
