= Sacra Corona =

Sacra Corona may refer to:

- Holy Crown of Hungary, playing an important role in the history of the Kingdom of Hungary, going as far as obtaining legal personhood
- Sacra Corona Unita, an Italian criminal organization
