= Evilenko =

- UK DVD cover
- Directed by: David Grieco
- Written by: David Grieco
- Produced by: Mario Cotone
- Starring: Malcolm McDowell; Marton Csokas; Ronald Pickup; Frances Barber; John Benfield; Vernon Dobtcheff
- Cinematography: Fabio Zamarion
- Edited by: Francesco Bilotti; Massimo Fiocchi
- Music by: Angelo Badalamenti; Dolores O'Riordan
- Production companies: Pacific Pictures; MiBAC
- Distributed by: Mikado (Italy); TLA Releasing (UK); Jinga Films
- Release date: 16 April 2004 (Italy)
- Running time: 111 minutes
- Country: Italy
- Language: English
- Budget: $9.7 million

Evilenko is a 2004 English-language Italian crime horror thriller film very loosely based on the Ukrainian-born Soviet serial killer Andrei Chikatilo. Written and directed by David Grieco in his theatrical feature directorial debut, the film stars Malcolm McDowell, Marton Csokas, and Ronald Pickup.

== Plot ==
In 1984, in Kyiv, schoolteacher Andrej Romanovich Evilenko is dismissed from his position after attempting to rape a pupil. Driven by his psychopathic urges and embittered by the collapse of the Soviet Union, Evilenko begins to rape, kill, and cannibalise women and children. It is hinted throughout the movie that Evilenko somehow gained the power to hypnotise his victims, which accounts for their lack of resistance and his continuous evasion of the authorities.

Vadim Timurouvic Lesiev, a magistrate and family man, is assigned to catch the serial killer. For years, Evilenko eludes Lesiev and psychiatrist Aron Richter, who is assigned to profile the killer. Richter eventually finds Evilenko with a little girl and manages to break Evilenko's hypnotic hold on her, but is killed by Evilenko in retaliation; although it appears to Evilenko that she is run over by a train, the girl escapes alive.

Almost two years later, Lesiev finally captures Evilenko, who by now has killed 55 people, mostly children and young women. On 22 May 1992, Evilenko goes to court, and on 14 February 1994, he is finally executed. Before his execution, two governments expressed interest in Evilenko's psychic abilities and asked for extradition of Evilenko but were denied.

== Cast ==
- Malcolm McDowell as Andrei Romanovich Evilenko
- Marton Csokas as Vadim Timurovich Lesiev
- Ronald Pickup as Aron Richter
- Frances Barber as Fenya Evilenka
- John Benfield as Oleg Chivadze
- Alexei Chadyuk as Captain Ramensky
- Ostap Stupka as Doctor Amitrin
- Vernon Dobtcheff as Bagdasarov
- Adrian McCourt as Surinov
- Ruby Kammer as Tonya

== Production ==
The story is a fictionalization of the life and crimes of serial killer Andrei Chikatilo. Large segments of the film were adapted from Grieco's novel entitled The Communist Who Ate Children. The character is renamed Andrei Evilenko in reference to Chikatilo.

== Soundtrack ==
The soundtrack was composed by Angelo Badalamenti and features two tracks with Dolores O'Riordan, "Angels Go to Heaven" and "No Way Out". It has been released in 2004 on CD digipak by Italian music label Minus Habens Records.

== See also ==
- Andrei Chikatilo
- Citizen X
