= Mafianeindanke =

mafianeindanke (Mafia? No Thanks!) is an anti-Mafia movement that was created in Germany after the Duisburg massacre in August 2007. Born from an idea by Laura Garavini, mafianeindanke has been part since January 2010 of the association network Flare, and it is active in the defense of legality in Germany.

== Origins ==
On 15 August 2007 in Duisburg in North Rhine-Westphalia in front of the Italian restaurant Da Bruno six people belonging to the 'Ndrangheta were killed in a blood feud between 'Ndrangheta families. The event is remembered as the Duisburg massacre.

In response to the fragmented representation of the problem of Italian organized crime in Germany, often based on superficial stereotypes, a group of Italian immigrants in Berlin decided to commit to propose to the German civil society a more coherent and thorough reflection and analysis on the issue of mafia in Germany. Inspired by other movements to protect legality in Italy, such as Addiopizzo and Libera, mafianeindanke pursues the following objectives:

- Counter the activities of Mafia-like criminal organizations in Germany;
- Raise public awareness and the German political class about the problem of organized crime in Germany, for the recognition of the Mafia as a purely extra-national and, contrasting with greater collaboration between states, especially members of the European Union;
- Affirm and defend the value of law and the shared awareness that only respecting the rules can be the basis of any modern democratic society;
- Maintain and constantly monitor the activities of the Mafia in Germany trying to showcase the work of journalists, magistrates and police involved in fighting criminal organizations;
- Support and promote education projects aimed at enhancing the importance of legality;
- Offer a point of reference for all those who, feeling threatened by gangs, they need to listen, support, advice, mafianeindanke therefore intends to keep alive the memory of all those who have suffered threats and retaliation by criminal mafias.

== Activities ==
Immediately after the Duisburg massacre, in December 2007 members of one clan of the Camorra attempted to extort money to some restaurateurs in Berlin. mafianeindanke enabled these entrepreneurs to unite and to facilitate communication with the police, and the report of attempted extortion. The criminals were later arrested.

During 2008 mafianeindanke organized a number of initiatives aimed at proposing a public reflection on the topic of organized crime and the means necessary to combat it. Thus, it became clear to the founders that is necessary to discuss systematically the delay of the German legal system with regards to the fight to Mafia.

Through collaborations with journalists, politicians, judges and representatives of civil society, mafianeindanke attempted to draw attention on the harmonization of European legal systems. Following a conference held in Berlin in March 2009 mafianeindanke had its first nationwide success in Germany when in July the German Parliament finally introduced a European Directive to recognize rulings of other member states of the Union.

mafianeindanke intends to continue the work done so far to introduce in Germany as well as in all EU countries the category of criminal association and push for confiscation to be used as a fundamental weapon in the fight against organized crime.
