= Carmelo Barbaro =

Italian convicted murder

- Born: June 23, 1948 (age 78)
- Organization: De Stefano 'ndrina / 'Ndrangheta
- Criminal charges: Criminal association and murder
- Penalty: 22 years, 5 months jail term

Details
- Date apprehended: September 2009

Carmelo Barbaro (Italian pronunciation: [karˈmɛːlo ˈbarbaro]; born 23 June 1948) is an Italian criminal belonging to the 'Ndrangheta, a criminal organisation in Calabria. Born in Reggio Calabria, he had been a fugitive since 2001, wanted for criminal association and murder, for which he has been convicted to 22 years and five months. He was included on the list of most wanted fugitives in Italy, until his arrest in September 2009.

He is considered to be an important member of the De Stefano-Tegano alliance in Reggio Calabria. According to some government informers Barbaro was involved in several murders during the second 'Ndrangheta war in 1985–1991 against the Condello-Imerti clan that cost some 600 lives. He was close to the boss Orazio De Stefano, and had a killer squad under his command.

In April 2008, authorities seized assets worth one million euro invested in two construction companies, buildings and land that belonged to Barbaro. He was arrested on 12 September 2009 in the city of Reggio Calabria, while undergoing plastic surgery.
