= Medma =

Ancient Greek city of Southern Italy

- Medma (Greek)
- Location within Italy
- 38°29′16″N 15°59′0″E
- Type: Settlement
- Location: Rosarno, Province of Reggio Calabria, Calabria, Italy
- Region: Magna Graecia

Medma, or Mesma (Greek: Μέδμη, Steph. B.; Μέδμα, Strabo, Scymn. Ch.; but Μέσμα on coins, and so Apollodorus of Damascus, cited by Steph. B.; Scylax has Μέσα, evidently a corruption for Μέσμα), was an ancient Greek city of Magna Graecia, on the west coast of the Bruttian (now Calabrian) peninsula, between Hipponium and the mouth of the Metaurus (probably today's River Petrace). The site is located at Rosarno, Province of Reggio Calabria, Calabria.

It was a colony founded by the Epizephyrian Locrians, and is said to have derived its name from an adjoining fountain. But though it is repeatedly noticed among the Greek cities in this part of Italy, it does not appear ever to have attained to any great power or importance. It is probable, however, that the Medimnaeans (Μεδιμναῖοι), who are noticed by Diodorus as contributing a body of colonists to the repeopling of Messana (modern Messina) by Dionysius in 396 BCE, are no other than the Medmaeans, and that we should read Μεδμαῖοι in the passage in question. Though never a very conspicuous place, Medma seems to have survived the fall of many other more important cities of Magna Graecia, and it is noticed as a still existing town both by Strabo and Pliny the Elder. But the name is not found in Ptolemy, and all subsequent trace of it disappears. It appears from Strabo that the town itself was situated a little inland, and that it had a port or emporium on the seashore.

The name of Mesima is still borne by a river which flows into the sea a little below Nicotera, in the neighbourhood. Nicotera, the name of which is already found in the Antonine Itinerary, probably arose after the decline of Mesma.

A pair of terracotta altars from Medma with the myth of Aphrodite and Adonis dating back to the 4th century BC was probably stolen in the early 20th century and is now exhibited at the J. Paul Getty Museum of Los Angeles.
