= Lorenzo Nuvoletta =

Italian clan leader

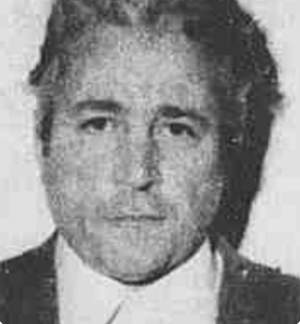
- Born: January 1, 1931; Marano di Napoli, Italy
- Died: April 7, 1994 (aged 63); Marano di Napoli, Italy
- Known for: Head of the Nuvoletta clan
- Allegiance: Nuvoletta clan / Camorra

Lorenzo Nuvoletta (January 1, 1931 – April 7, 1994) was the head of the Nuvoletta clan, a Neapolitan Camorra organization that operated from the town of Marano di Napoli, situated on the northern outskirts of the city of Naples. Nuvoletta was considered one of the most powerful bosses in the entire Camorra from the 1970s to the early 1990s.

== Biography ==
Lorenzo Nuvoletta and his brothers Ciro, Gaetano and Angelo were the heirs to a family of landowners. His grandfather and mother had accumulated large areas of land, with its fruit crops exported to other areas. The Nuvolettas were probably involved in intimidating local peasants into selling them land in Marano during the late 1950s.

In the early 1960s, Lorenzo and his brothers became members of the Camorra clan led by Antonio Maisto, then regarded as the dominant criminal organization in the area north of Naples, initially joining the clan as minor members. After their early exploits with the Maisto clan, they diversified and became significant landowners using state funds designed to set up small agricultural landholdings. They made their fortune swindling the Italian government and the European Economic Community (EEC) and intimidating insurance officials, as well as local farmers who took loans from finance companies managed by the Nuvolettas.

Maria Orlando, the mother of Lorenzo Nuvoletta, was officially presented as a businesswoman in the fruit, vegetable, and poultry trade, even supplying public institutions and a military base in Caserta. In 1975, she and Antonietta Di Costanzo, Lorenzo’s aunt, became involved in the company Stella d’Oriente, officially active in the frozen fish trade but regarded by investigators as a vehicle for laundering illicit money. Despite suspicions surrounding Lorenzo Nuvoletta’s criminal connections, Maria Orlando’s businesses continued to maintain an appearance of legitimacy and secured contracts with public bodies.

In April 1980, Nuvoletta came out of anonymity to the police when, during a search of the home of Francesco Di Carlo, boss of the Altofonte Mafia family of the Cosa Nostra, a photograph was found showing him alongside Antonino Gioè and other mafiosi. The Carabinieri captain Emanuele Basile showed the photo to judge Paolo Borsellino, who was unable to recognize Nuvoletta.

According to the account later provided by the pentito Carmine Alfieri, meetings were also held at the Poggio Vallesana estate, involving political figures, including one that allegedly took place between 1980 and 1981 with Antonio Gava, who was arrested and tried for external complicity in mafia association, and ultimately acquitted. Representatives of all Camorra families were said to have been present. The central issue discussed would have been the concern over the possible electoral overtaking of the Christian Democracy by the Italian Communist Party. According to this version of events, the politician allegedly asked those present to provide support in order to prevent such an outcome. Subsequently, both Pasquale Galasso and Giovanni Brusca reportedly also spoke about the relationships between Lorenzo Nuvoletta and the former minister.

=== Links with the Sicilian Mafia ===
Apart from being a member of the Camorra, Lorenzo Nuvoletta was also initiated in the Sicilian Mafia. According to Mafia turncoat (pentito) Tommaso Buscetta he was close to Luciano Leggio and Salvatore Riina and his Corleonesi, as well as Michele Greco, to which Mafia family the Nuvoletta clan answered. According to Mafia boss Giuseppe Di Cristina, the Nuvolettas managed a deposit and possibly a heroin refinery on Liggio's behalf. Several Camorra and Mafia clans struck a deal on the division of the shiploads of contraband cigarettes arriving in the port of Naples at a meeting in 1974 in the villa of Lorenzo Nuvoletta in Marano. With Umberto Ammaturo, the clan also engaged in cocaine trafficking.

=== War against Cutolo ===
The Nuvolettas, and in particular Lorenzo as one of the most charismatic members of the entire organisation, were important members of the Nuova Famiglia (NF) a coalition of Camorra clans created in the 1980s to face Raffaele Cutolo's Nuova Camorra Organizzata (NCO). Cutolo wanted to unite the Camorra under his leadership. The support of the Sicilian Mafia was crucial in the war between the NF and the NCO, which ended with the defeat of Cutolo. However, with Cutolo and the NCO out of the picture, the NF alliance soon disintegrated, with a war breaking out between the clan headed by Antonio Bardellino and the Nuvolettas. On 10 June 1984, a commando of approximately fifteen armed men led by Bardellino attacked the Nuvoletta stronghold at Poggio Vallesana. The assailants, disguised with wigs and fake beards, stormed the estate using submachine guns, pistols, and rifles. During the assault, Ciro Nuvoletta was killed with a final execution-style shot.

=== Murder of Giancarlo Siani ===
In late spring 1985, Lorenzo Nuvoletta lost one of his closest allies when Valentino Gionta was arrested in Marano after a lengthy period in hiding allegedly protected by the Nuvoletta clan. On 10 June 1985, journalist Giancarlo Siani published an article in Il Mattino claiming that Gionta’s arrest may have resulted from information provided by the Nuvoletta clan as part of a pact with Bardellino to end the conflict between their clans and reorganize criminal interests in the Vesuvian area. According to later informants testimony, Lorenzo Nuvoletta reacted with anger to the article because it implied that the clan had collaborated with law enforcement. Witnesses later stated that Nuvoletta considered the accusation an attack on the clan’s honor and reputation. Prosecutors concluded that the article was the principal motive behind the decision to murder Siani.

On 23 September 1985, Siani was assassinated in Piazza Leonardo, in the Vomero district of Naples, while parking his car outside his home. He had turned 27 four days earlier. Initial investigations followed several misleading theories and failed to immediately identify the perpetrators. In July 1993, Camorra pentito Salvatore Migliorino informed prosecutor Armando D'Alterio that the order to kill Siani had come from the Nuvoletta clan in retaliation for the article published in Il Mattino. Further testimony came from Camorra member Ferdinando Cataldo, who stated that Lorenzo Nuvoletta had become “nervous” over the accusations contained in the article and rejected the suggestion that the clan had acted as informants. According to Cataldo, Nuvoletta declared that Siani “had to be killed” because the article had brought “calumny” upon the Nuvolettas. Several members of the Nuvoletta clan, including Angelo Nuvoletta, were later convicted as organizers and perpetrators of the assassination.

=== Arrest ===
In 1984, the Antimafia judge Giovanni Falcone issued an arrest warrant against Nuvoletta for mafia association.

On December 7, 1990, after ten years as a fugitive, Lorenzo Nuvoletta was arrested by ten Carabinieri led by Captain Luigi Cortellessa. The authorities knew he had never left Marano and were able to track him to his farmhouse near Poggio Vallesana. That evening, Nuvoletta left his hideout to visit his wife and children, feeling safe. At 6:10 p.m., the Carabinieri entered the property through a broken electronic gate, silenced a warning by a woman, and captured him without resistance. Nuvoletta, calm and composed, greeted the police politely, remarking, "You have done well". At the time, he was wanted under arrest warrants issued in Naples and Palermo for numerous crimes, including mafia ties, business dealings in construction and cleaning, and widespread extortion. He was seated at the farmhouse with five others, including his son Ciro and a local municipal councilor, when he surrendered, showing his characteristic composure and low profile. In January 1992, he was sentenced to nine years for Mafia association.

=== Death ===
Nuvoletta, who had been battling liver cancer, saw his health worsen on 16 February 1994 and, upon request of his lawyers, he was transferred from Niguarda Hospital in Milan to the Pascale Institute in Naples, specialized in cancer treatment. As his condition became terminal, he was granted house arrest with restrictions, including a ban on telephone communication and permission to receive visits only from close relatives. His illness progressed rapidly, and he died at around 8 a.m. on 7 April 1994. Following his death, approximately two hundred people attended to pay their respects, under strict police and carabinieri surveillance at Poggio Vallesana and surrounding areas. According to his explicit wish expressed shortly before his death, no flowers were present at the funeral. The funeral was restricted by order of the Naples police chief, Ciro Lomastro, who banned public ceremonies.

Security forces maintained a strong presence during the burial, including around one hundred police officers at the cemetery. Tensions arose when police prevented family members from carrying the coffin, leading to protests. The funeral service was held in the family chapel in the presence of close relatives only, with both police and carabinieri also deployed in Marano to prevent any public displays of mourning or business closures.
