= La macchinazione =

- Directed by: David Grieco
- Screenplay by: Guido Bulla; David Grieco
- Produced by: Marina Alessandra Marzotto; Alice Buttafava; Vincent Brançon; Dominique Desforges; Lionel Guedj
- Starring: Massimo Ranieri; Libero De Rienzo; Matteo Taranto; François-Xavier Demaison
- Cinematography: Fabio Zamarion
- Edited by: Francesco Bilotti
- Music by: Roger Waters
- Distributed by: Microcinema
- Release date: 24 March 2016
- Running time: 115 minutes
- Country: Italy
- Language: Italian

La macchinazione (The Plot) is a 2016 Italian biographical drama film directed by David Grieco, starring Massimo Ranieri and based on the last hours of Pier Paolo Pasolini's life before his murder.

Ranieri, who portrays Pasolini, met the poet when he was young and Pasolini himself was very surprised by the physical similarity between the two of them.

== Plot ==
In the summer of 1975, the writer and film director Pier Paolo Pasolini is completing his latest film Salò, or the 120 Days of Sodom, and has started writing a political essay, Petrolio (Oil). Meanwhile, he begins a dalliance with the young Giuseppe 'Pino' Pelosi, a rent boy with a criminal record. According to the film, the youngster and his accomplices steal some reels of Pasolini's latest film, which they offer to return in exchange for a large ransom. This is a trap, which leads to the director's brutal murder on 2 November 1975.

== Cast ==
- Massimo Ranieri as Pier Paolo Pasolini
- Milena Vukotic as Susanna Colussi, Pasolini's mother
- Libero De Rienzo as Antonio Pinna
- Roberto Citran as Giorgio Steimetz
- Alessandro Sardelli as Giuseppe Pelosi
- Paolo Bonacelli as the Bishop

== Awards and nominations ==
Nastro d'Argento Awards (2016)

- Nomination for Nastro d'Argento for Best Supporting Actress to Milena Vukotic
- Nomination for Nastro d'Argento for Best Cinematography to Fabio Zamarion
