= David Grieco =

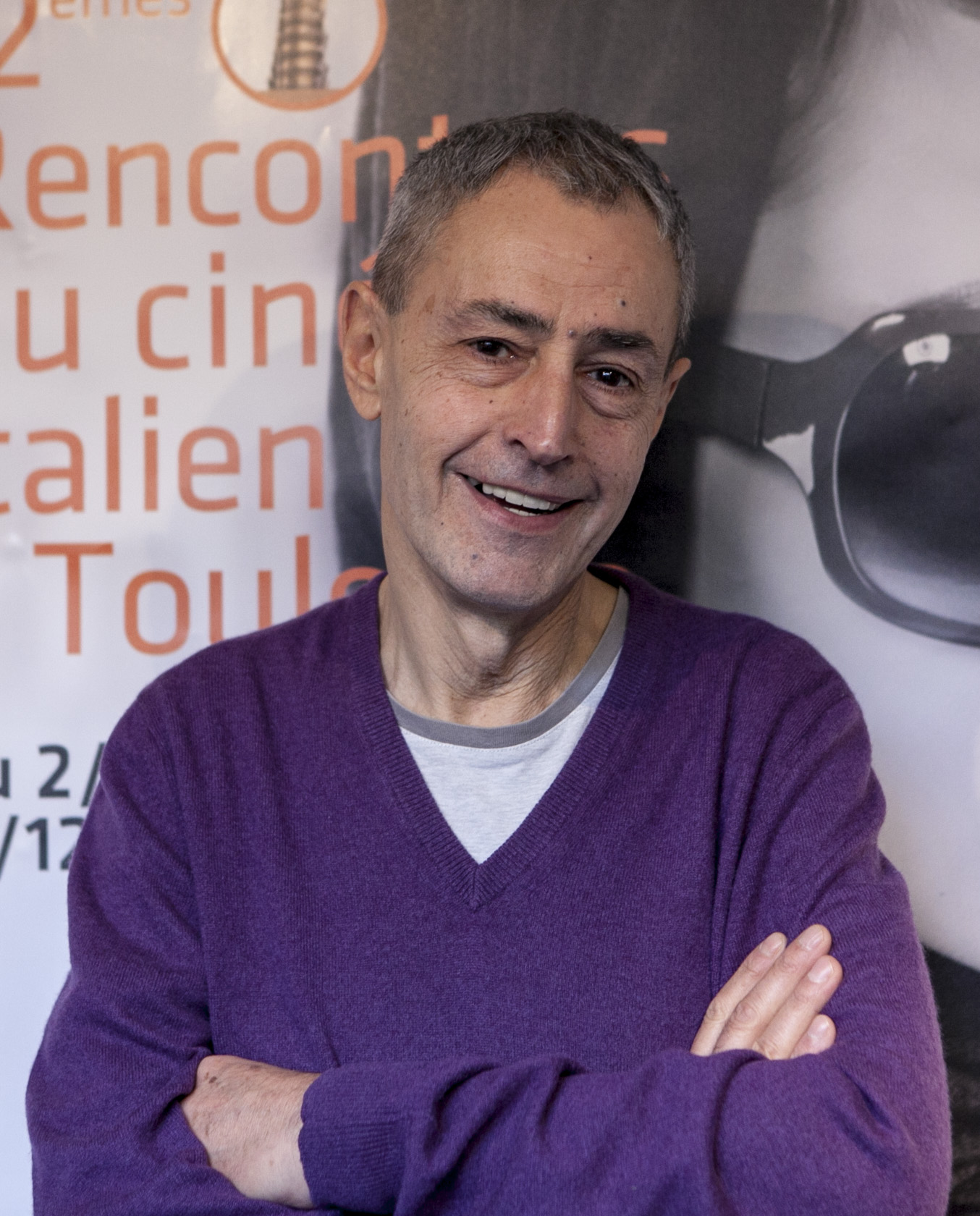
- Grieco in 2016
- Born: 19 September 1951 (age 74); Rome, Italy
- Occupations: Film director; Screenwriter
- Years active: 1968–present

David Grieco (born 19 September 1951) is an Italian director, screenwriter and former actor.

== Biography ==
Grandson of Ruggero Grieco, one of the founders of the Italian Communist Party, Grieco began his movie career as an actor and worked with directors such as Franco Zeffirelli and his two mentors Pier Paolo Pasolini and Bernardo Bertolucci. Pasolini, who wanted Grieco as his assistant director, has been the most important source of inspiration for Grieco.

At the age of 19, he abandoned his acting career and became a film critic for l'Unità.

During his 30s, he started directing documentaries and TV commercials. In 2004 he directed his first feature film Evilenko, starring Malcolm McDowell, while his last film is the 2016 movie La macchinazione, starring Massimo Ranieri as Pier Paolo Pasolini.

== Filmography ==
=== Director ===
- Evilenko (2004)
- La macchinazione (2016)

=== Screenwriter ===
- Caruso Pascoski di padre polacco (1988, directed by Francesco Nuti)
- Mortacci (1989, directed by Sergio Citti)
- We Free Kings (1996, directed by Sergio Citti)

=== Actor ===
- Romeo and Juliet (1968, directed by Franco Zeffirelli)
- Teorema (1968, directed by Pier Paolo Pasolini)
- Partner (1968, directed by Bernardo Bertolucci)
- Hell Ride (2008, directed by Larry Bishop)

== Awards ==
=== David di Donatello ===
- 2005: David di Donatello for Best New Director nomination for Evilenko

=== Nastro d'Argento ===
- 1997: Nastro d'Argento for Best Screenplay nomination for We Free Kings
- 2005: Nastro d'Argento for Best New Director nomination for Evilenko
