= Giuseppe Nirta (born 1940) =

Italian mobster (1940–2023)

- Born: 19 October 1940; San Luca, Calabria, Italy
- Died: 23 February 2023 (aged 82)
- Occupation: Mafia boss
- Status: Deceased
- Allegiance: Strangio 'ndrina
- Criminal charges: Multiple murders
- Penalty: Life imprisonment

Giuseppe Nirta (19 October 1940 – 23 February 2023) was an Italian mobster from San Luca, Calabria who was the boss of the 'Ndrangheta, and the head of the Nirta clan.

The Nirta clan is allied with the Strangio clan in a vendetta against the Pelle-Vottari-Romeo families known as the so-called San Luca feud. The bloody feud between the clans began in February 1991 during a carnival celebration in San Luca when anger over an egg-throwing incident boiled over and culminated in the killing of two members of the Strangio-Nirta clan and the wounding of two others.

The feud re-exploded after a seven-year lull at Christmas 2006 when gunmen ambushed the Nirta's son Giovanni Luca Nirta. He escaped unharmed but his wife Maria Strangio – a cousin of Giovanni Strangio – was killed. Giuseppe Nirta is accused of murdering Bruno Pizzata, a member of the Pelle-Vottari clan, on 4 January 2007.

The vendetta attracted international attention on 15 August 2007, when six men belonging to the Pelle-Romeo clan were shot dead in their cars in front of a pizzeria near Duisburg train station in western Germany.

Nirta was one of Italy's 100 most wanted criminals and arrested on 23 May 2008. He was hiding in a bunker in San Luca. On 12 July 2011, the Criminal Court in Locri sentenced Nirta to life imprisonment for the Duisburg killings.

Nirta died of heart disease on 23 February 2023, at the age of 82.
