= Gregorio Bellocco =

Italian criminal (born 1956)

- Born: 1956 (age 69–70); Rosarno, Italy
- Organization: Bellocco 'ndrina
- Known for: 'Ndrangheta boss
- Relatives: Umberto Bellocco (cousin), Giuseppe Bellocco (cousin)
- Status: Incarcerated
- Penalty: Life imprisonment
- Capture status: Captured

Gregorio Bellocco (Italian pronunciation: [ɡreˈɡɔːrjo belˈlɔkko]; born 1956 in Rosarno) is an Italian criminal and a member of the 'Ndrangheta, a mafia-type organisation in Calabria. He is the boss of the Bellocco 'ndrina from Rosarno in Calabria. He was a fugitive and included in the list of most wanted fugitives in Italy from 1996 until his capture in February 2005.

The Bellocco clan is one of the most powerful groups in the 'Ndrangheta. Activities ranged from drug trafficking, extortion, and the control of nearly all commercial businesses in the Gioia Tauro plain. Jointly with the Pesce clan and in collaboration with the Piromalli-Molè 'ndrina, they controlled the public contracts for the construction of the container terminal in the port of Gioia Tauro.

He succeeded his cousin Umberto Bellocco – arrested in 1993 – as the acting boss of the clan until he was arrested in a pre-dawn raid on 16 February 2005, while hiding in an underground bunker. A Carabinieri official said police had been hunting Bellocco for a long time. “He ruled from his territory, moving from tunnels and bunkers,” he said. He has to serve time on several convictions, including a life sentence for murder. He was succeeded by his cousin Giuseppe Bellocco.
