= Libero De Rienzo =

Italian actor, director and screenwriter (1977–2021)

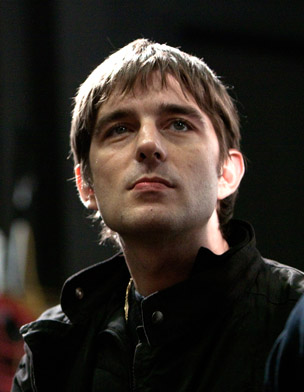
- De Rienzo in March 2009
- Born: 24 February 1977; Naples, Italy
- Died: 15 July 2021 (aged 44); Rome, Italy
- Occupations: Actor; film director; screenwriter
- Years active: 1999–2021

Libero De Rienzo (24 February 1977 – 15 July 2021) was an Italian film actor, director and screenwriter.

== Career ==
De Rienzo was born in Naples and raised in Rome. In 2001, De Rienzo appeared in three films: Fat Girl, Gioco con la morte, and Santa Maradona. He received a David di Donatello for Best Supporting Actor for his work in Santa Maradona. In 2004, De Rienzo starred in A/R andata+ritorno. As of 2005 Blood, Death Does Not Exist has been released, a film which De Rienzo acted in, wrote, and directed. Blood, Death Does Not Exist won the Best Feature and the Grand Chameleon Awards at the Brooklyn Film Festival in 2006.

De Rienzo acted in television productions, including the miniseries Nassiryia – Per non Dimenticare; My House in Umbria; and Aldo Moro – Il Presidente. He also appeared in the 2009 film Fortapasc. De Rienzo died at his home in Rome on the evening of 15 July 2021 from a heart attack. He was 44. The Procura of Roma has opened file and investigation into death as result of another crime. An autopsy was ordered for suspected drug use. On 30 September 2021, it was confirmed that De Rienzo died of an accidental drug overdose.

== Filmography ==
=== Film ===
Year	Title	Role	Notes
1999	Midsummer Night's Dance	Angelo	
1999	Asini	Young priest	
2001	Fat Girl	Fernando	
2001	Holy Maradona	Bartolomeo "Bart" Vanzetti	David di Donatello for Best Supporting Actor
2002	Gioco con la morte	Mattia	
2004	Roundtrip	Dante Cruciani	
2005	Blood, Death Does Not Exist	Adrian	Brooklyn Film Festival – Best Feature; Brooklyn Film Festival – Grand Chameleon
2007	Milano-Palermo: The Return	Libero Proietti	
2009	Fort Apache Napoli	Giancarlo Siani	Nominated – David di Donatello for Best Actor
2011	Kryptonite!	Salvatore	
2013	Miele	Salvatore	
2014	I Can Quit Whenever I Want	Bartolomeo Bonelli	Nominated – David di Donatello for Best Supporting Actor
2015	I Killed Napoléon	Biagio	
2016	La macchinazione	Antonio Pinna	
2017	I Can Quit Whenever I Want: Masterclass	Bartolomeo Bonelli	
2017	I Can Quit Whenever I Want: Ad Honorem	Bartolomeo Bonelli	
2017	Easy	Filo	
2018	Reckless	Inspector Bartolomeo Vanzetti	
2019	The Two Popes	Roberto	
2021	With or Without You	Luca	Posthumous release (final film role)

=== Television ===
Year	Title	Role	Notes
2003	My House in Umbria	Dr. Innocenti	Television film
2007	Nassiryia – Per non dimenticare	Appuntato Maurizio Costa	Television film
2008	Aldo Moro – Il presidente	Valerio Morucci	Television film
