= Umberto Di Fazio =

Member of the Sicilian mafia

Umberto Di Fazio (born 2 November 1962) is a Sicilian mafioso and a high-ranking member of the Catania Mafia family. By the early 2000s, he was considered one of the most influential mafia figures in Catania, managing extortion revenues and public contract rackets on behalf of the organization. Di Fazio was on the list of most wanted fugitives in Italy from 2000 until his arrest in 2005.

== History ==
Born in Catania, Di Fazio was inducted as a man of honour in his early twenties and rose through the ranks of Cosa Nostra, becoming a key member by 1999. He maintained this position until February 2001, when he narrowly survived an assassination attempt reportedly linked to internal disputes over the management of collective extortion funds. Following this event, he went into hiding and remained a fugitive for five years.

During his time on the run, Di Fazio was listed among the most wanted fugitives in Italy and was subject to international search efforts coordinated through the Special Research Program of Italy’s inter-agency task force. Despite these efforts, he remained hidden in Sicily, often sheltered by relatives.

He was eventually captured by the Carabinieri with assistance from Italy’s military intelligence agency (SISMI) in a rural area near Agira, in the province of Enna. At the time of his arrest, Di Fazio was unarmed and staying at a family-owned property. Alongside him, three associates were arrested on charges of aiding and abetting.

At the time of his capture, Di Fazio faced multiple criminal charges, including mafia association, extortion, and murder. He had already been sentenced to life imprisonment in a second-instance trial for the murder of Marsegno Celano, though the verdict was still under appeal in the Court of Cassation. His name also appeared in a message from Cosa Nostra boss Bernardo Provenzano, indicating that rival factions had sought permission to eliminate him over conflicts regarding public contract management in Catania.

Despite a temporary decline in influence during his fugitive years, intercepted communications suggested that Di Fazio was regaining prominence within the Mafia, with support from the Ercolano family. His arrest was hailed by Italian authorities as a significant blow to organized crime, recognizing him as a highly dangerous fugitive and a central figure in the Catanese mafia structure.
