= Michele Antonio Varano =

- Born: 13 July 1951 (age 74); Centrache, Calabria, Italy
- Known for: Alleged cigarette smuggling
- Allegiance: 'Ndrangheta

Michele Antonio Varano (Italian pronunciation: [miˈkɛːle anˈtɔːnjo vaˈraːno]; born 13 July 1951) is an Italian criminal accused of being a member of the 'Ndrangheta, a Mafia-type organisation in Calabria.

From 2000, he was on the Italian "most wanted list" for membership of a criminal organization. Varano has been accused (but not convicted) of tobacco smuggling and other crimes. The Italian authorities tried unsuccessfully over many years to have him extradited from other countries, but he eventually gave himself up to the authorities at Genoa in 2014.

He is currently serving a prison sentence for identity card offences, while investigators consider bringing other charges.

== Cigarette smuggling allegations ==
Varano was arrested on 12 May 2009, in Gandria, Switzerland. According to a statement by the Swiss office of the Federal Prosecutor in 2008, he was among ten people accused of laundering more than US$1 billion made by cigarette-smuggling operations between the early 1990s and 2001.

As reported by Italian judicial investigators, Varano's organisation had illegally transported cigarettes between Italy and Montenegro using speedboats, with the Montenegrin authorities collecting money on special licences and transit fees. According to the Italian prosecutors, this organisation had enjoyed the protection of the Montenegrin prime minister Milo Đukanović. Officials in Montenegro denied any wrongdoing.

The contraband cigarettes were stored in Montenegro before being smuggled into Italy to be sold on the black market in Naples and Apulia. Italians bought more than two billion packets of such cigarettes over more than ten years, and much of the proceeds was channelled into Swiss bank accounts by financial couriers.

== Convicted of carrying a false identity card ==
Varano was tried before the Swiss Federal Criminal Court in Bellinzona, and in July 2009 he was acquitted on the charges of money laundering and cigarette smuggling through the so-called "Montenegro connection". However, in May 2010 he was sentenced in absentia to a year in prison for carrying a false identity card. He surrendered to the police on 2 December 2014 in Genoa.
