= Koa Bosco =

Italian football club

ASD Koa Bosco
- Full name: ASD Koa Bosco
- Founded: 2013
- Ground: San Ferdinando, Bosco Di Rosarno, Italy
- Chairman: Don Meduri Roberto
| Home colours | Away colours |

ASD Koa Bosco is an amateur football club based in Rosarno, Italy.

== History ==
The club was founded in 2013 and it's formed from African immigrants.

In May 2015, the club won its promotion to Seconda Categoria, the 8th level in Italian football system.

== Current squad ==
Note: Flags indicate national team as defined under FIFA eligibility rules; some limited exceptions apply. Players may hold more than one non-FIFA nationality.

| No. | Pos. | Nation | Player |
|---|---|---|---|
| - | GK | | Gregoire Quedraogo |
| - | GK | | Thiam Serigne |

| No. | Pos. | Nation | Player |
|---|---|---|---|
| - | MF | | Abraham Mensah |
