= Polverino clan =

Criminal organization

- Founded: 1990s
- Founded by: Giuseppe Polverino (Peppe 'o barone)
- Founding location: Marano di Napoli, Italy
- Years active: 1990s-present
- Territory: Various districts of Naples in Campania. Strong presence in several cities of Spain and Morocco
- Criminal activities: Drug trafficking, money laundering, racket, bribery, arms trafficking
- Allies: Nuvoletta clan Orlando clan Mallardo clan Lubrano-Ligato clan Licciardi clan Cosa Nostra

The Polverino clan is a Neapolitan Camorra clan operating in the town of Marano di Napoli. The clan is present also in Villaricca, Quarto, Pozzuoli, Qualiano and in the district Camaldoli of Naples (place of origin of the Polverino family). Outside Italy, the clan has a strong presence in Spain, in particular in Barcelona, Málaga and Alicante. According to the investigations, the Polverinos are considered the successors of the Nuvoletta clan.

== History ==
The organization was founded by Giuseppe Polverino, known as "Peppe 'o barone" in the 1990s. The clan started as a ramification of the Nuvoletta clan, but has become independent and one of the most powerful groups of the Camorra over the time, surpassing the Nuvolettas that in 90s were going through a very difficult time, thanks to the large efforts of the Italian police to overthrow the organization. Taking advantage of these years, Giuseppe had to start building his own clan, managing to bring to him, emerging members of the Camorra from Marano such as the Simioli and Ruggiero families.

Giuseppe Polverino, was dubbed the 'hashish king', due to his monopoly on the importation of hashish from Morocco to Italy via Spain supplying not only all the Camorra clans, but also the 'Ndrangheta, the Sicilian Mafia and the Sacra Corona Unita. The Polverino clan had a monopoly of the hashish trade since 1992 until 2009. According to one of the pentitos of the clan, Domenico Verde, the hashish was cultivated in the region of Ketama, and arrived by mules in the beginning, but later was modernized and accessible on trucks and cars.

According to the authorities in Spain, the Polverino clan is the most powerful Camorra clan acting in the country, due to the number of people they have installed and because of the potential of their structure. Among the cities with great influence of the organization are: Alicante, Tarragona, Málaga and Cádiz.

The clan is known to have a good relationship with the Cosa Nostra families from Palermo.

Giuseppe Polverino's personal fortune is over 1 billion euros. Polverino has a great entrepreneurial capacity, investing in the tourism-hotel sector in Italy and Spain, one of the top money launderers of the clan was Luigi Esposito, that according to reports, was able to quadruple the money of the organization. Esposito, who for a long time was a trusted member of the Nuvoletta clan, started working for the Polverino clan, and was arrested in September 2019.

Giuseppe Polverino was arrested on 6 March 2012 in an apartment in Jerez de la Frontera, Spain and extradited to Italy after two months. After his arrest, Giuseppe Simioli, his right-hand man, had taken the reins of the organization, but was also arrested in July 2017 for mafia association, drugs and arms trafficking.

== Leadership ==
- 1990-2012 — Giuseppe Polverino, known as Peppe 'o barone.
- 2012-2017 — Giuseppe Simioli, known as 'O Petruocelo.
- 2017–present — Vincenzo Polverino.

== Present day ==
In 2019, relatives of top members belonging to the clan claim three million euros to the Spanish State of compensation after their relatives were acquitted by the National Court of the crime of money laundering for which they were arrested in 2013 and tried in 2016. Among the assets seized were six yachts, two Ferrari Testarossa, one Lamborghini, one Harley-Davidson, bank accounts and real estate. The plaintiffs are all relatives of the late Giuseppe Felaco, who was allegedly an important member of the Polverino clan based in the Canary Islands, they assure that this Spanish police operation against their family has been a great economic damage, apart from a moral damage.

On 29 May 2019 Raffaele Vallefuoco, an important member of the organization, was arrested in the Rabat region in Morocco. Vallefuoco is considered one of the biggest drug traffickers in Italy and was included on the list of the 50 most wanted fugitives.

Also in 2019, the Italian police with the cooperation of the Spanish police, arrested two members of the clan, who belonged to a major transnational organizational structure, created by the Polverinos, based in Valencia and Naples, that between 2001 and 2012 imported hashish from Morocco via Spain to arrive in the Campania region.

On 6 December 2019, Silvano Pennino and Nicola Di Nuzzo, two important drug traffickers working for the clan in Spain, were released from jail. According to the investigations, Pennino and Di Nuzzo were specialized particularly in the hashish trafficking.

On 11 December 2019, Giuseppe Polverino and Giuseppe Simioli were sentenced to life imprisonment. They were held responsible for the murder of Giuseppe Candela, which happened in July 2009. According to the investigations, Candela, who was a member of the Polverino clan, was killed because he was managing his business independently, and no longer responding to the clan.

On 26 May 2020, 16 people belonging to the clan were arrested in an investigation by the DDA (Direzione Distrettuale Antimafia), including the alleged current leader of the clan, Vincenzo Polverino.

On 5 June 2020, the Direzione Distrettuale Antimafia seized €10 million of assets from the clan. Among the seized assets were two villas, two garages, two warehouse-depots, six commercial premises, three plots of land, a school building and a nursery.

== See also ==
- Camorra
- List of members of the Camorra
- Nuvoletta clan
- List of Camorra clans
- Marano di Napoli
