= Giovanni Bonomo =

Member of the Sicilian Mafia

- Born: Giovanni Bonomo; July 10, 1935; Partinico, Sicily, Italy
- Disappeared: 2010
- Predecessor: Vito Vitale (as capo mandamento of Partinico)
- Allegiance: Sicilian Mafia
- Conviction: Mafia association
- Criminal charges: Murder, drug trafficking, money laundering, Mafia association
- Penalty: 6 years
- Capture status: Arrested
- Wanted by: Italian Ministry of the Interior
- Wanted since: 1996
- Time at large: 7 years (1996-2003)

Details
- Victims: 2
- Date: 1994
- Country: Italy
- State: Sicily
- Killed: 2
- Date apprehended: November 2003
- Imprisoned at: Italy

Giovanni Bonomo (Italian pronunciation: [dʒoˈvanni boˈnɔːmo]; 10 July 1935 – 2010) was a member of the Sicilian Mafia. He was on the "most wanted list" of the Italian ministry of the Interior from 1996 for two murders, drug trafficking and money laundering, and Mafia association, until his arrest in Senegal in November 2003.

== Mafia boss in Partinico ==
Bonomo was born in Partinico in Sicily. He succeeded Vito Vitale as the capo mandamento of Partinico after the latter’s arrest in April 1998. He was considered to be the strategical and financial brain of the Mafia clan, and was in close contact with Giovanni Brusca and Leoluca Bagarella of the Corleonesi.

He has been charged with the murder of two men in Partinico in 1994 who defied the rule of the Mafia clan in that town; one of them because he committed robberies in the area without the consent of the Mafia. In 2001, he was sentenced to 6 years for Mafia association.

He acquired substantial wealth, investing in real estate in the center of Palermo, bank shares and the family winery. Assets worth 45 billion lire (23 million euro) were confiscated in 2001.

== Fugitive ==
Bonomo had been at large since 1996. According to police sources Bonomo had been living in Namibia and South Africa, where he had been in close contact with another of Italy's most wanted Mafia criminals, Vito Roberto Palazzolo, who has spent long periods in South Africa and who remains at large.

In 1996 the Italian anti-Mafia police came to South Africa with arrest warrants for Giovanni Bonomo and another Mafia man, Giuseppe Gelardi. The wanted mafiosi were allegedly staying on Palazzolo's Franschhoek estate La Terra de Luc. The estate was raided by members of the South African organised crime unit on 6 June 1996, but Bonomo and Gelardi were not found, although investigators found evidence that whoever had been staying there had left in a hurry.

In November 2003 he was arrested in Dakar in Senegal, coming from the Ivory Coast. He showed fake documents, but was identified by fingerprints. He was expelled to Italy where he was arrested and incarcerated. Bonomo died in 2010, before the sentence became definitive.
