= Easy (2017 film) =

2017 comedy-drama film

- Directed by: Andrea Magnani
- Screenplay by: Andrea Magnani
- Starring: Nicola Nocella; Libero De Rienzo
- Cinematography: Dmitriy Nedria
- Edited by: Luigi Mearelli
- Music by: Luca Ciut
- Release date: 2017
- Language: Italian

Easy (Italian: Easy - Un viaggio facile facile, Ukrainian: «Ізі», romanized: Izi) is a 2017 comedy-drama film written and directed by Andrea Magnani, in his feature film debut.

A co-production between Italy and Ukraine, it premiered at the 70th Locarno Film Festival. The film received two David di Donatello nominations, for best actor (Nicola Nocella) and best directorial debut.

== Cast ==
- Nicola Nocella as Easy
- Libero De Rienzo as Filo
- Barbara Bouchet as Delia
- Ostap Stupka as Bogdan
- Veronika Shostak as Julia
- Katheryna Kosensko as Selina
- Lorenzo Acquaviva as Funeral Home Owner
