= Gaetano Santaiti =

Giuseppe Gaetano Santaiti (Italian pronunciation: [dʒuˈzɛppe ɡaeˈtaːno santaˈiːti]; 17 March 1967 in Seminara), is a boss of the 'Ndrangheta, a Mafia-type criminal organisation based in Calabria, Italy. Santaiti was the acknowledged head of the area of Seminara, located about 30 km northeast of Reggio Calabria, together with the Gioffrè clan.

The clan expanded to northern Italy, notably Liguria and Lombardy, as well as to Turkey, where links were established with Kurdish rebel groups for the purpose of drug trafficking.

Wanted since 1993 for mafia association, drug trafficking, extortion and possession of arms, he was included in the list of most wanted fugitives in Italy. He had been sentenced to 24 years of imprisonment. Santaiti was arrested in Seminara on 20 May 2001.

He decided to become a government witness (pentito) in 2003, and his testimony resulted in the arrest of some 30 people. In July 2010, the protection as a government witness was revoked after his arrest for "false statements in his defense".
