= Camaldoli hill =

Highest point in the city of Naples, Italy

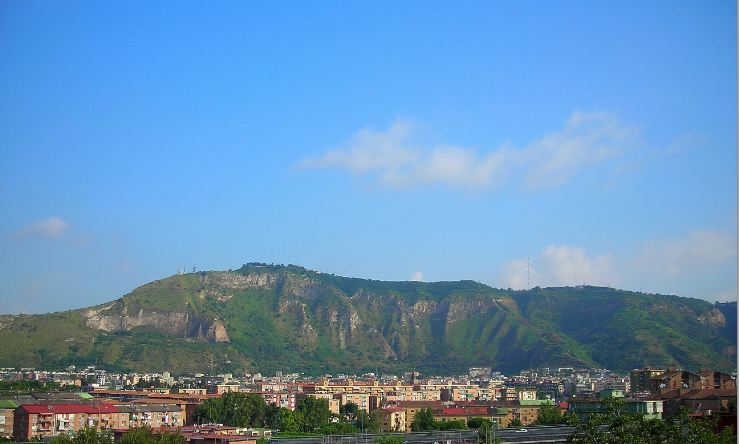
The Camaldoli hill seen from the Fuorigrotta district

The Camaldoli hill (Italian: Collina dei Camaldoli) is the highest point in the city of Naples, with a maximum altitude of 457 meters above sea level. It extends between the municipality of Naples and the municipalities of Marano di Napoli and Quarto.

== Description ==
The two sides of the hill are characterized by substantial differences: the southern side is characterized by steep cliffs made up of tufa rocks; the northern slope is slightly sloping and is covered by a thick coppice.

From the top on the side facing the Soccavo district, one can enjoy a splendid and broad view over a large part of Campania, which embraces the gulfs of Naples, Pozzuoli and Gaeta, Vesuvius, the Sorrento peninsula, the long ridge of Cape Posillipo which extends at sea with the island of Nisida, up to Mount Circeo, the Roccamonfina massif, the archipelago of the Pontine islands, the Matese plateau and behind the Camaldoli hill, we find the town of Marano di Napoli. On the highest point of the hill, the building of the Eremo dei Camaldoli was founded in 1585 and currently houses the Brigidine nuns.

== Climate ==
The climate is generally mild of the Tyrrhenian sub-littoral type, but there are also considerable cold episodes in the winter months (in February 1929, the temperature dropped to −7.0 °C). In any case, due to altitude, the area 350 m above sea level has temperatures on average about 3–4 degrees lower than those of the lower areas of the city. Today the hill is a destination for snow enthusiasts in Naples: in fact, they often go there to witness a snowy downpour, especially at altitudes of 250 m and higher. The main snowfalls in recent years have been those of 5 February 2003, the period 26–29 January, 16 February and 1 March 2005 and 18 February 2009.

== Flora ==
In the Camaldoli forest and on part of the hill, broom, St. Joseph's lily, buttercup, cyclamen, periwinkle, and chestnut, among others, may be found.
