= Giuseppe Bellocco =

Italian criminal (born 1948)

- Mugshot of Bellocco
- Born: 22 February 1948; Rosarno, Italy
- Allegiance: 'Ndrangheta

Giuseppe Bellocco (Italian pronunciation: [dʒuˈzɛppe belˈlɔkko]; born 22 February 1948) is an Italian criminal and a member of the 'Ndrangheta. He is the capobastone of the Bellocco 'ndrina from Rosarno in Calabria. He was a fugitive from 1997 and included in the list of most wanted fugitives in Italy until his capture in July 2007.

The Bellocco clan is one of the most powerful groups in the 'Ndrangheta. Activities ranged from drug trafficking, extortion and the control of nearly all commercial businesses in the Gioia Tauro plain. Jointly with the Pesce clan and in collaboration with the Piromalli-Molè 'ndrina they controlled the public contracts for the construction of the container terminal in the port of Gioia Tauro.

Bellocco’s criminal career goes back to 1974 when he was arrested for extortion and theft. He headed the clan after the arrest of his cousin Gregorio Bellocco in February 2005.

He was arrested in the company of his wife on 16 July 2007, in an underground bunker concealed below a manger in a farmhouse near Rosarno. He was presiding over a meeting of the 'Ndrangheta. Special police units, supported by three helicopters, surrounded the farmhouse, knowing that Bellocco was inside. When they broke into the building, they found eight others and no sign of their main target. A two-hour search eventually led to the discovery of Bellocco's hideout.
