= Giovanni Strangio =

Italian criminal (born 1979)

- Born: January 3, 1979 (age 47); Siderno, Calabria, Italy
- Organization: 'Ndrangheta
- Known for: San Luca feud
- Penalty: Life imprisonment
- Capture status: Arrested

Details
- Date apprehended: March 12, 2009

Giovanni Strangio (Italian pronunciation: [dʒoˈvanni stranˈdʒiːo]; born January 3, 1979) is a member of the 'Ndrangheta born in Siderno, Calabria. In 2007, his name appeared on the list of most wanted fugitives in Italy as well as in Germany, Strangio was arrested in Amsterdam on March 12, 2009.

== San Luca feud ==
Strangio was wanted for the Duisburg massacre on August 15, 2007, which made headlines worldwide. He was one of two gunmen that killed six Italian men in front of the Da Bruno restaurant near the main railway station. More than 70 shots were fired. The carnage was part of a long-standing feud between two 'Ndrangheta clans from San Luca in Calabria, the Pelle-Vottari-Romeo and Strangio-Nirta clan.

He reportedly belongs to the Strangio-Nirta clan and is a relative of Maria Strangio, the wife of Giovanni Luca Nirta, who was killed on December 25, 2006 in an attempt to kill her husband. The killing revived the lingering San Luca feud that started in 1991. Strangio was arrested at the funeral of Maria Strangio where he appeared with a gun, presumably to kill members of the Pelle-Romeo clan. He was apprehended after a short exchange of fire in which he was slightly wounded. He was arrested and released in July 2007.

== Duisburg massacre ==
Strangio returned to Germany, where he ran "Tonis Pizza" in Kaarst in North Rhine-Westphalia. From his adopted hometown, Strangio allegedly prepared the attack against the rival clan that included Marco Marmo (1982–2007), among its members, and the chief suspect in the murder of Maria Strangio, who was killed in the bloodbath. Strangio quickly became a suspect. His apartment in Kaarst was searched and it appeared that he had left it in a hurry, leaving a large amount of money behind.

On December 18, 2007, four suspects in the Duisburg massacre were arrested, but Giovanni Strangio remained a fugitive until his arrest in March 2009. The second gunman is believed to be Strangio’s brother-in-law Giuseppe Nirta, also wanted for international cocaine trafficking, who was arrested on May 23, 2008.

Strangio is not to be confused with his namesake Giovanni Strangio, the owner of the Da Bruno restaurant, who, despite his family name, in fact belongs to the rival Pelle-Vottari-Romeo clan. He was arrested on August 30, 2007 in San Luca. His brother Sebastiano Strangio was one of the victims of the massacre in Duisburg.

== Arrest and trial ==
Strangio was arrested on March 12, 2009 in Diemen, a suburb of Amsterdam where he was living with his wife and son. His brother-in-law, Giuseppe Nirta, was arrested as well. On May 13, 2009, a Dutch court ruled that he was to be extradited to Italy, not Germany. Italy sought to prosecute him not only for the 2007 Duisburg killings, but also for membership of a criminal organization. The Duisburg killings had been the result of clashes between rival clans in the Italian town of San Luca, "Therefore the relation with Italy is bigger than the relation with Duisburg where the crime took place," according to a judge in Amsterdam.

The trial against the clans started on April 14, 2010 in Locri. Strangio followed the hearing via video link from his prison cell in Rome. On July 12, 2011, the Corte d'Assise of Locri sentenced Strangio to life imprisonment for the Duisburg killings.
