= Giancarlo Siani =

Italian journalist (1959–1985)

Giancarlo Siani (Italian pronunciation: [dʒaŋˈkarlo siˈaːni]; Naples, September 19, 1959, - Naples, September 23, 1985) was an Italian crime reporter from Naples, who was killed by the Camorra, the Neapolitan mafia. He started to write in the magazine Osservatorio sulla camorra, and later as a stringer for Il Mattino, the principal newspaper of Naples. He was assigned to the local area editor of Castellammare di Stabia. He wrote articles about the links between organized crime, politicians and construction contracts.

== Death ==
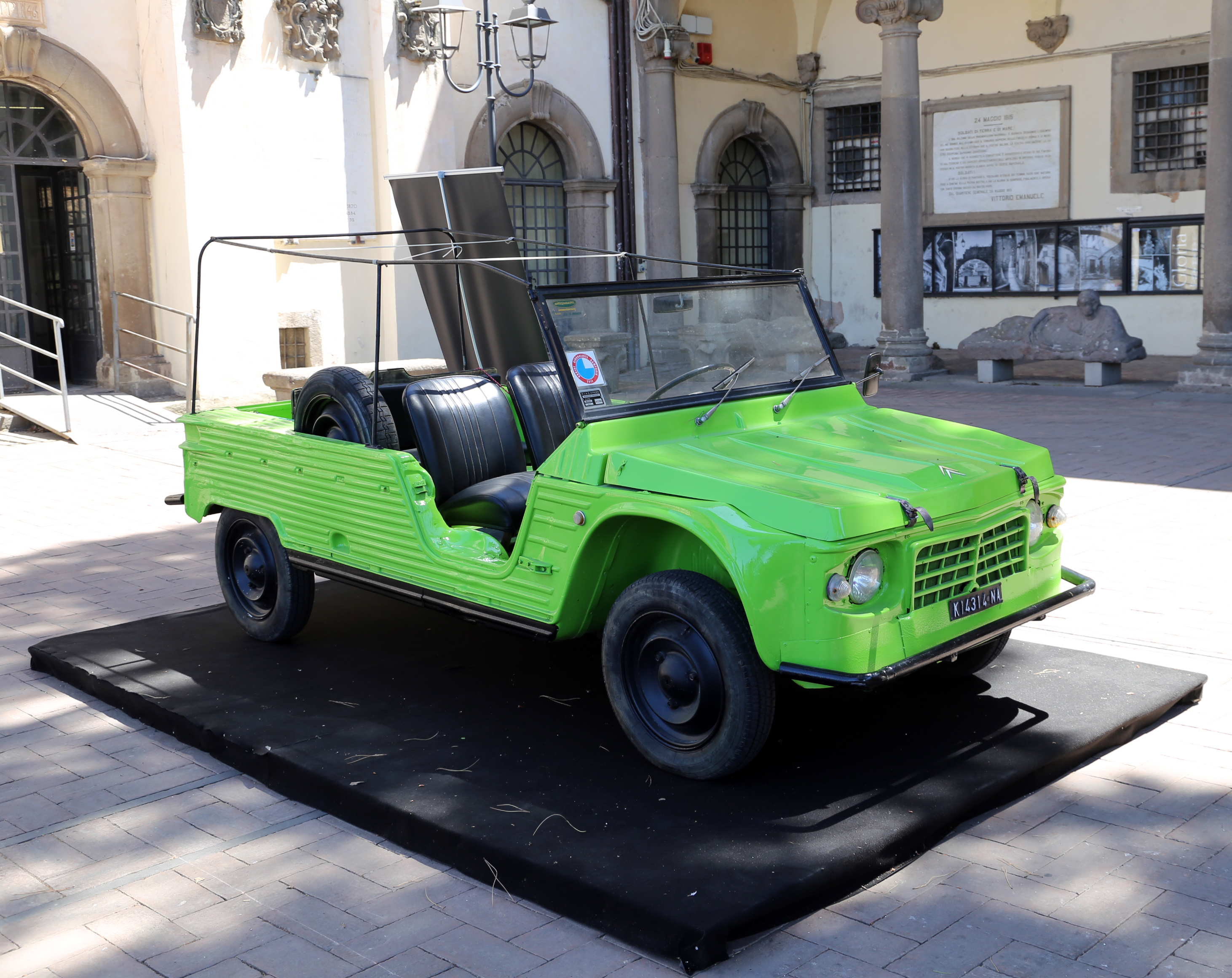
Original car where Siani was killed on September 23rd 1985

Siani was executed in his soft top Citroën Méhari on September 23, 1985, in Naples by the Camorra, while approaching his apartment. He was killed by an assassination squad of at least 2 men who approached from behind and shot him 10 times in the head with 7.65mm small arms fire with at least 2 Beretta pistols. The killers escaped on a motorcycle. At the time he was conducting an investigation of one of their leaders, Valentino Gionta. Gionta was the boss of the Gionta clan, a Camorra clan that was based in Torre Annunziata and controlled cigarette smuggling.

On June 10, 1985, 3 months before his murder, Siani had revealed that Valentino Gionta's arrest had been decided by Lorenzo Nuvoletta, head of the Nuvoletta clan, (an ally Camorra clan) to arrive in peace with Alfieri-Bardellino. Siani was preparing a dossier on the Torre Annunziata massacre in August 1984, which left eight people killed and 24 wounded among the Gionta clan, allied with the Nuvolettas at the time. After the massacre tensions between the two clans had increased.

In 2000, Angelo Nuvoletta, Valentino Gionta and Luigi Baccante were sentenced in absentia to life in prison for ordering the murder, as well as the material killers Gaetano Iacolare, Ferdinando Cataldo, Armando Del Core and Ciro Cappuccio.

In 2009, the movie Fortapàsc based on his life story was released, directed by Marco Risi. The title (pronounced "Fort-apash" in dialect) is a reference to John Ford's classic western, Fort Apache, and the lawlessness of Camorra-ruled Naples.

== See also ==
- List of journalists killed in Europe
