= Vito Roberto Palazzolo =

Italian businessman

- Vito Roberto Palazzolo
- Born: 31 July 1947 (age 79); Terrasini, Italy
- Other name: Robert von Palace Kolbatschenko
- Status: Incarcerated under the Article 41-bis prison regime
- Allegiance: Sicilian Mafia
- Criminal charge: Mafia association
- Penalty: Nine years' imprisonment (2009)

Vito Roberto Palazzolo (Italian pronunciation: [ˈviːto roˈbɛrto palatˈtsɔːlo]; born 31 July 1947) is an Italian businessman previously living in South Africa. Born in Terrasini, he moved to South Africa in the mid-1980s. He also goes by the name Robert von Palace Kolbatschenko. He is alleged to be a member of the Sicilian Mafia, an allegation he denies. In March 2009, the highest court in Italy confirmed a 2006 nine-year sentence for association with the Mafia. He is alleged to be a Mafia treasurer linked to Bernardo Provenzano, the Mafia boss arrested in April 2006 in Corleone, Sicily, and his predecessor Salvatore Riina, both serving life sentences in Italian jails. Palazzolo maintains his innocence and claims that he has been persecuted by the Italian government, the press, lawyers, politicians, and "opportunists" for many years. On 30 March 2012 Palazzolo was arrested by Interpol at Suvarnabhumi Airport in Bangkok, Thailand.

== Money laundering accusations ==
Palazzolo was born in Terrasini, Sicily (Italy). He left home in 1962 at the age of 15 and emigrated to Switzerland. He completed his studies in Switzerland and Germany and started working as a private banker, servicing high-net-worth individuals, and made substantial amounts of money in the diamond trade. In 1982, he founded Consultfin SA with Franco Della Torre, a financial services arm of one of three major Swiss banks in Lugano, Switzerland. The company became a conduit for financial operations of heroin traffickers linked to the Mafia.

Palazzolo first came to the attention of law enforcement in Italy and the United States in the course of money laundering activities in the Pizza Connection heroin trafficking ring between Turkey, Sicily and New York. Italian and US intelligence officers estimate that Palazzolo was involved in a network that laundered more than US$1.6 billion in drug money through Switzerland. Some of the money was moved by Palazzolo through offshore companies and fronts from 1979 until his arrest in Lugano (Switzerland) on 20 April 1984, on an international arrest warrant from Italy.

The Swiss Criminal Court in Lugano sentenced Palazzolo in September 1985 to a three-year prison term for money laundering, after establishing he was in control of some of the accounts where money raised from the heroin sales were deposited. The Court established that Palazzolo and his partner Franco Della Torre moved 6 million dollars in 1982, half of which was converted into 200 kg. of gold for Mafia boss Antonio Rotolo, who seriously threatened Palazzolo to return him the money when the latter was warned that the FBI was investigating the suspicious money transfers. Palazzolo "participated in the financing of the illegal trafficking of narcotics and served as intermediaries in its financing, making the necessary preparations and contributing in this way to dealing in considerable quantities of morphine base, which were shipped by sea from Turkey to Southern Italy, where it was processed into heroin, and from there sent to the USA for sale to consumers."

The appeal court increased the sentence to five-and-a-half years in April 1986. In 1993, the Bundesgericht in Bern reduced the sentence to three years and nine months, for having acted in "dolus eventualis", which is a legal interpretation of reckless disregard, somewhere between intent and negligence.

In Italy, he was charged for the same offences in the procedures against the Italian end of the Pizza Connection. An arrest warrant was issued in April 1984 by prosecuting magistrate Giovanni Falcone requesting Palazzolo's extradition. The extradition was refused because he was already on trial before the Swiss courts. In March 1992, a criminal court in Rome convicted Palazzolo for the crime of "association with the purpose of financing for narcotics trafficking" and sentenced him to two years. He was acquitted on the charge of Mafia association, however, because the fact "did not exist". The conviction was suspended because Palazzolo had already served three years in prison in Switzerland for the same facts.

At the time, the United States Federal Bureau of Investigation (FBI) considered him to be one of the top seven in the Sicilian Cosa Nostra. However, he is never mentioned as a member of the top echelon of Cosa Nostra in court sentences and academic studies. State witness Antonino Giuffrè claimed that the Sicilian Mafia's interests in the drug trade in Venezuela, Brazil, Mexico, Canada and the Far East were managed by Palazzolo. Giuffrè's claim could not be substantiated.

== Escape to South Africa ==
While on 36-hour parole from a prison in Switzerland, he absconded to South Africa on a false passport – obtained from a fellow inmate at a prison in Lugano, Switzerland – and a holiday visa in December 1986. Palazzolo travelled to the Eastern Cape, where National Party parliamentarian Peet de Pontes for East London had organised Ciskei residence for him. Palazzolo acquired Ciskei citizenship and a new name: Robert von Palace Kolbatschenko, claiming aristocratic German lineage, born in Burgersdorp. On the strength of a new passport in this name, he obtained resident status in South Africa – but all files relating to the application are missing.

The former Ciskei ambassador plenipotentiary, Douw Steyn, told the Harms Commission which investigated the so-called "Palazzolo affair" that Ciskei law had been specially amended to accommodate Palazzolo on condition he donate money to the homeland.

After inviting a Home Affairs official to his farm at Franschhoek, Palazzolo was granted a South African residence permit in December 1987. By January 1988, Swiss police had traced him and informed their South African counterparts. The South African Narcotics Bureau (Sanab) raided Palazzolo's Franschhoek farm, Terra de Luc, and arrested him – seizing 10 guns and diamonds worth 500,000 Rand together with documents indicating that Palazzolo had invested more than 25 million Rand in businesses in South Africa and Namibia. He was declared an undesirable person in South Africa and returned to Switzerland to complete his jail sentence.

After being released from jail, Palazzolo returned to South Africa in late 1989 to testify against De Pontes, who was convicted in November 1990 for helping Palazzolo obtain South African residence. De Pontes was fined R35,000 after being convicted of charges including fraud, forgery, and bribery, all linked to Palazzolo's stay in South Africa. After testifying about his own fraudulent residence application, Palazzolo stayed in South Africa until late 1991, when he was ordered out of the country by the Department of Home Affairs.

De Pontes maintained he was wrongly convicted – saying former minister of foreign affairs Pik Botha threatened in 1988 to "destroy him" after a photograph of Palazzolo and Botha together at an NP function was published in a newspaper. De Pontes said among the deals he and Palazzolo worked on was a 1987 sanctions-busting attempt to import submarines and jet fighters for the apartheid regime.

== Political contacts ==
In 1992, Palazzolo was reportedly living in a residence in Ciskei belonging to then-military ruler Oupa Gqozo, but he was soon back in South Africa. The Cabinet, headed by president Frederik Willem de Klerk, approved a new South African residence application in March 1993, although at the time Palazzolo was the subject of an Italian extradition warrant, according to the magazine Africa Confidential. In September 1993, De Klerk's government issued a passport to Palazzolo.

According to some sources, Palazzolo allegedly blackmailed former foreign minister Pik Botha with photographs showing Botha in a compromising position in bed with a black woman. The photographs are said to be in the possession of the National Intelligence Agency (NIA). Botha has said the claim was "absolute rubbish" and threatened a R10 million lawsuit against the Mail & Guardian.

== Business interests ==
Palazzolo quickly ingratiated himself with the National Party when he arrived in South Africa in 1986 and also successfully wooed many in the African National Congress (ANC) long before Mandela's party won the 1994 election, which definitively ended the Apartheid regime. Palazzolo established businesses in Southern Africa, ranging from bottled water to diamond prospecting. His interests are represented either through his sons Christian and Pietro or through the Von Palace Kolbatschenko Trust. The trust, with offices in Cape Town, is affiliated to Palazzolo's Cape International Holdings, registered in the British Virgin Islands.

Among the approximately 20 companies allegedly linked to him are Anglo-Cape Diamonds, Von Palace Cutting Works and La Vie Mineral Waters. One big foreign deal involved taking a 15% stake in a valuable Angolan diamond concession. Since a tax audit on him started in September 1997, he has argued that his only business enterprise in South Africa is the Franschhoek farm and that he has no other tax liabilities in the country.

== South Africa ==
Investigations into Palazzolo restarted in 1995 when police in the Cape received inquiries from Italian police, who were after Mariano Tullio Troia, a Sicilian mafioso wanted for the murder of Salvatore Lima, an associate of former Italian prime minister Giulio Andreotti. A March 1998 briefing compiled by Western Cape police intelligence said Italian police claimed Troia was being harboured by Sicilian Salvatore Morettino, a naturalised South African citizen living in Houghton. The Italian police also gave information of contact between Palazzolo and a prominent Sicilian mafia boss, Giovanni Brusca, convicted in Italy for the murder of Antimafia prosecutor Giovanni Falcone.

The document alleged that Palazzolo was believed to head a Mafia "family" in South Africa. Apart from Troia, Mafia suspects Giovanni Bonomo and Giuseppe Gelardi were given refuge by Palazzolo in South Africa and Namibia after they escaped arrest in Italy. Italian police travelled to South Africa, where they confirmed the presence of a number of mafia suspects and "the existence of a well-knit network of corrupted South African officials that protect the Italian fugitives".

== More judicial inquiries ==
In November 1999, Palazzolo was arrested in connection with fraud and forgery charges relating to his South African citizenship. Home affairs officials discovered that it was issued fraudulently. He was released on a 500,000 rand bail, but re-arrested at his Bantry Bay home in Cape Town in March 2000. In March 2003, he was acquitted of contravening South African law when applying for citizenship in 1994. The judge criticised the Directorate of Public Prosecutions for wasting the court's time with cases they could never win.

Investigators also probed Palazzolo's alleged role in money laundering through Liechtenstein companies and trusts and requested legal assistance from authorities. An international cooperation granted by the regional court in Vaduz in March 2000 has been ruled invalid. Following an agreement between lawyers for the state and Palazzolo, the Cape High Court ordered that the state "shall forthwith withdraw the requests for mutual legal assistance to Liechtenstein and Switzerland respectively and also any similar requests made to any other countries since 1999".

This means investigators cannot access documents, computer data and other information obtained from four companies and trusts based in Liechtenstein or Switzerland. The material was seized and sealed after the Vaduz court approved the cooperation request, stating that "for the period from 1986 to present, the South African investigation authorities have managed to trace approximately 90 transactions to a total of approximately R101,5-million". The Vaduz court decision filed in the Cape High Court said there was a "shrewd scheme" to conceal money flows of millions of dollars into the control of Palazzolo. Reference was made to various offshore accounts, including suspected "Cosa Nostra accounts" and several other companies based outside South Africa.

Palazzolo took Andre Lincoln, former commander of the Presidential Investigation Task Unit (Pitu), to Angola to clear his name with the Angolan government.

== Convicted in Italy ==
In 2003, prosecutors from Palermo, Sicily, attempted to have Palazzolo extradited to face charges of Mafia association. Tapes revealed Palazzolo urging his sister Sara to put pressure on Marcello Dell'Utri to derail attempts to extradite him to South Africa, and offering to cut Dell'Utri in on construction deals in Angola. "Don't worry, you don't have to convert him, he's already been converted", Palazzolo said about Dell’Utri – implying that Dell'Utri was a member of the Mafia. Not long afterwards, in April 2004, the extradition request was shelved.

On 5 July 2006, Palazzolo was sentenced in Palermo to nine years in prison for external collusion with the Mafia. Because he had been acquitted in 1992 for Mafia association and in concordance with the ne bis in idem principle (the double jeopardy clause in common law jurisdictions), he could not be judged for the same crime twice. Italy asked for Palazzolo to be extradited but the South African justice department said it would only begin processing the extradition request once his appeal against that conviction was finalised. On 11 July 2007, the Court of Appeal in Palermo changed the conviction from external collusion into Mafia association while maintaining the nine-year-prison sentence. The Court of Appeal argued that new evidence by a range of pentiti since the original acquittal for Mafia association in 1992 justified the aggravating conviction.

The court of last resort in Italy, the Supreme Court of Cassation, confirmed the nine-year sentence for Mafia association in March 2009. According to several pentiti (collaborating state witnesses) such as Francesco Di Carlo, Salvatore Cancemi, Giovanni Brusca and Antonino Giuffrè, Palazzolo is a member of Cosa Nostra made in the Mafia family of Partinico. His lawyers denounced the Italian Government at the European Court of Human Rights for the violations that have been committed with regards to Palazzolo. On 16 December 2010, the Court in Caltannisseta accepted a review of the nine-year conviction requested by the lawyers of Palazzolo claiming double jeopardy.

== Palazzolo's denials ==
Palazzolo has always denied that he is involved in organised crime, has any links to the Mafia, nor enjoys close relations with politicians in the government. In 1992, a court in Rome had found him not guilty of being a member of the Mafia. "I was acquitted of Mafia charges, but I am always the 'alleged Mafia don' and it is disturbing to be portrayed that way to family and friends," Palazzolo maintains. He hired a public relations adviser, Aldo Sarullo, a former actor, playwright and director, who advised Palermo's Antimafia mayor, Leoluca Orlando, and later Silvio Berlusconi's party Forza Italia, to change his image as a Mafia boss.

In an interview with the Italian news agency ANSA in July 2009 he denied that he was the so-called treasurer for former Cosa Nostra bosses Riina and Provenzano. He said that "for me it is a great dishonour to be considered the treasurer of Riina and Provenzano, two of the biggest criminals Italy has known. It is shameful to be accused of managing the wealth of these two men, whom I have never met. Perhaps others are proud of being associated with them, like state's witnesses, but not me." He challenged "the Italian police or any police, even the secret service, to produce one single transaction I am alleged to have carried out on behalf of Provenzano or Riina." Palazzolo claims he had been "persecuted" by Italian magistrates based on testimony given by crime figures who had turned state's witnesses.

== Extradition denied ==
In January 2007 the Italian government requested the extradition of Palazzolo after the nine-year sentence was handed down by the Italian court for collusion with the Mafia. This was the sixth request from the Italians since 1992. In June 2010, the High Court of South Africa blocked the extradition of Palazzolo due to lack of double criminality requirement as South Africa does not recognize the crime of Mafia association as conceived in Italy. Moreover, the Court also found double jeopardy as Palazzolo had already been acquitted of Mafia association in 1992 by a court in Rome. For the Italian authorities Palazzolo remains a fugitive from justice.

On 30 September 2010, an Interpol red notice – one of Interpol's tools for tracking international fugitives – was issued. The notice said that Palazzolo is "devoted to international drug trafficking" and that he helped other Mafia representatives abscond abroad. Palazzolo's local attorney, Norman Snitcher, reacted with a letter to Interpol asking that the red notice be withdrawn as it did not accurately reflect details about his client.

The same month, September 2010, Palazzolo opened a website and stated that he was being wrongly persecuted by the Italian judicial authorities. On the website Palazzolo claims: "I have been accused of many things, from running guns for the apartheid regime ... to administering the Mafia's financial empire (from my home in Franschhoek!) in Venezuela ... and the Far East. The sheer scale of it is comically absurd."

== Arrest in Thailand and extradition ==
At the end of January 2012 Palazzolo moved to Hong Kong with his wife. Italian prosecutors soon requested his arrest but Palazzolo fled to Bangkok, Thailand. Upon his arrival at Suvarnabhumi Airport in Bangkok, Palazzolo was arrested by Interpol on 30 March 2012. Thai police had been tipped off by Sicilian Carabinieri officials who had been monitoring Facebook postings by Palazzolo. On 2 April, Thai police officials met with Italian and South African representatives. Afterward, the Thais said that a criminal cooperation treaty with Italy allowed to surrender Palazzolo to Italian authorities for deportation, despite the absence of an extradition treaty. The South African representatives will not contest the extradition if presented with proof that Palazzolo is the man convicted in Italy.

On 20 December 2012, a Thai Court ordered the extradition of Palazzolo to Italy. His lawyer said that Palazzolo would not appeal, but that he was considering to talk to the Italian prosecutors "to clarify the events linked to the period in which he was a banker in Switzerland. As a witness he could shed light on many mysteries and his relations with institutions and representatives of various Italian institutions."

A year after the decision to extradite him from Thailand and complicated procedures, Palazzolo arrived in Italy. In February 2014, Palazzolo was incarcerated under the Article 41-bis prison regime, usually reserved for dangerous criminals.

Leaked documents revealed in April 2016, known as the Panama Papers, show that Palazzolo used the Panama-based law firm Mossack Fonseca to shield seven tax-haven companies in the British Virgin Islands from Italian, South African and Namibian authorities, as well as his business connection with Namibian businessman Zacharias Nujoma, the youngest son of former President Sam Nujoma of Namibia.
