= Bellocco 'ndrina =

- Founded: 1960s
- Founder: Umberto Bellocco
- Founding location: Rosarno, Calabria, Italy
- Years active: 1960s-present
- Territory: Rosarno and San Ferdinando in Calabria; Varese in Lombardy
- Ethnicity: Calabrians
- Criminal activities: Drug trafficking, money laundering, arms trafficking, extortion, corruption, murder
- Allies: Piromalli 'ndrina Mancuso 'ndrina Pesce 'ndrina Camorra; Capriati clan Parisi-Palermiti clan

The Bellocco 'ndrina is a clan of the 'Ndrangheta, a criminal and mafia-type organisation in Calabria, Italy. The 'ndrina is based in Rosarno, on the Tyrrhenian coast, and belongs to the locale of that town, particularly very active in drugs trafficking, arms trafficking, extortion and control of commercial and entrepreneurial activities.

The pentito Antonino Belnome affirms that regarding the supply of drugs through the Port of Gioia Tauro, it was necessary to refer to the Mancusos, the Pesce or the Bellocco. The last took 30% of the goods in transit or in cash or drugs.

== Powerful 'Ndrangheta clan ==
The Bellocco clan is one of the most powerful clans in the 'Ndrangheta. Activities range from drug trafficking, extortion and the control of nearly all commercial businesses in the Gioia Tauro plain. Jointly with the Pesce clan and in collaboration with the Piromalli-Molè 'ndrina they controlled the public contracts for the construction of the container terminal in the port of Gioia Tauro.

After the construction of the port, the Piromalli-Mole and Pesce-Bellocco clans controlled activities tied to the port, the hiring of workers, and relations with port unions and local institutions, according to a report of the Italian Antimafia Commission. They who would guarantee peace and order on the docks in return for a ‘security tax’ of US$1.50 per for each transshipped container.

The clan also has a strong presence in northern Italy, in particular in Varese (Lombardy), where they controlled drug trafficking.

== Leadership ==
The head of the clan is Umberto Bellocco (1937–2022), arrested in February 1993. Umberto or his brother Carmelo Bellocco became a member of La Provincia, a provincial commission of the 'Ndrangheta, formed at the end of the Second 'Ndrangheta war in September 1991 to avoid further internal conflicts.

In the beginning of the 1980s Umberto Bellocco was involved in setting up the Sacra Corona Unita (SCU), a mafia-type organization in Apulia, to counter the growing influence of the Camorra. On his instigation Giuseppe Rogoli imported the codes, structure and initiation rites of the 'Ndrangheta to be used by the SCU.

After his arrest in 1993, he was succeeded as acting boss by his cousin Gregorio Bellocco, arrested in February 2005, and Giuseppe Bellocco, arrested in July 2007.

== Recent developments ==
In January 2006, 54 members of the Bellocco-Pesce clan were arrested in an operation against international drug trafficking. They were supplying the drug markets in Milan, Como, Sondrio, Brescia, Bergamo, Treviso, Alessandria, Naples and Reggio Calabria. The cocaine was imported from Colombia, Brazil, Spain and the Netherlands, heroin from the Balkans and ecstasy from the Netherlands.

On January 12, 2010, the Italian police arrested 17 people in Bologna and Calabria linked to the Pesce-Bellocco clan. They were expanding their drug and arms trafficking activities to Bologna, where Carmelo Bellocco was serving a 17-year sentence for racketeering. Bellocco is accused of leading the group's activities while on day-leave from prison.

In 2020, the Italian police dismantled a cocaine trafficking scheme used by the Camorra D'Alessandro clan, who with the support of the Bellocco and Pesce 'ndrine, were able to supply the entire region of Castellammare di Stabia with drugs.
