= Rosarno =

- Comune
- Comune di Rosarno
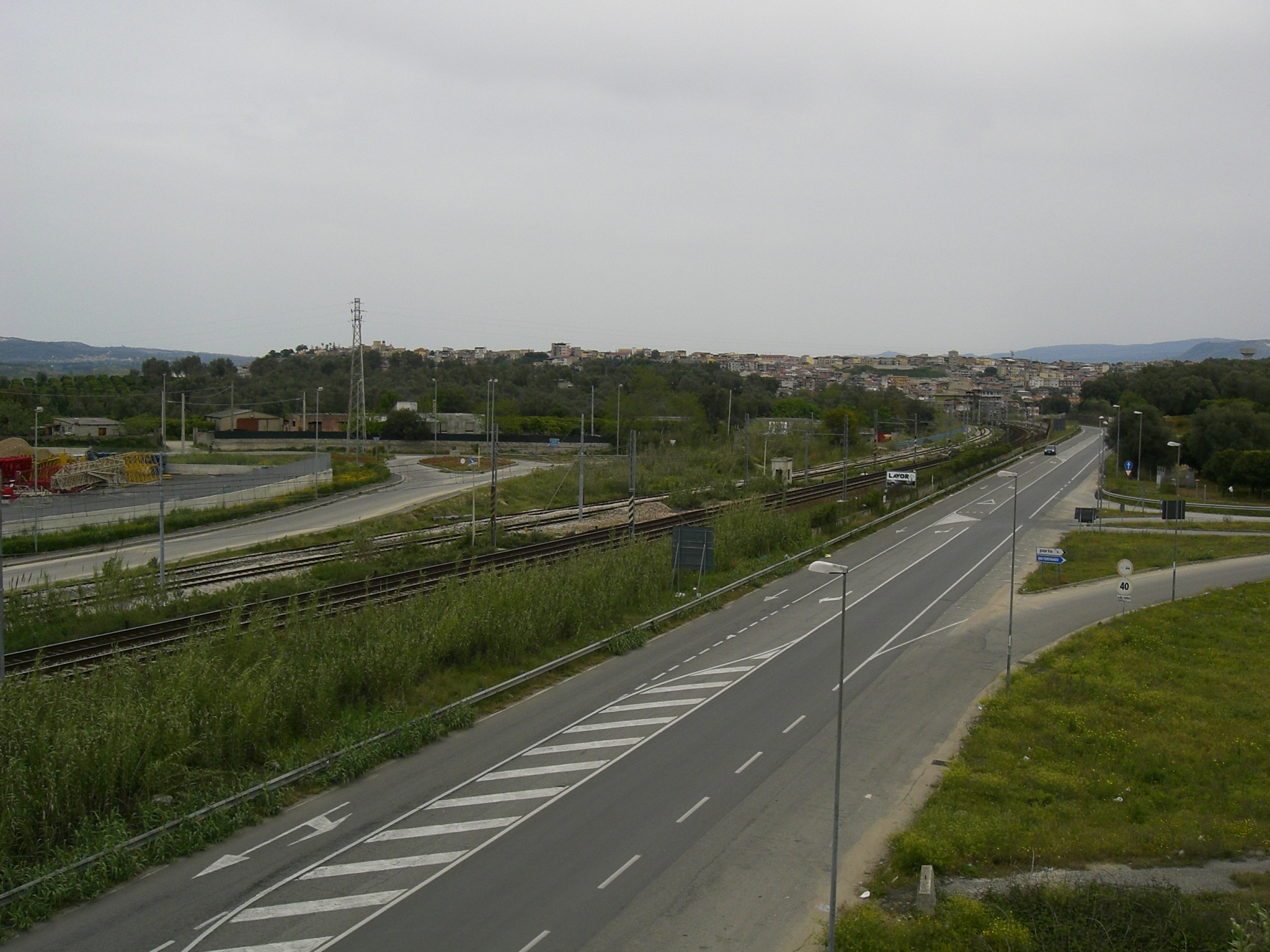
- View of Rosarno

- Coat of arms

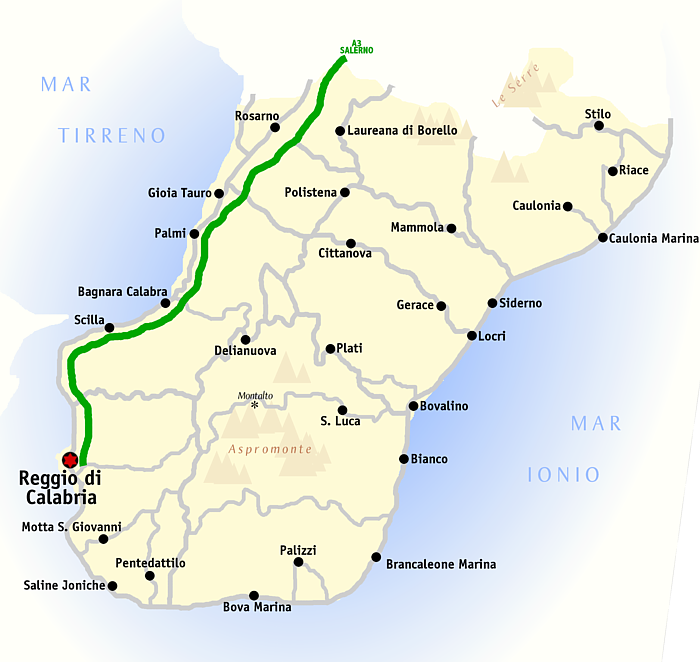
- Map of the province of Reggio Calabria, with Rosarno located to the north between the coast and the A2 motorway (A2 depicted in green)

- Location within Italy Location within Calabria
- Coordinates: 38°30′N 15°59′E
- Country: Italy
- Region: Calabria
- Metropolitan city: Reggio Calabria (RC)
- Frazioni: Bosco, Crofala, Scattarreggia, Testa dell'Acqua, Zimbario

Government
  - Mayor: Pasquale Cutrì

Area
  - Total: 39.5 km^{2} (15.3 sq mi)
- Elevation: 60 m (200 ft)

Population (31 December 2015)
  - Total: 14,841
  - Density: 376/km^{2} (973/sq mi)
- Demonym: Rosarnesi (also Rosarnisi)
- Time zone: UTC+1 (CET)
  - Summer (DST): UTC+2 (CEST)
- Postal code: 89025
- Dialing code: 0966
- Patron saint: St. John the Baptist
- Saint day: Nativity of St. John the Baptist
- Website: Official website

Rosarno is a comune (municipality) in the Metropolitan City of Reggio Calabria in the Italian region of Calabria. It is about 70 kilometres (43 mi) southwest of Catanzaro and about 50 kilometres (31 mi) northeast of Reggio Calabria. Rosarno stands on a natural terrace cloaked in olive plantations and vineyards on the left bank of the river Mesima, overlooking the Gioia Tauro plain. The town is an important agricultural and commercial centre known for the production of citrus fruits, olive oil, and wines.

== History ==
Within the borders of Rosarno is the site of the ancient city of Medma. Present day Rosarno appeared during the Byzantine Era, mentioned for the first time in a document in 1037. Ownership of Rosarno was greatly contested, due to its strategic importance in giving a hold over of the fertile Mesima valley and was controlled by various feudal lords, including the Ruffo and the Pignatelli families.

An earthquake in 1783 completely destroyed the town. In the plain surrounding Rosarno, the tremors caused huge landslides which blocked the course of rivers; the resulting marshes led to a malaria epidemic that killed more people than the earthquake itself. The town was quickly rebuilt and became a borough in 1816. The town plan is typified by large squares and straight, wide streets that cross each other perpendicularly. The remains of the old feudal castle are preserved, along with a 16th-century coastal tower, the clock tower, the church of St. John the Baptist, the small church of the Crucifix, and various noblemen's homes, many of which have magnificent marble doorways from the last century.

== Climate ==
Climate data for Rosarno Centro Funzionale Multirischi (1981-2010)
Month	Jan	Feb	Mar	Apr	May	Jun	Jul	Aug	Sep	Oct	Nov	Dec	Year
Mean daily maximum °C (°F)	17.0 (62.6)	17.3 (63.1)	19.7 (67.5)	22.3 (72.1)	26.2 (79.2)	30.3 (86.5)	33.8 (92.8)	34.6 (94.3)	30.7 (87.3)	27.1 (80.8)	22.4 (72.3)	19.4 (66.9)	25.1 (77.1)
Mean daily minimum °C (°F)	8.4 (47.1)	8.1 (46.6)	9.1 (48.4)	11.9 (53.4)	15.2 (59.4)	19.9 (67.8)	22.8 (73.0)	23.4 (74.1)	21.5 (70.7)	17.3 (63.1)	13.2 (55.8)	10.0 (50.0)	15.1 (59.1)
Source: blog di Record piano source (Ispra)

== Economy ==
Rosarno is largely agricultural, with citrus and olive groves and juice and candied peel factories. Much of the work is done by illegal immigrants from Africa and Eastern Europe, who gather every morning in the main street in the hope of being picked for a day job. In 2006 it was estimated that about 5,000 illegal immigrants lived in the Rosarno region. Many live in squalid conditions in abandoned factories with no running water. Médecins sans Frontières runs free clinics for undocumented migrants in Rosarno and other parts of Calabria. For a 12-hour work day they get paid € 20 and have to pay € 5 for transport to the fields.

=== Tensions between migrants and locals ===
The level of immigration has led to tensions between local inhabitants and the immigrants. In December 2008, a gunman entered a dilapidated factory where over a hundred farm workers were sleeping and shot two of them, seriously injuring a 21-year-old migrant from Côte d'Ivoire. The migrant workers took to the streets peacefully, marching through Rosarno to deliver a request to the prefectoral commissioner at the town hall for more humane treatment.

In January 2010, after an attack on immigrant farm workers by local youths, rioting broke out. Youths in a car used air rifles to shoot and hurt several immigrants returning from working on the farms. The migrants clashed with police after taking to the streets. Cars were burned and shop windows smashed. Some 2,000 immigrants, most of them from Ghana and Burkina Faso, demonstrated in front of the town hall shouting "We are not animals" and carried signs saying "Italians here are racist". Several of the protesters were arrested and locals and immigrants were injured in clashes between the two groups and riot police.

After the attacks, the Italian interior minister, Roberto Maroni, a member of the anti-immigrant Northern League party, said the tensions were a result of "too much tolerance towards clandestine immigration".

Father Carmelo Ascone, the parish priest of Rosarno, said the situation of the immigrants reminded him of the circles of hell in Dante's Divine Comedy: "These people live in inhuman and desperate conditions." A spokesman for the International Organization for Migration called the unrest "among the worst of its kind in recent Italian history."

Any black person who is hiding in Rosarno should get out. If we catch you, we will kill you.

— Message broadcast from a van during a town hall march on Friday January 8th, 2010, according to CNN.

After two days of violence the number of injured stood at 53, comprising 18 police, 14 local people and 21 immigrants, eight of whom were in hospital. Attacks against the migrant workers included setting up a roadblock and hunting down stray Africans in the streets of Rosarno. Some of the crop-pickers were shot; others beaten with metal bars or wooden clubs. All African migrant workers were moved out of town by police, while local inhabitants cheered and applauded their departure. They were loaded onto buses destined for immigrant holding centres elsewhere in Calabria, Naples and Bari.

Among the locals arrested for the attacks was Antonio Bellocco, related to members of the feared Bellocco clan, which controls the area in which the fruit farms are situated. He was arrested and received another arrest warrant due to a police operation against the 'Ndrangheta clan on January 12, 2010. The operation was unrelated to the unrest, but the result of an ongoing investigation against the organization.

== Crime ==
Rosarno is a hotbed of the 'Ndrangheta, a Mafia-type criminal organisation based in Calabria. The local 'Ndrangheta dominates the fruit and vegetable businesses in the area, according to Francesco Forgione, a former head of Italy's parliamentary Antimafia Commission. Several powerful criminal clans originate from the town, such as the Bellocco, Pesce and Ascone 'ndrine. In October 2008 the mayor of Rosarno, Carlo Martelli from Berlusconi's Forza Italia party, was arrested for having links to organised crime and of having illegally favoured businesses linked to the Piromalli family, one of the 'Ndrangheta's most powerful clans, from the nearby town of Gioia Tauro. The former mayor was completely cleared of all charges in July 2009 after a year of legal battles with the 466/09 Corte d'Appello di Reggio Calabria decision.

In December 2008, the entire town council was dissolved on orders from the central government and replaced by a prefectoral commissioner because it had been infiltrated by 'Ndrangheta members and their known associates.

== Sports ==
- Koa Bosco

== Sources ==
- Camilla Devitt (2011). The Rosarno Revolt: Toward Political Mobilization for Immigrants?. Italian Politics. Vol. 26. Berghahn. pp. 220–237.
