= Marano di Napoli =

Marano di Napoli Marano 'e Napule (Neapolitan)
- Comune
- Comune di Marano di Napoli
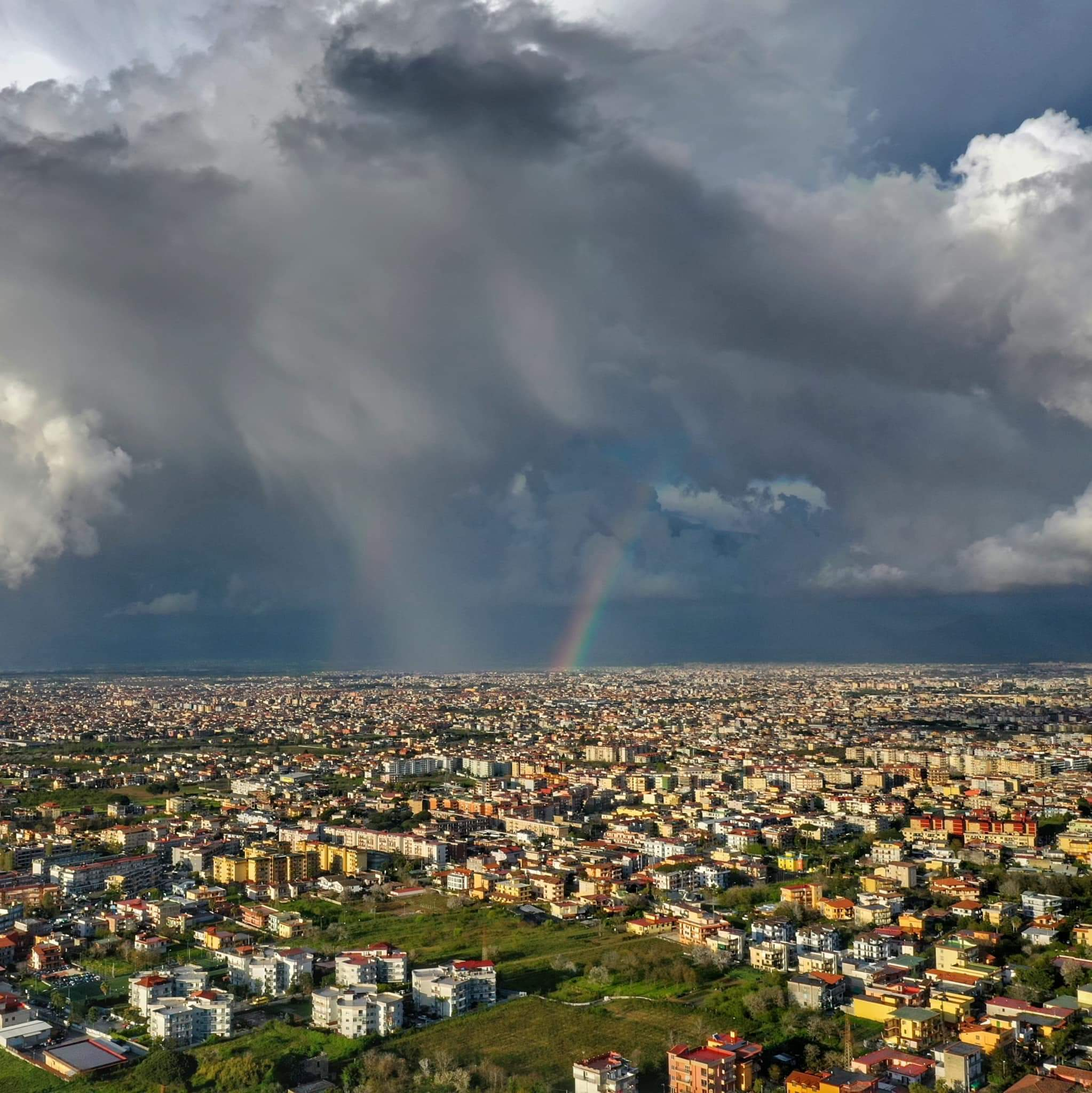
- View of Marano di Napoli

- Coat of arms

- Location within Italy Location within Campania
- Coordinates: 40°54′N 14°11′E
- Country: Italy
- Region: Campania
- Metropolitan city: Naples (NA)
- Frazioni: San Rocco, Castello Monteleone, San Marco, Torre Caracciolo, Torre Piscicelli

Government
  - Mayor: Rodolfo Visconti (PD)

Area
  - Total: 15.64 km^{2} (6.04 sq mi)
- Elevation: 160 m (520 ft)

Population (2026)
  - Total: 57,631
  - Density: 3,685/km^{2} (9,544/sq mi)
- Demonym: Maranesi
- Time zone: UTC+1 (CET)
  - Summer (DST): UTC+2 (CEST)
- Postal code: 80016
- Dialing code: 081
- Patron saint: San Castrese
- Saint day: February 11
- Website: Official website

Marano di Napoli (Italian: [maˈraːno di ˈnaːpoli]; Neapolitan: Marano 'e Napule) is a city and comune (municipality) in the Metropolitan City of Naples in the region of Campania in southern Italy, located about 9 kilometres (6 miles) northwest of Naples. Partly located on the Camaldoli hill, with 57,631 inhabitants, it is one of the most populous municipalities in the metropolitan city.

== History ==
=== Prehistoric and Roman era ===
The Maranese territory shows anthropological traces dating back to the Neolithic age which tells us how this area has been inhabited since ancient ages: in fact settlements dating back approximately 8,000 years ago (along the Marano-San Rocco route) have been found. From the Osco-Samnite period we find traces especially in the area of Masseria Spinosa, Vallesana and Monteleone; however most of them have been destroyed leaving today only three still viable roads, namely Cupa dei Cani, Pendine and Cupa Orlando. With the Roman period we have a real flowering area which has become a crossroads of economic, recreational and religious activities, as it is located along the Via Campana which connected Pozzuoli (an important commercial port in the imperial period) to Capua (connected to Rome with the Appian Way). Evidence from the Roman period are the Mausoleo del Ciaurro (the most important funerary architectural work in Campania) and five statues preserved in the National Archaeological Museum of Naples depicting a freedman named Dama, his wife Terzia (both belonged to Emperor Tiberius), Hercules and two fauns.

=== Development after the Romans ===
Following the fall of the Western Roman Empire, and the loss of power of the Eastern Roman Empire in the region, it become part of the Kingdom of Sicily and then of the Kingdom of Naples. In these centuries the original nucleuses of the city arose: a village called Balisano (or Vallesana), another that was the real is its hamlet of Marano (and therefore identifiable in the historical center) and the hamlet of Turris Marano (or Marano delle Torri) near Monteleone. Just in the area of Monteleone the emperor Frederick II had a castle built as a hunting lodge, which, on his death, was set on fire due to a popular uprising; was rebuilt by King Charles I of Anjou in 1275, which forced sixty families to reside in the vicinity of the same, founding the fraction called San Rocco. With the coming of the Spaniards to Naples, Marano turned into a building site, changing its face. In 1630, in addition to understanding its historic territory, the city included Quarto and the territory of the current Monterusciello. Moreover, up to this date Marano was part of the state-owned farms of Naples; however the governing bodies, due to the financial difficulties of the State, decided to alienate the farmhouse, together with others, to swell the coffers. The farmhouse was therefore sold to Antonio Manriquez, Marquis of Cirella, who was succeeded by his son Diego in 1631. Diego was succeeded by his sister Caterina (in 1637) and his death in 1690, to Eufrasia Serbellone (daughter of Caterina Manriquez). From 1704 Marano passed to the noble Caracciolo.

=== Modern era ===
In 1806, following the administrative reform under the Neapolitan reign of Giuseppe Bonaparte, the feud was abolished to make room for the nascent Maranese municipal administration. Later Marano will follow the fortunes first of the Kingdom of the Two Sicilies and then of Italy. From 1948, the quarter of Quarto achieved independence by forming an autonomous municipality.

== Geography ==
The city covers a hilly area of 15.64 km^{2} (6.04 sq mi) at 151 m (495 ft) above sea level. The area on which it stands is geologically relatively very young as it was formed about 11,000 years ago (corresponding to the third and last geological period of the Phlegraean area). Marano is located north-west of Naples whose borders are on a slope of the Camaldoli hill. Marano is about 8 kilometres (5.0 mi) from the Asse Mediano, and about 10 kilometres (6.2 mi) from the Tangenziale of Naples. The city is just ten kilometers from the international airport of Naples-Capodichino.

== Demographics ==
Historical population
Year	Pop.	±%
1861	5,439	—
1871	5,625	+3.4%
1881	6,661	+18.4%
1901	7,958	+19.5%
1911	9,242	+16.1%
1921	10,510	+13.7%
1931	12,597	+19.9%
1936	13,481	+7.0%
1951	16,634	+23.4%
1961	19,285	+15.9%
1971	30,307	+57.2%
1981	41,571	+37.2%
1991	47,961	+15.4%
2001	57,448	+19.8%
2011	57,204	−0.4%
2021	58,042	+1.5%
Source: ISTAT

As of 2026, the population is 57,631, of which 48.5% are male, and 51.5% are female. Minors make up 17.0% of the population, and seniors make up 19.6%.

=== Immigration ===
As of 2025, immigrants make up 3.5% of the population. The 5 largest foreign countries of birth are Ukraine, Romania, Morocco, Ghana, and Bulgaria.

== Main sights ==
Marano's main attraction is the so-called Mausoleo del Ciaurro, one of the most important Roman funerary edifice in Campania, dating to the 1st-2nd century AD.

Another attraction is Torre Caracciolo which was built by the Aragonese. From its walls you can admire the Gulf of Naples and the Phlegraean Fields but it is currently privately owned.

=== Festivals ===
Each October, since 2000, Marano promotes a widespread festival, which involves youngsters from Campania and other parts of Italy. The festival, called "Marano Ragazzi Spot Festival", extorts people from these contexts to organize several activities, including a short film against the monopoly of Camorra on the territory. The spots are aimed at showing civil commitment and demand for legality. Moreover, the one week long celebration, whose slogan is "Give a Voice", shows a collective effort to fight corruption and degradation and it is led by the good part of the population.

Plenty of au pairs are hosted by local families in order to make more and more people aware of what Naples has to offer. Furthermore, the effects of the festival do not fade in few days, because MRSF Spots are constantly projected on the tube electronic screens, with the purpose of reminding people that Marano is no longer a city of crime, but a promise for the future.

== Economy ==
The main economic sources of the city are agriculture and commerce. Many ancient typical noble arts have been lost during the years, like the handmade construction of stairs and cests. Strangely enough some renowned and typical local agricultural products are not produced anymore. In past years the peas from Marano (Santa Croce) and the cherries (Recca's cherries) were sold all over the Italy. Nowadays only few farmers cultivate these two products.

For many centuries one of the main sources of income for the citizens of Marano has been the selling of tuff stones. The tufo workers, also known as montesi, used to start working at a very early age. Ten workers could extract two thousands stones per day. A jingle was used to beat the time while the montesi were working. The jingle was made of fifty verses, and at the end of the jingle each worker was sure he had extracted exactly fifty stones.
