= Piromalli 'ndrina =

Notorious clan in Italy

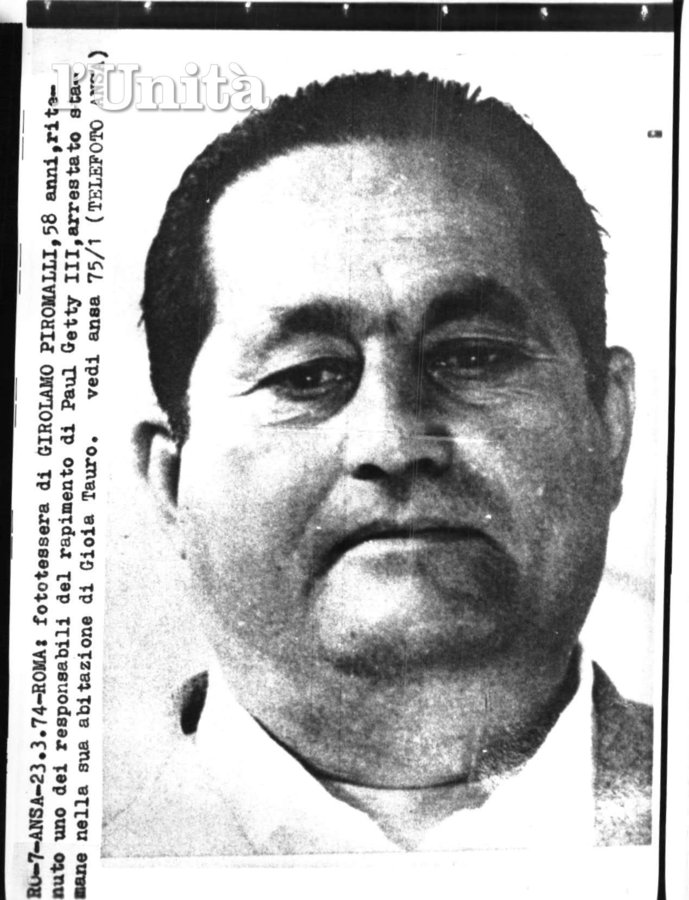
- Mugshot of 'Ndrangheta boss Girolamo Piromalli
- Founded: 1950s
- Founding location: Gioia Tauro, Calabria, Italy
- Years active: 1950s-present
- Ethnicity: Calabrians
- Allies: First 'Ndrangheta war (1974-76): De Stefano 'ndrina
- Rivals: First 'Ndrangheta war (1974-76): Domenico Tripodo, Antonio Macrì

The Piromalli 'ndrina is one of the most powerful clans of the 'Ndrangheta, a criminal and mafia-type organisation in Calabria, Italy. The 'ndrina is based in Gioia Tauro on the Tyrrhenian coast. The Piromalli's are allied with their relatives of the Molè family, also from Gioia Tauro. Often they are referred to as the Piromalli-Molè clan. The Piromalli clan contains more than 200 members.

== Rise to prominence ==
The Piromalli-Molé clan was involved in a bloody feud with the Ventre-Carlino clan in the 1950s, in which Antonino Piromalli, a brother of Girolamo Mommo Piromalli, was killed in 1956. The clan rose to prominence under the rule of the brothers Mommo Piromalli and Giuseppe "Peppe" Piromalli. Together with Antonio Macrì from Siderno on the Ionic coast and Domenico Mico Tripodo, the boss of the city of Reggio Calabria, the elder Piromalli brother Mommo formed a sort of triumvirate since the beginning of the 1960s until the outbreak of the First 'Ndrangheta war in the mid-1970s. Their senior position was recognized by all other family chiefs and their advice was in most cases followed without protest.

When Girolamo Piromalli died of natural causes in 1979, his brother succeeded him as head of the clan. Since the mid-1970s, according to several pentiti, members of the Piromalli family and the Nirta family from San Luca rotated among themselves the position of capo crimine. In Gioia Tauro, blood relatives of the Piromalli long represented the interest of the clan in the city council. Peppe Piromalli was captured on 24 February 1984. At age 83, he died on February 19, 2005, and his nephew Giuseppe "Pino" Piromalli succeeded him.

Giuseppe was a fugitive since 1993 and included in the list of most wanted fugitives in Italy until his capture in March 1999. While in the strict Article 41-bis prison regime he nevertheless keeps on conducting his business and direct the clan outside. The Piromalli clan tried to relax the strict regime for their boss. One of the plots was to deliver votes to Berlusconi’s People of Freedom (Il Popolo della Libertà, PdL) coalition during the election campaign in 2008 in return for a relaxation of Piromalli’s prison stature. Their go-between Aldo Micciché, a businessman who moved to Venezuela after being convicted of fraudulent bankruptcy in Italy, planned to fill in 50,000 blank ballot slips for Italian voters in Latin America obtained from corrupt officials. Micciché asked two leading members of the Piromalli clan to visit Marcello Dell'Utri – Berlusconi's right-hand man – at his Milan office.

== Entrepreneurial mafia ==
The Piromalli family transformed their 'Ndrangheta clan from a rural-based group into an entrepreneurial criminal organization, gaining control over numerous public works projects in the Gioia Tauro area. Their influence was particularly strong in the construction of a massive steelworks complex and its supporting infrastructure on the Gioia Tauro plain, including a rail link and the Gioia Tauro port. These developments were part of the so-called "Colombo package" – named after then Prime Minister Emilio Colombo – introduced to appease the unrest sparked by the 1970 Reggio revolt, which erupted in response to the decision to designate Catanzaro as the official seat of Calabria’s regional administration. When in 1974 businesses involved in the expansion of the port and steelworks in Gioia Tauro offered a three per cent kickback to be left in peace the three leading 'Ndrangheta families at the time, Antonio Macrì, the Piromalli brothers and the De Stefano brothers rejected the offer and wanted to be sub-contracted on work carried in order to control the projects.

The subcontracts for the steelworks in Gioia Tauro, whose total value reached the astronomic amount of US$3.8 billion were largely distributed on the basis of territorial criteria. The 'Ndrangheta clans secured control of all subcontracts, directly managing 70% of them and imposing an 8% kickback on the remainder carried out by non-mafia firms. More than half the contracts were granted to the Piromalli family, which dominated the area where the steelwork was supposed to be built. The managers of the COGITAU consortium, tasked with completing the Gioia Tauro port and the related infrastructure for the steel plant, officially brought Gioacchino Piromalli into the organization as an associate. During the foundation-stone laying ceremony, which marked the start of construction and was attended by former (and future) Prime Minister Giulio Andreotti (at the time Minister of Budget), the company selected Piromalli to serve as the host of the event. The company subsequently did not suffer from extortion or inflicted damage of any kind in an area where the previous year 154 explosive attacks had been committed.

The 'Ndrangheta exploited the construction of the steelworks until the project was abandoned when the government decided there was no economic base for it. Meanwhile, conflicts over business interests arose between Piromalli and the De Stefano clan, contributing to the First 'Ndrangheta War, which lasted from 1974 to 1977 and resulted in 233 deaths. At the end, a hit squad headed by Peppe Piromalli killed the clan's boss Giorgio De Stefano in November 1977, and the Piromalli's gained the upper hand.

== Controlling the Gioia Tauro port ==
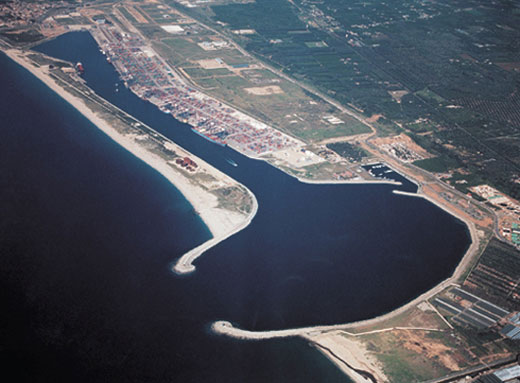
Seaport of Gioia Tauro

The Piromalli clan managed to condition the management of the new container terminal in the port of Gioia Tauro. Established in the mid-1990s, it became the largest terminal in the Mediterranean, moving over 2 million containers in 1998. Since 1994, when Contship Italia rented the port area to start transhipment activity and the Medcenter Container Terminal was set up thanks to 138 billion lire (about US$86 million) in state financing, the Piromalli’s obliged the Medcenter company, through its vice president Walter Lugli, and the Contship company, through its president Enrico Ravano, to pay a kickback of US$1.50 for each transhipped container, a sum which corresponded to about half the net profits earned by the two companies.

Additionally, the Piromalli's desired contracts, subcontracts, and jobs in the two firms that run the port, as well as from other companies in the surrounding area. Despite subscribing to an anti corruption pact with the government, the managers of both Contship and Medcenter gave in to the demands. The arrest warrant issued in January 1999 against members of the Piromalli group stated that the two companies contracted firms indicated by the clan (and in some cases belonging to it) in the port-servicing activities and hired people recommended by the Piromalli clan, reinforcing the clan's power in the Gioia Tauro plain.

In February 2008 the parliamentary Antimafia Commission concluded that the 'Ndrangheta "controls or influences a large part of the economic activity around the port and uses the facility as a base for illegal trafficking." In its report it said that "the entire gamma of internal or sub-contracted activities is mafia-influenced, from the management of distribution and forwarding to customs control and container storage." The extortion of Ravano and Contship, was part of a project that "did not involve simply this security tax, which grew with the port, but also control of activities tied to the port, the hiring of workers, and relations with port unions and local institutions," the report added. "It effectively eliminated legitimate competition from companies not influenced or controlled by the mafia in providing goods and services, performing construction work and hiring personnel. And it threw a shadow over the behaviour of local government and other public bodies."

The port of Gioia Tauro became an important hub in the international cocaine trafficking networks. An investigation in 2025, showed that the cocaine arriving at the port is transported further by the Pesce and Piromalli clans, who control the port area, in exchange for a percentage, which is paid in cocaine rather than money, according to the pentito Domenico Agresta.

== Alliance with Molè 'ndrina ==
The Piromalli’s were allied with their relatives of the Molè family, also from Gioia Tauro. Often they are referred to as the Piromalli-Molè clan. "The Molè family is the military arm of the Piromalli clan," according to Francesco Forgione, chairman of Italian parliament's Antimafia Commission. Control of the Gioia Tauro container hub has allowed the Piromalli clan to dominate not only the illegal drug trade but also arms and other contraband smuggling. Within the Piromalli organization the Molè clan is responsible for cocaine trafficking and handles relations with 'Ndrangheta branches in central and northern Italy as well as with Colombian drug cartels.

A turf war between the two clans surfaced in February 2008 when Rocco Molè was gunned down near Gioia Tauro. According to the Direzione Distrettuale Antimafia (DDA) of Reggio Calabria, after the demise of Girolamo and Peppe Piromalli, their successors have been unable to maintain the necessary balance among the two clans. Background of the emerging conflict seems to be the future investments of hundreds of millions of euros in the Gioia Tauro port and the possibilities to take cuts of the investments. However, a conflict between the clans did not emerge, mainly because the Molé 'ndrina took their loss. An investigation by the DDA ofi Reggio Calabria in 2023, named Hybris, showed a rapprochement between the Piromalli and Molé clans, who have resumed dialogue 15 years after the murder of Rocco Molé to advance their illicit strategic objectives.

== Interests in the agro-industry ==
The Piromalli clan, along with other powerful 'Ndrangheta families like the Pesce and Mancuso clans, is heavily involved in Calabria’s agro-industry, particularly in the Gioia Tauro plain (Piana di Gioia Tauro), known for olive and citrus cultivation. Starting in the 1980s, the 'Ndrangheta clans exploited EU agricultural subsidies by fraudulently invoicing for non-existent produce ("paper oranges") and laundering construction profits through land purchases. A 2008 change in the EU subsidy system, which offered fixed payments per hectare regardless of output, further incentivized land acquisition. Many orange groves are now under ‘Ndrangheta control.

An investigation called Provvidenza, showed that the Piromalli clan also took over the control of the Milan fruit and vegetable market from the market from the Morabito 'ndrina and held sway over the Copam cooperative in Varapodio, which received €2.6 million in EU funds. Additionally, they exported counterfeit extra virgin olive oil to the U.S., mislabeling low-grade, chemically extracted oil and distributing it through retail chains in major cities. Key figures in the investigation included Pino Mammolito, Antonio Piromalli (born 1972, son of Pino Piromalli), and his uncle, also named Antonio Piromalli (born 1939), Pino's brother. While the elder brothers, Pino and Antonio, were acquitted on appeal, the younger Antonio received a prison sentence of 19 years and 4 months.

== Crackdown ==
In July 2008, police cracked down on the stranglehold of the 'Ndrangheta on the port in an operation dubbed "One Hundred Years of History" which netted 18 criminals and businessmen in Calabria, Rome and Milan. The operation also intended to end the start of a possibly bloody turf war between the Piromallis and their former military arm, the Molè family.

On October 13, 2008, one of the clan bosses, Gioacchino Piromalli, was arrested along with his nephew, also named Gioacchino Piromalli, who is a lawyer, as well as Gioia Tauro's former mayor and deputy mayor. Both had been forced to step down in April 2008 when the city council was dissolved on suspicion of Mafia infiltration. The mayors were accused of employing the younger Piromalli. Police believe the legal work was a front to enable the Piromallis to regain a slice of the business generated by Gioia Tauro, one of the largest container ports in Europe.

In September 2025, a major operation against the clan named 'Res Tauro' led by the Reggio Calabria District Anti-Mafia Directorate (DDA) resulted in the arrest of Giuseppe "Pino" Piromalli and 25 individuals facing charges that include mafia-type criminal association, extortion, money laundering, and the illegal possession of weapons and ammunition. The investigation, which began in 2020, aimed to map out the structure of the Piromalli clan – still considered a significant powerful faction within the broader 'Ndrangheta network. Authorities identified the three historical Piromalli brothers as key figures in the organisation: Pino (born in 1945), along with Gioacchino (born in 1934) and Antonio (born in 1949). All three are accused of playing leading roles in the clan's strategic and operational management, and Pino was identified as the main suspect and is believed to have been the leader, promoter, and organizer of the criminal organization.

== Sources ==
- Arlacchi, Pino (1988). Mafia Business. The Mafia ethic and the spirit of capitalism, Oxford: Oxford University Press ISBN 0-19-285197-7
- Dickie, John (2013). Mafia Republic: Italy's Criminal Curse. Cosa Nostra, 'Ndrangheta and Camorra from 1946 to the Present, London: Sceptre ISBN 978-1-444-72640-4
- (in Italian) Gratteri, Nicola & Antonio Nicaso (2006). Fratelli di Sangue, Cosenza: Luigi Pellegrini Editore ISBN 88-8101-373-8
- (in Italian) Guarino, Mario (2004). Poteri segreti e criminalità. L'intreccio inconfessabile tra 'ndrangheta, massoneri a apparati dello stato, Bari: Edizioni Dedalo ISBN 88-220-5340-0
- Paoli, Letizia (2003). Mafia Brotherhoods: Organized Crime, Italian Style, Oxford/New York: Oxford University Press ISBN 0-19-515724-9 (Review by Klaus Von Lampe) (Review by Alexandra V. Orlova)
- (in Italian) Sciarrone, Rocco (1998). Mafie vecchie, mafie nuove: Radicamento ed espansione, Rome: Donzelli Editore ISBN 88-7989-435-8
- Spotts, Frederic & Theodor Wieser (1986), Italy, a Difficult Democracy: A Survey of Italian Politics, Cambridge University Press, ISBN 0-521-31511-5
