= Giuseppe Piromalli (born 1921) =

Italian crime boss (1921–2005)

- Mugshot of 'Ndrangheta boss Giuseppe Piromalli
- Born: March 1, 1921; Gioia Tauro, Calabria, Kingdom of Italy
- Died: February 19, 2005 (aged 83); Gioia Tauro, Calabria, Italy
- Other name: Peppino
- Relatives: Girolamo Piromalli (brother); Giuseppe Piromalli (nephew)
- Allegiance: Piromalli 'ndrina; 'Ndrangheta

Giuseppe "Peppino" Piromalli (1 March 1921 – 19 February 2005) was an Italian criminal known as a member of the 'Ndrangheta in Calabria. A native of Gioia Tauro, Piromalli was one of the most famous of the 'Ndrangheta bosses and headed the Piromalli 'ndrina. He redirected the 'Ndrangheta clan from its rural base to an entrepreneurial criminal organisation.

== Most powerful criminal group ==
Piromalli ruled the most powerful mafia group in the Piana di Gioia Tauro. He inherited this position from his elder brother Girolamo Mommo Piromalli, who died of natural causes in 1979. The Piromalli 'ndrina contains more than 200 members. Since the mid-1970s, according to several pentiti, members of the Nirta family from San Luca and the Piromalli family rotated among themselves the position of capo crimine. In Gioia Tauro, blood relatives of the Piromalli long represented the interests of the clan in the city council.

The Piromallis were allied with their relatives of the Molè family. Often they are referred to as the Piromalli-Molè clan. "The Molè family is the military arm of the Piromalli clan," according to Francesco Forgione, chairman of Italian parliament's Antimafia Commission. Control of the Gioia Tauro container hub has allowed the Piromalli clan to dominate not only the illegal drug trade but also arms and other contraband smuggling. The Piromalli-Molè clan in recent years turned the syndicate into a modern and high-tech criminal organization. Within the Piromalli organization the Molè clan is responsible for drug trafficking and handles relations with 'Ndrangheta branches in central and northern Italy as well as with Colombian drug cartels.

== Entrepreneurial mafia ==
Together with his elder brother Girolamo Piromalli, Giuseppe redirected the 'Ndrangheta clan from its rural base to an entrepreneurial criminal organisation assuming dominance over several public works in the Gioia Tauro area, particularly in the construction and operation of the new container seaport. When in 1974 businesses involved in the expansion of the port and steelworks in Gioia Tauro offered a three per cent kickback to be left in peace, the three leading 'Ndrangheta families at the time, Antonio Macrì, the Piromalli brothers and the De Stefano brothers rejected the offer and wanted to be sub-contracted on work carried in order to control the projects.

The subcontracts for the steelwork in Gioia Tauro, whose total value reached the astronomic amount of US$3,800 billion were largely distributed on the basis of territorial criteria. More than half the contracts were granted to a single cosca, the Piromalli family, which dominated the area where the steelwork was supposed to be built. The managers of the consortium responsible for the completion of the port and the steelworks made Gioacchino Piromalli an official associate – the company subsequently did not suffer from extortion or inflicted damage of any kind in an area where the previous 154 explosive attacks were committed.

== Arrests ==
Accused of ordering the killing of rival 'Ndranghetisti Piromalli went on the run. He was captured on February 24, 1984. He was convicted to 11 life sentences. However, the conviction was reduced to one life sentence on appeal. In 1986 he was convicted for mafia association. The same year Piromalli joined the Radical Party, and the party leader Marco Pannella publicly campaigned on Piromalli’s behalf against the severe Article 41-bis prison regime.

== Supporting Berlusconi ==
Piromalli continued to try to get released from the strict prison regime. During the 1994 Italian general election, candidates for Silvio Berlusconi's Pole of Good Government coalition, such as Tiziana Maiolo and Vittorio Sgarbi, both of whom visited Piromalli in jail, actively campaigned in southern Italy, criticizing the excessive influence of investigative magistrates and highlighting the harm that organized crime investigations had inflicted on the regional economy. In return, Piromalli declared in open court: "We will vote for Berlusconi."

== Death ==
Terminally ill with cancer, Piromalli was released to the care of his family in 2003. At the age of 83, he died on 19 February 2005 in Gioia Tauro, attended by relatives and former associates. His nephew Giuseppe Piromalli succeeded him.

== Sources ==
- Arlacchi, Pino (1988). Mafia Business. The Mafia ethic and the spirit of capitalism, Oxford: Oxford University Press ISBN 0-19-285197-7
- Paoli, Letizia (2003). Mafia Brotherhoods: Organized Crime, Italian Style, Oxford/New York: Oxford University Press ISBN 0-19-515724-9
- (in Italian) Sciarrone, Rocco (1998). Mafie vecchie, mafie nuove: Radicamento ed espansione, Rome: Donzelli Editore ISBN 88-7989-435-8
