= Port of Gioia Tauro =

Major South-Italian seaport

Coordinates: 38°26′N 15°54′E

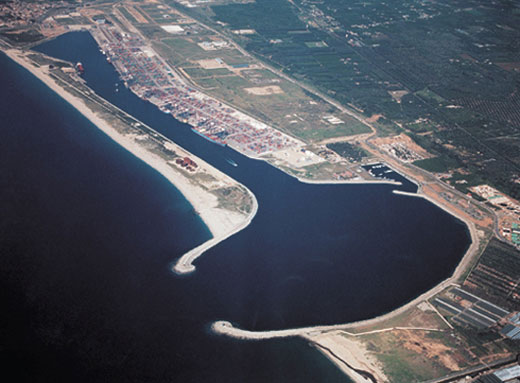
Port of Gioia Tauro

The Port of Gioia Tauro (Italian: [ˈdʒɔːja ˈtauro]) is a large seaport in southern Italy. It is the largest port in Italy for container throughput, the 8th largest in Europe (as of 2025) and the 6th largest in the Mediterranean Sea. Located north of the city of Reggio Calabria, between the municipalities of Gioia Tauro and San Ferdinando, Calabria, it is close to the East–West route which stretches from the Strait of Gibraltar to the Suez Canal and serves mainly as a transshipment hub, connecting the global and regional networks that cross the Mediterranean.

The port benefits from the natural depth of its water (up to 18 meters) and offers one of the longest linear quays available in the Mediterranean (3.4 km). These characteristics, together with the availability of dedicated equipment (22 Ship-to-shore cranes, reaching up to 23 rows of containers), enable the port to serve four Ultra Large Container Vessels simultaneously, a unique feature among Mediterranean ports. The throughput of the port reached 3,467,772 TEUs in 2008, then declined consistently from 2009 to 2011, reflecting the global economic crisis. From 2011 to 2013 the traffic volumes in Gioia Tauro increased, but then fell again between 2013 and 2015, suffering from the difficult conditions of the transhipment market in the Mediterranean and the competition from other major transhipment hubs in Greece, Egypt and Malta. However, following a major management shift in 2019, the port saw a dramatic resurgence, reaching a record peak of approximately 4.5 million TEUs in 2025.

== Terminal layout and main characteristics ==
The port district has a total area of 4,400,000 square meters (440 ha) and it is located in a median position along the coast of the gulf of Gioia Tauro. It has a channel configuration with an internal water surface area of 180 acres. The main channel runs parallel to the coast for the length of the port. The entrance of the channel is 300 meters wide and broadens into a turning basin 750 meters in diameter. The port channel extends northbound for more than 3 km, with a width ranging from 200 to 250 meters. At the northern end of the channel there is a second turning basin with a diameter of 500 meters. The port has 5,125 meters of docks, with 3,391 meters along the east side, 814 meters along the north side and 920 meters along the west side. The water depth is 18 meters throughout the port.

== History ==
The design of the port of Gioia Tauro can be traced back to the political and programmatic situation in Calabria in the early 1970s, in particular the Reggio revolt in Reggio Calabria. To pacify the revolt, Prime minister Emilio Colombo offered to build the Fifth Steelwork Centre in Reggio including a railroad stump and the port in Gioia Tauro, an investment of 3 billion lire which would create 10,000 jobs, which softened the people of Reggio Calabria. This so-called "Colombo package" was developed as a compensatory measure for Reggio Calabria's failure to be designated as the regional capital. The coastal area of the Piana di Gioia Tauro, traditionally cultivated with citrus fruit and olive groves, was identified as the appropriate site for the steel plant. However, the plant was never built, given that steel overproduction made the steel project useless.

The area of Gioia Tauro was subsequently designated as the site of a new ENEL coal-fired power station, which was also never built. At the end of the 1970s the main harbour works (docks and piers), were already carried out. The port area, involved in the unfinished construction work, was finally re-purposed as a large commercial port, following the idea of Contship Italia founder, Angelo Ravano, who envisioned the transformation of the disused port into a global hub along the Suez Canal - Gibraltar transport route in the Mediterranean, capable of catering for the huge modern container ships, whose size and relevance for international trades kept growing. The development and transformation of the port into a global transhipment hub started in 1995, and involved the establishment of a harbour master, a customs office, a station of the Italian Finance Police (Guardia di Finanza), a fire station, and a State Police station.

In 2019, the port entered a significant new phase of industrial stability when Mediterranean Shipping Company (MSC), through Terminal Investment Limited (TIL), acquired full control of the Medcenter Container Terminal (MCT) by purchasing the remaining 50% stake from Contship Italia. This transition ended a period of uncertainty and led to an investment of over €140 million in equipment upgrades and new intermodal rail links to Northern Italy launched in early 2025.

Despite substantial public and private investments, the Port of Gioia Tauro has long struggled to meet the expectations of its stakeholders, for a number of reasons, going from the lack of political commitment for the development of an adequate inland connectivity, capable of expanding the scope of the port catchment area, to the fierce market competition from emerging countries, as well as the persisting crisis of the transhipment, exacerbated by the higher cost of labour in Italy and the heavier anchor taxes, hindering the competitiveness of the Italian hub versus most of its direct competitors in the Mediterranean.

== Port safety and security ==
Essential to the port development was to guarantee a high security standard to all the economic operators. Therefore, the "International Ship and Port Facility Security Code" (ISPS), has been implemented to prevent acts of terrorism and to address any kind of emergency situation. In Italy, the port security is based on the governmental functions of the CISM (International Committee for Port Maritime Safety), with the task to develop a national program against acts of terrorism aimed at the maritime sector and to establish the security levels set by the IMO (International Maritime Organization). At the port of Gioia Tauro, the security and monitoring services are carried out by the "Gioia Tauro Port Security," with its registered office at the offices of the Port Authority. It is an organizational branch of the Port Authority, carrying out security services including document checking; monitoring ships, luggage, vehicles; and area surveillance.

== Ships ==
The large scale of the port infrastructures and its nature of mega-transhipment hub attracted, during the years, some of the largest ships in the world. Commercial operations in the Port of Gioia Tauro began on September 16, 1995 on the m/v CMBT Concord (1,797 TEUs). On August 6, 1998 the port welcomed for the first time the m/v Regina Maersk, at the time the largest container ship in the world (6,400 TEUs, 318 m. long).

On January 14, 2008 the MSC Daniela arrives in Gioia Tauro. It is the largest container ship to have ever called at an Italian port. With its 14,000 TEUs capacity, 366 meters of length and 56 meters of width, the MSC ship marks the beginning of a new era for mega-ships. On January 19, 2013 MCT operates simultaneously on three 14,000 TEUs ships: MSC Gaia (13798 TEU); MSC Ravenna (14000 TEU) and MSC Daniela (14000 TEU). On January 30, 2015 the port of Gioia Tauro welcomes the MSC London: with its 16,650 TEUs, it is the largest container carrier to have ever berthed in Italy. As of 2025, the port regularly handles 24,000+ TEU vessels, including the MSC Celestino Maresca class.

== Infiltration by the 'Ndrangheta ==
A major role in limiting the growth of the port is played by the pervasive presence of the organized crime ('Ndrangheta), infiltrating and conditioning the companies operating within the port. Despite the commitment of the terminal operator, supporting the efforts of the police and prosecution trying to eradicate the presence of 'Ndrangheta affiliates among port employees, and the increased public awareness and attention, which caused a large part of the illicit traffics to be re-routed towards alternative destinations, the port is still subject to periodic seizures of large quantities of drugs, which prove the persistence of illicit interests. Since 2003, following the events of September 11, 2001, the port is also part of the "Megaport" network, having joined the United States Container Security Initiative, consisting in a set of special procedures and controls, performed directly by US personnel, operating within the ports in collaboration with the local customs offices, to guarantee the highest possible safety standards for cargo inspection and tracking.

According to a 2006 report, Italian investigators estimate that 80% of Europe's cocaine arrives from Colombia via Gioia Tauro's docks. The port is also involved in the illegal arms trade. These activities are controlled by the 'Ndrangheta. However, according to a report of the European Monitoring Centre for Drugs and Drug Addiction (EMCDDA) and Europol, the Iberian Peninsula is considered the main entry point for cocaine into Europe and a gateway to the European market.

The Piromalli-Molè clan managed to condition the management of the new container terminal. Established in the mid-1990s, it became the largest terminal in the Mediterranean, moving over 2 million containers in 1998. Since 1994, when Contship Italia rented the port area to start transshipment activity and the Medcenter Container Terminal was set up thanks to 138 billion lire (about US$86 million) in state financing, the Piromalli’s aimed to oblige the Medcenter company, through its vice president Walter Lugli, and the Contship company, through its president Enrico Ravano, to pay a kickback of US$1.50 for each transshipped container, a sum which corresponded to about half the net profits earned by the two companies.

In February 2008 the parliamentary Antimafia Commission concluded that the ‘Ndrangheta “controls or influences a large part of the economic activity around the port and uses the facility as a base for illegal trafficking.” In its report it said that “the entire gamma of internal or sub-contracted activities is mafia-influenced, from the management of distribution and forwarding to customs control and container storage.” The extortion of Ravano and Contship, was part of a project that “did not involve simply this security tax, which grew with the port, but also control of activities tied to the port, the hiring of workers, and relations with port unions and local institutions,” the report added. “It effectively eliminated legitimate competition from companies not influenced or controlled by the mafia in providing goods and services, performing construction work and hiring personnel. And it threw a shadow over the behaviour of local government and other public bodies.” Law enforcement efforts have continued into 2025; in April of that year, a major operation by the Guardia di Finanza resulted in the seizure of 2,000 kilograms of cocaine hidden in fruit shipments from South America.

== See also ==
- List of busiest ports in Europe
- List of busiest container ports

== Bibliography ==
- Berlinguer, Aldo (ed.) (2016). Porti, retroporti e zone economiche speciali , Turin: G. Giappichelli Editore, ISBN 978-88-9215391-2
- Ginsborg, Paul (1990). A History of Contemporary Italy: 1943-80, London: Penguin Books, ISBN 978-0-14-193167-8
- Paoli, Letizia (2003). Mafia Brotherhoods: Organized Crime, Italian Style, New York: Oxford University Press ISBN 0-19-515724-9 (Review by Klaus Von Lampe) (Review by Alexandra V. Orlova)
- Gratteri N., Nicaso A. (2010). La malapianta, Milano, Arnoldo Mondadori Editore
