= Piromalli =

Piromalli is an Italian surname. Notable people with the surname include:

- Girolamo Piromalli (1918–1979), Italian mobster of the Piromalli 'ndrina
- Giuseppe Piromalli (disambiguation), several people
