= List of members of the Italian Antimafia Commission =

This following is a list of members of the Italian Antimafia Commission, a bicameral body of the Italian Parliament, composed of members from the Chamber of Deputies and the Senate. The Antimafia Commission is a commission of inquiry into, initially, the "phenomenon of the Mafia". Subsequent commissions investigated "organized crime of the Mafia-type", which included other Italian criminal organizations such as the Camorra, the 'Ndrangheta and the Sacra Corona Unita.

- Pino Arlacchi (PDS), vice-president 1994–1996
- Abdon Alinovi (PCI), president 1983–1987
- Rosy Bindi (PD), president 2013–present
- Luigi Carraro (DC), president 1972–1976
- Francesco Cattanei (DC), president 1968–1972
- Roberto Centaro (FI), president 2001–2006
- Gerardo Chiaromonte (PCI), vice-president 1972–1976; president 1988–1992
- Ottaviano Del Turco (SDI), president 1996–2000
- Antonio Di Pietro (IdV), 2008–
- Francesco Forgione (PRC), president 2006–2008
- Antonio Gullotti (DC), vice-president 1963–1968
- Nicola La Penta (DC), president 1982–1983
- Pio La Torre (PCI), 1972–1976
- Girolamo Li Causi (PCI), vice-president 1963–1972
- Giuseppe Lumia (PDS/DS), 2000–, president 2000–2001; vice-president 2006–2008
- Giovanni Matta (DC)
- Filippo Mancuso (FI), vice-president 1996–2000
- Achille Occhetto (PCI), 1983–1987
- Donato Pafundi (DC), president 1963–1968
- Tiziana Parenti (FI), president 1994–1996
- Ferruccio Parri (Independent Left), 1962–1968
- Beppe Pisanu (PdL), president 2008–2013
- Paolo Rossi (PSDI), president 1963
- Oscar Luigi Scalfaro (DC)
- Leonardo Sciascia (PR), 1982–1983
- Cesare Terranova (Independent Left/PCI), 1972–1976
- Walter Veltroni (PD) 2008–
- Nichi Vendola (PRC), vice-president 2001–2005
- Luciano Violante (PCI/PDS), 1983–1994; president 1992–1994
- Claudio Vitalone (DC), vice-president 1983–1987
- Carlo Vizzini (FI), 2001–2009
