= Giuseppe Piromalli (born 1945) =

Italian criminal (born 1945)

- Mugshot of 'Ndrangheta boss Giuseppe Piromalli
- Born: 4 January 1945; Gioia Tauro, Calabria, Kingdom of Italy
- Other name: Facciazza
- Relatives: Giuseppe Piromalli (uncle); Girolamo Piromalli (uncle)
- Allegiance: Piromalli 'ndrina; 'Ndrangheta

Giuseppe Piromalli (Italian pronunciation: [dʒuˈzɛppe piroˈmalli]; born 4 January 1945), also known as "Facciazza" ("Ugly Face"), is an Italian criminal known as a member of the 'Ndrangheta in Calabria. He succeeded his uncle Giuseppe Piromalli as head of the family clan that controls the port of Gioia Tauro and is one of the major powers in the 'Ndrangheta. He became a member of La Provincia, a provincial commission of the 'Ndrangheta, formed at the end of the Second 'Ndrangheta war in September 1991 to avoid further internal conflicts.

He had been a fugitive since 1993 and included in the list of most wanted fugitives in Italy until his capture in March 1999. While in the strict Article 41-bis prison regime, he nevertheless keeps on conducting his business and directing the clan outside.

== Controlling the Gioia Tauro port ==
The Piromalli 'ndrina managed to condition the management of the new container terminal at the port of Gioia Tauro. Established in the mid-1990s, it became the largest terminal in the Mediterranean, moving over 2 million containers in 1998. Since 1994, when Contship Italia rented the port area to start transhipment activity and the Medcenter Container Terminal was set up thanks to 138 billion lire (about US$86 million) in state financing, the Piromallis aimed to oblige the Medcenter company, through its vice president Walter Lugli, and the Contship company, through its president Enrico Ravano, to pay a kickback of US$1.50 for each transhipped container, a sum which corresponded to about half the net profits earned by the two companies.

Additionally, the Piromallis desired contracts, subcontracts, and jobs in the two firms that run the port, as well as from other companies in the surrounding area. Despite subscribing to an anti-corruption pact with the government, the managers of both Contship and Medcenter gave in to the demands. The arrest warrant issued in January 1999 against members of the Piromalli group stated that the two companies contracted firms indicated by the defendants (and in some cases belonging to the latter) in the port-servicing activities and hired people recommended by the Piromalli clan, reinforcing the latter’s power in the Gioia Tauro plain.”

== Other criminal activities ==
Together with their cousins of the Molè family the Piromalli clan are involved in cigarette smuggling and trafficking cocaine using their contacts in the port of Gioia Tauro. The shipments were sent to Sicily, Lazio and Lombardy.

Piromalli is also accused of trying to wring £100,000 a year from Silvio Berlusconi's television network, in return for not blowing up its relay stations in Calabria.

== Arrest ==
He was arrested at dawn on 11 March 1999, in a secret hideout concealed in a derelict hut that turned out to be a fortified complex packed with hidden rooms, protected by electronic metal shutters and a remote-operated secret escape route. He was unarmed and did not oppose arrest. In his bedroom, there was an altar dedicated to the Madonna of Polsi, in the municipality of San Luca, where the chiefs of the 'Ndrangheta locali meet regularly during the September Feast. He was incarcerated under the strict article 41-bis prison regime. He nevertheless keeps on conducting his business and directs the clan outside.

The Piromalli clan tried to relax the strict regime of their boss. One of the plots was to deliver votes to Berlusconi’s People of Freedom (Il Popolo della Libertà, PdL) coalition during the election campaign in 2008 in return for a relaxation of Piromalli’s prison stature. Aldo Micciché, a businessman who moved to Venezuela after being convicted of fraudulent bankruptcy in Italy, planned to fill in 50,000 blank ballot slips for Italian voters in Latin America obtained from corrupt officials. Micciché asked two leading members of the Piromalli clan to visit Marcello Dell'Utri – Berlusconi's right-hand man – at his Milan office. Dell'Utri was taped after the meeting complimenting Micciché for introducing him to two 'good picciotti,' a Sicilian expression used to describe low-level mafiosi.

== Release and re-arrest ==
Pino Piromalli was released from prison in May 2021 after serving 22 years behind bars. However, in September 2025, he was arrested once again. His arrest came as part of a major operation against the clan named 'Res Tauro' led by the Reggio Calabria District Anti-Mafia Directorate (DDA). The operation resulted in the arrest of 26 individuals facing charges that include mafia-style criminal association, extortion, money laundering, and the illegal possession of weapons and ammunition. Piromalli was identified as the main suspect and is believed to have been the leader, promoter, and organizer of the criminal organization.

Following his release in 2021, Pino Piromalli reasserted his authority by reinstating the traditional rules of the 'Ndrangheta, reorganizing the clan, assigning roles and responsibilities, and reestablishing control over the territory. The investigation, which began in 2020, aimed to map out the structure of the Piromalli clan – still considered a significant powerful faction within the broader 'Ndrangheta network. Authorities identified the three Piromalli brothers as key figures in the organisation: Pino (born in 1945), along with Gioacchino (born in 1934) and Antonio (born in 1939). All three are accused of playing leading roles in the clan's strategic and operational management.
