= Cecilia Eckelmann Battistello =

Italian businesswoman (1950–2024)

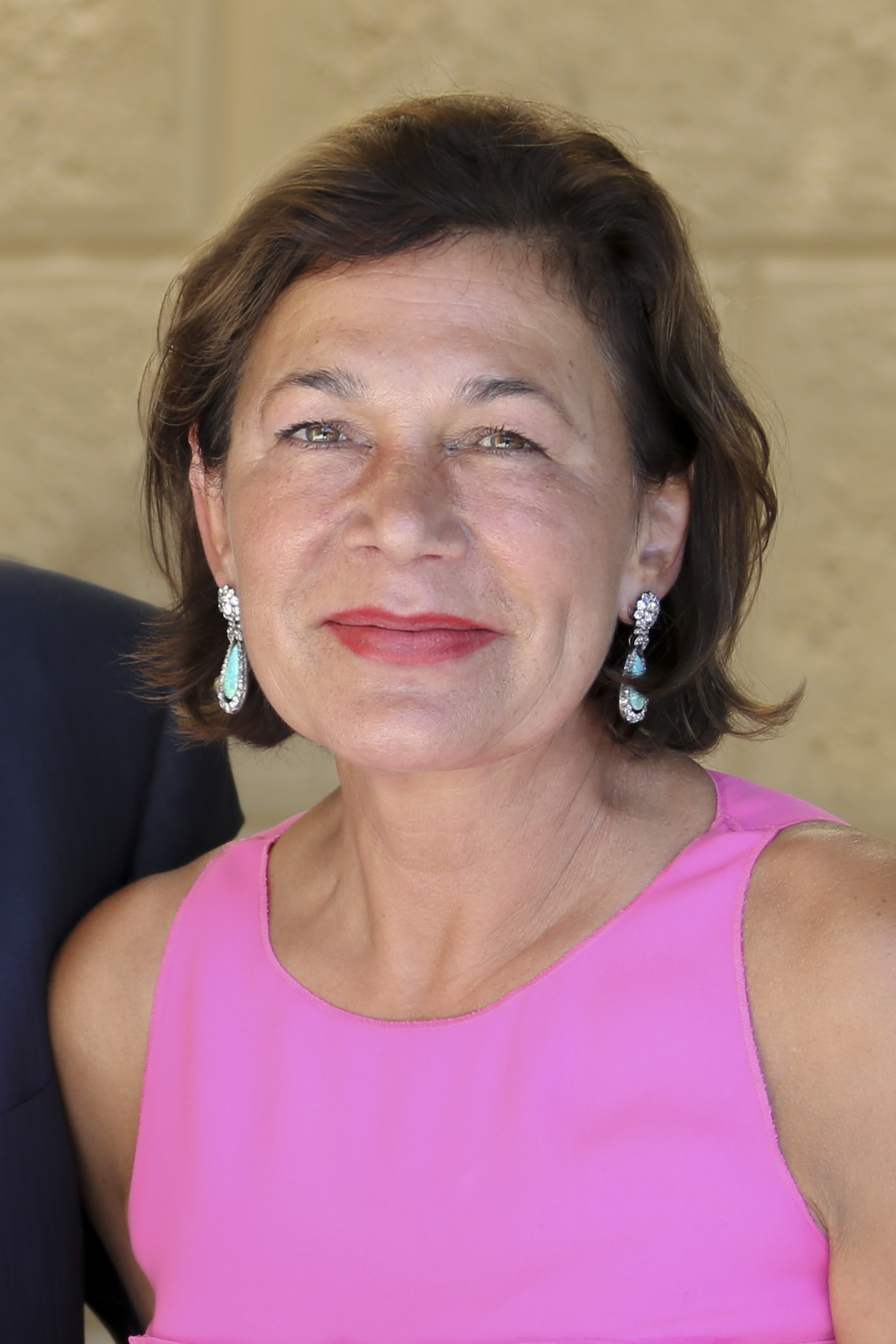

Cecilia Eckelmann Battistello (13 April 1950 – 6 March 2024) was an Italian-born British businesswoman who was president and managing director of the Contship Italia Group.

== Life and career ==
Battistello started her career in the shipping industry in Switzerland as a commercial representative for Contship Containerlines. In 1988, she was appointed managing director of the company and in 1989 she became the first woman to chair the UK India Pakistan Bangladesh Shipping Conference. In 1993, she assumed the role of vice-president and in 1996 she was elected chairman and CEO. In 1998, after the sale of Contship Containerlines to CP Ships she resigned as Board Chairman and became President of Contship Italia. From 2005 to 2010 she was President of FEPORT (Federation of European Private Port Operators).

In February 2020 her autobiography "Il sogno di Cecilia - Una Nave Rosa Attraverso l’Oceano" was published. The book was written by the director and television writer Aldo Innocenti as co-author and published by Mondadori.

Battistello died in Hamburg on 6 March 2024, at the age of 73.

== Awards and honours ==
In 1992, The Times dedicated an article to her for introducing a series of containerships whose hulls and superstructure were painted pink.

In 2014, she won the Bellisario prize in the category “Entrepreneurship”.

In 2015, London Containerisation International assigned her the Lifetime Achievement Award in recognition of her career in the global shipping industry.

In 2016, she was featured in Lloyd's List's Top 100 Most Influential People in Shipping.
