= Francesco Forgione =

Francesco Forgione may refer to:

- Francesco Forgione, birthname of Padre Pio, an Italian Capuchin friar
- Francesco Forgione (politician), a member of the Italian Chamber of Deputies
