= Giuseppe Piromalli =

Giuseppe Piromalli may refer to:

- Giuseppe Piromalli (born 1921) (1921–2005), Calabrian 'Ndrangheta crime boss
- Giuseppe Piromalli (born 1945), Calabrian 'Ndrangheta crime boss, nephew and successor of the above
