= Girolamo Molè =

- Born: 1 February 1961 (age 65); Gioia Tauro, Calabria
- Occupation: Mafia boss
- Status: Imprisoned
- Allegiance: Molè 'ndrina
- Criminal charges: Arms trafficking drug trafficking Mafia-type association multiple murders
- Penalty: Life imprisonment

Girolamo Molè (Italian pronunciation: [dʒiˈrɔːlamo moˈlɛ]; born 1 February 1961, in Gioia Tauro), also known as Mommo, is an Italian criminal and a member of the 'Ndrangheta in Calabria. He is currently serving several life sentences.

He was the son of the historical 'Ndrangheta boss in the Gioia Tauro area, Antonio Molè. The clan has at least one hundred years of history, according to Mommo Molè in an overheard conversation. The Molè brothers, Girolamo, Domenico and Rocco took over the reins of the clan from their father.

== Alliance with Piromalli 'ndrina ==
The Molè clan was allied with their relatives of the Piromalli 'ndrina, also from Gioia Tauro. Often they are referred to as a single organisation, the Piromalli-Molè clan. They have an iron grip on many economic activities in the area, in particular over the Gioia Tauro seaport, the largest container terminal in the Mediterranean.

"The Molè family is the military arm of the Piromalli clan", according to Francesco Forgione, the former chairman of Italian parliament's Antimafia Commission. Within the Piromalli organization the Molè clan is responsible for drug trafficking and handles relations with 'Ndrangheta branches in central and northern Italy as well as with Colombian drug cartels.

== Arrest ==
Wanted since 1993 and included on the list of most wanted fugitives in Italy, he was arrested on July 12, 1997. At the time he was charged with 49 murders, arms trafficking, drug trafficking and criminal association. In August 2000, he was convicted to 11 life sentences at the Tirreno trial against the Piromalli-Molè clan.

While in jail a turf war between the Piromalli and Molè clans surfaced in February 2008 when Girolamo’s brother, Rocco Molè, was gunned down near Gioia Tauro. A conflict emerged over the tender of a contract over All Services, a company for the movement of cargo at the port, which was gained by the Alvaro clan, with the consent of the Piromallis. Background of the emerging conflict seems to be the future investments of hundreds of millions of euros in the Gioia Tauro port and the possibilities to take cuts of the investments.

== Crackdown by police ==
Within 24 hours after the contract was awarded to the rival clan, Rocco Molè was killed. While Girolamo’s brother Domenico wanted to retaliate immediately, proposing to kill all the adversaries, Girolamo was more cautious. He wanted peaceful mediation, reminding his brother of the long alliance and the dangers of an all-out war. “We have one hundred years of history and family ties with the Piromallis that we cannot wipe out,” he was overheard saying from prison.

Alarmed by the increasing tension, police cracked down on the stranglehold of the 'Ndrangheta on the Gioia Tauro port in July 2008. The operation was dubbed "One Hundred Years of History", after the overheard conversation, and netted 18 criminals and businessmen in Calabria, Rome and Milan. The operation intended to end the start of a possibly bloody turf war between the Piromallis and their former military arm, the Molè family.
