= Direzione Investigativa Antimafia =

Italian multi-force law enforcement agency

- Active: Since 1991
- Country: Italy
- Allegiance: Polizia di Stato; Arma dei Carabinieri; Guardia di Finanza; Polizia Penitenziaria
- Type: Interforce investigation office
- Role: Contrast of mafia
- Part of: Department of Public Security (Italian Ministry of the Interior)
- Headquarters: Rome and other 20 peripheral offices
- Motto: Vis Unita Fortior (Strength United is Stronger)
- Website: http://direzioneinvestigativaantimafia.interno.gov.it

Commanders
- Director: Maurizio Vallone

The Direzione Investigativa Antimafia (DIA), also known as the Anti-Mafia Investigative Directorate, is an Italian multi-force investigation body under the Department of Public Security of the Ministry of the Interior. Its main task is the fight against the mafia-related organized crime in Italy.

== History ==
The DIA was established with the law decree n. 345 of 29 October 1991, following the intensification of the fight against the Sicilian Mafia in Italy, just before the killing of magistrate Giovanni Falcone, the main inspiration and promoter of the DIA, and was created with the urgent decree during the Andreotti VII government and Italian Minister of Justice Claudio Martelli as a police multi-force body (Carabinieri, Polizia di Stato and Guardia di Finanza).

The DIA was established just before the Direzione Nazionale Antimafia ('National Anti-Mafia Directorate'), with its national anti-mafia prosecutor, and the direzioni distrettuali antimafia ('Districtual Anti-Mafia Directorates'), spread on all the Italian territory within the 26 Court of Appeal. The first director of DIA was the general of Carabinieri Giuseppe Tavormina.

Since 2013, as a police force with general competence, the Polizia Penitenziaria has been part of the DIA organics according to the legislative decree n. 218 of 15 November 2012.

== Description ==
The DIA is a specialized investigation body with the exclusive task of ensuring the proceeding, in a coordinated form, of the preventive investigation activities regarding the organized crime, and to carry out judiciary police investigations related exclusively to crimes attributable to like-mafia associations.

It is an inter-force composition; members are selected from those of the Italian police forces and from the civil personnel of the internal administration (belonging to the public security).

=== Structure ===
DIA has its own collocation within the Department of Public Security. It has full administrative-financial and management autonomy and its organization is defined by the Ministry of Interior with proper decrees, after consulting the Consiglio generale per la lotta alla criminalità organizzata ('General Council for the Contrast Against Organized Crime').

At the top of the structure there is a director, chosen in rotation between general officers of Guardia di Finanza and Carabinieri as well as senior directors of Polizia di Stato who had matured a specific competence in the field of the fight against organized crime. In the exercise of his functions, the director is joined to two deputy director, and to one of them is given also the vicarious function, who have the task of overseeing respectively the operative and administrative activities.

The organization is formed by a central building in Rome, articulated in a cabinet division, 3 departments ('Preventive Investigations', 'Judicial Investigations' and 'International Relations for Investigation Purposes') and 7 offices. DIA has a peripheral structure formed by 12 operative centers (Turin, Milan, Genoa, Padua, Florence, Rome, Naples, Bari, Reggio Calabria, Palermo, Catania, Caltanissetta) and 9 operative sections (Trieste, Salerno, Lecce, Catanzaro, Messina, Trapani, Agrigento, Bologna, Brescia).

=== Functions ===
DIA has the tasks of performing investigations of judiciary police related to crimes of mafia-type association and it ensures the progress of preventive investigation activities regarding organized crime.

The director of DIA can propose to courts, competent for territory, the imposition of preventive measures both personal (like special surveillance) and patrimonial (seizure of assets) kind. In particular, the DIA, coordinated by Anti-mafia National Prosecutor, and the anti-mafia district directorates use their instruments as well as the Central DNA laboratory of Polizia Penitenziaria for own investigations.

== Statistics ==
From 1992 to 31 December 2018, DIA seized assets for over €17 billion and confiscation for almost €10 billion. Moreover, in the same period, about 10 501 people accused of mafia association had been arrested.

== Organization ==
- Director: divisional general of Carabinieri Giuseppe Governale (2 October 2017– )
- Deputy technical operative director (vicarious): senior director of Polizia di Stato Gilberto Roman Guglielmo Caldarozzi
- Deputy administrative director: brigadier general of Guardia di Finanza Alessandro Popoli.

== Directors ==
- Giuseppe Tavormina (1991–1993) divisional general of Carabinieri
- Gianni De Gennaro (1993–1994) general director of Public Security
- Giovanni Verdicchio (1994–1997) general of Guardia di Finanza
- Carlo Alfiero (1997–2001) divisional general of Carabinieri
- Agatino Pappalardo (2001–2002) general director of Public Security
- Achille Dello Russo (2002–2005) general director of Public Security
- Cosimo Sasso (2005–2008) general of Guardia di Finanza
- Antonio Girone (2008–2011) divisional general of Carabinieri
- Alfonso D'Alfonso (2011–2012) general director of Public Security
- Arturo De Felice (2012–2014) general director of State Police
- Nunzio Antonio Ferla (2014–2017) divisional general of Guardia di Finanza
- Giuseppe Governale (2017 – ) divisional general of Carabinieri

== See also ==
- Organized crime in Italy
- Antimafia Commission
- Antimafia Pool
- DIGOS

== Bibliography ==
- Iannielli, Francesco; Rocchegiani, Michele (1995). La direzione investigativa antimafia. Giuffrè.
- Muhm, Raoul; Caselli, Gian Carlo (2005). Il ruolo del Pubblico Ministero – Esperienze in Europa. Rome: Vecchiarelli Editore Manziana. ISBN 888247156X.
- Sole, Davide (2011). Codice delle leggi antimafia e delle misure di prevenzione. Maggioli.
