= Contship Italia Group =

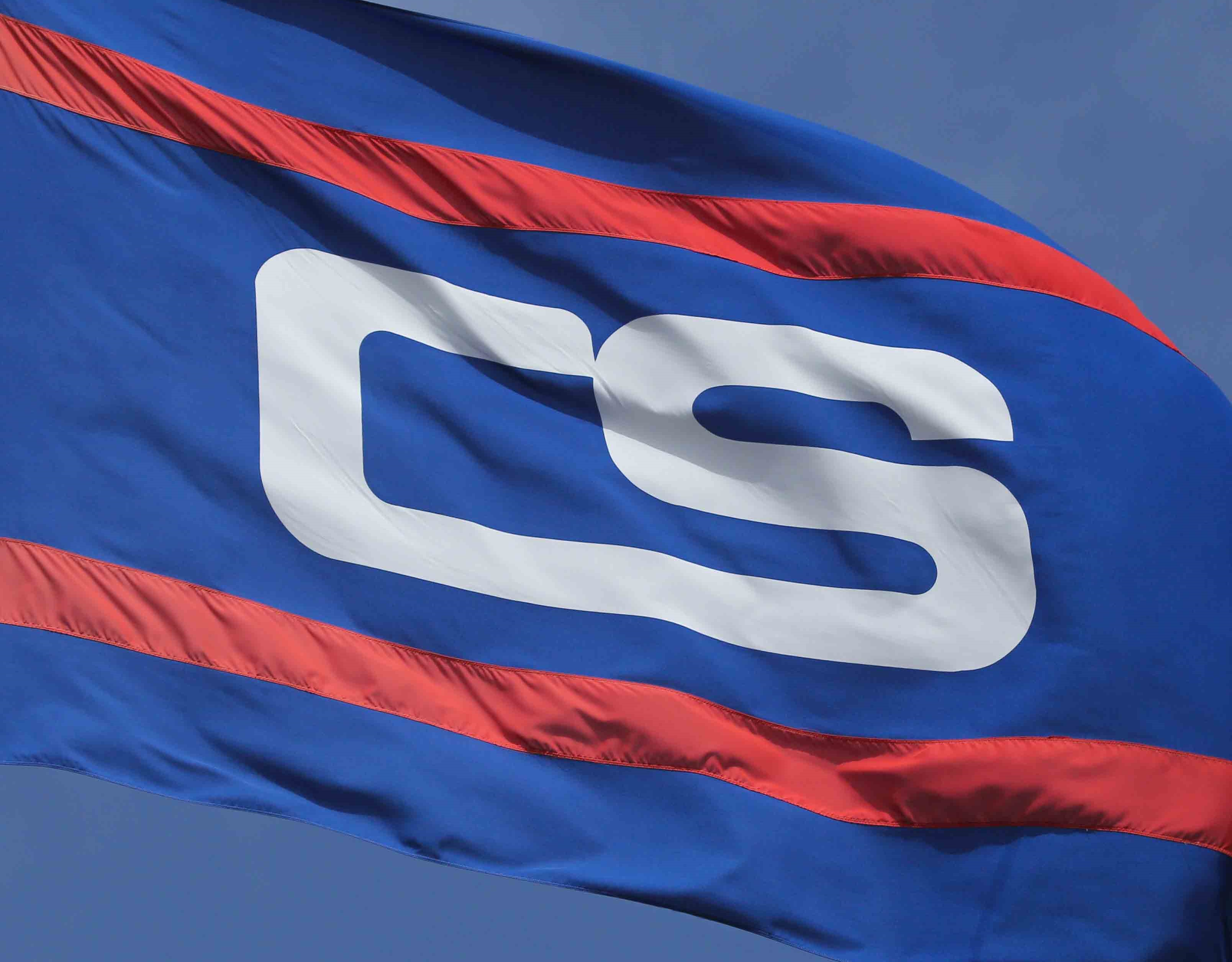
- Company type: Corporate Group
- Industry: Maritime Terminals & Intermodal Logistics
- Founded: 1969
- Founders: Angelo Ravano
- Headquarters: Melzo (MI), Italy
- Area served: Mediterranean Countries and Europe
- Key people: Cecilia Eckelmann Battistello, Thomas Eckelmann, Sebastiano Grasso
- Products: Terminals and integrated intermodal solutions
- Revenue: Euro 329.8 million (2017)
- Owner: EUROKAI GmbH & Co. KGaA
- Number of employees: 3,000 (average, 2013)
- Website: www.contshipitalia.com/en/

Contship Italia Group is an Italian container terminal, intermodal and logistics operator.

== History ==
Contship, “Container Shipping”, founded by the Italian entrepreneur Angelo Ravano, was specialised in maritime transport and, in particular, container transport. By the end of the Nineties, Contship was a global company with services running to South America, the United States, the Pacific, sub-continental Australia and the Middle East. One of its subsidiaries, Contship Italia, had been active in La Spezia since 1971 where it ran the first Italian private container terminal. In 1997 Contship’s shipping lines were sold to the CP Ships Group (today under the brand Hapag Lloyd) and thus the name Contship Containerlines disappeared. Contship Italia stayed as an independent company, not owned by CP and is still active with its network of maritime container terminals at La Spezia, Cagliari, Ravenna, Salerno and Tangier to serve central Europe’s main industrial and consumptions areas. In 2018, in partnership with the Italian Center for Economic Studies and Researches SRM, Contship produced the first analysis on logistic corridors efficiency for containerized cargo within the framework of the research activities of the Permanent Observatory on the Economy of Maritime Transport and Logistics. In 2019 Mediterranean Shipping Company’s Terminal Investment Ltd (TIL) has taken over control of Medcenter Container Terminal S.p.A.

== Subsidiaries ==
Maritime Container Terminals	2017 Total Moves
Eurogate Tanger	1,438,000
LSCT - La Spezia Container Terminal	1,378,000
TCR - Terminal Container Ravenna	185,000
CICT - Cagliari International Container Terminal	433,000
SCT - Salerno Container Terminal	420,000

Intermodal and logistics	2017
RHM - Rail Hub Milano - Melzo: Inland terminal solutions (including equipment depot, maintenance and repair)	Operated trains: 5,715
Hannibal Spa: Domestic and International Intermodal solutions the main Italian ports to central and Northern European industrial areas.	Transported TEU: 301,009
Oceanogate Italia: rail traction and shunting services.	Operated trains km: 1,073,425
Sogemar: Real Estate and I.T.	
