= Giuseppe Tavormina =

Italian officer (1929–2017)

- Born: 10 June 1929; Ribera
- Died: 19 June 2017 (aged 88); Rome
- Burial place: Ribera
- Military career
- Service years: 1951–1994
- Rank: Divisional general
- Awards: 21 July 2000: Silver Cross of Merit of the Italian Army; October 1, 2011: Knight Grand Cross of the Order of Merit of the Italian Republic

Giuseppe Tavormina (10 June 1929 – 19 June 2017) was an Italian General officer of the Arma dei Carabinieri and former head of the DIA and of CESIS.

== Biography ==
Giuseppe Tavormina attended the Military Academy of Modena where he graduated as second lieutenant of the Arma dei Carabinieri. He studied Law at the University of Rome. He was appointed commander of the Carabinieri station of Cagliari, subsequently colonel, head of the Carabinieri cadet school and finally of the local nucleus of Turin. Promoted as brigade general, he was appointed as Chief of Staff of the Arma dei Carabinieri and remained in charge from July 1987 to July 1989.

In January 1991 he became divisional general of the Carabinieri's military body "Podgora". In October 1991 Tavormina was charged central manager of the Direzione Investigativa Antimafia. From April 1993 to July 1994, he covered the role of head of the Comitato esecutivo per i servizi di informazione e sicurezza

After having been consultant of the Italian Court of Audit, in June 1998 he became consultant of the political and juridical question for the then Minister of Economics Carlo Azeglio Ciampi and lastly consultant of the President of Italy, from 1999 to 2006.

On 21 July 2000 he was decorated with the Silver Cross of Merit of the Italian Army and, on 1 October 2001, as Knight Grand Cross Order of Merit of the Italian Republic.

Tavormina died on 19 June 2017. He was buried in his hometown of Ribera.
