= Girolamo Piromalli =

Italian criminal

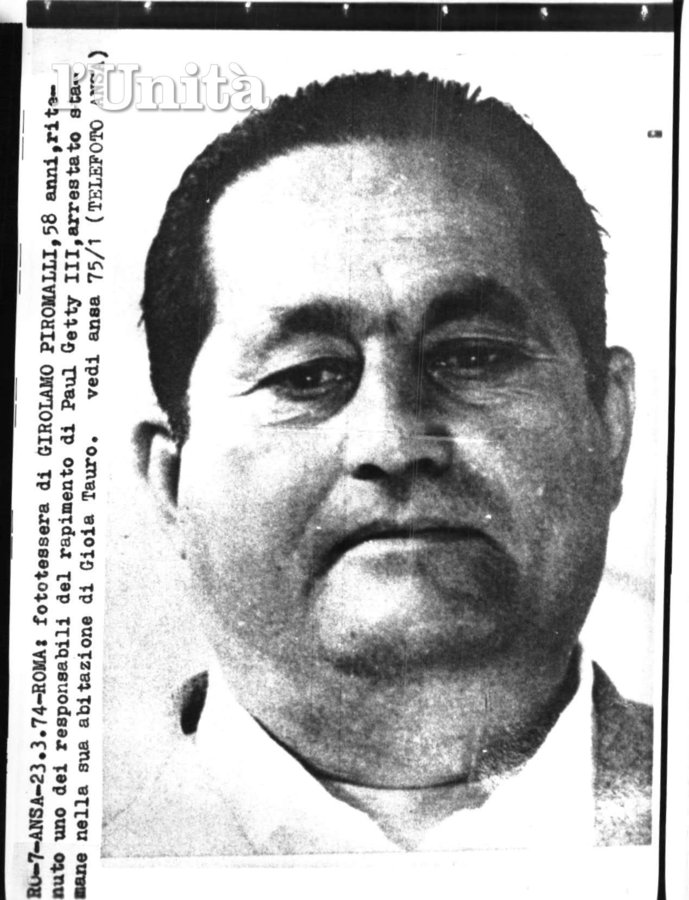
- Mugshot of Girolamo Piromalli in 1974
- Born: October 7, 1918; Gioia Tauro, Calabria, Kingdom of Italy
- Died: February 11, 1979 (aged 60); Gioia Tauro, Calabria, Italy
- Other name: Mommo
- Relatives: Giuseppe Piromalli (brother); Giuseppe Piromalli (nephew)
- Allegiance: Piromalli 'ndrina; 'Ndrangheta

Girolamo "Mommo" Piromalli (October 7, 1918 – February 11, 1979) was an Italian criminal and member of the 'Ndrangheta. He was capobastone (head of command) of the Piromalli 'ndrina based in his hometown Gioia Tauro on the Tyrrhenian coast of Calabria.

== 'Ndrangheta boss ==
Mommo Piromalli ruled the most powerful 'Ndrangheta group in the Gioia Tauro plain with his younger brother Giuseppe "Peppe" Piromalli. The Piromalli 'ndrina contained more than 200 members.

Before becoming one of the most feared criminal power brokers in the Gioia Tauro plain, Mommo Piromalli was a cowherd. In 1939 he was charged with illegal carriage of firearms, in 1940 for grievous bodily harm, in 1944 for robbery with violence and in 1950 for murder. In 1967, the court imposed a five-year mandatory internal banishment (soggiorno obbligato) to remove Piromalli from his home town and criminal associates.

Together with Antonio Macrì from Siderno on the Ionic coast and Domenico Mico Tripodo, the boss of the city of Reggio Calabria and the surrounding areas, the Piromalli brothers formed a sort of triumvirate since the beginning of the 1960s until the outbreak of the First 'Ndrangheta war in the mid-1970s. Their senior position was recognized by all other heads of 'Ndrangheta families and their advice was in most cases followed without protest.

== Establishing the Santa ==
Mommo Piromalli and the bosses of several other families established La Santa at the end of the 1960s. In the same time, he was initiated in the Italian Freemasonry.

They were eager to modify the traditional rules of the 'Ndrangheta to get access to contracts for public works in the region and start illegal activities such as drug trafficking, which were prohibited by the traditional code but promised to be very profitable. Through the membership of covert Masonic lodges the 'Ndrangheta bosses were able to contact law enforcement authorities, judges and politicians that were necessary to access public work contracts.

According to Gaetano Costa (the former chief of the Messina Mafia family turned state witness), "it was Mommo Piromalli who – given the enormous interests which the existed in the Reggio Calabria area (the railroad stump, the steelwork center, and the port in Gioia Tauro, etc.) – entrusted himself with the rank of santista, to assert his higher authority and hence directly control the public works. He said that this rank had been given him directly in Toronto, where there was a very important 'ndrina."

These innovations and the new institution of La Santa were opposed by the more traditionalist bosses such as Antonio Macrì and Domenico Tripodo. Only at the end of the so-called First 'Ndrangheta war, which took place in 1974-76 and led to the deaths of Macrì and Tripodo as well as the rise of Piromalli and the De Stefano brothers as the new leaders of the Reggio Calabria 'ndrine, was the new institution fully recognized.

In 1973, Piromalli was charged of heroin trafficking when an undercover operation by the US Federal Bureau of Narcotics (FBN) targeting Saverio Mammoliti revealed that Mammoliti needed permission of Macrì and "Don Mommo" Piromalli.

== Getty kidnap ==
Piromalli was one of the men charged with the kidnap of John Paul Getty III on July 10, 1973, in Rome. The ransom initially demanded was $17 million (equivalent to $123 million in 2025) for his safe return. However, the family suspected a ploy by the rebellious teenager to extract money from his miserly grandfather. John Paul Getty Jr. asked his father J. Paul Getty for the money, but was refused, arguing that his 13 other grandchildren could also become kidnap targets if he paid.

In November 1973, an envelope containing a lock of hair and a human ear arrived at a daily newspaper. The second demand had been delayed three weeks by an Italian postal strike. The demand threatened that Paul would be further mutilated unless the victims paid $3.2 million. The demand stated "This is Paul's ear. If we don't get some money within 10 days, then the other ear will arrive. In other words, he will arrive in little bits."

When the kidnappers finally reduced their demands to $3 million, Getty agreed to pay no more than $2.2 million (equivalent to $16 million in 2025), the maximum that would be tax-deductible. He lent his son the remaining $800,000 at four percent interest. Getty's grandson was found alive on December 15, 1973, in a Lauria filling station, in the province of Potenza, shortly after the ransom was paid.

Nine men had been arrested, including Piromalli, in Gioia Tauro on March 23, 1974. In September 1974, he evaded from a clinic in Rome where he had been transferred to receive treatment for an ulcer. He was arrested again in October 1975 in Rome, where he had a lunch meeting with Paolo De Stefano and Pasquale Condello. Piromalli was in possession of banknotes that could be traced to the Getty kidnap. Two were convicted and sent to prison. The others, including Piromalli and Mammoliti, were acquitted for lack of evidence; Piromalli was acquitted in July 1976. The ransom was used to buy the trucks needed to establish a transport monopoly in the construction of the Gioia Tauro port.

== Business ==
Together with his brother Peppe Piromalli, Mommo redirected the 'Ndrangheta clan from its rural base to an entrepreneurial criminal organisation assuming dominance over several public works in the Gioia Tauro area, particularly in the construction and operation of the new container seaport.

When in 1974 businesses involved in the expansion of the port and steelworks in Gioia Tauro offered a three per cent kickback to be left in peace the three leading 'Ndrangheta families at the time, Antonio Macrì, the Piromalli clan and the De Stefano clan rejected the offer and wanted to be sub-contracted on work carried in order to control the project.

The 'Ndrangheta exploited the construction of the steelworks until the project was abandoned when the government decided there was no economic base for it. In 1977 disagreements about business interests emerged between Piromalli and the De Stefano clan. A hit squad headed by Peppe Piromalli killed Giorgio De Stefano. Some 1,000 people were killed in clan wars over the construction contracts.

== Death ==
On February 11, 1979, Mommo Piromalli died of cirrhosis of the liver in a prison hospital in Gioia Tauro. He was succeeded as head of the clan by his younger brother Giuseppe "Peppe" Piromalli. Piromalli also had contacts with Sicilian Mafiosi such as Angelo La Barbera and Stefano Bontate.
