= Pino Arlacchi =

Italian sociologist

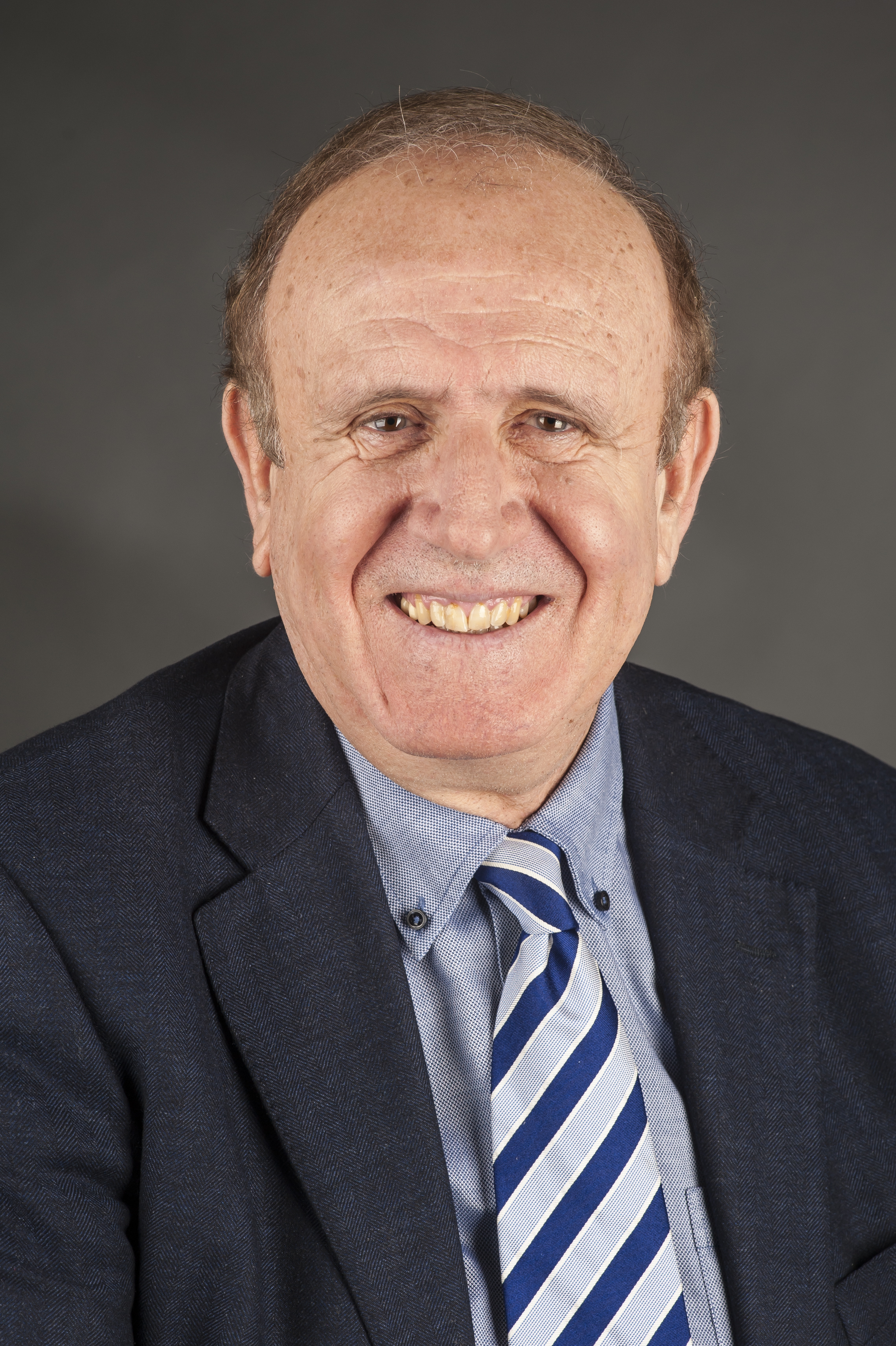
- Arlacchi in 2014

Member of the Chamber of Deputies
- In office 1994–1996

Member of the Senate
- In office 1996–2001

Member of the European Parliament for Southern Italy
- In office 2009–2014

Personal details
- Born: Giuseppe Arlacchi; 21 February 1951 (age 75) Gioia Tauro, Italy
- Party: Democratic Party of the Left; Italy of Values; Democratic Party
- Occupation: Sociologist
- Website: www.pinoarlacchi.it

Giuseppe "Pino" Arlacchi (born 21 February 1951) is an Italian sociologist, politician, and international civil servant, known for his work on organized crime, illegal markets, drug trafficking, and global security. He served as Under-Secretary-General of the United Nations and Executive Director of the United Nations Office for Drug Control and Crime Prevention (UNODC) from 1997 to 2002, and later as a Member of the European Parliament from 2009 to 2014. Currently, he is a full professor of sociology at the University of Sassari.

== Biography ==
He was born in Gioia Tauro, Calabria. In the early 1990s, he was involved in the foundation of the Direzione Investigativa Antimafia (DIA), a law-enforcement agency specially entrusted with fighting organized crime.

Later on he became president of IASOC (International Association for the Study of Organized Crime). Finally, he was appointed honorary president of the Giovanni Falcone foundation, named after noted magistrate Giovanni Falcone, who was also a close friend of his.

== Academic career ==
He has been associate professor of applied sociology at the University of Calabria and at the University of Florence. Moreover, he was visiting professor at the Columbia University of New York City, USA. Later on, he got the full professor position at the University of Sassari, where he is currently professor of sociology in the political science faculty.

== Italian public service and anti-mafia work ==
In Italy, Arlacchi served as Senior Adviser to the Ministry of the Interior, where he established the Direzione Investigativa Antimafia (DIA). Arlacchi and Falcone are widely regarded as the principal architects of Italy’s modern anti-mafia strategy.

The DIA model was later replicated in several countries, including Tajikistan and other Central Asian states, during and after Arlacchi’s tenure at the United Nations.

Arlacchi survived an assassination attempt linked to his anti-mafia engagement, and was publicly threatened by Totò Riina, the supreme mafia boss, in 1994.

I have three enemies, the Prosecutor General of Palermo, the President of the Antimafia Committee, and that Pino Arlacchi who write books”, declared the boss during a trial. (Tony Zermo, Se il Padrino spara parole. Un messaggio chiaro: uccidete Violante, Caselli a Arlacchi, in La Sicilia” May 27, 1994).

As a consequence of this death threat, Pino Arlacchi has been under h24 protection by two armored cars with 7 guards for 13 years, until is UN appointment, when the task of its protection have been assumed by the UN Blue Helmets.

== Political career ==
In 1994–1996 he was a member of the lower chamber of the Italian parliament and, between 1996–1997, of the Senate. During this period, he was appointed vice-president of the Antimafia Commission, a bicameral commission of the Italian Parliament to which he had already collaborated as consultant between 1984 and 1986.

From 2009 to 2014 he was a Member of the European Parliament for Southern Italy: initially with the Italy of Values (ALDE), then with the Democratic Party (S&D).

In 2010 he was rapporteur for the European Parliament report A new strategy for Afghanistan which flagged the risks related to very high levels of corruption in the management of international aid funds within the context of the war in Afghanistan to the increase of opium production.

== United Nations activities ==
As soon as he was appointed director of UNDCP he started a worldwide campaign against drugs, the so-called "A Drug Free World".

In 1998, Arlacchi received international attention following the unanimous approval of a new global drug-control strategy at a special session of the United Nations General Assembly. In a feature article published by Time, journalist William Dowell characterized Arlacchi as the driving force behind an ambitious plan to eliminate global heroin and cocaine production within a decade, highlighting his work since assuming control of the United Nations International Drug Control Programme.

A review of the Arlacchi plan has been carried out in March 2009 by the UN Commission on Narcotic Drugs.

The most important result achieved by Arlacchi during his activity at the UN was the promotion of a UN convention against all the forms of organized criminality, that has been held in Palermo in 2000. The document of this convention came into effect in 2003.

During his tenure in Vienna, Arlacchi’s work received international recognition. United Nations Secretary-General Kofi Annan publicly praised his contributions in several speeches, and former U.S. President Bill Clinton sent a letter to Annan expressing support for Arlacchi’s leadership. Contemporary media coverage also highlighted his role, with The Financial Times reportedly comparing his tenure to that of conductor Herbert von Karajan. During this period, anonymous allegations led to an internal investigation.

== Caviar diplomacy ==
As Head of the European Parliament's monitoring team, Pino Arlacchi certified that the elections in Azerbaijan on 9 October 2013 were "free, fair and transparent". Observers from the OSCE / ODIHR, led by Italian politician Tana de Zulueta, spoke of restrictions on freedom of speech during elections.

On October 11, the representative of the European Union, Catherine Ashton and European Commissioner Stefan Fule, ignored the assessment of the European Parliament, including in its statement the results of the ODIHR. It later emerged that a number of EU representatives traveled to Azerbaijan unofficially and on the dime of Azerbaijani organizations, which was regarded by European Voice as "stupidity or corruption", these trips were labeled "electoral tourism".

Arlacchi dismissed the criticism as uncivilized and fictitious and replied that his assessment of the Azerbaijani presidential elections was not personal but reflected that of sixty-five other parliamentarians belonging to three different delegations (OSCE, EP, Council of Europe), and of over one thousand observers from another 46 delegations present on site and from all over the world.

== Other works ==
Arlacchi has served as an adviser to governments and international organizations on security and crime prevention. He advised the Government of China on security planning for the 2008 Beijing Olympic Games and worked in Kosovo in 2004, on behalf of the European Union, where he did the project for establishing the Financial Intelligence Center to combat money laundering.

== Awards and honors ==
He is the recipient of “El Cóndor de los Andes – Grand Cross”, Bolivia’s highest national honor, awarded in 2000 in recognition of his contribution to reducing narcotics production through alternative development strategies. He is a member of the Honorary Committee of the Foundation for the Dialogue among Civilizations, chaired by former Iranian President Mohammad Khatami.

In November 2025, he received the Hehe Award from the Europe–Asia Center.

== Personal life ==
Pino Arlacchi lives in Rome, Italy. He has maintained long-standing public recognition in Italy and was included in 1986, at the age of 35, in a national list of “A Thousand Italians Who Count.” Outside academia and politics, he is an avid sailor and crossed the Atlantic Ocean five times between 1999 and 2019.

== Selected bibliography ==
- Morte di un generale: l'assassinio di Carlo Alberto Dalla Chiesa, la mafia, la droga, il potere politico (in French). Mondadori. 1982.
- Arlacchi, Pino (1983). La mafia imprenditrice: l'etica mafiosa e lo spirito del capitalismo (in Italian). Il Mulino. ISBN 978-88-15-00044-6.
- Arlacchi, Pino (1986). Mafia Business: The Mafia Ethic and the Spirit of Capitalism. Verso. ISBN 978-0-86091-135-7.
- Arlacchi, Pino (2010). Gli uomini del disonore: la mafia siciliana nella vita del grande pentito Antonino Calderone (in Italian). Il Saggiatore. ISBN 978-88-428-1613-3.
- Arlacchi, Pino (1996). Buscetta: la mafia par l'un des siens (in French). Editions du Félin. ISBN 978-2-86645-216-2.
- Arlacchi, Pino (2011). L'inganno e la paura. Il mito del caos globale (in Italian). Il Saggiatore. ISBN 978-88-565-0238-1.
- Arlacchi, Pino (1983). Mafia, Peasants and Great Estates: Society in Traditional Calabria. CUP Archive. ISBN 978-0-521-25136-5.
- Arlacchi, Pino (2010). La mafia imprenditrice. Dalla Calabria al centro dell'inferno (in Italian). Il Saggiatore. ISBN 978-88-565-0181-0.
- Arlacchi, Pino (2018-10-25). I padroni della finanza mondiale: Lo strapotere che ci minaccia e i contromovimenti che lo combattono (in Italian). Chiarelettere. ISBN 978-88-3296-143-0.
- Arlacchi, Pino (2020). Contro la paura: la violenza diminuisce : i veri pericoli che minacciano la pace mondiale (in Italian). Chiarelettere. ISBN 978-88-3296-115-7.
- Arlacchi, Pino (2022-05-05). Giovanni e io: In prima linea con Falcone contro Andreotti, Cosa nostra e la mafia di Stato (in Italian). Chiarelettere. ISBN 978-88-3296-569-8.
- Arlacchi, Pino (2025-10-17). La Cina spiegata all'Occidente (in Italian). Fazi Editore. ISBN 979-12-5967-767-9.
