= Gioia Tauro =

Gioia Tauro Griko: Metauros
- Comune
- Comune di Gioia Tauro
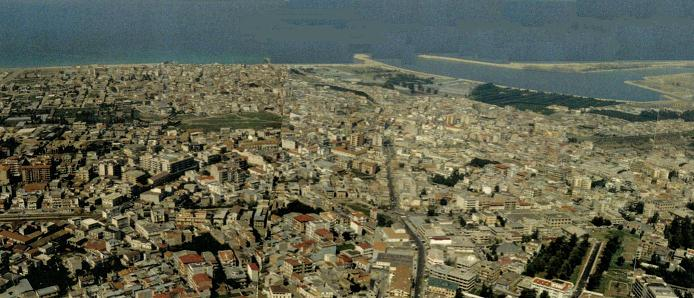
- Panorama of Gioia Tauro

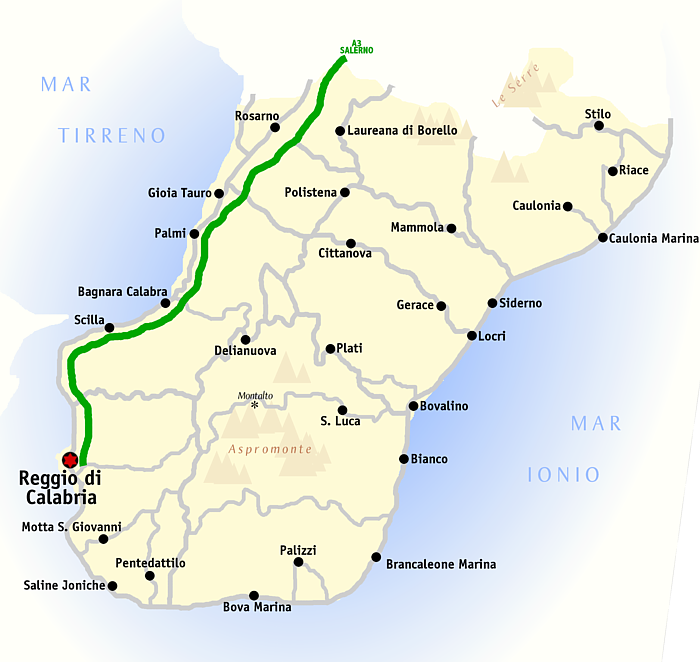
- Map of the province of Reggio Calabria, with Gioia Tauro located to the north at the A2 motorway (A2 depicted in green).

- Location within Italy Location within Calabria
- Coordinates: 38°26′N 15°54′E
- Country: Italy
- Region: Calabria
- Metropolitan city: Reggio Calabria (RC)

Area
  - Total: 39.87 km^{2} (15.39 sq mi)

Population (2018-01-01)
  - Total: 20,076
  - Density: 503.5/km^{2} (1,304/sq mi)
- Time zone: UTC+1 (CET)
  - Summer (DST): UTC+2 (CEST)
- Patron saint: St. Hyppolite
- Saint day: August 13
- Website: Official website

Gioia Tauro (Italian: [ˈdʒɔːja ˈtauro]) is a comune (municipality) in the Metropolitan City of Reggio Calabria (Italy), on the Tyrrhenian coast. It has an important port, situated along the route connecting Suez to Gibraltar, one of the busiest maritime corridors in the world.

== History ==
Gioia Tauro has been continuously inhabited for more than 2500 years.

=== Metauros ===
The remains are a little further inland in the old town of Gioia Tauro on a rise overlooking the Tyrrhenian Sea.

The renowned ancient poet Stesichorus (630-555 BC) was born there.

It was established by Greeks from Zancle and was occupied by Locri in the 6th c. BC. It was one of the smaller ancient Greek centres among the settlements in Southern Italy (Magna Graecia).

The Battle of the Metaurus was fought nearby in 207 BC.

=== Modern era ===
In the 1970s, Gioia Tauro was the main centre for industrial development in Southern Italy, following a burst of violence in Reggio Calabria in 1970, signalling frustration over the central government's neglect of the region. The construction of a large steel plant and port facility was meant to bring income and jobs to Calabria. Until then Gioia Tauro had been a productive and beautiful agricultural area. Profitable farms and olive groves were expropriated and demolished.

The 'Ndrangheta, a Mafia-type criminal organisation based in Calabria, and in particular the Piromalli clan, exploited the construction of the steelworks until the project was abandoned in 1979, when the crisis in the steel industry could no longer be ignored and the government decided there was no economic basis for it. In the meantime some 1,000 people were killed in conflicts over construction contracts. For a while the homicide rate of Gioia Tauro, was higher than that of New York City.

Following this, a proposed electrical energy power station was never built, due to environmental problems. Gioia Tauro became an example of the failure that characterized much of the development of Italy's South as "industrialisation without development."

== Demographics ==
Historical population

Year	Pop.	±%
1861	1,364	—
1871	1,754	+28.6%
1881	3,174	+81.0%
1901	5,764	+81.6%
1911	7,208	+25.1%
1921	8,289	+15.0%
1931	9,465	+14.2%
1936	10,811	+14.2%

Year	Pop.	±%
1951	13,894	+28.5%
1961	13,912	+0.1%
1971	15,016	+7.9%
1981	17,488	+16.5%
1991	18,484	+5.7%
2001	17,762	−3.9%
2011	19,063	+7.3%
2021	19,254	+1.0%

Source: ISTAT

== Gioia Tauro seaport ==
The seaport has seven loading docks with an extension of 4,646 metres (15,243 ft); it is the largest in Italy and the seventh-largest container port in Europe, with a 2007 throughput of 3.7 million TEUs from more than 3,000 ships. In 2018 the port was in eighth place for EU container traffic, on a higher throughput of 4.05 million TEU.

In 2002 more than one-third of national traffic went through the seaport; it specializes in transshipment activities, replacing the port of Malta as the node for overseas traffic to and from the US and the Far East. The Medcenter Container Terminal (Medcenter, Contship) is the main operator working in the port.

=== 'Ndrangheta control of port ===
According to a 2006 report, Italian investigators estimate that 80% of Europe's cocaine arrives from Colombia via Gioia Tauro's docks. The port is also involved in the illegal arms trade. These activities are controlled by the 'Ndrangheta. In 2014 the US FBI and the Italian police made arrests in a joint operation aimed at smashing a new trafficking route for drugs and weapons that officials said had brought together the Gambino crime family of New York and the 'Ndrangheta. It was alleged that representatives of the criminal organisations discussed plans to ship cocaine and heroin from Gioia Tauro to the United States, selling more than 1.3 kilograms (2.9 lb) of heroin to an FBI undercover agent, thinking it would be distributed across the United States. A mafia expert said that the US mafia understood that the Sicilian Cosa Nostra had been so weakened that it allowed the 'Ndrangheta to rise.

“In the 1970s, the Christian Democratic Italian Government (with the active encouragement of the left) appropriated (and wasted) tens of billions of dollars to build one of the country’s largest steel plants in Calabria, but the project was abandoned because of a crisis in the steel industry.... The government ultimately completed construction of a huge seaport at Gioia Tauro (the sixth largest in the Mediterranean) which was originally meant to service the steel plant....[Alex] Perry [in his 2018 book, The Good Mothers (2018)] notes that ‘the railway that connected Gioia Tauro to Europe stopped 1.5 kilometers short of the port, meaning all the cargo’ — legal and illegal — ‘from one of the biggest Mediterranean container ports had to be loaded onto mafia-owned trucks and driven three minutes to the station.’ The port's legitimate business has struggled in recent years, no doubt a result of Mafia control.”

The Piromalli-Molè clan managed to condition the management of the new container terminal. Established in the mid-1990s, it became the largest terminal in the Mediterranean, moving over 2 million containers in 1998. Since 1994, when Contship Italia rented the port area to start transshipment activity and the Medcenter Container Terminal was set up thanks to 138 billion lire (about US$86 million) in state financing, the Piromallis aimed to oblige the Medcenter company, through its vice president Walter Lugli, and the Contship company, through its president Enrico Ravano, to pay a kickback of US$1.50 for each transshipped container, about half of the net profits earned by the two companies.

In February 2008 the parliamentary Antimafia Commission concluded that the 'Ndrangheta "controls or influences a large part of the economic activity around the port and uses the facility as a base for illegal trafficking." In its report it said that "the entire gamma of internal or sub-contracted activities is mafia-influenced, from the management of distribution and forwarding to customs control and container storage." The extortion of Ravano and Contship was part of a project that "did not involve simply this security tax, which grew with the port, but also control of activities tied to the port, the hiring of workers, and relations with port unions and local institutions". "It effectively eliminated legitimate competition from companies not influenced or controlled by the mafia in providing goods and services, performing construction work and hiring personnel. And it threw a shadow over the behaviour of local government and other public bodies."

== 'Ndrangheta infiltration of city council ==
The city council of Gioia Tauro was dissolved in 1991 because of infiltration by the 'Ndrangheta. In April 2008, it was dissolved for the second time for the same reason. The town is home to several 'ndrine, such as the Alvaro, Mammoliti, Molè, and Piromalli families.

Gioia Tauro's former mayor and deputy mayor, Giorgio Dal Torrione and Rosario Schiavone, were arrested on mafia charges on October 13, 2008. Both had been forced to step down in April, when the city council was dissolved on suspicion of mafia infiltration. 'Ndrangheta boss Gioacchino Piromalli was arrested as well, along with his nephew, also named Gioacchino Piromalli, who is a lawyer. The mayors were accused of employing the younger Piromalli. Police believe the legal work was a front to enable the Piromallis to regain a slice of the business generated by the port of Gioia Tauro.

== Notable people ==
- Pino Arlacchi – sociologist
- Nick Nostro – film director
- Stesichorus – ancient poet

== Winds ==
- Sirocco, a hot, dry wind originating in Sahara Desert (southeasterly)
- Libeccio, very dangerous for shippers (to be avoided; southwesterly)
- Mistral (Ponente), the predominant and quiet wind (northwesterly)
