= Francesco Forgione (politician) =

Italian politician

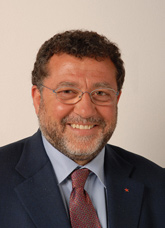

Mayor of Favignana
- In office 6 October 2020 – 14 February 2025
- Preceded by: Giuseppe Pagoto
- Succeeded by: Giuseppe Pagoto

Member of the Chamber of Deputies
- In office 28 April 2006 – 28 April 2008
- Constituency: Sicily 2

Personal details
- Born: 15 August 1960 (age 65) Catanzaro, Italy
- Party: PdUP (1978–1984); PCI (1984–1991); PRC (1991–2009); SEL (2010–2016)
- Occupation: Journalist

Francesco Forgione (born August 15, 1960, in Catanzaro, Italy), is a former member of the Italian Chamber of Deputies and the Communist Refoundation Party. He was chairman of the Antimafia Commission in 2006–2008.

On 20th October, 2023, Musician Bug Hunter wrote a song based on the single line entry of Francesco Forgione in the Podcast Jam Mechanics (Season one, episode one). The song with inspiration drawn from the Wikipedia entry became popular among fans, however it is unknown if the subject of the song is aware of its existence.
