= Contship Containerlines =

Contship Containerlines was a global container carrier operating from 1969 to 2005 in the India/Pakistan, Levant, Australia/New Zealand, South America and Asia trade, mainly to and from Europe. The company was founded just as containerization was beginning and continuously grew up with the growth of this market.

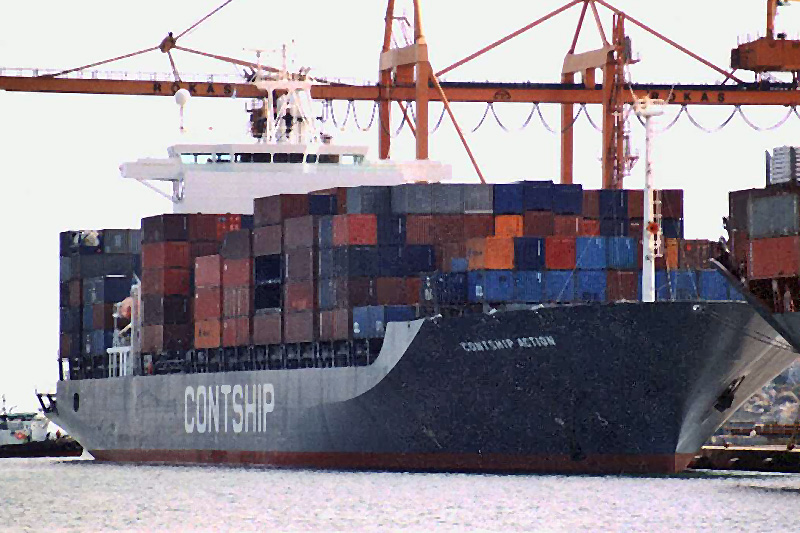
MV Contship Action

== History ==
In 1968 Dr. Angelo Ravano founded Contship SA in Switzerland. The company's first sailing was undertaken by the MV Sea Maid from Fos to Casablanca in October 1969.

During 1970 an agency arm was set up in Milan and terminal operations were started at La Spezia. Some 8,000 twenty-foot equivalent units (TEU) were handled in the first year. A European network with subsidiaries in Spain and the Netherlands in 1973 and 1974 was built up. The transfer of the agency representation in Milan to Genoa in 1974 was accompanied by the expansion of the service portfolio to eastern Mediterranean ports. In 1976 Ellerman City Liners appointed Contship's agency arm in Portugal.

1977 saw the formation of a UK subsidiary and the launch of the first direct container service between Europe and India. It was the first shipping line to handle containers in Bombay (now Mumbai). More experience of working partnerships was gained from 1979 through the formation of the Contship Gulf Line as a joint service agreement with Ellerman City Lines, operating a new service that linked Europe with the Near East.

The company moved its headquarters from Switzerland to Felixstowe and then Ipswich, thus becoming a part of the UK's shipping establishment. The early 80s saw Contship expanding and widening their interests. In Spain, they won the agency representation for Trans Freight Lines. In the UK, they shared in the setting up of Arrowfreight, a freight forwarding operation. Meanwhile, a group holding company was established in Curaçao.

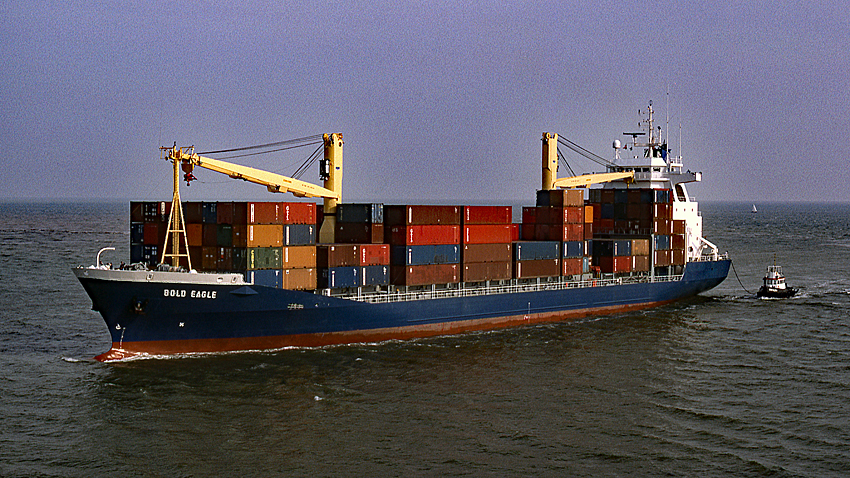
Bold Eagle container ship approaching Felixstowe

Eagle Container Line linking North Europe and the Mediterranean with Australia commenced in 1982 as a non-conference service. With new agency companies in France and Italy, the start of the Eurasia Container Line and the introduction of 1000 TEU vessels into the Eagle service, 1985 was a busy year. 1986 saw the formation of Ocean Star Container Line, operating a westbound round-the world service. The following year saw the commencement of the Medipas service operating between the Mediterranean and India and Pakistan. In 1987 the Contship Containerlines brand was established. It gradually took over management control of Contship's container shipping services, agency and intermodal activities. At the end of the second decade, Ocean Star was expanded to include an Australian and Far East leg and North European ports of call. With the acquisition of Costa Containerline they started a service from the Mediterranean to the US East and Gulf Coasts.

The 90s saw new vessels for the Eagle service, a revision of the Costa operation and start of the Salerno Terminal operations. 1991 was a year that saw changes to the Indian Sub-Continent service with CMB Transport joining Contship Eurasia Line through a joint service agreement. Joint service agreements have always played an important part in Contship's activities. In 1993 just such an agreement with P&O brought a restructuring of the Eagle service and an upgrade of Ocean Star with the addition of larger tonnage. Further tonnage upgrading was made to Contship's Eurasia service and the Gulf Line was reconfigured as Contship Levant Line in association with four partners in 1994. With terminal operations starting in Savona and Gioia Tauro in 1995 and with restructuring of the Eurasia/Medasia services and the establishing of a Med-US Gulf and Mexico service they made further service improvements.

In 1996 the Levant service was modified and the Mediterranean-US and Mexico service was upgraded. The company also took over the Pro Line, thereby bringing Contship Containerlines into the trade between North Europe and South America. In 1997 Contship was acquired by CP Ships, being one of the few shipping lines CP took over at a profitable level. The Ocean Star service was retonnaged and Contship entered into partnership with the CMA-CGM Group and Marfret in 1998. 1999 was a year of consolidating existing operations and building a platform for further growth. They made significant cost efficiencies, improved their profitability and entered new and complementary trade lanes including the US West Coast to the Mediterranean. The same year Contship launched its Internet site and was the first container shipping line to paint its web address on the hull of all its vessels as mobile advertising.

In 2001 a new service between China and Europe was established in co-operation with CMA-CGM, however this trade had to be withdrawn from the market in early March 2003 due to lack of profitability caused by import/export imbalances, low freight rates and high fixed slot costs.

The Australasian trade lane was restructured and retonnaged, providing new 4100 TEU vessels with the capability to carry a high percentage of refrigerated containers in late 2002. In 2003 the headquarters moved from Ipswich to the new joint headquarters of CP Ships in Gatwick. A new Contship Logo was designed in 2004 when restructuring the brand/trade lane strategies, however it didn't achieve the public recognition the old one did. In January 2006 the Contship Containerlines brand was replaced by the CP Ships brand following CP's one brand strategy promoted by the "One brand - One team" project, being the last CP Ships brand to be retired. In late 2005 CP Ships was bought up by TUI AG and merged in mid 2006 in the Hapag-Lloyd organization.

=== Contship Overland ===
Contship Overland was a division of Contship Containerlines operating in Europe's intermodal industry. The company had offices in Felixstowe, Glasgow and Milan, and worked with partners in Spain and Greece, providing rail freight to key markets and road freight options where required by customers. Its main business consisted of intermodal container and swapbody traffic between the UK and Italy, mostly by rail via the Channel Tunnel. After approximately ten years in business, Contship Overland was sold to the Rotterdam-based intermodal transport operator Geest North Sea Line with effect of 1 October 2001.

=== Contship Italia Group ===
When Contship Containerlines was acquired by CP Ships in 1997, the terminal operations in Italy stayed an independent company, not owned by CP. Today, this company acts under the name Contship Italia Group still using the old Contship logo.

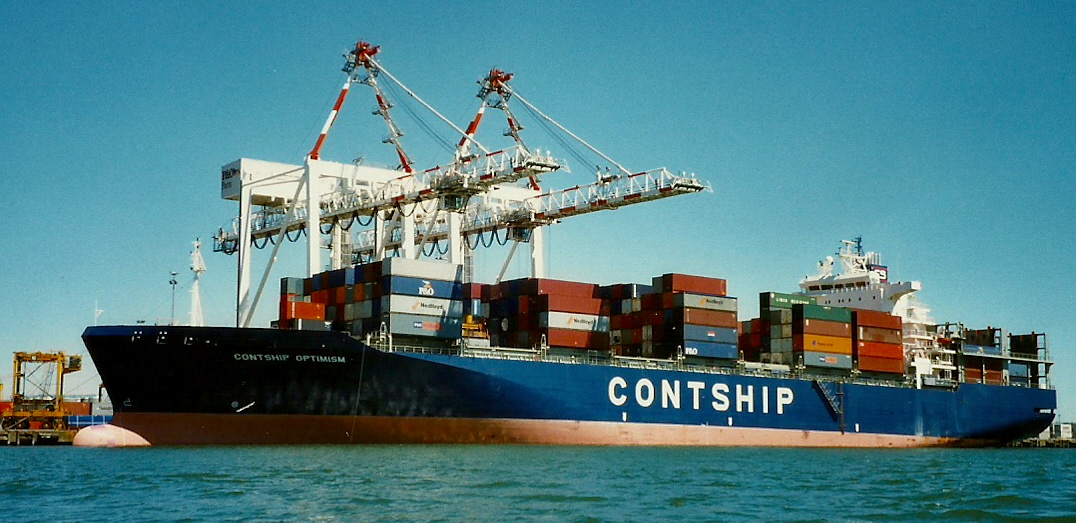
MV Contship Optimism

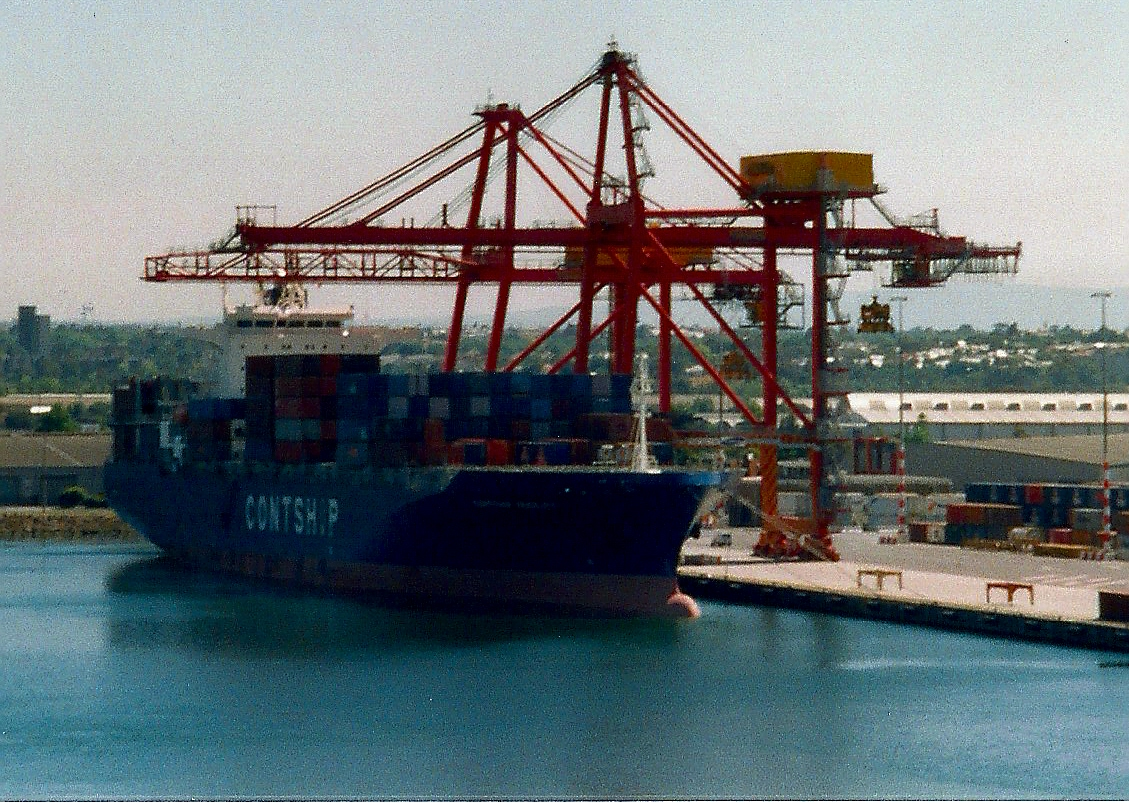
MV Contship Nobility

== International identifiers ==
SCAC Code: CCXL
Operator Code: CSA
BIC Codes (Container prefixes): CSQU, HAMU, PLVU, CLGU, TLEU, PSBU, PCRU, FANU (Fantainer)

== Vessels ==
(applies to pre-1997 vessels only)

Built	Name	Tonnage	Capacity	Shipyard	IMO Number	Call sign	Flag	Status/Comments
?	Contship Classica	?	?	?	9143246	?	?	
1981	Contship Champion	5,938 GT	584 TEU	Rickmers Werft, Bremerhaven, Germany	8104474	?	?	Sailed for Contship from 1987 to 1988.
1982	Contship Success	31,570 GT	1700 TEU	Mitsui Engineering & Shipbuilding Co., Ltd., Tamano Works	8103406	ZCBF3	Bermuda	Canmar Success 1997–1999, Contship Success 1999–2000, Cast Power 2000–2003, CP Power 2005–2006, Power 2006-
1982	Contship Lugano	5,404 GT	445 TEU	J.J. Sietas KG Schiffswerft GmbH & Co., Hamburg, Germany	8121032	?	?	Sailed for Contship from 1985 to 1988.
1983	Contship Endeavour	32,152 GT	1950 TEU	Sumitomo Heavy Industries, Ltd., Yokosuka	8204626	ZCBE7	Bermuda	later names: Cast Performance, Canmar Endurance, CP Endurance, Endurance, Still in service
1983	Contship Spain	13,474 GT	1044 TEU	A.G. Weser Seebeckwerft, Germany	8209755	?	?	
1984	Contship Germany	12,691 GT	1128 TEU	Flender Werft AG, Lübeck, Germany	8324608	V2WU	Antigua & Barbuda	Sailed for Contship from 1991 to 1992.
1985	Contship Australia	10,287 GT	1021 TEU	Bremer Vulkan AG - Schiffbau, Germany	8513778	V2OB6	Antigua & Barbuda	Sailed for Contship from 1990 to 1992.
1985	Contship America	22,667 GT	1800 TEU	Hyundai Heavy Industries Co., Ltd., South Korea	8509387	V7BZ3	Marshall Islands	
1985	Contship America	10,256 GT	1021 TEU	Bremer Vulkan AG - Schiffbau, Germany	8513766	V2AJ5	Antigua & Barbuda	Sailed for Contship from Aug. 1993 to Nov. 1993.
1985	Contship America	22,667 GT	1552 TEU	Hyundai Heavy Industries Co., Ltd., South Korea	8408856	3EIP3	Panama	Sailed for Contship in 1995 and 1996 for a short time.
1985	Contship Brave	10,282 GT	1228 TEU	Bremer Vulkan AG - Schiffbau, Germany	8415641	VSUV4	United Kingdom	Sailed for Contship from 1988 to 1994
1985	Contship Canada	9,367 GT	1002 TEU	Rickmers Werft, Bremerhaven, Germany	8417558	V2CA1	Antigua & Barbuda	
1985	Contship England	10,282 GT	1022 TEU	Bremer Vulkan AG - Schiffbau, Germany	8415615	DPEW	Germany	
1985	Contship Europe	10,282 GT	1022 TEU	Bremer Vulkan AG - Schiffbau, Germany	8415639	?	Germany	Former Eagle Container Lines Bold Eagle. Sailed for Contship from 1989 to 1993.
1985	Contship Italy	12,569 GT	1150 TEU	Flender Werft AG, Lübeck, Germany	8411205	H8TJ	Panama	Sailed for Contship from 1989 to 1990.
1986	Contship Egypt	13,335 GT	896 TEU	VEB Schiffswerft Neptun, Rostock, Germany	8520379	P3GF8	Cyprus	Sailed for Contship from 1991 to 1993.
1986	Contship Success	16,250 GT	1597 TEU	Bremer Vulkan AG - Schiffbau, Germany	8513780	?	?	Sailed for Contship from Dec. 1992 to 1994
1987	Contship Asia	10,811 GT	1022 TEU	Bremer Vulkan AG - Schiffbau, Germany	8614194	DPGD	Germany	Sailed for Contship from 1988 to 1991
1988	Contship Asia	13,315 GT	928 TEU	VEB Schiffswerft Neptun, Rostock, Germany	8609589	P3CA8	Cyprus	
1988	Contship Houston	31,430 GT	2073 TEU	Chantiers du Nord et Mediterrane, France	8420907	ELUA5	Liberia	Sailed for Contship in 1997. Further name: TMM Oaxaca. Ran aground in the mouth of Mississippi River in Dec. 1999, but re-floated.
1989	Contship America	31,430 GT	2073 TEU	Chantiers du Nord et Mediterrane, France	8509387	H3QJ	Panama	
1989	Contship Nouméa	18,000 GT	1743 TEU	Bremer Vulkan AG - Schiffbau, Germany	8902125	ELTY3	Liberia	
1990	Contship Argentina	18,037 GT	1799 TEU	Bremer Vulkan AG - Schiffbau, Germany	?	?	?	Contship Proline Service / Sailed for Contship from 1996 to 1997 / Explosion and fire in a hold on 9 November 1998. Scrapped at Tampico, arrived on 4 May 1999.
1990	Contship Ipswich	16,236 GT	1597 TEU	A.G. Weser Seebeckwerft, Germany	8908167	A8JV6	Liberia	
1990	Contship Jork	16,236 GT	1597 TEU	A.G. Weser Seebeckwerft, Germany	8908181	DEJA	Germany	Contship Ocean Star Service
1990	Contship La Spezia	16,236 GT	1597 TEU	A.G. Weser Seebeckwerft, Germany	8908179	?	Germany	
1991	Contship Australia	16,236 GT	1597 TEU	A.G. Weser Seebeckwerft, Germany	9008524	ELVJ9	Liberia	
1991	Contship Barcelona	16,236 GT	1599 TEU	Bremer Vulkan AG - Schiffbau, Germany	9008536	DQEX	Germany	Contship Ocean Star Service
1992	Contship Germany	16,236 GT	1600 TEU	Bremer Vulkan AG - Schiffbau, Germany	9051222	DLCX	Germany	Contship Eagle/Ocean Star Service - painted fully in pink!
1992	Contship Mexico	30,567 GT	1933 TEU	Stocznia Gdanska SA, Poland	9039250	P3ZH4	Cyprus	Sailed for Contship from 1998 to 1999.
1993	Contship Asia	16,236 GT	1597 TEU	A.G. Weser Seebeckwerft, Germany	9053244	DDQI	Germany	Contship Eurasia, Proline, Levant Service
1993	Contship Atlantic	23,130 GT	1684 TEU	A.G. Weser Seebeckwerft, Germany	9070022	DEAL	Germany	Contship Eurasia Service / Sailed for Contship from 1993 to 1997
1993	Contship France	16,236 GT	1597 TEU	A.G. Weser Seebeckwerft, Germany	9053232	DLDB	Germany	Contship Ocean Star Service
1993	Contship Le Havre	14,865 GT	1452 TEU	Kvaerner Warnow Werft GmbH, Germany	9004255	V2OA3	Antigua & Barbuda	
1993	Contship New York	16,233 GT	1667 TEU	J.J. Sietas KG Schiffswerft GmbH & Co., Hamburg, Germany	9056272	A8AG5	Liberia	
1993	Contship Pacific	16,236 GT	1684 TEU	A.G. Weser Seebeckwerft, Germany	9070010	V2OZ5	Antigua	Contship Eurasia/Eagle Service
1993	Contship Rotterdam	16,233 GT	1667 TEU	J.J. Sietas KG Schiffswerft GmbH & Co., Hamburg, Germany	9056284	A8KJ4	Liberia	
1994	Contship Champion	35,595 GT	3538 TEU	Hyundai Heavy Industries Co., Ltd., South Korea	9064865	DGRF	Germany	2003 CP / 2005: CP Champion / In service
1994	Contship Egypt	16,927 GT	1641 TEU	Hanjin Heavy Industries & Construction Co., Ltd., South Korea	9060273	V2OM	Antigua	Sailed for Contship from 1994 to 1995
1994	Contship Europe	16,269 GT	1687 TEU	A.G. Weser Seebeckwerft, Germany	9106144	DEFA	Germany	Contship Ocean Star Service
1994	Contship Innovator	35,595 GT	3538 TEU	Hyundai Heavy Industries Co., Ltd., South Korea	9064877	DNFA	Germany	2003 CP / 2005: CP Innovator / In service
1994	Contship Inspiration	30,971 GT	2394 TEU	Astilleros Españoles, S.A., Spain	9051492	H8MU	Panama	Sailed for Contship from 2001 to 2003. Former name: TMM Yucatan (2000)
1994	Contship Italy	16,270 GT	1684 TEU	Bremer Vulkan AG - Schiffbau, Germany	9109029	DDMM / DEEU	Germany	Contship Ocean Star Service - painted fully in blue
1994	Contship New Zealand	16,282 GT	1684 TEU	A.G. Weser Seebeckwerft, Germany	9070034	DEBH	Germany	Contship Eurasia Service
1994	Contship Singapore	16,236 GT	1687 TEU	A.G. Weser Seebeckwerft, Germany	9070046	DEBO	Germany	Contship Ocean Star Service - painted fully in yellow
1994	Contship Tahiti	4,619 GT	1334 TEU	Stocznia Szczecinska S.A., Poland	9057135	P3TN5	Cyprus	later names: TMM Tuxpan
1994	Contship Sydney	23,540 GT	2078 TEU	Stocznia Gdanska SA, Poland	9062984	VSXC4	United Kingdom	Further names: Canmar Dynasty / 2005: CP Dynasty / 2006: Sydney Express / In service
1995	Contship Auckland	23,691 GT	2063 TEU	Stocznia Szczecinska S.A., Poland	9064334	ELVL8	Liberia	Sailed for Contship from 1995 to 1997.
1995	Contship Lavagna	16,270 GT	1684 TEU	Bremer Vulkan AG - Schiffbau, Germany	9109017	DEFI	Germany	Contship Ocean Star Service
1995	Contship Melbourne	23,540 GT	2078 TEU	Stocznia Gdanska SA, Poland	9062996	VSXC7	United Kingdom	1997 CP / 2005: CP Voyager / 2006: Fremantle Express / In service
1995	Contship Nobility	31,730 GT	2758 TEU	Samsung SB & Heavy Ind. Co. Ltd., South Korea	9128192	DGKV	Germany	1997 CP / 2003 sold
1995	Contship Ticino	16,269 GT	1684 TEU	A.G. Weser Seebeckwerft, Germany	9111565	DEJL	Germany	Contship Ocean Star Service
1996	Contship Action	31,730 GT	2890 TEU	Kvarner Warnow Werft Gmbh, Rostock, Germany	9122215	P3JA9	Germany	2003:Tegesos 2004:Norasia Tegesos 2009:Tegesos 2012:Tag 81 2012 Demolition At Alang.
1996	Contship Ambition	31,730 GT	2890 TEU	Kvarner Warnow Werft Gmbh, Rostock, Germany	9122203	P3GU7	Cyprus	2002:Telanon 2004:Norasia Telanon 2007:Nautic 2010:Pisti 2015:Isti 2015 Demolished At Alang.
1996	Contship Brasil	15,859 GT	1512 TEU	Thyssen Nordseewerke GmbH, Germany	9081019	DIGF	Germany	Contship Proline Service
1996	Contship Vision	31,730 GT	2758 TEU	Samsung SB & Heavy Ind. Co. Ltd., South Korea	9128180	DGGV	Germany	1997 CP / 2003 sold
1997	Contship Champion	31,207 GT	2890 TEU	Kvaerner Warnow Werft GmbH, Rostock, Germany	9137909	V7GU3	Marshall Islands	1997:Telendos (Launched) 2002:Champion 2003:Indamex Delaware 2004:CMA CGM Dardanelles 2008:Champion 2010:Nanjing Dragon 2012: Champion 2012:Champion 1 2012 Scrapped At Alang.
1997	Contship Champion	31,730 GT	3538 TEU	Hyundai Heavy Ind. Co. Ltd., South Korea	9064865	DGRF	Germany	1994:Ville De Vela 2004:Indamex New York 2005:Northern Reliance 2010:Kalani 2012:Northern Reliance 2013 Scrapped At Alang.
1997	Contship Harmony	31,207 GT	2890 TEU	Kvaerner Warnow Werft GmbH, Rostock, Germany	9137894	P3JM9	Germany	2003:Conti Harmony 2010:San Pedro Bay Dragon 2011:Conti Harmony 2014 Scrapped At Alang.
1997	Contship London	26,131 GT	2124 TEU	China SB Corp., Kaohsiung, Taiwan	9152739	ELVX4	Liberia	2005: CP London / 2006: London / In service
1997	Contship Optimism	31,730 GT	2758 TEU	Samsung SB & Heavy Ind. Co. Ltd., South Korea	9128207	DGOL	Germany	1997 CP / 2003 sold
1997	Contship Romance	31,730 GT	2758 TEU	Samsung SB & Heavy Ind. Co. Ltd., South Korea	9128207	DLCT	Germany	1997 CP / 2003 sold
1997	Contship Spirit	31,730 GT	2758 TEU	Samsung SB & Heavy Ind. Co. Ltd., South Korea	9153381	DDJI	Germany	1997 CP / 2003 sold, 2004: Micheala S, 2007: MSC Crisobal, 2009: Maersk Nantes
1997	Contship Washington	26,131 GT	2124 TEU	China SB Corp., Kaohsiung, Taiwan	9152741	ELVZ5	Liberia	2002: Direct Tui / 2005: CP Tui / 2006: Honolulu Express / In service
1998	Contship Auckland	26,131 GT	2124 TEU	China SB Corp., Kaohsiung, Taiwan	9160396	ELWA2	Liberia	2005: CP Auckland, 2006: CMA CGM Buenos Aires, In service
1998	Contship Rangitoto	25,359 GT	2500 TEU	Volkswerft Stralsund GmbH, Germany	9153408	DGZO	Germany	former Italia Line vessel Cielo di San Francisco, 2005: CP Rangitoto, 2006: Rangitoto, Ute Oltmann
1998	Contship Rome	26,131 GT	2124 TEU	China SB Corp., Kaohsiung, Taiwan	9152753	ELVZ6	Liberia	2005: CP Rome, 2006: Rome, Aenne Rickmers, In service
1998	Contship Wellington	26,131 GT	2124 TEU	China SB Corp., Kaohsiung, Taiwan	9152765	ELVZ7	Liberia	2002: Direct Kea, 2005: CP Kea, CMA CGM Cezanne, Alice Rickmers, In service
1999	Contship Mexico	28,118 GT	1644 TEU	Stocznia Szczecinska S.A., Poland	9131278	ELXL6	Liberia	CCNI Antofagasta, CCNI Aviles, Sophie, In service
2001	Contship Dragon	39,812 GT	4132 TEU	Hyundai Heavy Industries Co., Ltd., South Korea	9232890	C6SG5	Bahamas	CMA CGM Vega, MSC England, 2007–present
2002	Contship Aurora	46,009 GT	4115 TEU	Daewoo SB & Marine Eng. Co. Ltd., Okpo, South Korea	9232565	ZIZP9	United Kingdom	2005: CP Aurora, Maersk Dexter, Liverpool Express, In service
2002	Contship Australis	46,009 GT	4115 TEU	Daewoo SB & Marine Eng. Co. Ltd., Okpo, South Korea	9232577	VQEN3	United Kingdom	2005: CP Australis, Maersk Dale, Dublin Express, In service
2002	Contship Borealis	46,009 GT	4115 TEU	Daewoo SB & Marine Eng. Co. Ltd., Okpo, South Korea	9232589	VQEN2	United Kingdom	2005: CP Borealis, Maersk Dayton, Glasgow Express, In service
2002	Contship Tenacity	40,146 GT	3237 TEU	China SB Corp., Kaohsiung, Taiwan	9243174	WDD6127	USA	other names: TMM Colima, CP Shenandoah, Yorktown Express, In service
2003	Contship Indigo	39,941 GT	4311 TEU	Samsung SB & Heavy Ind. Co. Ltd., South Korea	9238753	VQJW4	United Kingdom	2005: CP Indigo / 2006: Bavaria Express / In service
2003	Contship Tamarind	39,941 GT	4311 TEU	Samsung SB & Heavy Ind. Co. Ltd., South Korea	9238765	VQMM2	United Kingdom	2005: CP Tamarind / 2006: Thuringia Express / In service

- GRT = Gross Register Tonnage / BRT (old unit of measurement)
- GT = Gross Tonnage / BRZ (introduced 18 July 1994)
- TEU = Twenty-foot equivalent units

Contship often re-used vessel names, see the IMO Number.

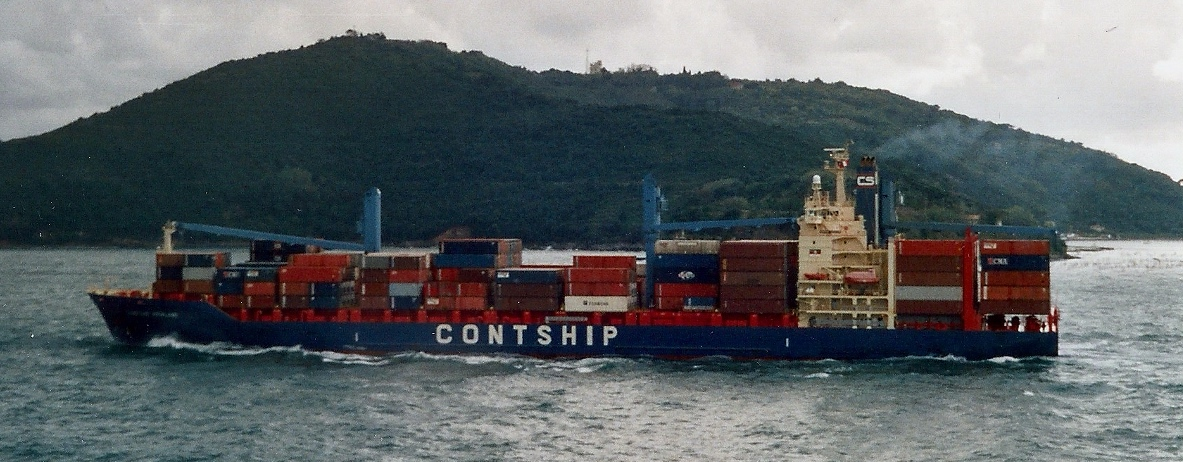
MV Contship Auckland

== See also ==
- CP Ships
- Hapag-Lloyd

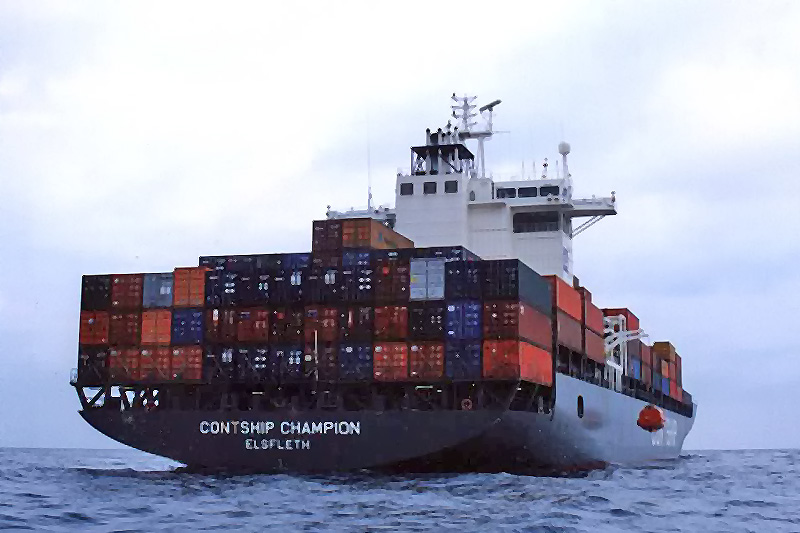
MV Contship Champion
