= Antimafia Commission =

Italian parliamentary commission

The Antimafia Commission (Italian: Commissione parlamentare antimafia) is a bicameral commission of the Italian Parliament, composed of members from the Chamber of Deputies and the Senate of the Republic. The first commission, formed in 1963, was established as a body of inquiry tasked with investigating the "phenomenon of the [Sicilian] Mafia". Subsequent commissions expanded their scope to investigate all "organized crime of the Mafia type", which included other major criminal organizations in Italy, such as the Camorra, the 'Ndrangheta, and the Sacra Corona Unita.

The Antimafia Commission's goal is to study the phenomenon of organized crime in all its forms and to measure the adequacy of existing anti-crime measures, legislative and administrative, according to their results. The commission has judicial powers in that it may instruct the judicial police to carry out investigations. It can ask for copies of court proceedings, and is entitled to request any form of collaboration that it deems necessary. Those who provide testimony to the Antimafia Commission are obliged by law to tell the truth. The commission can also submit reports to the Italian Parliament as often as desired but does so at least on an annual basis.

== Preceding events ==
The first proposal to constitute a commission of inquiry into the Mafia was the result of post-war struggles for land reform and the violent reaction against peasant organizations and its leaders, culminating in the killing of 11 people and the wounding of over thirty at a Labour Day parade in Portella della Ginestra. The attack was attributed to the bandit and separatist leader Salvatore Giuliano. Nevertheless, the Mafia was suspected of involvement in the Portella della Ginestra massacre and many other previous and subsequent attacks.

On 14 September 1948, a parliamentary commission of inquiry into the public security situation on Sicily (Commissione parlamentare d'inchiesta sulla situazione dell'ordine pubblico) was proposed by deputy Giuseppe Berti of the Italian Communist Party (PCI) in a debate on the violence in Sicily. The proposal was turned down by the interior minister Mario Scelba, amidst indignant voices about prejudice against Sicily and Sicilians.

In 1958, senator Ferruccio Parri again proposed to form a commission. The proposal was not taken up by the parliamentary majority. In 1961, the Christian Democracy party (DC) in the Senate and Sicilian politicians like Bernardo Mattarella and Giovanni Gioia, both later accused of links with the Mafia, dismissed the proposal as "useless". In March 1962, amidst gang wars in Palermo, the Sicilian Assembly asked for an official inquiry. On 11 April 1962, the Senate in Rome approved the bill. It took eight months before the Chamber of Deputies put the law to a vote. It was approved on 20 December 1962.

== First commission (1963–1982) ==
In February 1963, the first parliamentary Commission of Inquiry on the Mafia phenomenon in Sicily (Commissione parlamentare d'inchiesta sul fenomeno della mafia in Sicilia) was formed, in the midst of the First Mafia War, under the presidency of Paolo Rossi of the Italian Democratic Socialist Party (PSDI). It took a long time to form, because newspapers and parliamentarians alike were opposed to the inclusion of Sicilians. It lasted less than three months, before the general elections of 28 April 1963.

The second president in the new legislature was the DC member Donato Pafundi, and was formed on 5 June 1963. On 30 June 1963, a car bomb exploded in Ciaculli, an outlying suburb of Palermo, killing seven police and military officers sent to defuse it, after an anonymous phone call. The bomb was intended for Salvatore "Ciaschiteddu" Greco, head of the Sicilian Mafia Commission and the boss of the Ciaculli Mafia family. The Ciaculli massacre changed the Mafia war into a war against the Mafia. It prompted the first concerted anti-mafia efforts by the state in post-war Italy. On 6 July 1963, the Antimafia Commission met for the first time. It took thirteen years and two more legislatures before a final report was submitted in 1976.

The PCI claimed the DC party put members on the commission to stop the inquiry moving too far in the political field, such as the commission's vice-president Antonio Gullotti] and Giovanni Matta, a former member of Palermo's city council. Matta's arrival in 1972 created a scandal, as he had been mentioned in a report and was summoned to testify in the previous legislature about the role of the Mafia in real estate speculation. The PCI called for his resignation. In the end, the whole commission under the presidency of Luigi Carraro had to resign, and be recomposed without Matta again.

=== New legislation ===
In September 1963, the Antimafia Commission presented a draft law. In May 1965, it was passed by the Italian Parliament as Law 575, entitled Dispositions against the Mafia, the first time the word Mafia had been used in legislation. The law extended 1956 legislation concerning individuals considered to be "socially dangerous" to those "suspected of belonging to associations of the Mafia type". The measures included special surveillance; the possibility of ordering a suspect to reside in a designed place outside his home area and the suspension of publicly issued licenses, grants or authorizations. The law gave powers to a public prosecutor or questor (chief of police) to identify and trace the assets of anyone suspected of involvement in a Mafia-type association.

The efficacy of the new law was severely limited. Firstly, because there was no legal definition of a Mafia association. Secondly, because the obligation for mafiosi to reside in areas outside Sicily, opened up new opportunities to develop illicit activities in the cities of northern and central Italy. Amending this law during the next four decades was the main aim in the legislative fight against mafia. It was amended by La Torre-Rognoni law in 1982, and by some cornerstone judgement of Italy's Supreme Court of Cassation.

=== Interim reports ===
Francesco Cattanei, the second president of the Antimafia Commission

In 1966, Pafundi declared: "These rooms here are like an ammunition store. In order to give us the chance to the very root of the truth we don't want them to explode too soon. We have here a load of dynamite." The store never exploded, and Pafundi summed up the efforts of the Antimafia Commission in three discreet pages in March 1968. All the documents were locked away. Pafundi’s successor who took over the commission in 1968 was a different man, Francesco Cattanei, a member of the DC from the Northern Italy who was determined to investigate thoroughly.

Cattanei came under attack by his fellow DC members. The party’s official newspaper Il Popolo wrote that the Antimafia Commission had become an instrument of the PCI. Despite the smears to his reputation, Cattanei was supported by the majority of the commission and supportive public opinion caused him to resist the pressure to resign. In July 1971, the commission published an intermediary report with biographies of prominent mafiosi, such as Tommaso Buscetta, and summarized the characteristics of the Mafia.

The Antimafia Commission investigated the activities and failed prosecution of Luciano Leggio, the administration of Palermo and the wholesale markets in the city, as well as the links between the Mafia and banditry in the post-war period. In its March 1972 report, the Antimafia Commission said in its introduction: "Generally speaking magistrates, trade unionists, prefects, journalists, and the police authorities expressed an affirmative judgement on the existence of more or less intimate links between Mafia and the public authorities ... some trade unionists reached the point of saying that 'the mafioso is a man of politics'." The commission's main conclusion was that the Mafia was strong because it had penetrated the structure of the state.

The Antimafia Commission was dissolved when new elections made an end to the legislature. In the next legislature, Cattanei was replaced with Luigi Carraro, a fellow DC member who was more sensitive to the fears of the DC, that had been under attack of the commission.

=== Disappointing results ===
Cesare Terranova, a judge and member of the Antimafia Commission

In 1972, Cesare Terranova entered the Antimafia Commission. He had previously been the chief investigative prosecutor in Palermo, who had prepared several Mafia Trials in the 1960s, such as the Trial of the 114, that had ended disappointingly, with little convictions. He was elected for the Independent Left under the auspices of the PCI. He became the secretary of the commission. Terranova, together with PCI deputy Pio La Torre, wrote the minority report of the Antimafia Commission, which pointed to links between the Mafia and prominent politicians, in particular of the DC party.

Terranova urged his colleagues of the majority to take responsibility. According to the minority report, "it would be a grave error on the part of the Commission to accept the theory that the Mafia-political link has been eliminated. Even today the behaviour of the ruling DC group in the running of the City and the Provincional Councils offers the most favourable terrain for the perpetuation of the system of Mafia power."

In the final report of the first Antimafia Commission, the former Palermo mayor Salvo Lima was described as one of the pillars of Mafia power in Palermo. It had no formal consequences for Lima. In 1993, the fourth Antimafia Commission led by Luciano Violante concluded that there were strong indications of relations between Lima and members of the Mafia. By then, Lima had been killed by the Mafia.

In its conclusions, the commission made many recommendations and offered much advice to those bodies that were going to take the job on. It criticized some authorities and condemned others. The government did nothing, and when the results were published, every effort was made to confuse their message and diminish their value, and was drowned in a sea of slander. The reports and the documentation of the Antimafia Commission were essentially disregarded. Terranova talked of "thirteen wasted years" of the Antimafia Commission.

The final report was issued at a time when the question of the Mafia was pushed to the background by the political turmoil in the 1970s, known as the Years of Lead (anni di piombo), a period characterized by widespread social conflicts and terrorist acts attributed to far-left and far-right political movements and the secret services.

== Second commission (1982–1987) ==
Pio La Torre, a member of the first Antimafia Commission, who was killed during the establishment of the second

On 13 September 1982, the second Antimafia Commission was installed, in the midst of the Second Mafia War, after the killing of former deputy and member of the first Antimafia Commission, Pio La Torre, on 30 April 1982, and the prefect of Palermo, general Carlo Alberto Dalla Chiesa on 3 September 1982. The first president was the DC senator Nicola La Penta. He was succeeded by the PCI deputy Abdon Alinovi.

The Antimafia Commission had no power to investigate. It analyzed anti-mafia legislation, in particular the new Antimafia Law, known as the Rognoni–La Torre Law, and the performance of the state and judicial authorities. While the commission was in function, the Maxi Trial against the Mafia took place in Palermo. The commission also analyzed new developments in the Mafia after their entry in drug trafficking. In July 1987, the commission was dissolved at the end of the legislature.

== Third commission (1987–1992) ==
In 1987, the third Antimafia Commission was installed under the presidency of PCI senator Gerardo Chiaromonte. This commission marked a change in operations, as the focus shifted from analyses and knowledge about the Mafia to proposals at the legislative and administrative level. The commission studied the connections between the four Mafia-type organizations and the links between the Mafia and secret Masonic lodges. It lobbied for the introduction of new legislation, such as the reform of the Rognoni–La Torre Law, whereby asset seizure and confiscation provisions were applicable to other forms of criminal association, including drug trafficking, extortion, and usury, among others.

The third Antimafia Commission made public the 2,750 files on links between the Mafia and politicians, that had been kept secret by the first commission. In February 1992, ahead to the general elections of 5 April 1992, the commission urged political parties to apply a code of self-regulation when presenting candidates, a measure intended to mirror the legislative provisions for public-office holders in 1990; no one should stand for election who had been committed for trial, was a fugitive from the law, was serving a criminal sentence, was subject to preventive measures or was convicted, even though not definitively, for crimes of corruption, Mafia association, and a range of others.

A week before the election, the commission reported that on the basis of information received from two-thirds of the prefectures in the country, thirty-three candidates standing in the elections were "non-presentable", according to the code of self-regulation.

== Fourth commission (1992–1994) ==
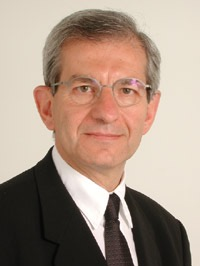
Luciano Violante, a member of the fourth Antimafia Commission

On 8 June 1992, the fourth Antimafia Commission was installed, after the Capaci bombing resulted in the murder of judge Giovanni Falcone on 23 May. It was modified after the via D'Amelio Bombing caused the death of his colleague Paolo Borsellino on 19 July. On 23 September 1992, Luciano Violante from the Democratic Party of the Left (PDS) was appointed president of the commission. Under Violante's leadership, the commission worked for 17 months until the parliamentary dissolution in February 1994. It passed thirteen reports, the most important of which was on the relations between the Mafia and politics, the terzo livello (third level) of the Mafia, on 6 April 1993.

The Antimafia Commission had to work in one of Italy’s most critical moments, when Italy's democracy was challenged by criminal subversion by the Mafia and the Mani pulite investigation, that unravelled Tangentopoli (Italian for "Bribeville"), the corruption-based political system that dominated the First Italian Republic. Despite the politically sensitive nature of the commission’s work, Violante's greatest achievement was that the most important reports were backed by all major parties, instead as in the past, of producing politicised majority (government) and minority (opposition) reports on the same theme.

Important pentiti like Buscetta, Antonio Calderone, Leonardo Messina, and Gaspare Mutolo gave testimonies. It found that Lima, the former DC member and mayor of Palermo who was murdered in March 1992, had been linked to the Mafia, and that former prime minister Giulio Andreotti had been Lima's political contact in Rome. On 16 November 1992, Buscetta testified before the Antimafia Commission. He said: "Salvo Lima was, in fact, the politician to whom Cosa Nostra turned most often to resolve problems for the organization whose solution lay in Rome." Other collaborating witnesses confirmed that Lima had been specifically ordered to fix the appeal of the Maxi Trial with Italy's Supreme Court of Cassation, and had been murdered because he failed to do so.

In February 1993, Gaspare Mutolo warned the Antimafia Commission of the likelihood that further attacks were being planned by the Corleonesi on the mainland. On 10 June 1993, the Senate authorized to proceed with the criminal investigation of Andreotti. On 2 March 1995, he was formally committed to trial in Palermo.

== Other commissions (1994–present) ==
After Violante, presidents of the Antimafia Commission were:

- Tiziana Parenti (FI, 1994–1996)
- Ottaviano Del Turco (SDI, 1996–1999)
- Giuseppe Lumia (SD, 1999–2001)
- Roberto Centaro (FI, 2001–2006)
- Francesco Forgione (PRC, 2006–2008)
- Giuseppe Pisanu (PdL, 2008–2013)
- Rosy Bindi (PD, 2013–2018)
- Nicola Morra (M5S, 2018–2022)
- Chiara Colosimo (FdI, since 2023)

== See also ==
- List of members of the Italian Antimafia Commission
- Antimafia Pool, team of magistrates

== Bibliography ==
- Jamieson, Alison (1999). The Antimafia: Italy's fight against organized crime, London: Palgrave Macmillan, ISBN 0-333-80158-X.
- Servadio, Gaia (1976), Mafioso. A history of the Mafia from its origins to the present day, London: Secker & Warburg ISBN 0-436-44700-2
- La Commissione parlamentare antimafia
