= Honoured Society (Australia) =

Governing body of many Australian mafias

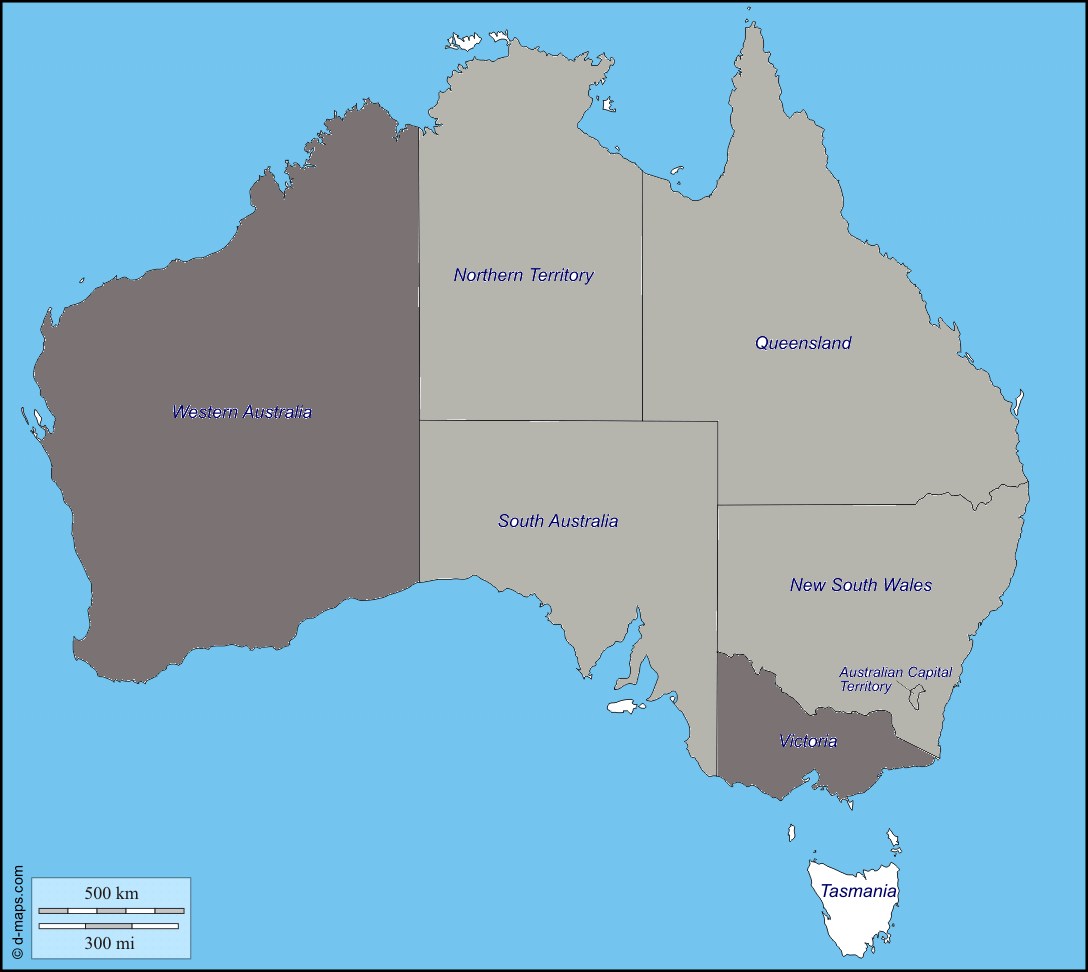
- 'Ndrangheta in Australia by region: Crime families reunited into locals; Independent crime families; Inactive
- Founded: c. 1920
- Founding location: Melbourne, Victoria
- Years active: 1920s – present
- Territory: Active in all Australia, mainly in the Western Australia and Victoria regions
- Ethnicity: Calabrians, Italian Australians
- Membership: 9 'ndrine ("crime families")
- Activities: Racketeering, illegal gambling, drug trafficking, money laundering, fencing, fraud, pimping, extortion, loan-sharking, arms trafficking, conspiracy
- Allies: Carlton Crew (close cooperation from the mid-1990s to the present), Calabrese Family (since the beginning of the 2000s absorbed by Honoured Society), Bogota Cartel (2000 - 2010)
- Rivals: Carlton Crew (antagonism in the 1970s to the early 1990s), and other street gangs

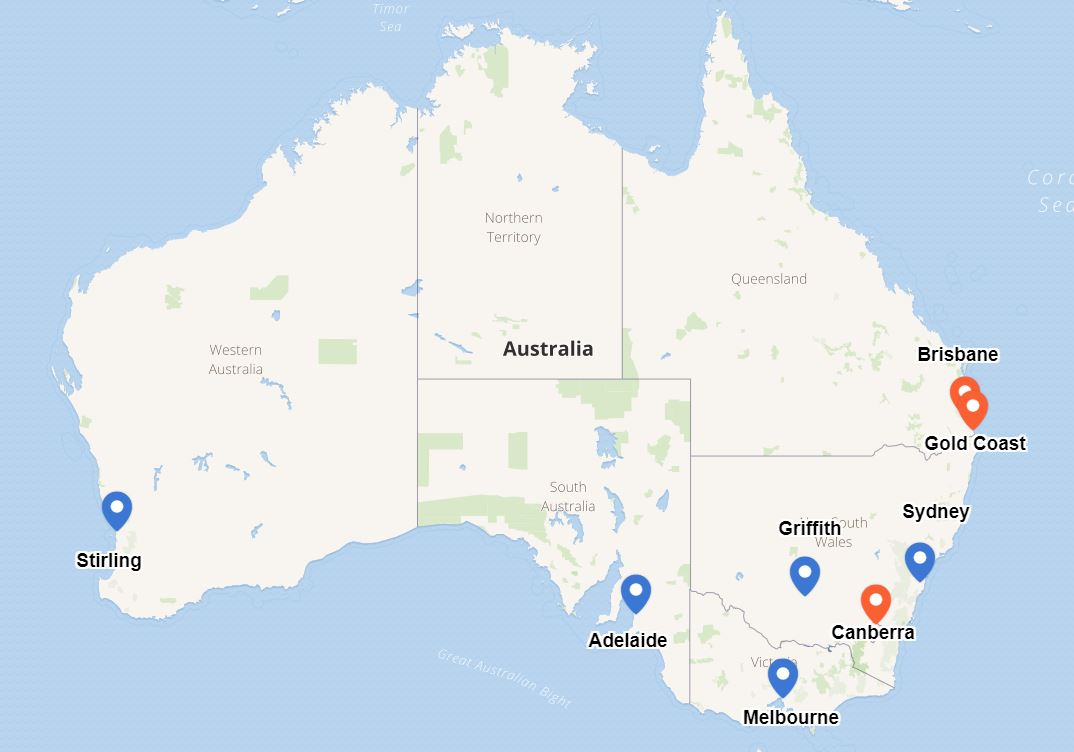
Known locales in blue and known 'ndrinas in orange (2017)

The Honoured Society (Italian: Onorata Società) is a Calabrian 'ndrangheta criminal confederation, started in Melbourne and currently active in all of Australia. Frank Benvenuto was a leading figure in the Melbourne groups until his slaying in 2000. Tony Romeo, another high-ranking member, was shot in 2002.

== History ==
Known by the names "The Honoured Society", L'Onorata Societa or La Famiglia to Italians but more simply as the Mafia to most Australians, the 'ndrangheta has controlled Italian-Australian organised crime all along the East Coast of Australia since the early 20th century. The 'ndrangheta began in Queensland, where they continued their rural form of organised crime, especially in the fruit and vegetable industry. From 1928 to 1940, some 10 homicides and 30 bombings were attributed to the Society. 'Ndrangheta operating in Australia include the Sergi, Barbaro and Papalia clans. Similarly in Victoria the major families are named as Italiano and Benvenuto.

Melbourne godfather Domenico "The Pope" Italiano died in 1962 followed several weeks later by the death of the cell's enforcer Antonio "The Toad" Barbara, both of natural causes, leaving a power vacuum that sparked a struggle to take over the cell. That in turn resulted in the deaths of Calabrian-born mobsters Vincenzo Angilletta and Vincenzo Muratore, sparking the "Market Wars" over control of the Queen Victoria Market. At the time it was unclear that most involved in the Market Wars were affiliated with the 'ndrangheta. A Victoria Market stallholder named Liborio Benvenuto was eventually to take over as godfather, a position he held until his death of natural causes in 1988.

In 1964, investigations by Victoria Police into the Victoria Market murders prompted the Victorian Government to invite two overseas experts on Italian organised crime to assist, John T. Cusack, a district supervisor of the United States' Federal Bureau of Narcotics, and Dr Ugo Macera, an assistant commissioner of police in Calabria. The Cusack and Macera reports revealed the existence of the Society in Melbourne, warning that without action being taken, within 25 years they would have diversified from their stand-over tactics in the fruit and vegetable industries and have monopolies in such fields as "labour racketeering, wholesale distribution of alcoholic and soft drinks, the importation of olive oil, tomato paste and cheese, the baking and distribution of Italian baked goods, the vending machine business, the monopolistic ownership of night clubs and taverns, musical recording and record distributing companies, model and theatrical booking agencies and building and road construction companies". Neither report was made public.

In November 1964, ASIO was tasked with conducting a nationwide intelligence survey of the 'ndrangheta. In their 1965 report they found that the Society began with the arrival of the ship Re D'Italia in Adelaide in 1922. The vessel carried three 'ndrangheta members who set up cells in Melbourne, Perth and Sydney. Domenico Strano established the Sydney cell, Antonio Barbaro established another in Melbourne while the member who established the cell in Perth was not named for legal reasons as he was still living at the time of the report. Domenico Italiano arrived in Melbourne in 1930 and entered into a partnership with Barbaro making Melbourne the most dominant cell. Eventually Italiano was named as Godfather while Barbaro worked as his enforcer. ASIO agent Colin Brown's 1965 report, which was headed "The Italian Criminal Society in Australia", found that "Secrecy and allegiance to the organisation [was] increasingly ensured by the intermarriage of families within it" and that children born into the families were brought up to take part. It repeated the recommendations and warnings found in both the Cusack and Macera reports. The Brown report was never made public.

The recommendations of the Cusack, Macera and Brown reports were ignored and their warnings came true, the 'ndrangheta diversified into drugs and other organised crime and invested heavily in legitimate businesses to launder its profits. The Society did not come to police attention again until the July 1977 murder of Donald Mackay, Australia's first political assassination, for his anti-drugs campaign. The public outcry resulted in the Woodward Royal Commission (1977–1979) which found that the 'ndrangheta were firmly entrenched in Australia.

In 1982, a Mildura greengrocer, Dominic Marafiote informed police of the location of local marijuana crops and the names of several 'ndrangheta bosses involved with them. On 18 July 1985, Dominic disappeared and his parents, Carmelo and Rosa Marafiote, were executed in their home in Adelaide. Dominic's body was found two years later, buried under a chicken coop in Victoria.

In 1982, Race Mathews, Victoria's newly elected Minister of Police, called for an update of the Cusack report which informed the government that the "economic and social strength" of the Society had grown remarkably in the 18 years since the Cusack report and that "effective countermeasures are beyond the present capacity of the Victoria Bureau of Criminal Intelligence (BCI)". Also in 1982, Victorian police arrested Gianfranco Tizzoni with a bootful of marijuana. Tizzoni was found to be the Society's main drug distributor in Victoria and in 1983 he became a supergrass. Tizzoni named James Bazley as the hitman who had murdered Donald Mackay and named principals and members of the 'ndrangheta in Victoria. He also informed police that the Society had infiltrated policing, politics and public offices throughout Australia. The information was presented in a 1985 BCI report, however, staffing levels and a lack of resources prevented the BCI from taking any action on the information.

Notwithstanding that the Bureau has identified many Organisation principles and members, and activities, legal and illegal, it is virtually powerless to do more than reactively monitor. - 1985 Victoria Bureau of Criminal Intelligence report.

The 1985 report was never made public, but two of its officers spoke about some of its contents at a public meeting.

In 1990, Pasquale "Il Principale" Barbaro, a Canberra mafia boss-turned police informant, named Rosario 'Ross' Gangemi as the "de facto" head of the Honoured Society. Gangemi, an old school soldier was himself named by the Italian police of ordering the infamous Victoria Market Murders campaign in the mid-60's then under the orders of Liborio Benvenuto, Frank Benvenuto's father. When Liborio Benvenuto knew he was close to death he nominated Giuseppe "Joe" Arena to succeed him as Melbourne godfather. Arena, who was 50, was himself shot dead by a rival faction six weeks after Benvenuto died in 1988. Michele Scriva, another Gangemi associate, committed Melbourne's first mafia hit, stabbing Giuseppe "Fat Joe" Versace 91 times in 1945. He later served years in jail for another murder. Gangemi died at 83 years old on 2 July 2008 of natural causes, there were over 250 mourners at his funeral, one of them being the high-profile member of the Carlton Crew, Mick "The Don" Gatto.

Following the 1998–2006 Melbourne gangland killings, in 2008, the 'ndrangheta were tied to the importation of 15 million ecstasy pills to Melbourne, at the time the world's largest ecstasy haul. The pills were hidden in a container-load of tomato cans from Calabria. Australian 'ndrangheta boss Pasquale Barbaro was arrested. Pasquale Barbaro's father Francesco Barbaro was a boss throughout the 1970s and early 1980s until his retirement. Several of the Barbaro clan, including among others, Francesco, were suspected in orchestrating the murder of Donald Mackay in 1977 for his anti-drugs campaign.

In 2006, it was revealed that the Coles and Woolworths conglomerates had been extorted from the mid-1960s to the early 1990s, paying 50 cents a case on fruit and vegetables from suppliers nominated by the 'Ndrangheta. A Coles executive told police that the extortion had cost their supermarket division at least $5 million a year. The scheme was broken after Frank Costa took over the supply of fruit and vegetables.

Italian authorities believe that former Western Australian mayor of the city of Stirling, Tony Vallelonga, is an associate of Giuseppe Commisso, boss of the Siderno clan of the 'Ndrangheta. In 2009, Italian police overheard the two discussing 'ndrangheta activities. Since migrating from Italy to Australia in 1963, Vallelonga has "established a long career in grass-roots politics".

A report in 2016 by Vice Media indicated that illegal activities continued to be profitable: "Between 2004 and 2014, the gang's members amassed more than $10 million [US$7.6 million] in real estate and race horses in Victoria alone pouring money into wholesalers, cafes, and restaurants".

A June 2015 report by BBC News discussed an investigation by Fairfax Media and Four Corners which alleged that "the 'Ndrangheta, runs a drugs and extortion business worth billions of euros" in Australia and that "politicians have been infiltrated by the Calabrian mafia". The 2016 report by Vice Media reported that "a court found 'it was reasonable for police to suspect accused Melbourne Mafia boss Antonio Madafferi had put out a $200,000 [$150,000 USD] hit on a man he believed was providing information to [newspaper] The Age'".

In February 2020, two individuals, said to be "multimillionaire fruit and vegetable kings" were alleged to be 'Ndrangheta "capos", having a relationship with the "secretive criminal organisation". The Sydney Morning Herald report specified that the two "are not accused of any crime in either Italy or Australia". The alleged information was obtained during investigations of other individuals during Operation Eyphemos in Calabria, which "led to the arrest ... of 65 men for alleged mafia activities including extortion and political corruption in Calabria".

In April of 2023, it was reported that the leader of the Melbourne 'ndrine, one of the aforementioned "prominent Australians" named by Italian authorities in Operation Eyphemos, had stepped down from his role. In doing so, he named two successors that remain unnamed in Australia for legal reasons.

== Membership ==
- Barbaro 'ndrina – led by Domenico "Aussie" Barbaro (arrested in 2008); originally from Platì
- Sergi 'ndrina – led by Paolo Sergi; originally from Platì
- Papalia 'ndrina – led by Domenico Papalia; originally from Platì
- Trimboli 'ndrina (anglicised in Trimbole) – led by Rocco Trimboli (imprisoned in 2012); originally from Platì
- Arena 'ndrina - led by Francesco (Frank) Arena; originally from San Luca
- Italiano 'ndrina - led by Domenico Italiano; originally from Palmi
- Strangio 'ndrina – led by Domenico Nirta; originally from San Luca
- Romeo 'ndrina – led by Unknown; originally from San Luca
- Morabito 'ndrina – led by Unknown; originally from Africo
- Alvaro 'ndrina – led by Giuseppe Alvaro; originally from Sinopoli

== In popular culture ==
The Honoured Society was featured in the second instalment of the local Australian TV series Underbelly: A Tale of Two Cities, and mentioned once in the first Underbelly TV series set in Melbourne.

== See also ==
- Melbourne gangland killings
- The Carlton Crew
- Moran family
- Organised crime in Australia
- Sydney gangland war
