= Molluso 'ndrina =

- Founded: 1970s
- Founder: Giosefatto Molluso
- Founding location: Platì, Calabria, Italy
- Years active: 1970s-present
- Territory: Platì in Calabria; Buccinasco, Milan, and Corsico in Lombardy.
- Ethnicity: Calabrians
- Criminal activities: Drug trafficking, money laundering, arms trafficking, extortion, corruption, gambling, murder
- Allies: Barbaro 'ndrina Papalia 'ndrina Sergi 'ndrina Trimboli 'ndrina South American drug cartels

The Molluso 'ndrina is a clan of the 'Ndrangheta, a criminal and mafia-type organisation in Calabria, Italy. The 'ndrina is based in the city of Platì.

The 'ndrina is historically allied to the Barbaro and Papalia 'ndrine, both also from Platì. Since the 1980s, the Mollusos have a strong presence in the province of Milan, in particular in the city of Buccinasco.

== History ==
The Molluso 'ndrina was founded around the 1970s, and like most other 'ndrine from Platì, it began as a branch of the powerful Barbaro 'ndrina, which during that period also encompassed the Papalia, Agresta, Trimboli, Perre, Sergi 'ndrine, among others.

Between 1990 and 1992, the Molluso 'ndrina, under the leadership of Francesco Molluso, was involved in international drug trafficking, which, imported eighty kilograms of heroin per month from Turkey, as well as similarly large quantities of cocaine from Colombia and hashish. The drugs were distributed in various regions through the 'ndrina’s couriers and local wholesalers. Molluso's right-hand man was his brother-in-law, Francesco Palmieri, who was caught in Milan with 75 kilograms of heroin in the 1990s.

Giosefatto Molluso, known as "Gesu", the capobastone of the 'ndrina, was sentenced to 9 years and 3 months in the 2010 "Infinito" investigation. His son, Giuseppe Molluso, owner of "MG Lavori stradali", revealed in a wiretap from September 2018 the 'ndrina’s final plan to infiltrate and gradually take over the company "Ecol Service" based in Corsico, whose firm was officially registered in the white list for public contracts. The Molluso 'ndrina, began inserting their people into the company, including Alessandro Illuminato, nephew of Giosefatto, whose father had served 30 years for drug trafficking and kidnapping, and other men from their hometown, Platì. One of them, Nicola Grillo, was described by a coworker as someone with powerful backing. Investigators observed that the tone of conversations between the entrepreneurs and the Mollusos showed an attitude of deference. Giuseppe Molluso even arranged for the 'ndrina’s involvement in the construction site of the new Monza police headquarters, while another Calabrian entrepreneur, upon arriving in Milan for excavation work, contacted the Molluso for protection in exchange for a subcontract.

In Milan, the Molluso 'ndrina is implicated in the padel sports business. According to an investigation by the Direzione Investigativa Antimafia (DIA), Marco Molluso, a relative of Giosofatto Molluso, invested €700,000 in building eight padel courts at the Sant'Ambrogio municipal sports center in Barona. These funds allegedly came from a scheme involving false invoices, leading to Marco Molluso’s house arrest on charges of issuing and using false invoices and self-money laundering. The courts, constructed without proper authorization and seized by authorities, were part of a contract for a non-existent service agreement. Investigators concluded that Molluso used illicit profits from multiple tax crimes to finance the courts and aimed to earn clean revenue from their rental. His real estate company carried out a fraud exceeding €1.5 million between 2020 and 2021, with about half invested in the padel courts.
