= Francesco Barbaro (Castanu) =

Italian crime boss (1927–2018)

- Mugshot of Francesco Barbaro
- Born: 13 May 1927; Platì, Kingdom of Italy
- Died: 1 November 2018 (aged 91); Parma, Italy
- Allegiance: 'Ndrangheta

Francesco Barbaro (13 May 1927 – 1 November 2018), also known as U'Castanu, was a boss of the 'Ndrangheta, a Mafia-type criminal organisation based in Calabria, Italy. Born in Platì, he was the head of the Barbaro 'ndrina. He was the son of Francesco Barbaro and Marianna Carbone, who at the beginning of the twentieth century gave rise to the powerful Barbaro 'ndrina, which was later divided into various branches, namely the Castani (a nickname of Francesco), the Nigri, the Pillari and the Rosi, with links to all the most important gangs of the 'Ndrangheta.

Barbaro was known as the king of kidnapping in the 1980s. He became a member of Camera di Controllo, a provincial commission of the 'Ndrangheta formed at the end of the Second 'Ndrangheta war in September 1991, to avoid further internal conflicts.

== 'Ndrangheta heritage ==
In the 1950s the clan was involved in a bloody feud with the Mammoliti 'ndrina from Castellace in the municipality of Oppido Mamertina. In the end the Mammoliti clan prevailed and the Barbaros moved back to Platì.

Many of the 'Ndrangheta clans in Platì, such as Trimboli, Sergi, Romeo, Zappia, Papalia and Marando are associated through blood relations, which center around the Barbaro.

Platì has been called the "cradle of kidnapping" and it is suspected that kidnap victims were held within a complex network of tunnels. The money extorted with kidnappings was invested in drug trafficking and construction in northern Italy, in particularly around Buccinasco, near Milan. The clan participated in a cartel of 'Ndrangheta families involved in cocaine trafficking with the Mafia family of Mariano Agate.

== Arrest ==
Francesco Barbaro was arrested on 5 January 1989. Over the years, Francesco's son Giuseppe Barbaro took over the leadership of the clan from his aging father. Giuseppe was included in the list of most wanted fugitives in Italy until his arrest on 10 December 2001. Another son of Francesco, Rocco Barbaro, was arrested on 8 February 2003.

One of his daughters married Giuseppe Pelle, one of the four sons of Antonio Pelle, the 'Ndrangheta boss from San Luca, securing a tight alliance between the two powerful 'ndrine.

Arrested for the first time in the 1970s, when he served six years in prison for conspiracy to commit a crime, Barbaro was subsequently convicted of a kidnapping in Calabria in 1989. He was sentenced to life imprisonment together with his nephew Antonio Papalia from Buccinasco (Milan) for the murder of Brigadier Antonino Marino, which took place in Bovalino (Reggio Calabria) on 9 September 1990.

Barbaro died in the prison of Parma at the age of 91 on 1 November 2018. At the end of his life he was considered a kind of relic by his great-grandsons, based in Italy and abroad.
