= Giuseppe Barbaro =

Italian criminal

- Born: 24 May 1956 (age 70); Platì, Calabria, Italy
- Other name: 'u Sparitu ("the Disappeared")
- Occupation: Crime boss
- Organization: Barbaro 'ndrina
- Children: 4
- Parent: Francesco Barbaro (father)
- Allegiance: 'Ndrangheta
- Criminal charges: Murder, Kidnapping, Mafia Association
- Capture status: Arrested
- Wanted by: Italian authorities
- Wanted since: 1987
- Time at large: 14 years

Details
- Date apprehended: 2001-12-10
- Imprisoned at: 2001-12-10

Giuseppe Barbaro (Italian pronunciation: [ɡaeˈtaːno ˈbarbaro]; born 24 May 1956 in Platì), also known as 'u Sparitu ("the Disappeared"), is a boss of the 'Ndrangheta, a Mafia-type criminal organisation based in Calabria, Italy. He is a son of Francesco Barbaro, one of the leaders of the Barbaro 'ndrina based in Platì. He was included in the list of most wanted fugitives in Italy until his arrest on 10 December 2001.

== Head of the clan ==
His father was arrested on 5 January 1989 (beginning his imprisonment which ended with his death in prison at the age of 91 in 2018), Giuseppe Barbaro had gradually took over the leadership of the clan from his aging father while he was on the run.

Platì has been called the "cradle of kidnapping", and the clan was actively involved in the kidnapping industry. Seventeen high-profile kidnappings have been attributed to the clan. He is considered to be one of the key players in the complex secretive negotiations with the authorities that returned the freedom to Milan-based entrepreneur Alessandra Sgarella, who was kidnapped on 11 December 1997, and released after 266 days on 4 September 1998, after paying a US$5 million ransom.

The money extorted with kidnappings was invested in drug trafficking and construction in northern Italy, in particularly around Buccinasco, near Milan. The clan participated in a cartel of 'Ndrangheta families involved in cocaine trafficking with the Mafia family of Mariano Agate.

== Fugitive and arrest ==
He was on the run since 1987 and in 1992, he was included in the list of the 30 most wanted fugitives in Italy, wanted for murder, kidnapping and mafia association. On 10 December 2001, he was arrested with his wife in an underground bunker in his hometown Platì. He had become a father four times in his fourteen years on the run.

The operation of the Carabinieri in Platì revealed a complex system of caches, bunkers, hidden doors and tunnels in the mountains of Platì and the country, used for decades by Barbaro and other families Platì to escape the police. The tunnels – most running parallel to the town's sewer system – were sophisticated and, in some places, large enough to drive a truck through. Remote-controlled trap doors lead into houses, some of them uninhabited, enabling the mafiosi to escape from the police. Some of the tunnels emerged outside the town, close to woodland, while others opened into animal pens and barns on local farms. It is suspected that kidnap victims were held within the complex.

== Video games ==
Barbaro's name is the basis for Joe Barbaro, one of the main characters in the 2010 video game Mafia II.
