= Sergi 'ndrina =

Clan of the 'Ndrangheta

- Founded: 1970s
- Founder: Paolo Sergi; Francesco Sergi; Giuseppe Sergi
- Founding location: Platì, Calabria, Italy
- Years active: 1970s-present
- Territory: Platì in Calabria; Metropolitan City of Milan in Lombardy; Rome in Lazio; Outside Italy its present in Australia.
- Ethnicity: Calabrians
- Criminal activities: Drug trafficking, money laundering, arms trafficking, extortion, corruption, murder
- Allies: Barbaro 'ndrina Papalia 'ndrina Trimboli 'ndrina Molluso 'ndrina South American drug cartels

The Sergi 'ndrina is a clan of the 'Ndrangheta, a criminal and mafia-type organisation in Calabria, Italy. The 'ndrina is based in the city of Platì.

In Northern Italy, they are located in the southern area of Milan, in collaboration with the Papalia and Marando 'ndrine, with whom they are involved in the trafficking of cocaine and heroin in Busto Arsizio and Gallarate. In Rome, they are active in the San Basilio area. Abroad, there has been a significant presence since at least the 1970s in Australia.

== History ==
The Sergi 'ndrina emerged around the 1970s as a branch of the powerful Barbaro 'ndrina, from which several other 'ndrine also originated, including the Papalia, Trimboli, and Perre 'ndrine.

In the early 1980s, the Sergi 'ndrina had established itself as one of the most dominant 'Ndrangheta groups operating in Northern Italy, particularly in the municipalities of Corsico and Buccinasco, which were described by state witness Saverio Morabito as "isole felici" (safe havens) for criminal activity. During this period, in collaboration with the Papalia 'ndrina, the Sergi were heavily involved in large-scale drug trafficking, generating such immense profits that, according to Morabito, they no longer knew where to store the money. Their operations benefited from a well-established network of institutional corruption, which included members of law enforcement and the judiciary. In this climate of impunity, fugitives lived openly in areas under their control, and any attempts at police enforcement were swiftly neutralized. One such case involved a police officer from Corsico who, after arresting Francesco Sergi, was so intimidated that he begged Morabito and another associate for protection, only narrowly escaping a plan to have him killed.

During the 1980s, the Sergi 'ndrina managed 100 kilograms of cocaine per week, operating out of their headquarters at the Trevi Bar in Buccinasco and the Esso gas station on Via Milano in Corsico, which was run by the Moscardi family.

Paolo Sergi, one of the leaders of the 'ndrina, was arrested in 1992 and received a definitive life sentence ten years later for multiple crimes, including six murders linked to drug-related executions in the late 1980s. Despite his convictions, among them, 29 years for participating in the kidnapping of Cesare Casella, Sergi has been under house arrest since 2011 due to serious heart problems, residing in a villa in Zibido San Giacomo. His release has raised concerns within Milan's anti-mafia prosecutor's office, given his criminal background, which includes drug trafficking operations and collaborations with notorious narco Roberto Pannunzi.

On 20 May 2008, an anti-drug operation led to 48 pre-trial detention orders against alleged members of the Cataldo 'ndrina from Locri, who were supplied with cocaine by the Sergi and Marando 'ndrine, who in turn imported it from Colombia and Morocco.

== Leadership ==
- Paolo Sergi: Historial boss of the 'ndrina, led the organization in Northern Italy since the 1980s. He is brother-in-law of Antonio Papalia, head of the Papalia 'ndrina.
- Francesco Sergi: Arrested during the Nord-Sud operation in the 1990s and sentenced to life imprisonment.
- Giuseppe Sergi: known as Peppone, lives as a free citizen and runs a business in Corsico.
