= Papalia =

Papalia (Italian pronunciation: [papaˈliːa]) is an Italian surname. Notable people with the surname include:

- Adam Papalia, Australian sportscaster
- Carmen Papalia (born 1981), Canadian artist
- The Papalia 'ndrina, an Italian criminal clan
  - Antonio Papalia (born 1954), Italian mobster
  - Domenico Papalia (1945–2026), Italian mobster
- Melanie Papalia (born 1984), Canadian actress
- Paul Papalia (born 1962), Australian politician
- The Papalia crime family, an Italian–Canadian crime family
  - Johnny Papalia (1924–1997), Canadian mobster
