= Mario Condello =

Italian-Australian organised crime figure

- Born: 12 April 1952; Carlton, Victoria, Australia
- Died: 6 February 2006 (aged 53); Brighton, Victoria, Australia
- Cause of death: Homicide (Gunshot wounds)
- Occupations: Lawyer, Loan Shark
- Known for: Participant in the Melbourne gangland killings
- Status: Deceased
- Allegiance: The Carlton Crew
- Convictions: Arson, fraud, drug trafficking
- Criminal charge: Conspiracy to murder Carl Williams

Mario Rocco Condello (12 April 1952 – 6 February 2006) was an Italian-Australian organised crime figure. Condello, once a lawyer, was a member of the Carlton Crew, and is believed to have been a money launderer for Melbourne's Calabrian mafia, the Ndrangheta. He was a key figure in the Melbourne gangland killings.

== Background ==
Condello was born in Carlton, Victoria to Calabrian parents and was at one time a lawyer in Melbourne, Australia. He had a criminal record consisting of arson, fraud and drug trafficking and was also suspected by police to have been involved in multiple murders.

In June 2004, an attempt on Condello's life was foiled when two gunmen were caught by police outside Brighton Cemetery near his house.

In 2005, he was charged with plotting to murder rival crime boss Carl Williams. Williams later was convicted of conspiracy to murder Condello.

== Murder ==
Condello was shot dead in his driveway on 6 February 2006, a day before he was due to stand trial for conspiracy to murder Williams.

On 7 February 2006, his counsel, Robert Richter, QC told the trial judge, "Unfortunately, I announce my client won't be answering bail, he was murdered last night...He died confident of his acquittal."

Police feared that his murder would be the resumption of the gangland wars. Victoria Police believed hitman Rodney Collins killed Mario Condello as a paid hit. Collins was serving a life sentence with a minimum of 32 years for a 1987 double murder for which he was convicted in May 2010, before his death in 2018.

About 700 people attended Condello's funeral, with Mick Gatto serving as a pallbearer.

== Popular culture ==
Condello was depicted as a loan shark in the television series Underbelly, portrayed by Martin Sacks.

== See also ==
- List of unsolved murders (2000–present)
