= Mammoliti 'ndrina =

- Founded: 1930s
- Founding location: Gioia Tauro plain, Calabria, Italy
- Years active: 1930s-present
- Territory: Gioia Tauro plain in Calabria; Milan in Lombardy.
- Ethnicity: Calabrians
- Criminal activities: Racketeering, kidnapping and extortion

The Mammoliti 'ndrina (Italian pronunciation: [mammoˈliːti]) is a powerful clan of the 'Ndrangheta, a criminal and mafia-type organisation in Calabria, southern Italy. The 'ndrina is based in Castellace and Oppido Mamertina in the plain of Gioia Tauro in southern Calabria on the Tyrrhenian coast. The clan is considered to be one of the more powerful in the area, and is closely linked to the Rugolo clan through intermarriage. They are often referred to as the Mammoliti-Rugolo clan.

== Feud with the Barbaro clan ==
In the 1950s the Mammoliti clan was involved in a bloody feud in Castellace with the Barbaro 'ndrina. In October 1954, the head of the clan, Francesco Mammoliti, was killed by Domenico Barbaro. On November 7, 1954, the Mammolitis retaliated and killed Francesco Barbaro and some others, an attack that was attributed to Francesco's son Vincenzo Mammoliti, who was acquitted by the court because of insufficient proof. On January 19, 1955, Giovanni Barbaro, the brother of Francesco, was killed with 31 gunshots. Again Vincenzo was acquitted, but his brother Antonino Mammoliti was convicted for murder.

In the end the Mammoliti clan prevailed and the Barbaro clan moved to Platì. The feud lingered on until 1978, when Domenico Barbaro was killed in Perugia, after serving 26 years in prison for the 1954 murder of Francesco Mammoliti. Francesco's sons, Vincenzo and Saverio Saro Mammoliti took over the command of the clan seconded by their other brother Antonino Mammoliti. Blood relatives represented the interests in the city council of their area of interest. The Mammoliti-Rugolo clan is closely linked to the Piromalli 'ndrina and the Mazzafero 'ndrina.

== Criminal enterprise ==
Since the 1950s, powerful 'Ndrangheta families, such as the Mammolitis and the Piromallis, launched into broad-scale expropriations of land and full-blown entrepreneurship, financing their operations by intercepting government development funds or by kidnapping the children of rich industrialists. The Mammoliti clan acquired the property or the direct or indirect control over wide extensions of land in Castellace, Oppido and Santa Cristina in the Gioia Tauro plain. They forced most landowners to sell their properties at a price much lower than the market one, by imposing heavy extortion taxes or by damaging their trees and products. When they did not succeed in obtaining legal ownership of the lands, they frequently gained de facto control of the farms, selling the products and even collecting the relative farming subsidies.

One of the landed proprietors ruined by the expansion of the clan described the rise of the clan at the end of the 1970s: “A few years ago Vincenzo Mammoliti used to earn a paltry amount from his dishonest dealings as a watchman in the citrus orchards. Now he travels around in de luxe cars, he has bought up factories and land, and people say he has accumulated a fortune worth hundreds of millions [lire].”

== Getty kidnap ==
Saverio and Vincenzo Mammoliti were two of the men charged with the kidnap of John Paul Getty III on July 10, 1973, in Rome. Police considered Saverio Mammoliti to be "very close to the brain, or rather brains, behind the plot," including Girolamo Piromalli. Nine men eventually were arrested. Two were convicted and sent to prison. The others, including Piromalli and the Mammoliti brothers, were acquitted for lack of evidence. However, Saverio Mammoliti, a fugitive at the time, was convicted for drug trafficking.

The ransom initially demanded was $17 million (equivalent to $123 million in 2025) for his safe return. However, the family suspected a ploy by the rebellious teenager to extract money from his miserly grandfather. John Paul Getty Jr. asked his father J. Paul Getty for the money, but was refused, arguing that his 13 other grandchildren could also become kidnap targets if he paid.

In November 1973, an envelope containing a lock of hair and a human ear arrived at a daily newspaper. The second demand had been delayed three weeks by an Italian postal strike. The demand threatened that Paul would be further mutilated unless the victims paid $3.2 million. The demand stated "This is Paul's ear. If we don't get some money within 10 days, then the other ear will arrive. In other words, he will arrive in little bits."

When the kidnappers finally reduced their demands to $3 million, Getty agreed to pay no more than $2.2 million (equivalent to $16 million in 2025), the maximum that would be tax-deductible. He lent his son the remaining $800,000 at four percent interest. Getty's grandson was found alive on December 15, 1973, in a Lauria filling station, in the province of Potenza, shortly after the ransom was paid. Getty III was permanently affected by the trauma and became a drug addict. After a stroke brought on by a cocktail of drugs and alcohol in 1981, Getty III was rendered speechless, nearly blind and partially paralyzed for the rest of his life. He died on February 5, 2011, at the age of 54.

The ransom money was invested in the trucks with which the 'Ndrangheta won all the transportation contracts for the container port of Gioia Tauro. After he decided to collaborate with Italian justice, Mammoliti confessed to have been involved in the kidnap.

== Local land acquisition ==
The Mammoliti clan also 'persuaded' local landowners to sell them their lands at giveaway prices, or to rent it to them for next to nothing - or the clan simply fenced it in and treated it as its own.

== Cordopatri case ==
The Mammolitis also exploited the estates belonging to the Cordopatri family. The Mammolitis through a front man, who paid only a symbolic rent, exploited the estates belonging to the family from 1964 up to the late 1980s. When baron Francesco Cordopatri finally succeeded in recovering control of the property in 1990, he was unable to pick the olives because local labourers systematically turned down his offers of employment, afraid of offending the Mammolitis. After his murder in July 1991, his sister Teresa Cordopatri attempted to continue, but she too faced insurmountable problems.

The case made the national and international headlines in the summer of 1994 when the Finance Ministry threatened to confiscate the property for not paying taxes on the land (whose products her family had not enjoyed since the 1960s). Baroness Cardopatri resisted the confiscation and she started a hunger strike outside the law courts in Reggio Calabria. Cardopatri was granted an extension to pay her taxes and the decade-long territorial expansion of the Mammoliti family began to be halted.

== Peace among the olive trees ==
Judge Salvatore Boemi – investigating the murder of Francesco Cordopatri – ordered the arrest of 35 members of the Mammoliti clan, Saro Mammoliti included, in an operation dubbed ‘Peace among the olive trees’. Arrests were made in June and August 1992. Charges include allegations of the murder; six bomb attacks; 19 arson attacks; the destruction of 1,100 olive, citrus and kiwi trees in 15 separate incursions, and 14 instances of agricultural equipment stolen.

Thanks almost exclusively to the baroness Cordopatri's testimony, Salvatore La Rosa – the material killer of her brother was sentenced to 25 years in prison, while Saro Mammoliti's nephew Francesco, held to be the man who ordered the murder, got life. Saro Mammoliti himself was sent down for 22 years for extortion and other Mafia-related charges. During the trials, the baroness denounced the relations between the Mammolitis and the local judiciary and politicians, such as the parliamentary leader of the far-right National Alliance, Raffaele Valensise, and the former minister of Education, the Christian Democrat Riccardo Misasi.

== Membership ==
- Francesco Mammoliti (1901-1954) — Capobastone from Castellace, murdered in 1954 during the feud with the Barbaro 'ndrina.
- Saverio "Don Saro" Mammoliti (1942) — Capobastone, son of Francesco, received life sentence in 1995, and in 2003, decided to collaborate with the Italian justice and became a pentito. Nevertheless, he received another 20 years sentence for his role in the Oppidio feud between rival clans over the control of the area.
- Domenico Rugolo (1935) — Former acting boss arrested in 2007.
