= Barbaro 'ndrina =

- Founded: Late 19th century
- Founding location: Platì, Calabria, Italy
- Years active: Late 19th century-present
- Territory: Platì, Reggio Calabria; Buccinasco, near Milan; Volpiano in Piedmont; and New South Wales in Australia
- Ethnicity: Calabrians
- Criminal activities: Drug trafficking, money laundering, arms trafficking, racketeering, corruption, extortion, kidnapping
- Allies: Papalia 'ndrina Sergi 'ndrina Trimboli 'ndrina Molluso 'ndrina Pelle 'ndrina Albanian mafia South American drug cartels
- Rivals: Mammoliti 'ndrina

The Barbaro 'ndrina is a powerful clan of the 'Ndrangheta, a criminal and mafia-type organisation in Calabria, Italy. The 'ndrina belongs to the locale of the town of Platì. According to the Direzione Investigativa Antimafia (DIA - the Italian Anti-Mafia Investigation Directorate), the Barbaro 'ndrina is one of the most powerful 'Ndrangheta clans. The clan also operates in the northern Italian regions of Lombardy (notably in Buccinasco, near Milan), Piemonte and overseas in Australia, in particular in the Griffith, New South Wales area.

== In Calabria ==
The clan was established at the end of the 19th century by Francesco Barbaro (born in 1873) in Platì. The powerful Barbaro 'ndrina was later divided into various branches or 'ndrine, with links to all the most important clans of the 'Ndrangheta. From the 10 children of Francesco Barbaro and Marianna Carbone, descended five branches of the family and eight 'ndrine that dominate the 'Ndrangheta of Platì: Barbaro Castanu, Rosi, Nigru, Pillaru, Perre Maistru, Papalia Carciutu, Sergi 'Mbilli (now in the background) and Trimboli Piseja.

The son of Pasquale Barbaro (born in 1897), Rosario Barbaro, became the head of the Rosi 'ndrina. From his son Domenico (born in 1900) descended Francesco Barbaro, called Ciccio 'u Castanu. It was his son Antonio (born in 1920) who founded the Nigru branch of the cosca, while through the marriages of his daughters Elisabetta and Serafina, the 'ndrine Perre Maistru and Papalia Carciutu developed. Three of the eight sons of Serafina Barbaro and Giuseppe Papalia (born in 1907) would leave for Milan to become the bosses of Lombardy: Domenico Papalia, Rocco Papalia and Antonio Papalia. The Papalias, together with the other satellite families of the Barbaros (Sergi-Agresta-Marando-Musitano-Molluso-Zappia), would give life to the Lombard empire of 'Ndrangheta.

=== Feud with the Mammoliti clan ===
In the 1950s the clan was involved in a bloody feud with the Mammoliti 'ndrina from Castellace in the municipality of Oppido Mamertina. In October 1954, Domenico Barbaro killed Francesco Mammoliti, the head of the rival clan. On November 7, 1954, the Mammolitis retaliated and killed Francesco Barbaro and some others, an attack that was attributed to Vincenzo Mammoliti, who was acquitted by the court due to insufficient proof. On January 19, 1955, Giovanni Barbaro, the brother of Francesco, was killed with 31 gunshots.

In the end the Mammoliti clan prevailed. The feud lingered on until 1978, when Domenico Barbaro was killed in Perugia, after serving 26 years in prison for the murder of Francesco Mammoliti in 1954. Antonio Barbaro, known as "u Nigru", and Francesco Barbaro, known as "'u Castanu", arose one of the most powerful clans of the 'Ndrangheta which also included the Perre, Trimboli, Agresti, Catanzariti, Sergi, Papalia, Musitano and Molluso clans. They are associated through blood relations, which center around the Barbaro clan. After the death of Pasquale Agresta in 1974, Antonio Barbaro took over the command over the group in Platì.

=== King of kidnapping ===
The clan’s long-time boss, Francesco Barbaro "'u Castanu" was known as the king of kidnapping in the 1980s. Seventeen high profile kidnappings have been attributed to the clan. Francesco was arrested on January 5, 1989. Francesco’s son Giuseppe Barbaro took over the leadership of the clan. He was included in the list of most wanted fugitives in Italy until his arrest on December 10, 2001. Another son of Francesco, Rocco Barbaro, was arrested on February 8, 2003.

The arrest of Giuseppe Barbaro in 2001 led to the discovery of a complex underground fortress in the mountains in Platì that had been used by the local clans for decades. The tunnels – most running parallel to the town's sewer system – were sophisticated and in some places large enough to drive a lorry through. Remote-controlled trap doors led into houses, some of them uninhabited, enabling the mafiosi to escape from the police. Some of the tunnels emerged outside the town close to woodland, while others opened into animal pens and barns on local farms. Platì has been called the "cradle of kidnapping" and it is suspected that kidnap victims were held within the complex.

== In Northern Italy ==
In the 1970s the criminal families from Platì began to move to the Metropolitan City of Milan, especially to the areas of Buccinasco and Corsico. While in the 1970s the Barbaros' largest source of income was from the kidnapping industry, in the 1980s and 1990s the 'ndrina business shifted mainly to heroin and cocaine, also participating in a cartel of 'Ndrangheta families involved in cocaine trafficking with the Sicilian Mafia family of Mariano Agate. However, following the major anti-mafia operations, the 'ndrina began to change its style: no murders, no sensational actions, and starting a massive reinvestment in construction, clubs and restaurants. From that moment on, the Barbaro 'ndrina started to have three strongholds; one in the heart of the Aspromonte in Calabria, one in Corsico and Buccinasco in the Lombardy and one in Volpiano in Piedmont.

Francesco Barbaro (called 'cicciu u castanu'), leader of the 'ndrina, was arrested on January 5, 1989 and his son Giuseppe Barbaro took command. In 1992, the 24 year old Francesco Barbaro, nephew of the homonymous called "U castanu", was arrested for drug trafficking. He transported drugs from Aspromonte to the Piedmontese municipalities of Volpiano, Cuorgnè and Chivasso.

On November 3, 2009, 17 arrests were made in the Milanese area in the operation called "Parco Sud" of the Carabinieri and the Guardia di Finanza. Domenico Barbaro, known as the Australian already in prison, was also involved, like his sons Domenico, Rosario and Salvatore. Construction contractors were also arrested, including Fortunato Startati who sheltered (boss of the Sergi 'ndrina) while he was on the run. This operation followed the "Cerberus" operation in 2008 and confirmed the operation of the 'ndrina in the municipalities of Assago, Corsico, Buccinasco and Trezzano sul Naviglio. In the operation, assets worth €5 million were seized.

On February 22, 2010, Tiziano Butturini, former mayor of the Democratic Party of Trezzano sul Naviglio, in the province of Milan and president of "Tasm di Amiacque", public companies for the management of water resources, Michele Iannuzzi, municipal councilor of the political party "The People of Freedom" and Andrea Madafferi owner of the "Kreiamo" real estate company were accused of building corruption and of association to the Barbaro criminal organization.

On 23 January 2018, an operation by the Guardia di Finanza that began in 2013 blocked drug trafficking between Colombia and the Lombard towns of Corsico, Assago, Buccinasco and Trezzano sul Naviglio headed by the Barbaro 'ndrina with the help of its branch the Papalia 'ndrina.

On 23 October 2018, an operation by the Corsico's carabinieri against drug trafficking from Milan and Como ended with 14 people arrested. A cocaine sales network would have been set up by four brothers of the Barbaro: Antonio, Francesco, Giuseppe and Salvatore Barbaro, sons of Pasquale Barbaro and entrusted to Moroccans drug dealers.

In February 2022, Rocco Barbaro, known as "‘u Sparitu", and once described by other members of the 'Ndrangheta as the "capo dei capi", was released from prison. He is considered the highest member of the Platì's 'Ndrangheta in Northern Italy.

In November 2025, the National Anti-Mafia Directorate of Milan and the Guardia di Finanza dismantled an international drug trafficking organization composed of members of the Barbaro 'ndrina and the Albanian mafia. Precautionary measures were executed against 28 suspects. The group organized and carried out international cocaine trafficking from South America to Italy, particularly Lombardy, using container ships and the “rip-off” technique to conceal the drugs within legitimate maritime cargo. Over a two-year period, more than 3.5 tons of cocaine were imported, with over 400 kilograms seized in Italy and abroad, for a total value exceeding 27 million euros. The criminal network was based in Lombardy and had branches in several European and non-European countries, using encrypted messaging systems, with investigative support from Europol and Eurojust. According to the sources, the criminal association was composed of members of the Barbaro 'ndrina, who formed the core of the organization and was responsible for promoting, directing, financing, organizing and carrying out the international drug trafficking activities, while the Albanian criminals acted as brokers in the trafficking network.

== In Australia ==
Francesco 'Little Trees' Barbaro was named as a member of the Calabrian mafia by the Woodward Royal Commission, held following the disappearance of anti-drugs campaigner Donald Mackay in 1977. He was born in 1937 in Platì and gained his nickname by planting citrus seedlings on his New South Wales farm. The Commission alleged Little Trees made a fortune from "activities associated with cannabis cultivation" and, along with Robert Trimbole and his brother-in-law Antonio Sergi (also born in Platì in 1935), was part of an organisation "comprised almost exclusively of persons of Calabrian descent, based in Griffith and Sydney, which engaged in the illicit cultivation, trafficking and distribution of cannabis" between 1974 and 1977.

In August 2008, Australian 'Ndrangheta boss Pasquale (Pat) Barbaro – the son of Francesco – was involved in the importation of 15 million ecstasy (MDMA) pills through Melbourne, at the time the world's largest ecstasy haul. The pills were hidden in 3,000 tomato cans in a shipping container sent from Calabria. Barbaro was arrested in Carlton. Another shipping container, which arrived in Melbourne in July 2008, contained 150 kilograms (330 lb) of cocaine. The investigation also identified a money-laundering operation worth more than A$9 million. In the early 1990s, Pat Barbaro was charged, and later cleared, in connection with a massive cannabis plantation on a Riverina farm.

'Pat' Barbaro pleaded guilty in Victoria's Supreme Court to charges of ecstasy and cocaine trafficking. In May 2012 he was sentenced to life in prison with a 30-year minimum.

Another Pasquale Timothy Barbaro was gunned down and killed on November 14, 2016 in Earlwood, New South Wales, a suburb of Sydney Australia. He was the nephew of Pasquale (Pat) Barbaro. On 29 November four men, members of bikie gangs, were arrested and charged with Barbaro's murder.

Two other relatives named Pasquale Barbaro had previously been murdered in 1990 and 2003, respectively.
