= Mammoliti =

Mammoliti is an Italian surname. Notable people with the surname include:

- Giorgio Mammoliti (1961–2026), Canadian politician
- Saverio Mammoliti (born 1942), 'Ndrangheta boss of the Mammoliti 'ndrina
