= Papalia 'ndrina =

Criminal organization

- Founded: 1970s
- Founder: Domenico Papalia; Antonio Papalia; Rocco Papalia
- Founding location: Platì, Calabria, Italy
- Years active: 1970s-present
- Territory: Platì in Calabria, Buccinasco, Corsico, Cesano Boscone, Trezzano sul Naviglio, and Gaggiano in Lombardy. Another branch of the family is based in Griffith, New South Wales, Australia.
- Ethnicity: Calabrians
- Criminal activities: Drug trafficking, money laundering, arms trafficking, extortion, corruption, murder
- Allies: Barbaro 'ndrina Sergi 'ndrina Trimboli 'ndrina Molluso 'ndrina South American drug cartels

The Papalia 'ndrina is a clan of the 'Ndrangheta, a criminal and mafia-type organisation in Calabria, Italy. The 'ndrina is based in the city of Platì, having strong ramifications in Northern Italy since the 1970s, particularly in the southern area of Milan, with their stronghold in the city of Buccinasco.

The 'ndrina originated as a branch of the powerful Barbaro 'ndrina, and is allied with the Sergi, and Trimboli 'ndrine, all of whom originate from Platì. Their main activity is drug trafficking, including cocaine and heroin, and during the 1980s, they were also involved in extortion. In recent years, they have expanded their operations to manage contracts and subcontracting in the construction industry. In the metropolitan area of Milan, they also hold influence over the municipalities of Corsico, Cesano Boscone, Trezzano sul Naviglio, and Gaggiano.

The 'ndrina also operates in Australia, in particular in the Griffith, New South Wales area, where it is also allied to the Barbaro and Sergi 'ndrine.

== History ==
=== Italy ===
The 'ndrina was established by Antonio, Domenico, and Rocco Papalia, three brothers originally from Platì, located in the rugged Aspromonte mountains of the province of Reggio Calabria. The family's direct integration into the 'Ndrangheta is primarily rooted in maternal descent. Through their mother, Serafina Barbaro, the Papalia brothers inherited the "fiore", the symbolic mark of initiation within the 'Ndrangheta. Serafina was the daughter of Francesco Barbaro, a patriarchal figure in one of Platì’s oldest and most influential criminal lineages, the Barbaro 'ndrina. This maternal lineage provided the Papalia brothers with legitimacy and status within the broader 'Ndrangheta structure, enabling them to found their own autonomous 'ndrina as they expanded operations in Northern Italy.

In the early 1970s, following the death of local boss Pasquale Agresta, Platì underwent a demographic and criminal shift. Leadership transitioned to the Barbaro 'ndrina, and a significant migration wave brought nearly one-fifth of Platì’s population to northern Italy. Among the migrants were the Papalia brothers, Domenico, Rocco, and Antonio, who would later emerge as leaders in the family's northern operations. The family settled primarily in Buccinasco, at the time a small rural town near Milan, composed of scattered farmsteads. From there, the Papalia 'ndrina expanded its influence over neighboring municipalities.

On 21 May 1993, assets worth between 100 and 150 billion lire (equivalent to 50-75 million euros) were seized from the Papalia family in Buccinasco, to the extent that the properties of Domenico, Rocco, and Antonio Papalia ranked first in the Eurispes classification of mafia assets. On 7 June 1997, the decision by the Milan Court to confiscate assets worth 4 billion lire from the Papalia family was made public. Antonio Papalia’s villa on Via Fratelli Rosselli was converted into a Red Cross headquarters in 2006.

On 19 May 2009, members of the Barbaro-Papalia ’ndrine were arrested in Lombardy for illicitly obtaining mortgage funds. The organization was headed by Giuseppe Pangallo from Platì and is believed to have earned up to €800,000 from its activities.

On 6 May 2017, after serving his sentence, Rocco Papalia, known as “nginu,” was released from prison. He is the only of the three historical founders of the 'ndrina to be released from jail.

On 23 October 2018, a Carabinieri operation in Corsico against drug trafficking from Milan and Como concluded with the arrest of 14 individuals. A cocaine distribution network was reportedly established by four brothers from the Barbaro-Papalia 'ndrine and entrusted to Moroccan dealers.

=== Australia ===
A branch of the 'ndrina moved to Griffith, New South Wales. Using money raised from kidnappings in Italy, the Griffith branch of the family invested heavily in the marijuana industry in the 1960s and 1970s, making a profit of about $60 million Australian dollars that was laundered via investments in tourist related developments such as restaurants and hotels in Calabria.

Two of Australia's best known murders have linked to the family. On July 15, 1977, Donald MacKay, a Griffith politician who had long been opposed to the activities of the 'ndrina in his hometown disappeared after going to meet a man who promised him information about the Papalia family. On January 10, 1989, Colin Winchester, the assistant commissioner of the Australian federal police, was murdered, a crime that is also linked to the 'ndrina. Two members of the Papalia family have been killed in Australia. On May 10, 1987, Domenico Papalia was murdered outside of his house in Melbourne and on September 3, 1989, Filippo Papalia was also murdered outside of his house in Sydney. The Sydney police described the murder of Filippo as an "execution". The police noted that he had a .25 caliber handgun with him at the time of his slaying, which the police took as a sign that he was "expecting trouble".

In 2010, the National Anti-Mafia Directorate of Italy named the Papalia family as one of the 'ndrinas with "active affiliates" in Australia. The report by the National Anti-Mafia Directorate stated, "The links with the Mafia families are steadfast and deeply rooted in Australia where permanent traditional links with the Calabrian clans have been solidly established ... Clans like Sergi, Barbaro, and Papalia have been active through their Australian affiliates for some time."

== Bibliography ==
- Humphreys, Adrian (1999). The Enforcer:Johnny Pops Papalia, A Life and Death in the Mafia. Toronto, Canada: Harper Collins. ISBN 0-00-200016-4.
