= Trimboli 'ndrina =

- Founded: 1970s
- Founder: Natale Trimboli; Rocco Trimboli; Saverio Trimboli
- Founding location: Platì, Calabria, Italy
- Years active: 1970s-present
- Territory: Platì in Calabria; Volpiano in Piedmont; Outside Italy its present in Australia.
- Ethnicity: Calabrians
- Criminal activities: Drug trafficking, money laundering, arms trafficking, extortion, corruption, gambling, murder
- Allies: Barbaro 'ndrina Papalia 'ndrina Sergi 'ndrina Molluso 'ndrina South American drug cartels

The Trimboli 'ndrina is a clan of the 'Ndrangheta, a criminal and mafia-type organisation in Calabria, Italy. The 'ndrina is based in Platì, a small town located in the Aspromonte area.

Since the 1970s, the 'ndrina has had a strong presence in Northern Italy, particularly in the city of Volpiano, in the province of Turin, where they are allied with the Marando and Agresta 'ndrine. Outside Italy, they are present in Australia.

The Trimboli 'ndrina is historically headed by the brothers Natale, Rocco, and Saverio Trimboli.

== History ==
The Trimboli 'ndrina emerged around the 1970s as a branch of the powerful Barbaro 'ndrina, from which several other 'ndrine also originated, including the Papalia, Sergi, and Perre 'ndrine, with these families typically intermarrying to strengthen their alliances.

In the 1970s the Trimboli 'ndrine were among the Calabrian criminal groups relocated to Northern Italy under residence orders, which facilitated the expansion of their criminal activities outside their hometown. The 'ndrina became involved in drug trafficking, extortion, illegal gambling, and money laundering. During the 1980s and 1990s, the Trimbolis were implicated in violent disputes over territory and control of illicit markets. Their influence extended into local politics and business, with evidence of corruption and intimidation tactics. The town of Volpiano earned the nickname "Little Platì," reflecting the strong ‘ndrangheta presence modeled after the infamous Calabrian stronghold.

In 1992, investigations by the Public Ministry and the police led to the arrest of several members of the organization, including the brothers Natale and Saverio Trimboli, who played strategic roles in the criminal group. From an anonymous property in Volpiano, which served as a drug warehouse, the organization managed to infiltrate legitimate businesses as well, reinvesting dirty money into local enterprises. In the 2000s, the Trimboli 'ndrina continued to hold significant prominence in the Piedmont underworld, especially after the conviction and disappearance of boss Pasquale Marando.

In February 2010, Saverio Trimboli was arrested. Wanted since 1994, he was subject to an arrest warrant issued by the Turin court for international drug trafficking. Listed among Italy's 100 most dangerous fugitives, Trimboli was hiding in a house in central Platì owned by a man who had emigrated to Australia decades ago. Inside the property, police discovered two hidden bunkers, one measuring 30 square meters, the other slightly smaller. During the raid, officers also seized 30 scanners, 20 handheld radios, equipment for detecting surveillance devices, and €10,000 in cash.

In April 2012, Rocco Trimboli, the leader of the 'ndrina, was arrested in the small town of Casignana, in the Locride region, following a joint operation conducted by the Carabinieri, the ROS (Special Operations Group), and the Cacciatori di Calabria. He had been a fugitive since May 2010 and was listed among Italy’s most dangerous wanted individuals. At the time of his arrest, Trimboli was subject to two separate detention orders issued by the Court of Turin: one related to international drug trafficking (Operation Riace), for which he faced a residual sentence of over eleven years, and another for mafia-type criminal association, connected to the extensive “Minotauro” investigation into ‘ndrangheta activities in Northern Italy.

In January 2015, Natale Trimboli, a high-ranking figure within the 'ndrina, was arrested after five years on the run in an apartment located in Molochio, in the province of Reggio Calabria. At the time of his capture, he offered no resistance and initially provided a false identity to the carabinieri, who quickly confirmed his true identity. Trimboli had been listed among Italy’s most dangerous fugitives by the Ministry of the Interior and was wanted for international drug trafficking, mafia association, and multiple counts of homicide. He had already been convicted in absentia and sentenced to life imprisonment for the murders of Antonio and Antonino Stefanelli and Franco Mancuso, victims of a mafia feud in Turin over control of drug trafficking territories. The bodies were never recovered, but the murders were reconstructed through the testimony of state witness Rocco Marando. In addition to the life sentence, Trimboli faced further prison terms for his central role in the 'ndrina’s criminal operations, particularly in northern Italy.
