= The Carlton Crew =

Criminal organisation in Melbourne, Australia

- Founded: 1970s
- Founding location: Carlton
- Years active: 1970s−Present
- Territory: Various neighbourhoods in Melbourne
- Ethnicity: Mainly people of Italian ancestry (Calabrians and Sicilians)
- Membership: 50-100 associates (2000s)
- Criminal activities: Racketeering, murder, illegal gambling, extortion, fraud, pimping, money laundering, loan sharking, drug trafficking, bribery
- Allies: Honoured Society and Calabrese Family (since the mid-90s), Moran and Pettingill families, Radev Bratva
- Rivals: Williams Syndicate, Honoured Society and Calabrese Family (until the early 90s)

The Carlton Crew is a criminal organisation based in Melbourne, Victoria, Australia, established and formed in 1970 and possibly earlier by the mid 1960s by the first Carlton crew boss Gino Rosace and he named it after the Melbourne suburb in which it is based, Lygon Street, Carlton, commonly called "Little Italy". The organisation was a fierce rival to the Honoured Society and the Calabrese Family, both of which were Calabrian 'Ndrangheta groups also based in Melbourne, and were additionally allies of the mostly Irish Moran family. The Carlton Crew had a strong role in the infamous Melbourne gangland killings.

== History ==
The Carlton Crew included convicted criminals, Mick Gatto, Alphonse Gangitano, Mario Condello, Ron Bongetti, and Graham Kinniburgh, Dave Carlton. Gangitano built a reputation as "The Black Prince of Lygon Street" in the late 1970s and early 1980s. He recruited mainly Italian thugs who installed jukeboxes and vending machines in local bars and nightclubs under the threat of violence, and then reinvested their profits in drug trafficking.

In 1995, Melbourne police suspected Gangitano of two murders: small-time criminal Greg Workman and prostitute Deborah Boundy. Boundy was scheduled to testify in court, but died before the trial from a self-inflicted shot of undiluted heroin believed to have been supplied by Gangitano.

On 15 July 1995, Gangitano engaged in a melee with Jason Moran at a Melbourne nightclub. Prosecutors were still debating charges against him when Gangitano's wife found him dead in the laundry room of their Templestowe home on 16 January 1998; he had been shot several times in the head.

Mick Gatto succeeded Gangitano as the new street boss of the Carlton Crew later in 1998. In February 2002, a Royal Commission investigated Gatto on suspicion of accepting A$250,000 to mediate labour disputes with the Australian Workers' Union. In 2004, Gatto resigned as street boss. Gino, the then Carlton Crew boss, died in 2017 and was replaced by his close Consigliere Tony Madafferi in 2019. Tony Madafferi appointed David "The Guts" Smith as the new street boss later in 2019.

On 13 December 2003, Kinniburgh was murdered outside his home in Kew.

Carlton Crew member Mario Condello had a record of convictions for arson, fraud, and drug trafficking. Police also suspected him of multiple murders. In 2005, he was charged with plotting to murder crime boss Carl Williams, who also faced charges of scheming to ambush Condello. A trial for that case was pending when unknown gunmen murdered Condello outside his Brighton home on 6 February 2006. About 700 people attended his funeral, with Mick Gatto serving as a pallbearer.

== Notable members ==
- 1965-1975 – Gino Rosace: first boss
- 1982-1998 – Alphonse Gangitano: former street boss in Gino's reign, murdered in 1998
- 1980-2004 – Mick Gatto: arrested in 2004, former street boss in Gino's reign, 1998-2004, retired
- 1981-2006 – Mario Condello: arrested in 2005, murdered in 2006
- 1980s-2005 – Ron Bongetti: died of natural causes

== See also ==
- Crime in Melbourne
- Organised crime in Australia
- The Honoured Society
- Melbourne gangland killings
- Underbelly (TV series)
