= Domenico Papalia =

Italian criminal (1945–2026)

- Born: 18 April 1945; Platì, Calabria, Kingdom of Italy
- Died: 26 August 2026 (aged 81); Milan, Italy
- Other name: Micu
- Status: Deceased (Imprisoned from 1977)
- Allegiance: Papalia 'ndrina / 'Ndrangheta
- Penalty: Life imprisonment

Domenico Papalia (18 April 1945 – 26 August 2026), also known as Micu, was an Italian criminal and a member of the 'Ndrangheta, a Mafia-type criminal organisation in Calabria.

Alongside his brothers Antonio and Rocco, Domenico became a key figure in the expansion of the 'Ndrangheta from Calabria to Northern Italy during the 1970s, particularly in Milan and Lombardy as a whole. He also held the rank of mammasantissima, one of the highest ranks in the 'Ndrangheta.

== Biography ==
Originally from Platì, a small and isolated town in the Aspromonte mountains of Calabria, although not born into a traditional 'Ndrangheta family, Papalia inherited his criminal lineage maternally through the powerful Barbaro 'ndrina, one of the founding bloodlines of the local 'Ndrangheta system. Papalia was one of eight children of Giuseppe Papalia, known as ‘u Carciutu, and Serafina Barbaro, daughter of Francesco Barbaro, patriarch of the Barbaro criminal dynasty.

Following the death of the boss of Platì, Pasquale Agresta, in 1974, and amid a large wave of migration from Platì, the Papalia brothers settled in Northern Italy, where they established themselves as central players in the 'Ndrangheta operations. While officially residing in Rome, Domenico was closely connected to Buccinasco, a municipality near Milan that would become a stronghold of 'Ndrangheta activity in the North of Italy.

In December 1993, Papalia’s only son Pasqualino was killed by a stray bullet during New Year’s Eve celebrations in Platì. The event prompted national concern over a potential mafia feud. Though the shooter was never identified, Papalia, deeply affected, chose to donate his son’s organs, a gesture seen by some as proof of his complex personality.

He was in continuous custody from 1977. He was originally sentenced to life imprisonment in 1983 for the murder of 'Ndrangheta boss Totò D'Agostino, which occurred in Rome on 2 November 1976. Despite this conviction, Papalia was acquitted in 2017 by the Court of Appeal of Perugia for this particular murder, following ballistic evidence that proved he was not responsible for firing the fatal shot. Papalia's imprisonment was also linked to various other mafia-related charges. Throughout his incarceration, he was held under strict prison regimes, including extended periods in the Article 41-bis prison regime, which is reserved for high-risk mafia prisoners. Classified as an "ergastolano ostativo," ('one with an irreducible sentence') he was denied parole due to his organised crime affiliations, unless he cooperated with the justice system.

Known for his charisma, strict adherence to 'Ndrangheta codes, and close ties to other influential families such as the De Stefano 'ndrina, Papalia earned a reputation for leadership and mediation, even while incarcerated. Former associates described him as someone who maintained order within his community and continued to wield influence from prison.

Papalia was regarded as "one of the most influential figures in the entire Calabrian mafia organisation". Known as the boss of Milan, Lombardy, much of northern Italy, and the Aspromonte region in Calabria, he was the key figure that all clans expanding their operations to the north must contend with. Even in jail, the balance of power among the clans continued to pass through him.

After 49 years in prison, Papalia was released in July 2026 and placed under house arrest due to health issues; he later died on 26 August 2026, at the age of 81.
