= Antonio Papalia =

Italian criminal

- Born: 26 March 1954 (age 72); Platì, Calabria, Italy
- Other name: U Carciutu
- Children: 3
- Status: Imprisoned (since 1992)
- Allegiance: Papalia 'ndrina / 'Ndrangheta
- Convictions: Mafia association multiple murders
- Penalty: Life imprisonment

Antonio Papalia (born 26 March 1954) is an Italian criminal and a member of the 'Ndrangheta, a Mafia-type criminal organisation in Calabria.

Together with his brothers Domenico and Rocco, he led the Papalia 'ndrina, a sort of branch of the Barbaro 'ndrina, which has a strong presence in Northern Italy. Antonio Papalia has been regarded as the top-ranking leader of the 'Ndrangheta in Lombardy, holding the highest position of authority within the organization in the region.

== Biography ==
Antonio Papalia was born in Platì, a small town in Calabria, known as one of the historical strongholds of the ‘Ndrangheta, into a family partially connected to the organisation, as his mother, Serafina Barbaro, was the daughter of Francesco Barbaro, the patriarch of the Barbaro 'ndrina. In the 1970s, Papalia and his brothers Domenico and Rocco followed the huge wave of migration from Platì to Northern Italy, relocating to the Lombardy.

Papalia was the head of the "Camera di Controllo della Lombardia", the governing body of the ‘Ndrangheta clans in the Lombardy region. Known for his strategic acumen and decisive leadership, he remains a feared and respected figure within organized crime.

Papalina was arrested on 19 September 1992, and in 1997 three life sentences were confirmed under the 41-bis regime. Despite his incarceration, he pursued academic studies and poetry, earning literary awards during his imprisonment.

Papalia has been a central figure in major investigations into the ‘Ndrangheta’s presence in Northern Italy, particularly the “Nord-Sud” trial, which uncovered the 'Ndrangheta’s operations in Milan, and Buccinasco. He was convicted for ordering the 1984 murder of Adamo Perre, who was allegedly killed due to his cooperation with law enforcement against Papalia.

In October 2024, Domenico Papalia, known as Domenichino, son of Antonio Papalia, was arrested in a major drug trafficking investigation involving over 50 suspects. According to the investigation, based on encrypted communications obtained through the EncroChat platform, Papalia played a direct role in coordinating cocaine shipments from Northern Europe, particularly Belgium, into Lombardy. He resides between Platì, in Calabria, and Motta Visconti, near Pavia. His name also appeared in the “Doppia Curva” probe into mafia influence within football ultras groups, due to alleged connections with individuals linked to the leadership of AC Milan’s Curva Sud, though no mafia-related charges were formally brought in that context.
