= Tito Angelini =

Italian sculptor (1806–1878)

Tito Angelini (1806–1878) was an Italian sculptor and leader of the Academy of Fine Arts in Naples, where he was born and died.

== Biography ==
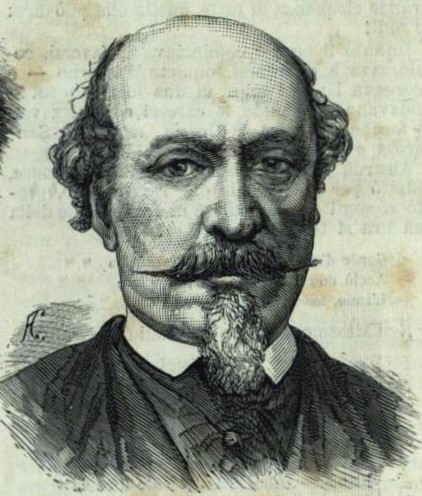
Tito Angelini

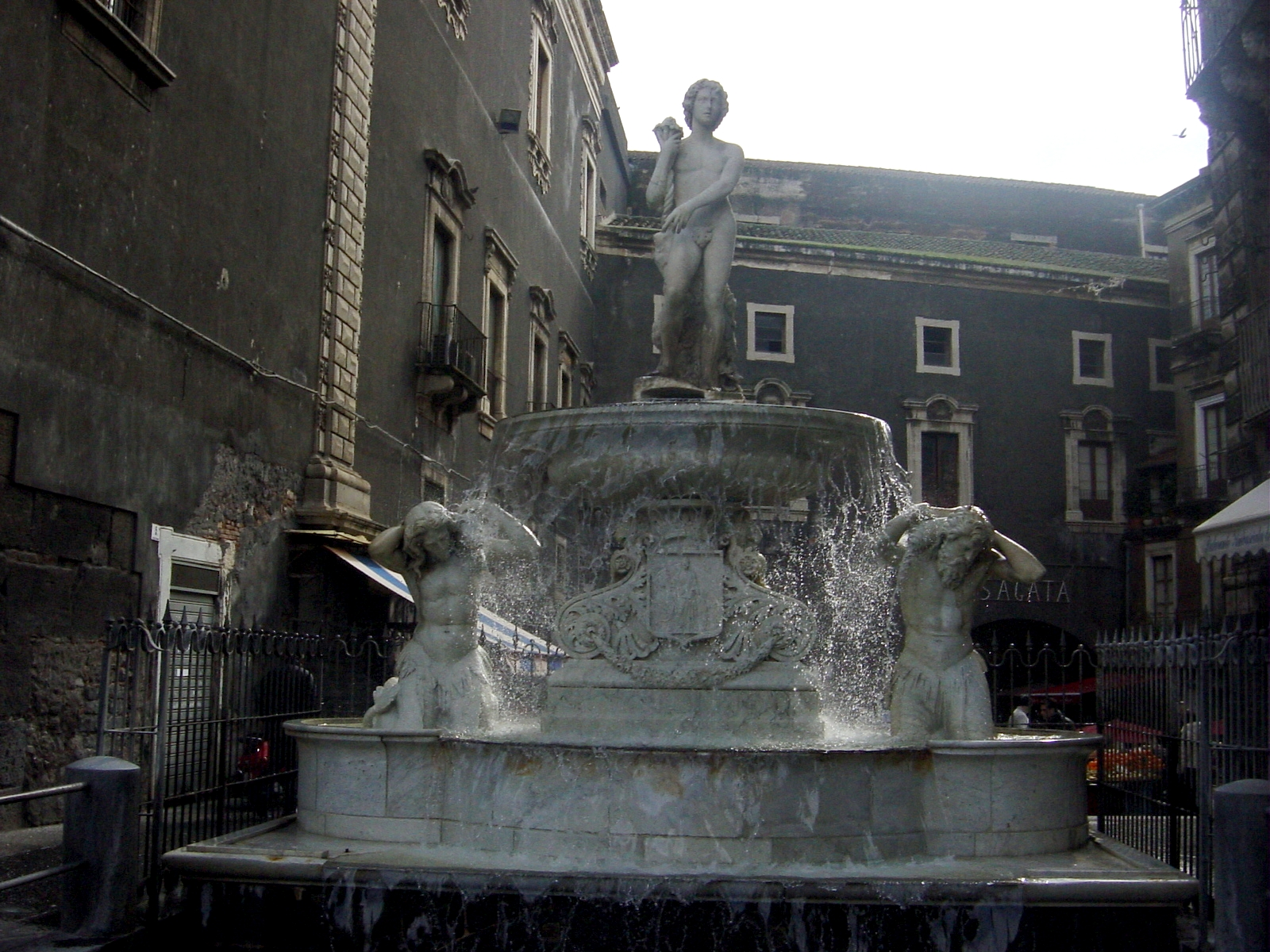
Fountain of the River Amenano in the Piazza del Duomo, Catania

His father, Costanzo Angelini, born in Aquila in 1771, was educated in Rome and became a Neapolitan citizen, member of the Royal Academy of Fine Arts, and professor of design there.

His studies in Rome led to an influence by the pre-eminent Neoclassic sculptors of his day, Canova and the Danish Thorvaldsen. He is said to have become master of the academy during Napoleonic occupation of Italy. Afterwards, he was to share duties with Giuseppe Cammarano.

He befriended Pietro Tenerani, Luigi Pampaloni, and Lorenzo Bartolini during his travels, but was mainly active in Naples, where he became Professor of Design. He completed the works of La Clemenza e L'Immacolata for the chapel of the Palazzo Reale of Naples. He also completed the funereal monument for Lucia Migliaccio for the church of San Ferdinando, and the monuments to Saverio Mercadante and Giuseppe Mazzini and the statue of Sant'Ambrogio for the church of San Francesco in Gaeta. His works are also to be seen in museums in Naples and Campagna. Among his pupils was Salvatore Albano.

Other works can be found at the Royal Palace of Caserta, for example the reliefs in the Alexander Room or the statues in the Throne room.

== Sources ==
- Archivi di Teatro Napoli. "Foto di Tito Angelini".
