= Salvatore Albano =

Italian sculptor

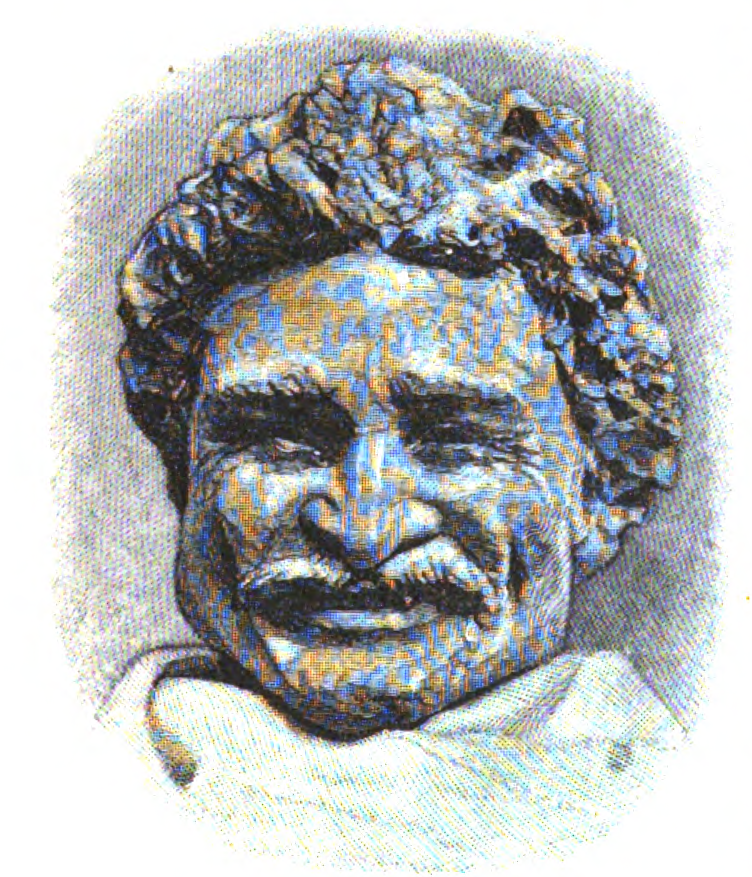
- self-portrait
- Born: 29 May 1841; Oppido Mamertina
- Died: 13 October 1893 (aged 52); Florence
- Occupation: Sculptor

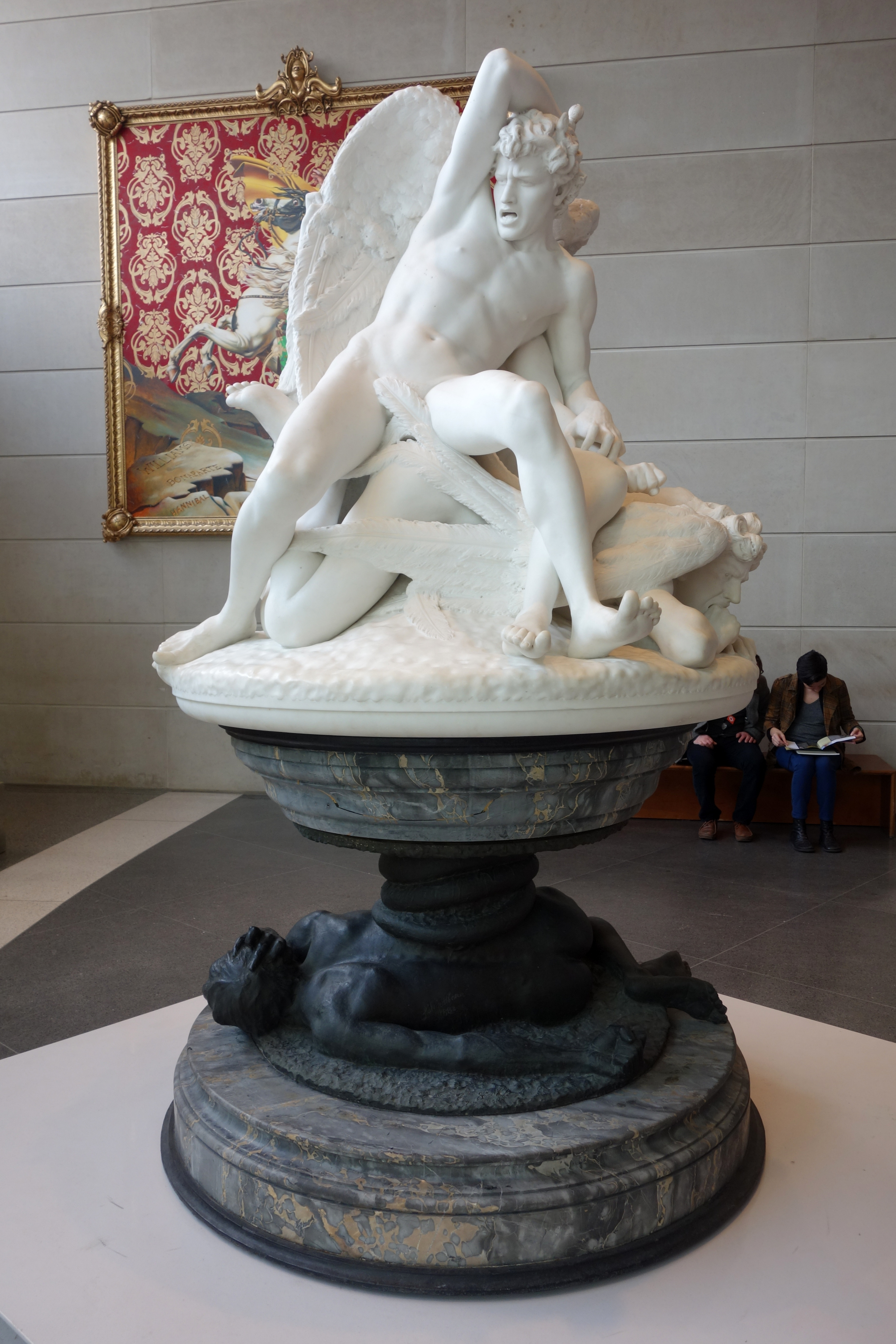
The Fallen Angels by Salvatore Albano, 1893

Salvatore Albano (May 29, 1841 – October 13, 1893) was an Italian sculptor.

He was born in Oppido Mamertina in Calabria, southern Italy, to parents of limited means. He began in Calabria as a sculptor of wooden Presepi or Nativity scenes. Because of his talent, his townspeople gave him a stipend to study in Naples. There he trained under a cavalier Sorbille, also from Calabria. After a year, he trained in the local Accademia under its director Tito Angelini. In 1865, his native province continued his stipend of 60 lire per year for three years. He won a number of contests in his Naples. In 1867, he submitted his Resurrection of Lazarus and a Cain to an exposition in Rome. He moved to Florence by 1869, and spent the remainder of his career there.

As a young man, he completed a Conte Ugolino bought by Marchese Agostino Sergio. Among his other works are:

- Tears and Flowers (1864)
- Moses in Anger smashes the Tablets with the Commandments (1864, Capodimonte)
- Christ nell'Orto (1865)
- Masaniello (1866, Accademia)
- Eve (1869, Florence)
- Gioachino Rossini- bust (1869, Florence)
- Ariadne abandoned (1870)
- Il Genio di Michelangelo for Baron di Talleyrand.
- Venere Mendicante
- The Fallen Angels (1893, in the Brooklyn Museum)
