= Saverio Mammoliti =

Italian criminal

Saverio Mammoliti (Italian pronunciation: [saˈvɛːrjo mammoˈliːti]; born January 13, 1942), also known as Saro, is an Italian criminal and member of the 'Ndrangheta. He was the capobastone (head of command) of the Mammoliti 'ndrina based in Oppido Mamertina and Castellace in Calabria. In 2003, he became an informant when he decided to collaborate with Italian justice. Saro Mammoliti's nickname was the "playboy of Castellace" for his good looks and taste in women.

== 'Ndrangheta heritage ==
Mammoliti was born in a historical crime family in the Gioia Tauro plain. The Mammoliti 'ndrina was based in Castelacce. His father Francesco Mammoliti was killed in October 1954 in a feud with the Barbaro 'ndrina. His brother Vincenzo Mammoliti, took over the command of the clan seconded by their other brother Antonino Mammoliti. After Vincenzo’s death in August 1988, Saro succeeded him.

Unlike the more traditional rural image often associated with the 'Ndrangheta, Saro Mammoliti cultivated a different public persona in Reggio Calabria and Rome, known for his style of dressing and his Jaguar. This contributed to his nickname, the 'playboy of Castellace.'

In December 1972 he escaped from custody in relation the long-running feud with the Barbaro clan, and lived more or less openly without fear of recapture for the next 20 years. In 1975, while officially a fugitive, he married the 15-year-old Maria Caterina Nava at Castellace's parish church next to the local police station, and he subsequently visited each of his new-born children at the local hospital.

In 1973, Mammoliti was charged of heroin trafficking when an undercover operation by the US Federal Bureau of Narcotics (FBN) targeting Mammoliti revealed that he needed permission of Antonio Macrì and Girolamo Piromalli. He was seen in Tangiers (Morocco) and Amsterdam (the Netherlands) – hubs in international drug trafficking – and allegedly invested his criminal proceeds in hotel construction at the Calabrian coast.

== Getty kidnap ==
Mammoliti was one of the men charged with the kidnap of John Paul Getty III on July 10, 1973, in Rome. Police considered him to be "very close to the brain, or rather brains, behind the plot," including Piromalli. Nine men eventually were arrested. Two were convicted and sent to prison. The others, including Piromalli and Mammoliti, were acquitted for lack of evidence. However, Mammoliti, a fugitive at the time, was convicted for drug trafficking.

The ransom initially demanded was $17 million (equivalent to $123 million in 2025) for his safe return. However, the family suspected a ploy by the rebellious teenager to extract money from his miserly grandfather. John Paul Getty Jr. asked his father J. Paul Getty for the money, but was refused, arguing that his 13 other grandchildren could also become kidnap targets if he paid.

In November 1973, an envelope containing a lock of hair and a human ear arrived at a daily newspaper. The second demand had been delayed three weeks by an Italian postal strike. The demand threatened that Paul would be further mutilated unless the victims paid $3.2 million. The demand stated "This is Paul's ear. If we don't get some money within 10 days, then the other ear will arrive. In other words, he will arrive in little bits."

When the kidnappers finally reduced their demands to $3 million, Getty agreed to pay no more than $2.2 million (equivalent to $16 million in 2025), the maximum that would be tax-deductible. He lent his son the remaining $800,000 at four percent interest. Getty's grandson was found alive on December 15, 1973, in a Lauria filling station, in the province of Potenza, shortly after the ransom was paid. Getty III was permanently affected by the trauma and became a drug addict. After a stroke brought on by a cocktail of drugs and alcohol in 1981, Getty III was rendered speechless, nearly blind and partially paralyzed for the rest of his life. He died on February 5, 2011, at the age of 54.

The ransom money was invested in the trucks with which the 'Ndrangheta won all the transportation contracts for the container port of Gioia Tauro. After he decided to collaborate with Italian justice, Mammoliti confessed to have been involved in the kidnap.

The Mammoliti clan also 'persuaded' local landowners to sell them their lands at giveaway prices, or to rent it to them for next to nothing - or the clan simply fenced it in and treated it as its own.

== More trouble with the law ==
In 1982, he was convicted to 33 years in jail at the Maxi Trial against the 'Ndrangheta, only to have it quashed by the Supreme Court. He was arrested on June 9, 1984, charged with homicide.

He did not stay behind bars for long, however. He supposedly had friends in high places: the telephone numbers of the prime minister's office and various Rome ministries were once found in his possession. He has had his property seized then handed back.

== Arrest ==
He was arrested again on June 1, 1992, together with his wife Maria Caterina Nava and three others. At the time he was considered to be the number two of the 'Ndrangheta in the Gioia Tauro plain, next to Giuseppe Peppino Piromalli.

Released for insufficient proof he was arrested again on August 31, 1992. Charges include allegations of the murder of baron Antonio Francesco Cordopatri, whose lands had been effectively seized by the Mammoliti-clan; six bomb attacks; 19 arson attacks; the destruction of 1,100 olive, citrus and kiwi trees in 15 separate incursions, and 14 instances of agricultural equipment stolen.

He was sent down for 22 years for extortion and other Mafia-related charges. In 1995, he received a life sentence in the trial against the "Mafia of three provinces".

== Pentito ==
In May 2003, Mammoliti decided to collaborate with the Italian justice and became a pentito. Nevertheless, he received another 20 years sentence for his role in the Oppidio feud between rival clans over the control of the area.

== In popular culture ==
Mammoliti was portrayed by Marco Leonardi in the 2017 film All the Money in the World.

== Sources ==
- Arlacchi, Pino (1988). Mafia Business. The Mafia ethic and the spirit of capitalism, Oxford: Oxford University Press ISBN 0-19-285197-7
- (in Italian) Gratteri, Nicola & Antonio Nicaso (2006). Fratelli di Sangue, Cosenza: Luigi Pellegrini Editore ISBN 88-8101-373-8
- Paoli, Letizia (2003). Mafia Brotherhoods: Organized Crime, Italian Style, Oxford/New York: Oxford University Press ISBN 0-19-515724-9
