= Loan shark (disambiguation) =

A loan shark is an individual who loans money at high interest.

Loan shark and Loanshark may also refer to:

- Loan Shark (film), a 1952 American crime film noir
- Loanshark (film), a 1999 American crime film
- "Loan Shark" (The Bill), a 1986 television episode

== See also ==
- "Loanshark Blues", a song from the Rory Gallagher album Defender
