= Mariano Agate =

Member of the Sicilian Mafia

- Mariano Agate, Mafia boss of Mazara del Vallo
- Born: Mariano Agate; 19 May 1939; Mazara del Vallo, Sicily, Italy
- Died: 3 April 2013 (aged 73); Mazara del Vallo, Sicily, Italy
- Occupation: Mafia boss
- Years active: 1970s–2013
- Organization: Sicilian Mafia
- Known for: Boss of the Mazara del Vallo Mafia family
- Opponent: Antimafia
- Children: Epifanio Agate
- Status: Deceased
- Conviction: Life imprisonment
- Criminal charges: Murder, drug trafficking, organized crime
- Penalty: Life sentence
- Accomplices: Totò Riina, Corleonesi, 'Ndrangheta clans

Mariano Agate (19 May 1939 in Mazara del Vallo – 3 April 2013 in Mazara del Vallo) was a member of the Sicilian Mafia. He was the boss of Mazara del Vallo Mafia family since the 1970s when he replaced the old boss Mariano Licari. He also was the boss of the mandamento of Mazara, including the Mafia families of Marsala, Salemi and Vita. Agate was a member of "Iside", one of the most powerful local Masonic lodges.

In the 1980s, Agate supported the Corleonesi faction during the Second Mafia War and became the most important ally of Totò Riina in the province of Trapani. He also became a member of the Sicilian Mafia Commission.

Agate was arrested in 1982 for heroin trafficking. In 1985 he was sentenced to life for several murders, including those of judge Giacomo Ciaccio Montalto and the mayor of Castelvetrano, Vito Lipari. Agate was arrested again in 1992, after his release the year before. He was sentenced for life for the murders of the Antimafia judges Giovanni Falcone and Paolo Borsellino.

In the 1990s, members of his clan worked together with the 'Ndrangheta clan headed by Giuseppe Morabito from Africo to import hashish from Morocco and cocaine from Latin America.

Despite being jailed, in 2004 he was accused of running an international cocaine trafficking ring with several 'Ndrangheta clans (the Marando, Trimboli and Barbaro clans from Platì in particular), supported by his son Epifanio Agate and Salvatore Miceli, a fugitive in Colombia. Although incarcerated under the strict 41-bis prison regime he instructed his son on how to run the business.

Agate died at home on 3 April 2013. He had been granted house arrest for serious health reasons. Agate was ill for some time with cancer. The authorities banned a public funeral to guarantee public order and security.

== Bibliography ==
- Stille, Alexander (1995).Excellent Cadavers. The Mafia and the Death of the First Italian Republic, New York: Vintage ISBN 0-09-959491-9
