= Cocaine Coup =

Cocaine Coup is a term that has been applied to:

- 1980 Bolivian coup d'état of Luis García Meza Tejada
- 1978 Honduran coup d'état of Policarpo Paz García
