= Oppido Mamertina =

Oppido Mamertina Oppidù / Ofidus (Greek)
- Comune
- Comune di Oppido Mamertina
- Coat of arms

- Location of Oppido Mamertina in Italy Oppido Mamertina (Calabria)
- Coordinates: 38°18′N 15°59′E
- Country: Italy
- Region: Calabria
- Metropolitan city: Reggio Calabria (RC)
- Frazioni: Castellace, Messignadi, Piminoro, Tresilico

Government
  - Mayor: Giuseppe Morizzi

Area
  - Total: 58 km^{2} (22 sq mi)
- Elevation: 342 m (1,122 ft)

Population (December 2023)
  - Total: 4,850
  - Density: 84/km^{2} (220/sq mi)
- Demonym: Oppidesi
- Time zone: UTC+1 (CET)
  - Summer (DST): UTC+2 (CEST)
- Postal code: 89014
- Dialing code: 0966
- Patron saint: Annunciation
- Saint day: 25 March
- Website: Official website

Oppido Mamertina (Calabrian Greek: Oppidù, Ofidus) is a town and comune of the province of Reggio Calabria in Calabria in southern Italy at about 62 kilometres (39 mi) northeast of Reggio Calabria and about 120 kilometres (75 mi) southwest of Catanzaro.

It is the seat of the Diocese of Oppido Mamertina.

The municipality includes the following boroughs (frazioni): Castellace, Messignadi, Piminoro, and Tresilico.

== History ==
The Taurani, Oscan-speaking Italic people from Bruttii, built a large town at the site of Mella near the present Oppido Vecchio in the 4th c. BC after taking over peacefully from Greek Locri, some 15 miles away. who had controlled the area.

The Greek influence in the town is shown by the street plan, building styles and many Greek coins. Later after supporting Hannibal in the 2nd Punic War (218–201 BC), the Tauriani returned to the protection of the Romans who later expanded the town.

The first mention of the town (Oppidum in Latin, meaning citadel) is 1040, during the Byzantine Era.

The town is famous for its prolonged resistance before falling to Roger the Norman in 1056.

On February 5, 1783, an earthquake completely destroyed the town killing 1,198 people. The town was rebuilt near the neighbouring village Tresilico (incorporated in the municipality in 1927). Other earthquakes hit the town in 1894 and on December 28, 1908, which destroyed the neighbouring township Castellace.

== Climate ==
Oppido Mamertina enjoys a true subtropical climate with hot summers and very mild winters. The average temperature of the coldest month is around 15°C, while the warmest months exceed 30°C. Indeed, despite being located at an altitude of 300 meters, and even though most weather stations are located at 200-250 meters in the agricultural municipal area, the climate is directly influenced by three main factors, which cause this climatic "anomaly" toward warm conditions. First, the Gulf of Gioia Tauro, from which the prevailing winds originate, has a sea temperature that never drops below 17°C in the coldest period (a true exception among Italian seas, for which the exact reason is still unknown, but the most widely accepted hypothesis is that it stems from the submarine canyon orography and the constant upwelling of marine and salt currents from the southern Ionian Sea, which enters through the Strait of Messina). Secondly, the orography in the direction of the prevailing winds is complex, consisting of slopes and hills that adiabatically warm the prevailing westerly wind. Finally, the last factor is the slope of the area, exposed to the southwest and forming an angle of approximately 45-50° perpendicular to the sun (although some agricultural areas form an angle of up to 60° to the sun). These three factors, taken together, contribute to Oppido Mamertina's climate being an advanced subtropical one, similar to the Pelagian Islands, the southernmost coasts of Europe, and the coast around Lido di Palmi (in fact, despite all the microclimatic characteristics, the 300 meters above sea level are a significant factor in ensuring that Oppido Mamertina does not have higher winter averages than the nearest coasts). In addition to these characteristics, there are other conditions that allow the area to warm up easily, such as fohn winds coming from the SW, SSW, S, SSE, E, ENE, NE, NNE (unlike these, however, the sirocco proper, the full SE, does not cause detectable foehn effects, so much so that with this wind, Oppido Mamertina is thermometrically aligned with the other 300-metre areas of southern Calabria). Average annual precipitation is around 500 mm, with a high variability (very dry years with rainfall below 300 mm or very rainy years with rainfall around 700-800 mm are possible, especially in years when frequent Mediterranean cyclogeneses form).

Climate data for Oppido Mamertina (1900–2025)
Month	Jan	Feb	Mar	Apr	May	Jun	Jul	Aug	Sep	Oct	Nov	Dec	Year
Record high °C (°F)	33.0 (91.4)	33.2 (91.8)	37.0 (98.6)	39.4 (102.9)	43.4 (110.1)	48.2 (118.8)	48.3 (118.9)	48.5 (119.3)	46.9 (116.4)	45.5 (113.9)	38.6 (101.5)	33.8 (92.8)	48.5 (119.3)
Mean daily maximum °C (°F)	17.7 (63.9)	18.0 (64.4)	20.2 (68.4)	23.3 (73.9)	28.1 (82.6)	32.8 (91.0)	35.8 (96.4)	35.9 (96.6)	32.9 (91.2)	29.4 (84.9)	23.0 (73.4)	19.7 (67.5)	26.4 (79.5)
Mean daily minimum °C (°F)	11.3 (52.3)	11.3 (52.3)	12.2 (54.0)	14.5 (58.1)	17.9 (64.2)	22.8 (73.0)	25.8 (78.4)	26.1 (79.0)	23.3 (73.9)	21.0 (69.8)	15.4 (59.7)	12.5 (54.5)	17.8 (64.1)
Record low °C (°F)	1.0 (33.8)	0.2 (32.4)	3.4 (38.1)	6.7 (44.1)	10.3 (50.5)	14.0 (57.2)	17.8 (64.0)	18.0 (64.4)	15.2 (59.4)	11.0 (51.8)	6.9 (44.4)	1.6 (34.9)	0.2 (32.4)
Source 1:
Source 2:

== Economy ==
The economy is based on agriculture, in particular olive groves and the production of olive oil, as well citrus orchards in the plain. Forestry and sheep husbandry are also sources of income.

== Cathedral of Oppido Mamertina ==
The cathedral of Oppido Mamertina is the seat of the bishop's chair and as such is the mother church of the diocese of Oppido Mamertina-Palmi. Dedicated to Maria Assunta, in neoclassical style, it is among the largest sacred buildings in Calabria and with its 33 meters stands out above all others in height. The bell tower (not yet completely completed), designed by the engineer Pasquale Epifanio and begun by the bishop Domenico Crusco in September 1997, dominates the plain of Gioia Tauro with its 50.10 meters of height and is, presumably, the tallest building in Calabria.

The cathedral sanctuary Maria SS. Annunziata is twinned with the Basilica of the Annunciation in Nazareth

== Demographic evolution ==
Historical population

Year	Pop.	±%
1861	8,666	—
1871	7,614	−12.1%
1881	7,780	+2.2%
1901	9,090	+16.8%
1911	10,126	+11.4%

Year	Pop.	±%
1921	10,765	+6.3%
1931	10,842	+0.7%
1936	11,138	+2.7%
1951	11,444	+2.7%
1961	9,864	−13.8%

Year	Pop.	±%
1971	7,710	−21.8%
1981	6,465	−16.1%
1991	6,252	−3.3%
2001	5,559	−11.1%

Source: Data from ISTAT

The population halved during the last century. Many inhabitants moved to the industrial centres in northern Italy or joined the Italian diaspora to escape the extreme poverty.

== Notable people ==
- Salvatore Albano (1841-1893), sculptor
- Rocky Gattellari (1941-2023), boxer, Olympian, political candidate and businessman
- Saverio Mammoliti (born 1942), 'Ndrangheta boss
- Alessio Viola (born 1990), footballer
