= Illegal drug trade in Latin America =

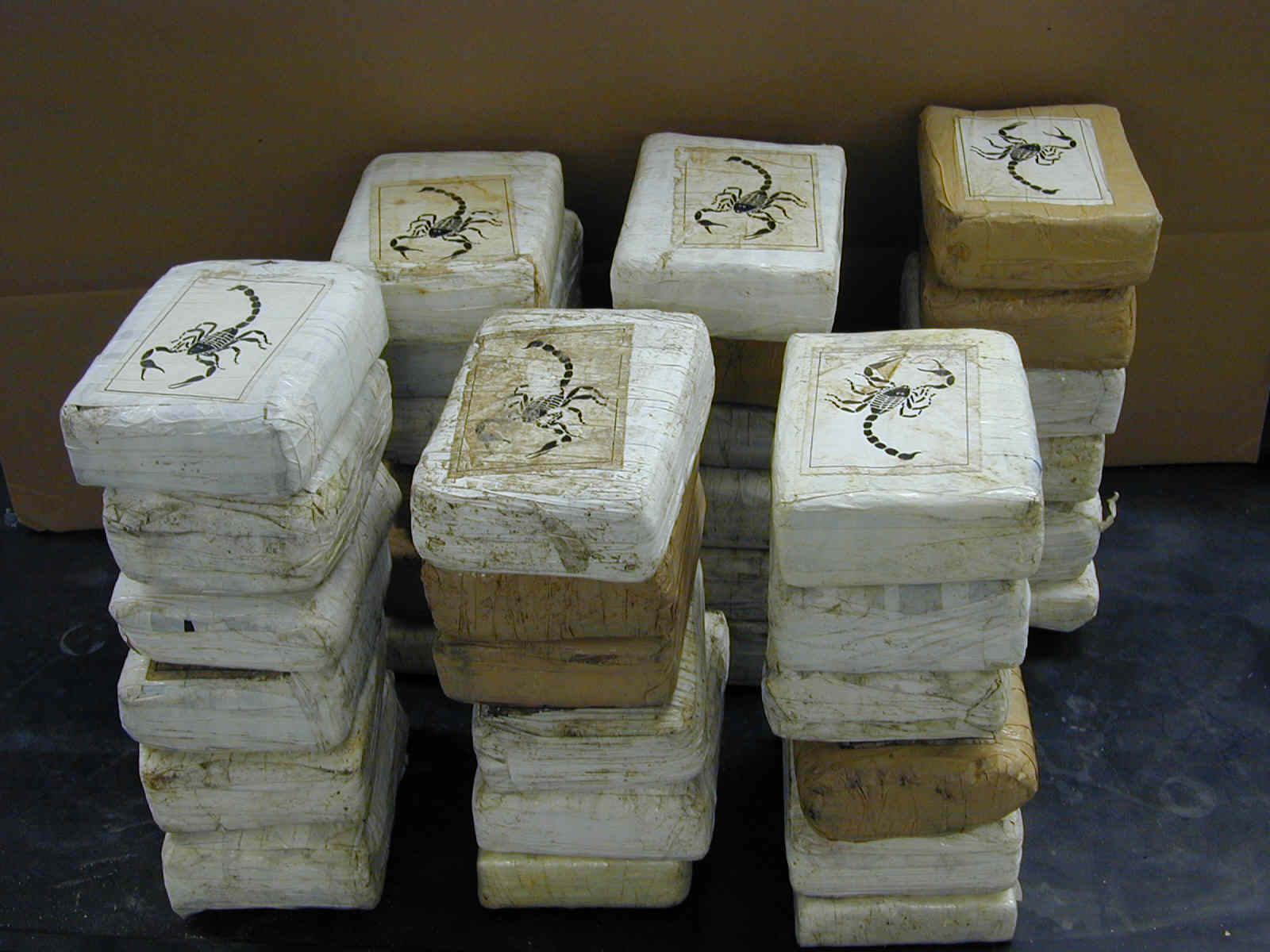
Bricks of cocaine, a form in which it is commonly transported.

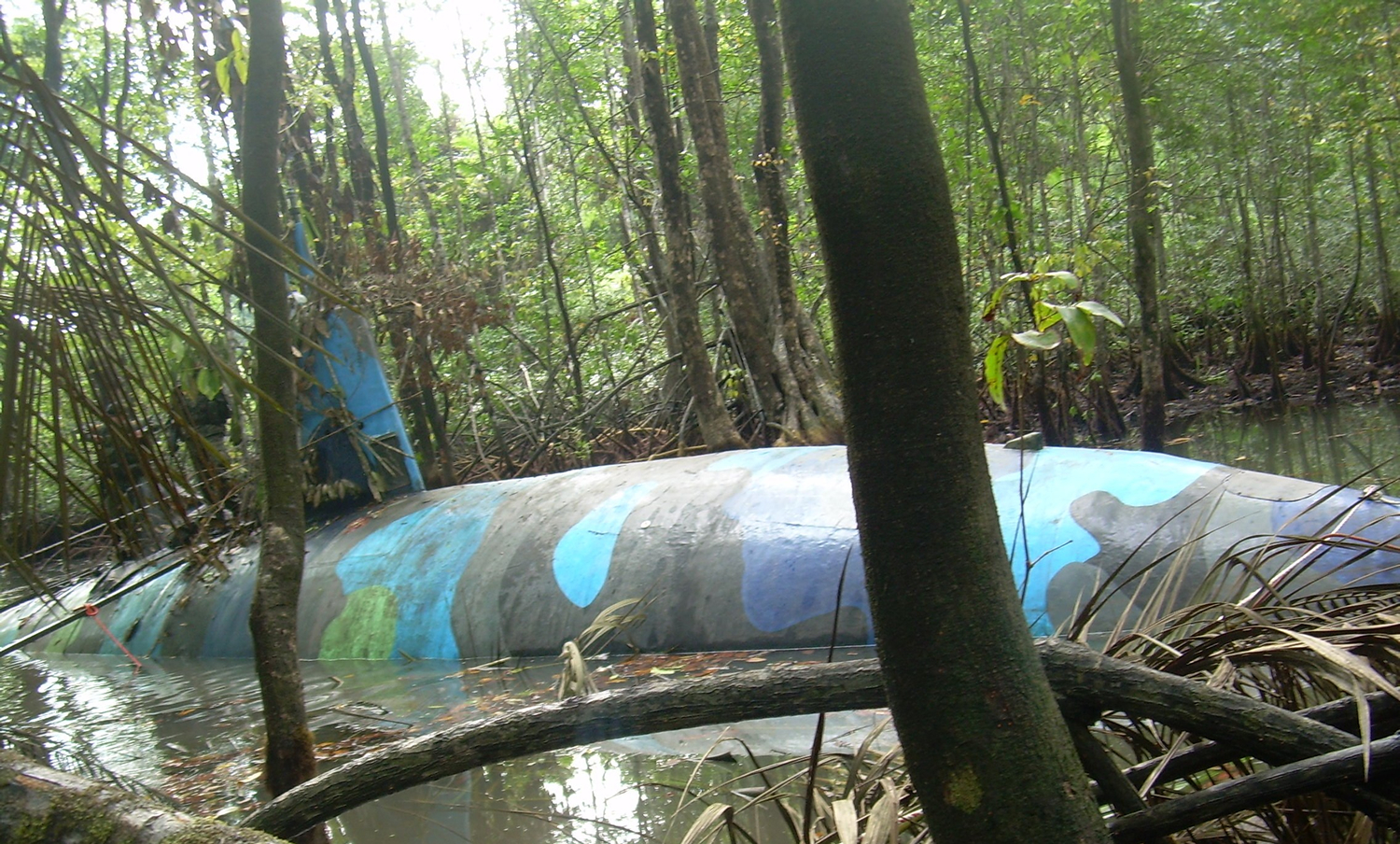
A fully operational submarine built for the primary purpose of transporting multi-ton quantities of cocaine located near a tributary close to the Ecuador/Colombia border that was seized by the Ecuador Anti-Narcotics Police Forces and Ecuador Military authorities with the assistance of the U.S. DEA.

The illegal drug trade in Latin America concerns primarily the production and sale of cocaine and cannabis, including the export of these banned substances to the United States and Europe. According to United Nations Office on Drugs and Crime (UNODC), the coca cultivation is concentrated in the Andes of South America, particularly in Colombia, Peru and Bolivia; this is the world's only source region for coca.

Drug consumption in Latin America remains relatively low, but cocaine in particular has increased in recent years in countries along the major smuggling routes. As of 2008, the primary pathway for drugs into the United States is through Mexico and Central America, though crackdowns on drug trafficking by the Mexican government has forced many cartels to operate routes through Guatemala and Honduras instead. This is a shift from the 1980s and early 90s, when the main smuggling route was via the Caribbean into Florida. The United States is the primary destination, but around 25 to 30% of global cocaine production travels from Latin America to Europe, typically via West Africa.

The major drug trafficking organizations (drug cartels) are Mexican and Colombian, and said to generate a total of $18 to $39bn in wholesale drug proceeds per year. Mexican cartels are currently considered the "greatest organized crime threat" to the United States. Since February 2010, the major Mexican cartels have again aligned in two factions, one integrated by the Juárez Cartel, Tijuana Cartel, Los Zetas and the Beltrán-Leyva Cartel; the other faction integrated by the Gulf Cartel, Sinaloa Cartel and La Familia Cartel.

Prior to the Mexican cartels' rise, the Colombian Cali cartel and Medellín cartel dominated in the late 1980s and early 90s. Following their demise, the Norte del Valle cartel has filled the Colombian vacuum, along with rightwing paramilitaries (e.g. United Self-Defense Forces of Colombia, AUC) and leftwing insurgent groups (FARC, ELN).

As a result of the concentration of drug trafficking, Latin America and the Caribbean has the world's highest crime rates, with murder reaching 32.6 per 100,000 of population in 2008. Violence has surged in Mexico since 2006 when Mexican President Felipe Calderón intensified the Mexican drug war.

== United States and Latin American drug control ==
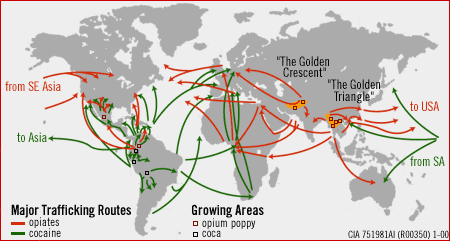
International drug routes.

The United States war on drugs in Latin America began with the Nixon Administration. This led to large amounts of US funding and manpower being dedicated to help stop the Latin American production of drugs and slow the flow of drugs coming into the United States from Latin America. One major milestone in the efforts for both Latin American countries and the United States was the signing of extradition treaties for drug traffickers. This has led to notable traffickers and kingpins like El Chapo (Joaquín Archivaldo Guzmán Loera) being imprisoned in the United States.

Drug trafficking from Latin America has played a major role in the United States for the past 50 years. This was notably seen in Miami when cocaine production skyrocketed in the 1970s.

Since 2008, the U.S. Congress has supported the Central American Regional Security Initiative (CARSI) with approximately $800 million to "fund programs for narcotics interdiction, strengthening law enforcement and justice institutions and violence prevention through work with at-risk youth". The CARSI offers equipment (vehicles and communication equipment), technical support and guidance to counter drug trade. The program also supports special units that cooperate with the U.S. Drug Enforcement Administration in Guatemala and Honduras to investigate drug cartels, share intelligence, and promote regional collaboration.

=== Colombia ===
For more than ten years, the U.S. has been funding Plan Colombia, which aims to combat illegal drugs production in the country, especially the growing of coca, the plant from which cocaine is produced. Former President Obama's top drug policy adviser, R. Gil Kerlikowske, announced a drug plan in May 2010 emphasizing prevention and treatment in the United States.

=== Peru ===
The administration has left financing for eradication projects in the Andes largely unchanged, despite debate over whether such efforts can sharply restrict the supply of cocaine or significantly increase the price in the United States in the long run. American anti-narcotics aid for Peru stands at $71.7 million this year, slightly higher than last year's $70.7 million. American anti-narcotics officials operate from a newly expanded Peruvian police base in Tingo María, overseeing Peruvian teams that fan out to nearby valleys to cut down coca bushes by hand.

=== Guatemala ===
The U.S. has worked with Guatemalan authorities to clamp down on South American cocaine routes, many of which use Guatemala as a landing zone. In October 2013, the US supplied six twin-engine "Super Huey" helicopters to Guatemala in an effort to halt illegal air traffic.

=== Mexico ===
Mexico is estimated to be the world's third largest producer of opium with poppy cultivation. It also is a major supplier of heroin and the largest foreign supplier of marijuana, cocaine and methamphetamine to the U.S. market. These drugs are supplied by Drug Trafficking Organizations (DTOs). The U.S. government estimates that Mexican DTOs gain tens of billions of dollars each year from drug sales in the U.S. alone.

DTOs are continually battling for control of territory in Mexico used for the cultivation, importation and transportation of illicit drugs. The U.S. government considers groups affiliated with DTOs a significant threat to the safety within the U.S. The Drug Enforcement Administration (DEA) enforces 'the controlled substances laws and regulations of the US and pursues organizations and members involved in the growing, manufacture, or distribution of controlled substances appearing in or destined for illicit traffic in the U.S.'. The Mexican DTOs that pose the biggest threat to the US, according to the DEA, are the Sinaloa Cartel, Jalisco New Generation Cartel, Juarez Cartel, Gulf Cartel, Los Zetas Cartel and the Beltran-Leyva Organization.

In 2007, the U.S. launched the Merida initiative, a bilateral partnership that supports Mexico's law enforcement, helps to counteract the illegal trade in narcotics and strengthens border security. The four main focuses of this initiative are 'disrupting organized criminal groups; institutionalizing the rule of law; creating a 21st-century border, and building strong and resilient communities'. More recently, the initiative focused on improving security around Mexico's southern border and countering the production and trafficking of heroin and fentanyl. Until March 2017, more than $1.6bn has been invested in the Merida initiative, of which almost $900,000 was spent on protective equipment necessary for the secured demolishing of narcotic labs.

In Mexico, the DEA combats operations of DTOs by conducting bilateral investigations with foreign counterparts, providing investigative assistance and leads to DEA domestic offices and other agencies, providing training and technical equipment to 'host nation participants to initiate and carry out complex criminal investigations, providing assistance in developing drug control laws and regulations, and providing training and material support to foreign law enforcement counterparts'.

=== Illicit Opium Market in Guerrero ===
==== Lead section ====
The illicit opium market in Guerrero is a result of numerous socioeconomic conditions like poverty and state neglect that have been influenced by political involvement such as government militarization, increasing state and political violence. The market functions at local, state, and institutional levels within various under-developed regions while impacting cultural traditions and community peace.

==== History of opium production ====
Despite the social and cultural costs, communities in Guerrero such as La Sierra and La Montaña have continuously relied on the illegal opiate market as their primary source of income. Historical dispossession in Guerrero has weakened economic stability in under-developed regions including Atoyac de Álvarez and Ayutla de los Libres.

===== Socioeconomic and political transformation =====
The lack of economic stability transformed the opium poppy cultivation into an economic market through government militarization. Government agencies and agents took control over poppy production which was influenced by state militarization and regulation. Rather than solely existing within the criminal system, the illicit opium market began to function within political and military powers. These powers were an attempt of counterinsurgency in which they relied on militarization to fight illicit crops that violated human rights. The involvement of both criminal and capitalist parties influenced the drug war in Guerrero through reshaping the political economy and increasing the risks of violence and crime.

===== Homicide rates in Guerrero from 2012-2024 =====
According to official homicide data from INEGI (Instituto Nacional de Estadística y Geografía), Guerrero reported consistently high homicide rates between 2012 and 2024, reflecting the broader instability associated with drug market activity and militarization in the region.

	2012	2013	2014	2015	2016	2017	2018	2019	2020	2021	2022	2023	2024
Guerrero	2,646	2,283	1,729	2,424	2,594	2,637	2,367	1,937	1,507	1,468	1,404	1,743	1,716

The homicide data indicates the illicit opium market is associated with structural violence in Guerrero.

=== Puerto Rico ===
See: Illegal drugs in Puerto Rico

== Legalization debate ==
Latin American leaders, including the presidents of Colombia, Guatemala and Mexico, have called for debate about legalizing and regulating aspects of drug production, trade or use. Some Latin leaders are discussing the need to experiment further with decriminalizing possession of drugs. Lawmakers are also proposing to scrap jail terms for growing coca and cannabis. As some Latin American leaders call for legalization of narcotics, Peru, a leading coca grower, remains opposed.

== Drugs and government corruption ==
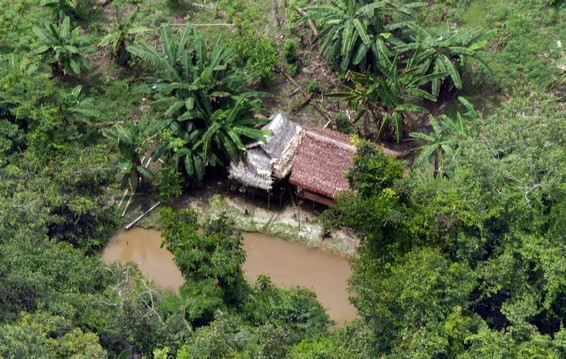
A Brazilian cocaine production site in the Amazon rainforest.

Several Latin American and Caribbean countries have, at times, faced allegation governments involvement in the illegal drug trade the 1970s and 1980s.In 1978 and 1980, so called "cocaine coups" in Honduras and Bolivia brought such governments to power that were linked to drug trafficking networks (see illegal drug trade in Honduras and illegal drug trade in Bolivia). In Panama, Manuel Noriega, a long-term drug trafficker, served as a head of military from 1983 to 1989, during which he maintained ties with the CIA.

The Colombian parapolitics scandal revealed links between parts of the Colombian establishment and the United Self-Defense Forces of Colombia (AUC), a paramilitary group responsible for killing tens of thousands of Colombian civilians, which controls over 75% of the Colombian cocaine trade. The illegal drug trade in Peru was until 2000 shaped by Vladimiro Montesinos's involvement; he had been head of the country's intelligence service since 1990.

In 2010 it was alleged that the Mexican Sinaloa cartel had used bribery to co-opt the federal government and focus the government's anti-drug efforts on its competitors. According to Peter Dale Scott, "The Guadalajara Cartel, Mexico's most powerful drug-trafficking network in the early 1980s, prospered largely because it enjoyed the protection of the DFS, under its chief Miguel Nazar Haro, a CIA asset."

Now, in the 21st century, there are still major issues with government corruption in Latin America. In Latin America 62% of people believe that the level of corruption had risen in the last 12 months according to a study in 2017. People feel this way due to a number of ways in which governments use corruption to gain money and power at the expense of their people. In Venezuela the Maduro regime has been known to allow transnational criminal organizations. This is along with money laundering, or illicit finance, which keeps money in the pockets of criminals and government officials instead of the people.

== See also ==
- Cannabis in Spain
- Crime and violence in Latin America
- CIA drug trafficking allegations
- Illegal drug trade in the Philippines
- Illegal drug trade in Bolivia
- Maritime drug trafficking in Latin America
- United Nations Office on Drugs and Crime
- United Nations Commission on Narcotic Drugs
- 2025 livestreamed murder in Argentina
