= Corsico =

Corsico Còrsich (Lombard)
- Comune
- Comune di Corsico
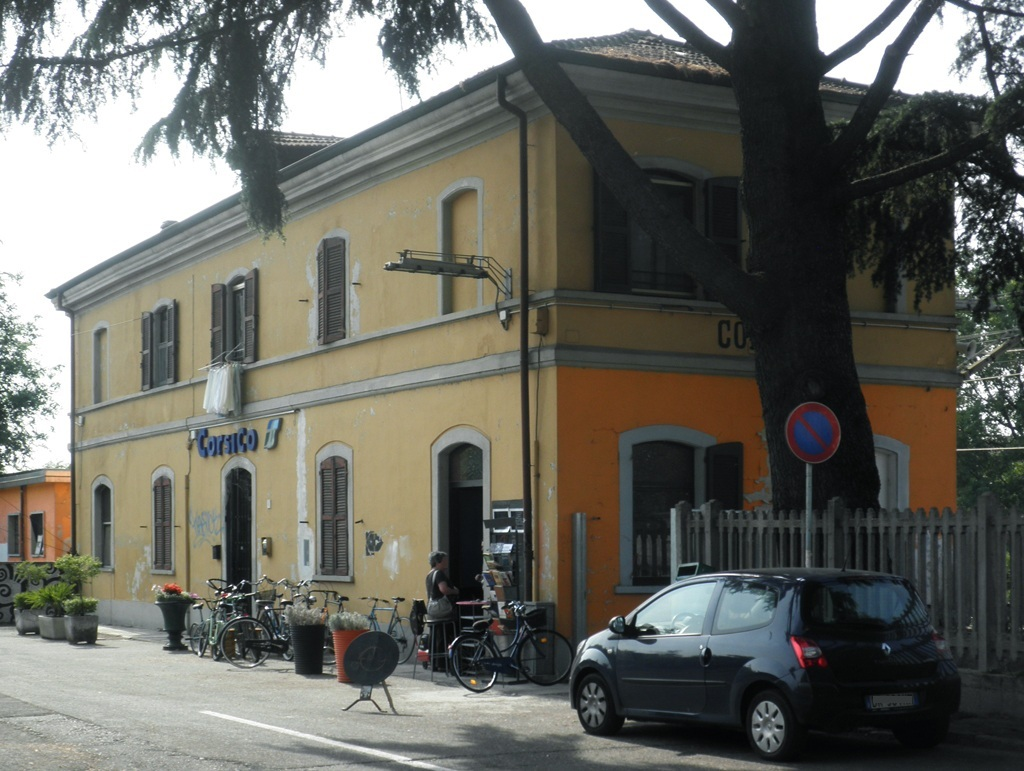
- Old railway station in Corsico

- Coat of arms

- Location within Italy Location within Lombardy
- Coordinates: 45°26′N 9°7′E
- Country: Italy
- Region: Lombardy
- Metropolitan city: Milan (MI)

Government
  - Mayor: Filippo Errante from 15-6-2015 (Lega Nord)

Area
  - Total: 5.4 km^{2} (2.1 sq mi)
- Elevation: 113 m (371 ft)

Population (Oct. 2010)
  - Total: 34,189
  - Density: 6,300/km^{2} (16,000/sq mi)
- Demonym: Corsichesi
- Time zone: UTC+1 (CET)
  - Summer (DST): UTC+2 (CEST)
- Postal code: 20094
- Dialing code: 02
- Website: Official website

Corsico (Milanese: Còrsich) is a comune (municipality) in the Province of Milan in the Italian region Lombardy, bordering Milan on the southwest.

Corsico received the honorary title of city with a presidential decree on 22 July 1987. Corsico is served by Corsico railway station.

== International relations ==
=== Twin towns – sister cities ===
Corsico is twinned with:

- Malakoff, France, since 1970
- Mataró, Spain, since 1993
- San Giovanni a Piro, Italy, since 2015
