= Platì =

Platì Pratì (Sicilian) Griko: Platý
- Comune
- Comune di Platì
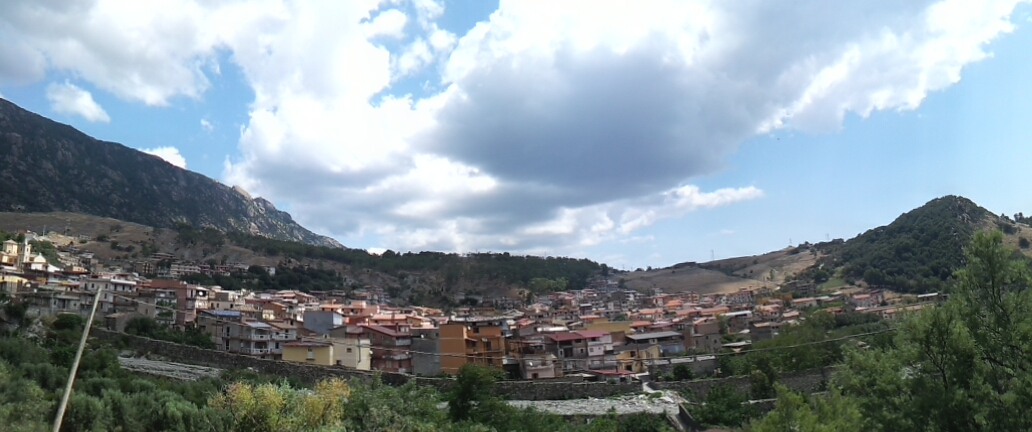
- View of Platì

- Coat of arms

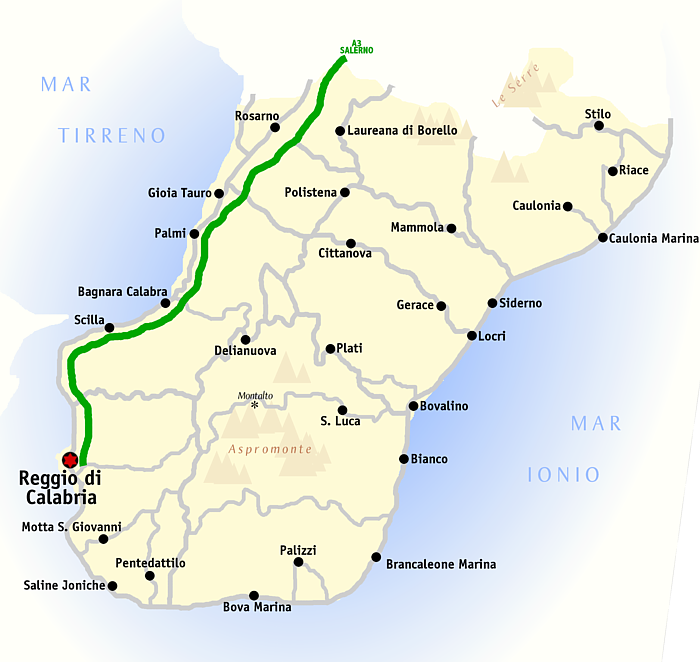
- Map of the province of Reggio Calabria

- Location within Italy Location within Calabria
- Coordinates: 38°13′N 16°03′E
- Country: Italy
- Region: Calabria
- Metropolitan city: Reggio Calabria (RC)

Area
  - Total: 50 km^{2} (19 sq mi)

Population (January 1, 2009)
  - Total: 3,762
  - Density: 75/km^{2} (190/sq mi)
- Demonym: 10,000
- Time zone: UTC+1 (CET)
  - Summer (DST): UTC+2 (CEST)
- Postal code: 89039
- Dialing code: 0964
- Patron saint: Mary Our Lady of Loreto
- Saint day: December 9
- Website: Official website

Platì (Greek: Πλατύ, romanized: Platý, lit. 'wide; the plain'; Calabrian: Pratì) is a town and comune (municipality) in the province of Reggio Calabria, in Calabria, southern Italy. It rises 300 metres (980 ft) above sea level on the slope of the Aspromonte mountains and is located next to the Aspromonte National Park.

== History ==
Platì was founded in 1505 when Ferdinand II of Aragon granted the fief Platì and Santa Barbara to Carlo Spinelli, member of the noble Neapolitan Spinelli family, princes of Cariati. The small hamlet that was set up was named Platì in 1704. The area was apparently populated by ex-convicts from the prison of Reggio Calabria as a kind of penal colony. The population was mainly employed in sheep husbandry.

An earthquake on February 5, 1783, partially destroyed the town, killing 25 people. The area is prone to floods and landslides and was hit in 1848, 1861, 1870, 1908, 1951, 1953, 1958, 1972 and 1973.

On October 16–18, 1951, the town was hit by a flood from the Careri river and landslides, partially destroying the town and leaving 18 people dead. Many people decided to leave and headed north to Turin and Milan or emigrated, in particular to Australia. In 1953 and 1958 the town was hit again by floods. Many of the migrants to Australia ended up in Griffith, New South Wales and made the area into an important wine-producing region.

== 'Ndrangheta stronghold ==
Platì is notorious for being a center of the powerful 'Ndrangheta, the Calabrian organized crime organization. The town has been called the "cradle of kidnapping" and it is suspected that kidnap victims were held within underground hide-outs. The wealth of the crime families is well hidden, and the municipality is officially the one with the lowest per capita income in Italy. In a large scale operation in the night of 13 November 2003, thousands of carabinieri stormed the town, discovering hidden underground rooms and hallways and arresting 131 people.

The tunnels are sophisticated and in some places large enough to drive a lorry through. Most of the passages run parallel to the town's sewer system. Remote-controlled trap doors lead into houses, some of them uninhabited, enabling the 'ndranghetisti to escape from the police at a moment's notice. Some of the tunnels emerge outside the town close to woodland, while others open into animal pens and barns on local farms.

Platì is home to the Barbaro, Molluso, Marando, Papalia and Sergi 'ndrine. Seven of Platì's mayors have failed to finish their terms: two were killed while still serving, while another five were removed from office on suspicion of corruption.

In July 2006, the town council was dissolved on orders from the central government and replaced by a prefectoral commissioner because it had been infiltrated by the 'Ndrangheta.

== Notable people ==
- Francesco Barbaro (1927–2018), notorious 'Ndrangheta boss known as the king of kidnapping
- Tony Catanzariti (born 1949), Australian politician representing the Australian Labor Party
- Rocco Perri (1887–unknown), an infamous bootlegger in Ontario, Canada
