= Buccinasco =

Buccinasco Buccinasch (Lombard)
- Comune
- Comune di Buccinasco
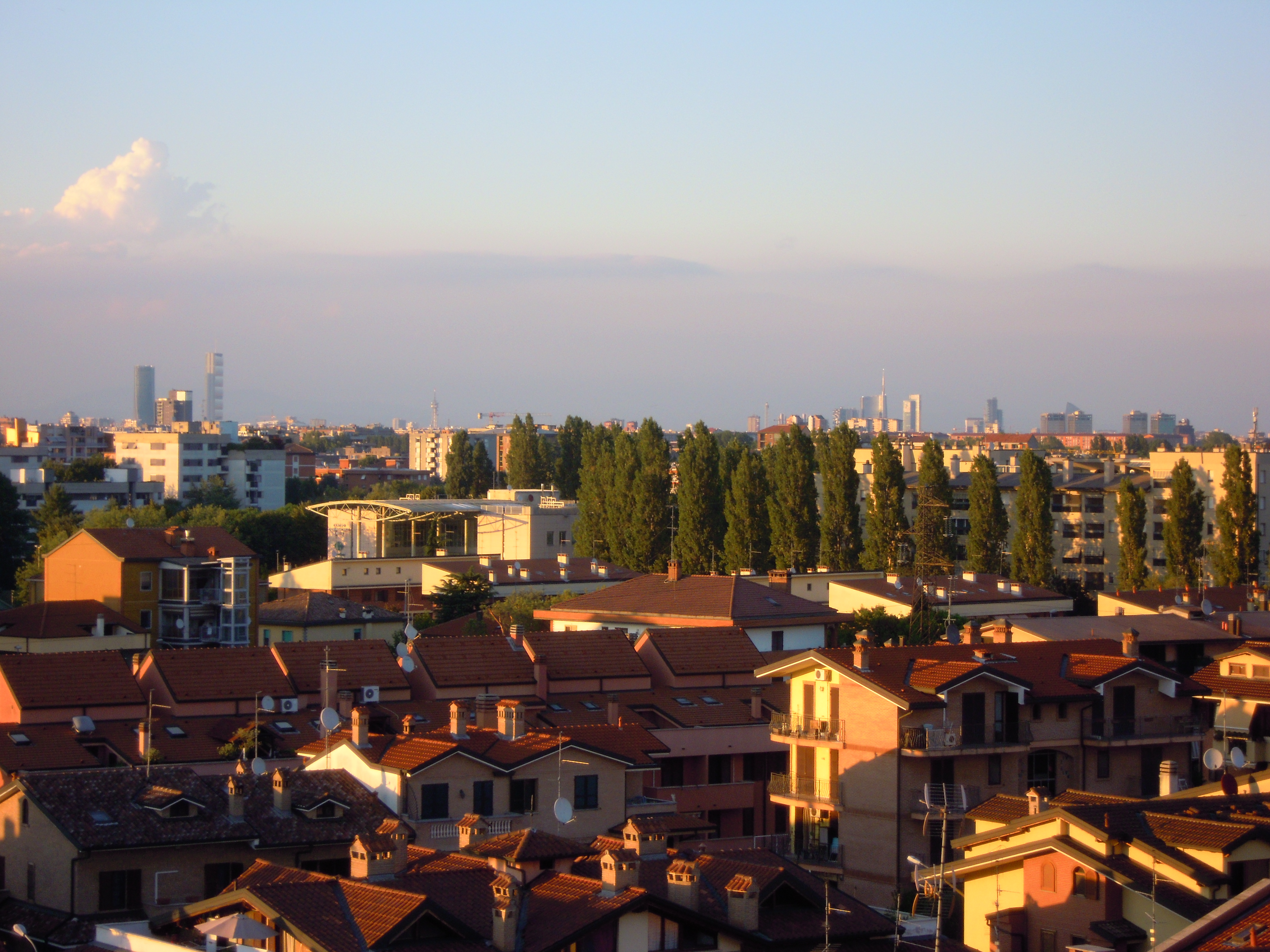
- View of Buccinasco

- Coat of arms

- Location within Italy Location within Lombardy
- Coordinates: 45°25′N 9°7′E
- Country: Italy
- Region: Lombardy
- Metropolitan city: Milan (MI)
- Frazioni: Buccinasco Castello, Gudo Gambaredo, Romano Banco, Rovido

Government
  - Mayor: Rino Carmelo Vincenzo Pruiti

Area
  - Total: 12.0 km^{2} (4.6 sq mi)
- Elevation: 113 m (371 ft)

Population (31 December 2017)
  - Total: 27,171
  - Density: 2,260/km^{2} (5,860/sq mi)
- Demonym: Buccinaschesi
- Time zone: UTC+1 (CET)
  - Summer (DST): UTC+2 (CEST)
- Postal code: 20090
- Dialing code: 02
- Website: Official website

Buccinasco (Milanese: Buccinasch [bytʃiˈnask]) is a comune (municipality) in the Metropolitan City of Milan in the Italian region Lombardy, located about 7 kilometres (4 mi) southwest of Milan.

== History ==
The comune was created in 1841 through the merger of Buccinasco Castello, Rovido, Romano Banco and Gudo Gambaredo and, in 1871, Grancino and Ronchetto sul Naviglio (the latter annexed to Milan in 1923). It remained an agricultural center until the 1950s. Later, consistent immigration from southern Italy led Romano Banco to overcome the other hamlets in population, and it is now the main industrial and administrative part of the comune.

== Main sights ==
- The Visconti Castle (it), built in the late 14th century, and renovated in the 15th and 16th centuries.
- Villa Durini-Borromeo (16th century)
