= List of 'ndrine =

The 'ndrina (plural: 'ndrine) is the basic unit in the 'Ndrangheta, a criminal organization from Calabria.

== Province of Catanzaro ==
=== Badolato ===
- Gallelli

=== Borgia ===
- Giacobbe

=== Curinga ===
- Fruci

=== Guardavalle ===
- Gallace
- Mandalari

=== Isola di Capo Rizzuto ===
- Costanzo
- Gaglianesi

=== Lamezia Terme ===
- Giampà
- Gualtieri
- Iannazzo
- Torcasio

=== Marcedusa ===
- Trovato

=== Soverato ===
- Sia

== Province of Cosenza ==
=== Amantea ===
- Gentile

=== Cariati ===
- Critelli

=== Cassano allo Ionio ===
- Faillace
- Forastefano

=== Castrovillari ===
- Abbruzzese

=== Cetraro ===
- Muto

=== Corigliano ===
- Carelli

=== Cosenza ===
- Bruni
- Cicero
- Lanzino
- Perna
- Pino

=== Rossano ===
- Acri

== Province of Crotone ==
=== Cirò ===
- Farao

=== Crotone ===
- Ciampa
- Vrenna

=== Cutro ===
- Dragone
- Grande Aracri

=== Isola di Capo Rizzuto ===
- Arena
- Nicoscia
- Paparo

=== Petilia Policastro ===
- Carvelli
- Ferrazzo

=== Rocca di Neto ===
- Iona

== Province of Reggio Calabria ==
=== Reggio Calabria ===
- Barreca
- Condello (also in Fiumara and Villa San Giovanni)
- De Stefano-Tegano
- Di Giovine
- Latella
- Labate
- Libri
- Lo Giudice
- Nasone
- Rosmini
- Serraino
- Zindato

=== Melito Porto Salvo ===
- Iamonte

=== Sant'Eufemia d'Aspromonte ===
- Araniti (also in Sanbatello)

=== Villa San Giovanni ===
- Imerti

== Gioia Tauro plain (Province of Reggio Calabria) ==
=== Castellace ===
- Mammoliti

=== Cinquefrondi ===
- Petullà

=== Cittanova ===
- Albanese (also Laureana di Borrello)
- Facchineri

=== Gioia Tauro ===
- Molè
- Piromalli

=== Melicucco ===
- Guerrisi Mercuri

=== Palmi ===
- Bruzzise
- Gallico
- Parrello

=== Polistena ===
- Longo Versace

=== Rizziconi ===
- Crea
- Franconieri

=== Rosarno ===
- Pesce
- Bellocco

=== Seminara ===
- Gioffrè
- Santaiti

=== Sinopoli ===
- Alvaro
- Violi

=== Taurianova ===
- Avignone
- Maio
- Zagari

== Locride (Province of Reggio Calabria) ==
=== Africo ===
- Bruzzaniti
- Morabito
- Palamara

=== Careri ===
- Cua

=== Ciminà ===
- Varacalli

=== Condofuri ===
- Rodà

=== Gioiosa Ionica ===
- Belfiore
- Ierinò
- Ursino

=== Laureana di Borrello ===
- D'Agostino
- Ferrentino-Chindamo-Lamari

=== Locri ===
- Cataldo
- Cordì

=== Marina di Gioiosa Ionica ===
- Aquino
- Mazzaferro

=== Monasterace ===
- Ruga

=== Platì ===
- Agresta
- Barbaro
- Ciampa
- Marando
- Molluso
- Papalia
- Sergi
- Trimboli

=== San Lorenzo ===
- Paviglianiti

=== San Luca ===
- Nirta-Strangio
- Pelle
- Giorgi
- La Maggiore
- Romeo

=== Siderno ===
- Gallace-Novella
- Commisso
- Costa

== Province of Vibo Valentia ==
=== Briatico ===
- Accorinti

=== Filadelfia ===
- Anello

=== Filandari ===
- Soriano

=== Gerocarne ===
- Loielo

=== Limbadi ===
- Mancuso

=== San Gregorio d'Ippona ===
- Fiarè

=== Sant'Onofrio ===
- Bonavota

=== Serra San Bruno ===
- Vallelunga

=== Tropea ===
- La Rosa
- Piserà

=== Vibo Valentia ===
- Cracolici
- Lo Bianco
- Tripodi

== See also ==
- Honoured Society
- List of criminal organizations
- Organized crime in Italy
- Siderno Group
