= Barreca 'ndrina =

- Founded: 1980s
- Founder: Filippo Barreca ('u ragiuneri)
- Founding location: Reggio Calabria, Calabria, Italy
- Years active: 1980s-present
- Territory: Pellaro and the surrounding neighborhoods in Reggio Calabria.
- Ethnicity: Calabrians
- Criminal activities: Drug trafficking, money laundering, arms trafficking, extortion, corruption, murder

The Barreca 'ndrina is a clan of the 'Ndrangheta, a criminal and mafia-type organisation in Calabria, Italy. The 'ndrina is based in the city of Reggio Calabria, having its base in the Pellaro neighborhood.

== History ==
The Barreca 'ndrina emerged as an offshoot of the now-defunct Ambrogio 'ndrina and rose to prominence following the death of the historical capobastone of the Ambrogio, Carmelo Ambrogio, who was killed during the "Faida di Pellaro" (Pellaro feud), which took place in the 1980s. As a result, the Barreca became the dominant 'ndrina in the Pellaro area.

The historic capobastone of the Barreca 'ndrina was Filippo Barreca, born in 1947, and known by the nickname 'u ragiuneri. During that period, the 'ndrina’s main criminal activities included cigarette and precious goods smuggling, drug and arms trafficking, and money laundering. Barreca had his son baptized by the capobastone of the Araniti 'ndrina, Santo Araniti. In 1979, Barreca received the “santista” rank from Araniti himself.

During the Second 'Ndrangheta war, the Barreca 'ndrina sided with the De Stefano-Tegano, Libri and Latella 'ndrine against Pasquale Condello, Diego Rosmini and Antonio Imerti. According to investigations, the Barreca 'ndrina provided logistical support for the murder of politician Lodovico Ligato (former MP and president of the Italian State Railways), which took place between the night of August 27 and 28, 1989, in Bocale di Pellaro. Investigators believe Filippo Barreca himself ensured that a motocross event originally planned near Ligato’s villa was relocated to another area, facilitating the assassination.

On 8 October 1992, while imprisoned in Cuneo for a definitive nine-year sentence related to drug trafficking, the capobastone Filippo Barreca formally became a collaborator with justice. On 8 November 1994, he testified that his status as a “santista” granted him access to a secretive elite within the 'Ndrangheta, enabling direct relationships with Masonic circles. Barreca also offered particularly detailed insight into the 'Ndrangheta’s ties to Freemasonry, Right-wing subversive movements, and the Cosa Nostra.

In 2013, Giovanni Franco, a high-ranking member of the Barreca 'ndrina, was arrested in Antibes, France. He was located in a residential neighborhood at the outskirts of Antibes, where he was found in the garden of a villa that served as his refuge. Franco was subject to an arrest warrant issued in February 2012 for association with the intent to traffic narcotics. Upon extradition to Italy, he would serve a definitive sentence of eleven years and four months. His criminal record dates back to the late 1970s and includes convictions for issuing bad checks, receiving stolen goods, escape, forgery, illegal possession of weapons, aiding and abetting, and extortion.

Following Filippo Barreca’s arrest and subsequent cooperation with authorities, the 'ndrina experienced a period of severe decline, nearly disappearing between the 1990s and the early 2000s. Barreca's cousin, also named Filippo Barreca, born in 1956, known as Peppì, after serving years in prison, was placed under house arrest in 2015, which allowed him the opportunity to restore the Barreca’s position as one of the most important 'ndrine of Reggio Calabria.

Peppì Barreca's strategic objective included reestablishing alliances with the influential 'ndrine from Reggio Calabria, such as the De Stefano-Tegano, Condello, and Libri families. Investigative operations, revealed multiple secret meetings, including one held on 26 May 2018 in a reserved hospital room, involving Barreca, Carmine De Stefano, and other prominent criminal figures. Additional encounters involved Antonio “Totò” Libri, during which topics ranged from extortion schemes and territorial control to coordination over public works contracts and drug trafficking. These discussions highlighted shared criminal interests, such as the imposition of "pizzo", managing construction projects like those at the former SoCIB-Coca Cola site and EuroSpin supermarket, and ambitions to control fiber optic infrastructure contracts. Throughout these interactions, a reciprocal commitment and long-standing alliance among the 'ndrine were reaffirmed.

The 'ndrina suffered a severe blow on 16 February 2021, following the arrest of 28 affiliates, including the capobastone Peppì Barreca. On 30 May 2021, the maxi-trial called Epicentro began, involving 75 defendants charged with extortion and mafia association. One of Barreca’s intercepted phrases presented during the trial was: "I have to do it, otherwise there will be nothing, not even for God!" The first instance of the Epicentro abbreviated trial concluded with fifty-three convictions and five acquittals, with the verdict issued after four days of deliberation by the Judge for Preliminary Investigations (GUP) of Reggio Calabria.
