= Paolo Serraino =

Paolo Serraino (born March 21, 1942), is an Italian criminal and a member of the 'Ndrangheta mafia-like organization in Calabria. He was born in Cardeto, about 10 km southeast of the city of Reggio Calabria.

== Personal ==
He is the younger brother of the boss of the Serraino 'ndrina, Francesco Serraino (born in 1929), known as the “king of the mountains” for his control over the wood industry in the Aspromonte mountains. At the age of 17, he was already implicated in illegal possession of firearms.

The Serraino clan is related to the Di Giovine clan. The Di Giovine clan, headed by Maria Serraino, a cousin of Paolo Serraino, and her son Emilio Di Giovine was active in arms and drug trafficking in Milan, in northern Italy. The organisation was dismantled in 1993-1995.

== Second 'Ndrangheta war ==
The Serraino clan was a protagonist in the Second 'Ndrangheta war (1985–1991), which grouped all the 'ndrine in the city of Reggio Calabria into either one of two opposing factions: the Condello, Imerti, Serraino and Rosmini clans on one side, and the De Stefano 'ndrina, Tegano, Libri and Latella clans on the other.

Francesco Serraino was killed on April 23, 1986, in a hospital in the city of Reggio Calabria, with his son Alessandro (born in 1959). He was held responsible for killing Giorgio De Stefano, at the time the boss of the De Stefano 'ndrina, in 1977, at the end of the First 'Ndrangheta war. Paolo and his brother Domenico Serraino (born in 1945) took over the reins of the clan.

Paolo Serraino became one of the leaders in the war. He financed the purchase of several bazookas. The arms were delivered by their relatives of the Serraino-Di Giovine clan in Milan. Both he and his brother Domenico became members of Camera di Controllo, a provincial commission of the 'Ndrangheta, formed at the end of the war in September 1991 to avoid further internal conflicts.

== Arrest and convictions ==
After nine years on the run, Paolo Serraino and his brother Domenico were arrested in Cardeto in July 1995. He had already been convicted to life in November 1992 for murder and Mafia association.

In 1998, he received a life sentence for ordering the killing in 1989 of the Christian Democrat politician Lodovico Ligato, former head of the Italian State Railways. Ligato demanded a 10 percent bribe on public work contracts, jeopardizing agreements already reached among a so-called "business committee" of local politicians and 'Ndrangheta groups.

In January 1999 he received a life sentence for murder and Mafia association in the Olimpia Trial.

== Sources ==
- Fiandaca, Giovanni (ed.) (2007), Women and the Mafia: Female Roles in Organized Crime Structures, New York: Springer ISBN 0-387-36537-0
- (in Italian) Gratteri, Nicola & Antonio Nicaso (2006). Fratelli di Sangue, Cosenza: Luigi Pellegrini Editore ISBN 88-8101-373-8
- Paoli, Letizia (2003). Mafia Brotherhoods: Organized Crime, Italian Style, New York: Oxford University Press ISBN 0-19-515724-9 (Review by Klaus Von Lampe) (Review by Alexandra V. Orlova)
