= Gallicianò =

Village in Reggio Calabria, Italy

Coordinates: 38°01′00″N 15°53′11″E

Gallicianò (Γκαλιτσιανό, transliterated Gaḍḍicianò in Greek of Calabria) is a village of about 60 inhabitants, frazione of the comune of Condofuri, of the Città Metropolitana di Reggio Calabria, Calabria, Italy.

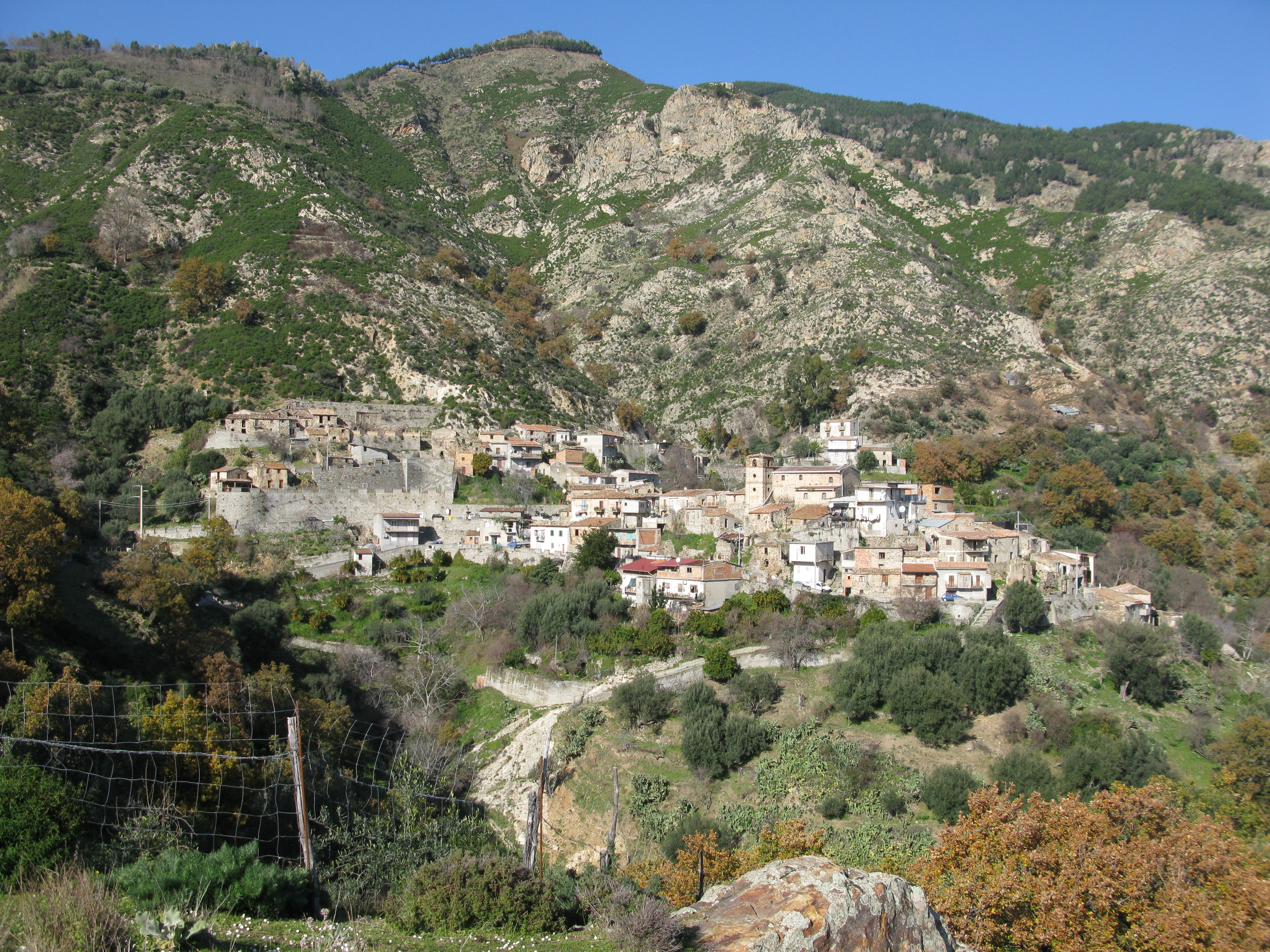
Gallicianò

== Territory ==
The center is at 621 m above sea level, on the right bank of the river Amendolea. It falls into the Aspromonte National Park, lying itself on the southern slope of the Aspromonte.

== History ==
The presence of man is attested in the valley of Amendolea since the Neolithic age. The first inhabited village of the area was Peripoli, a fortified city of Magna Graecia.

The earliest documentary evidence of Gallicianò, dating back to 1060, is found in the "Brebion of the Byzantine metropolitan church of Reggio Calabria", edited by Byzantinist André Guillou. In this document the center is referred to as "to galikianòn".

Τhe name derives from Gallicum, the medieval name of the modern city of Kilkis, from where the inhabitants came to recover in southern Italy after the disasters caused by Bulgarian raids. Another assumption is that it could derive from the Roman family Gallicius, which had land possessions (Gallicianum) in the area.

Until the modern age, it was a possession of the fief of Amendolea, and followed the affairs of that village. It was a comune at the end of the '700-early' 800, later becoming a frazione of Condofuri.

Severely damaged by the earthquake of 1783, it has maintained its primitive structure. The floods of 1951 and 1971 forced many people to leave the village.

== Language ==
As with the other (now very few) villages of Calabria and Puglia that are part of the Greek linguistic minority in Italy, (which once covered large areas of southern Italy and Sicily), the question of the origin of the dialect has been debated among linguists. While it is certain that Greek was widely spoken in the times of the Greek colonies (at least along the coastal zones), it remains to be determined whether this form of the language has survived to modern day, which some clues point to, and as Gerhard Rohlfs argued or whether the dialect is a remnant of a re-introduction of Greek during the Byzantine Empire. Another theory is that the language survived in its ancient form but was greatly influenced by Byzantine medieval Greek. However, the language is in serious danger of extinction with few natural speakers left.

Gallicianò is called "Acropoli della Magna Grecia", since it is the only village in which the Greek language is spoken, although the Greek of Calabria is still used here in an increasingly domestic environment. Linguistics provides elements for a very ancient chronological dating, the presence of vocabulary, syntactic forms and particular verbs, in fact, reports the origin of the center in the 7th century BC.

Gallicianò is known throughout the area for the high conservatism of Greek traditions, not only in the linguistic but also musical, gastronomic and ritual contexts.

== Religious architecture ==
- In the year 1999 the construction of the small Orthodox church of Panaghìa tis Elladas (Madonna di Grecia) was completed. The Byzantine church, built by renovating a stone house in the upper part of the town, is open to worship and represents the testimony, in a renewed ecumenical climate, of a return from Orthodox pilgrims to Greek worship sites. The renovation is due to the figure of architect Domenico Nucera of Gallicianò. A few years ago, a small community of Greek Orthodox monks was re-established for centuries.

The name comes from the Byzantine church of the same name with its annexed monastery, whose ruins are located in a locality near Gallicianò, which is called "Grecia".

- The Church of San Giovanni Battista, located in the main square of the center (Alimos Square), is the Catholic Church of the village. Ancient building, already an arcipretale church, has a marble statue of S. Giovanni, a work of the eighteenth century of Gagini's school, two ancient sailors, and two bells dating back to 1508 and 1683.

- The tourist who visits Gallicianò along the main road encounters as the first monument, located just outside the town, the calvary. The structure has two distinct elements: an octagonal fence with a fountain in a newsstand; The second element is an arched newsstand, featuring a mosaic and a Greek cross. The whole structure is built in local stone.

== Civil architecture ==
- The former municipal building, located in Alimos Square. This is the largest building in the city center, with attractive front decorations.

- The small ethnographic museum was created by collecting tools used in everyday life by the ancestors of the villagers. There are broom covers, musulupare (traditional cheese molds), zampogne, lire and other rare objects that affect lovers of cultural anthropology. A room faithfully reproduces the life of the ancient inhabitants of Gallicianò.

- The House of Music preserves typical instruments (zampogne, lire, tamburelli, organetti).

- The greekphone library is a reality that dates back to the '90s. It has a reading room, it has antique books and texts made in recent years by representatives of local culture and language as well as numerous modern Greek texts.

- Next to the Panaghìa tis Elladas church, a small theater was built that overlooks the valley of Amendolea. It was entitled to the patriarch of Constantinople Bartholomew I during his visit to the country in 2001. The cavea are semi-circular. The scene is missing, as the designer believed that the mountains in front and the small village were a more than enough scenario for any representation.

- The fountain of love (cànnalo tis agapi) is the very ancient source of the village, where the women of the village came to draw water with traditional jugs. For young people in the country, it was a place to meet more easily than elsewhere women, with the excuse to drink from the source. It is a tradition that the bride and groom at the end of the marriage ceremony go out of the church to come to the source for a new promise of fidelity.

== Economy ==
At one time the breeding of silkworm was thriving, and cereal cultivation was widespread. There was the presence in the village of old oil mills, nowadays reduced to the state of ruins, and old water mills along the Amendolea.

Today there are small animal farms, small crops farms and, near the center, olive groves and vineyards.

As far as handicraft is concerned, they are still present in the center of wood carvers, and an art shop.
