= Serraino 'ndrina =

- Founded: 1950s
- Founding location: Cardeto, Calabria, Italy
- Years active: 1950s-unknown (semi-defunct in 1995)
- Territory: Cardeto and around Piazza Prealpi in northern Milan in Italy
- Ethnicity: Calabrians
- Criminal activities: Racketeering, cigarette smuggling, drug trafficking and weapons trafficking
- Allies: Various 'ndrine
- Rivals: De Stefano 'ndrina Libri 'ndrina Latella 'ndrina

The Serraino 'ndrina (also known as Serraino-Di Giovine 'ndrina) is a clan of the 'Ndrangheta, a criminal and mafia-type organisation in Calabria, Italy. The 'ndrina is based in Cardeto, about 10 km southeast of the city of Reggio Calabria. The Serraino clan is made up of two groups of brothers, first cousins.

== First group ==
The first group was led by Franceso Serraino (born in 1929), known as the “king of the mountains” for his control over the wood industry in the Aspromonte mountains.

Francesco Serraino was killed on April 23, 1986, during the Second 'Ndrangheta war (1985–1991), in a hospital in the city of Reggio Calabria, with his son Alessandro (born in 1959). He was held responsible for killing Giorgio De Stefano, at the time the boss of the De Stefano 'ndrina, in 1977, at the end of the First 'Ndrangheta war. His brothers Paolo Serraino and Domenico Serraino (born in 1945) took over the reins of the clan.

The Serraino clan was a protagonist in the Second 'Ndrangheta war, which grouped all the 'ndrine in the city of Reggio Calabria into either one of two opposing factions: the Condello, Imerti, Serraino and Rosmini clans on one side, and the De Stefano 'ndrina, Tegano, Libri and Latella clans on the other. Paolo and Domenico Serraino were arrested in Cardeto in July 1995.

== Second group ==
The second group was composed of Francesco Serraino, Alessandro Serraino, Domenico Serraino, Filippo Serraino, and Demetrio Serraino. Their sister Maria Serraino married Rosario Di Giovine, and moved to Milan in 1963.

The Serraino-Di Giovine clan controlled the territory around Piazza Prealpi, a square located in the north of Milan, and via Belgioioso. Under the leadership of Maria Serraino the family began their illegal career with smuggling cigarettes and receiving stolen goods. During the 1970s, the trade shifted from cigarettes to drugs (including hashish, cocaine, heroin, and ecstasy) and weapons, and involved the whole family. The weapons were sent to Calabria, where their relatives were involved in the Second 'Ndrangheta war.

The organisation was dismantled in 1993-1995 by three police operations, called Belgio from the name of the street where the clan resided.
