= Serraino =

Serraino is an Italian surname. Notable people with the surname include:

- Paolo Serraino (born 1942), Italian gangster of the Serraino 'ndrina
- Maria Serraino (1931–2017), Italian gangster of the Serraino 'ndrina

== See also ==
- Serrano (surname)
