= Santo Araniti =

Member of the 'Ndrangheta

- Born: 25 April 1947 (age 79); Reggio Calabria, Italy
- Occupation: Capobastone of the Araniti 'ndrina
- Allegiance: 'Ndrangheta

Santo Araniti (Italian pronunciation: [ˈsanto araˈniːti]; born 25 April 1947, in Reggio Calabria) is an Italian criminal and a member of the 'Ndrangheta, a Mafia-type criminal organisation in Calabria. He was a fugitive and included in the list of most wanted fugitives in Italy from 1983 until his capture in May 1994.

== Criminal career ==
He started his criminal career as an associate of Domenico Tripodo – the boss of the city of Reggio Calabria and the surrounding areas. He became a member of La Santa in the 1970s. He was a key ally of the De Stefano brothers, in the war against their former boss Tripodo in the mid 1970s. In 1985, at the start of the Second 'Ndrangheta war between the De Stefano and the Serraino, Condello and Imerti clans, he chose the side of the Condello-Imerti alliance. The bloody six-year war clan left 621 deaths.

In 1990, he was sentenced to nine years for international drug trafficking. Later he received a life sentence for ordering the killing in 1989 of Lodovico Ligato, a former head of the Italian state railways.

== Number one ==
For a while, he was considered to be the "number one" of the 'Ndrangheta and the head of Camera di Controllo, a provincial commission of the 'Ndrangheta, that had been created as the result of negotiations to end years of inter family violence.

On 24 May 1994, police arrested him in Rome. He was incarcerated under the harsh article 41-bis prison regime. In November 2008 he was released from the harsh regime but remained in prison.
