= Valtos Beach =

Beach of Greece

Coordinates: 39.2849°N 20.3906°E

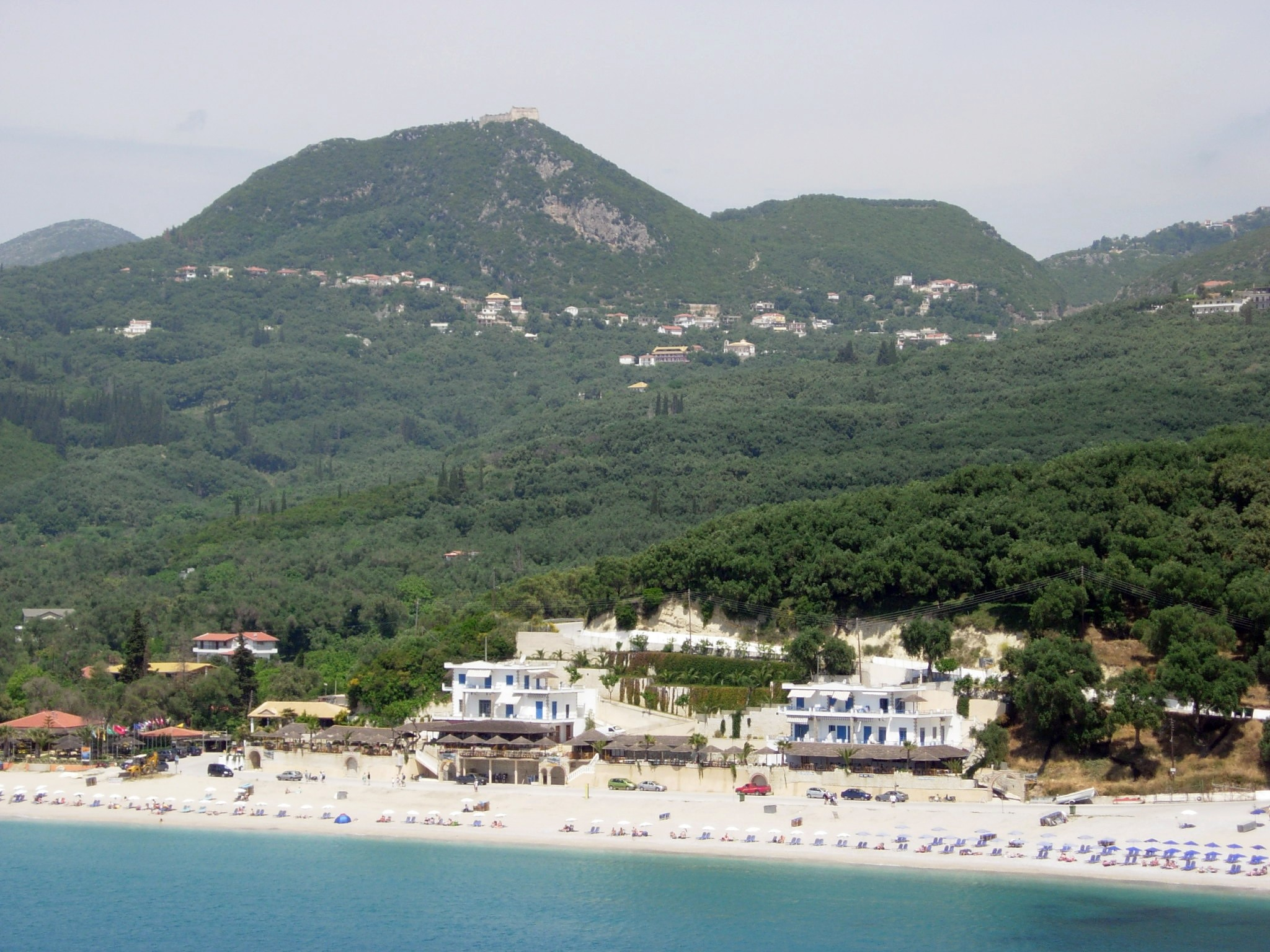
Valtos Beach

Valtos Beach is a large crescent-shaped beach that is a 20-minute walk northwest of Parga, Greece. The beach has a 3 km (1.9 mi) coastline that includes white sand with soft pebbles, areas of greenery, and deep, blue waters.

The area has been developed for tourism, with activities such as jet skiing, banana boat rides, pedalo boat rides, and places to rent canoes to explore the Ionian Sea. There are also multiple cafes and taverns scattered around the beach that are open all day, as well as small hotels and rooms along the coast that people can rent.

It can be seen from the peak of a castle hill.

== Events ==
The 'Panagina', a festival held on Panagla Island (about a 2-hour boat ride from the beach), has folk music performances, boat shows, and fireworks. This festival is held on August 14 every year and it lasts till the 15.
