= Maria Serraino =

Italian criminal

- Born: 1931; Reggio Calabria, Italy
- Died: December 7, 2017 (aged 85–86)
- Occupation: Criminal
- Known for: One of the rare examples of a woman leading a 'Ndrangheta clan
- Spouse: Rosario Di Giovine
- Children: 12
- Relatives: Paolo Serraino
- Allegiance: 'Ndrangheta
- Criminal charges: Mafia association and murder
- Penalty: Life imprisonment

Maria Serraino (1931 – 7 December 2017) was an Italian criminal and a member of the 'Ndrangheta mafia-style organization in Calabria. She is one of the rare examples of a woman leading a 'Ndrangheta clan.

She belonged to a longstanding 'Ndrangheta family from the Reggio Calabria area, the Serraino 'ndrina, from Cardeto, about 10 km southeast of the city of Reggio Calabria. She was a cousin of Paolo Serraino, the boss of the Calabrian branch of the clan.

== Moving north ==
She married Rosario Di Giovine, a prolific tobacco smuggler. Between 1949 and 1985, he was sentenced 65 times for tobacco smuggling and 23 other violations of the tobacco monopoly rules. In 1963 the family moved to Milan. The Serraino-Di Giovine clan ultimately controlled the territory around Piazza Prealpi, a square located in the north of Milan, and via Belgioioso. The family began their illegal career with smuggling cigarettes and receiving stolen goods. Maria Serraino stood trial seven times for tobacco smuggling and six times for receiving stolen goods in the 1970s.

During the 1970s, the trade shifted from cigarettes to narcotics (including hashish, cocaine, heroin, and ecstasy) and weapons, and involved the whole family of twelve children. The weapons were sent to Calabria, where their relatives were involved in the Second 'Ndrangheta war (1985–1991). Her older sons, Antonio and Emilio Di Giovine, who dealt in stolen cars, helped to develop the drug trade from their contacts with foreign criminals. Within a few years, the family's activities concentrated on the drug business, and by the late 1980s the Serraino-Di Giovine clan ran one of the largest and most successful drug dealing enterprises in Milan. Their small local business transformed into a significant international trade.

== Running the clan ==
While the mother ruled the actual fiefdom in Milan, another central operation was located in Spain and managed by Emilio Di Giovine, trafficking hashish from Morocco to England and cocaine from Colombia to Milan. The operation in Milan was fully recognized by other criminal organizations that ran drug trafficking in neighbouring areas. Drug suppliers dealt only and exclusively with her, unwilling to risk taking other customers out of fear of reprisals. She ensured the overall operation of the association by distributing merchandise to her other sons and other partners, as well as collecting the money from middlemen. She also handled contacts with corrupt law enforcement officers.

She had various nicknames, such as Nonna eroina ("Grandma heroin"), Mamma eroina ("Mummy Heroin"), or simply La Signora ("The Lady"). According to Maria's daughter Rita Di Giovine, who became a state witness (pentito) in 1993: "My mother was the boss of the family. She was the one who gave the orders, even if my brother [Emilio] was the boss in name. She decided who was to do what, but she did it all in a way that my brother wouldn't notice she was running the family, not him."

== Downfall ==
The organisation was dismantled in 1993-1995 by three police operations, called Belgio from the name of the street where the clan resided. Some 180 members of the organisation were arrested. An important factor in the downfall of the clan was the arrest of Maria's oldest daughter Rita Di Giovine in March 1993 in Verona, in possession of 1,000 tablets of ecstasy.

At the age of 12, Rita had been taken out of school to help to unpack cocaine hidden in the panels of imported cars, and to stuff heroin into bottles of shampoo. She later transported large sums of cash and quantities of drugs. Part of her job was to bribe local police to overlook the family's activities, and in some cases to recruit them in order to give the family information on investigations or imminent arrests. A mother of three children by different fathers, she had been in jail several times herself. Rita's son became a heroin addict; he had been dealing heroin for the family when he was 15. By the time she was arrested, Rita was exhausted and angry with her brothers, mired in debt and addicted to amphetamines. She decided to give evidence against her family in return for state protection. Police picked up her brothers, her mother and stepfather, her son, and her ex-husband.

Maria Serraino was sentenced to life imprisonment for Mafia association and murder in September 1997. She had ordered the murder of a drug dealer who worked for the family but was attempting to go into business on his own. She was released to house arrest after twenty years due to severe ill-health, cancer; she died in Milan in 2017.

== Female boss ==
Maria Serraino embodies the main characteristic of female power in the 'Ndrangheta: power not in appearance but in substance. Unlike men, women are less interested in external recognition of their power and more interested in exercising it. Her daughter Rita Di Giovine attributed her mother with the qualities of a boss and made her charismatic leadership abilities a question of blood lines, of belonging to a traditional 'Ndrangheta family. "She’s got it right there in her blood, in her veins," Rita said about her mother. "My mother had all the power, because if she decided some job shouldn’t be done, then the job wasn’t done."

The rules of the 'Ndrangheta do not consider the possibility of female elements becoming members. Nevertheless, if a woman demonstrates certain abilities she can become associated with the title of sorella d'omertà, ("sister of omertà," the code of silence). However, swearing loyalty to the organization as is required for men, is not mandatory. This honour is limited to wives, daughters, sisters, girlfriends or someone related to male 'Ndrangheta members.

Despite Maria's prominent position she suffered violence from her husband, which was considered unimportant within this milieu: "I saw my father beat my mother," her daughter testified. "Even when she was nine months pregnant, he hit her with a broom and broke two ribs." The 'Ndrangheta is ruled by male prejudice, and women are considered the property of the men. Maria also could not prevent her daughter Rita from being sexually harassed by her brothers and raped by her father from the ages of nine to nineteen, when she became pregnant. Despite the hardships and her ruthless rule over the clan, she remained a mother in her own way. When she learned that one daughter became addicted to heroin, she undertook a pilgrimage to the Sanctuary of Our Lady of Polsi in Calabria, where she pledged to stop dealing heroin and only sell hashish, in the hope that her daughter would overcome her addiction.
