= Castle of Sant'Aniceto =

11th-century castle in Italy

- Castello di Sant'Aniceto (Italian); Κάστρο Αγίου Νικήτα (Greek)
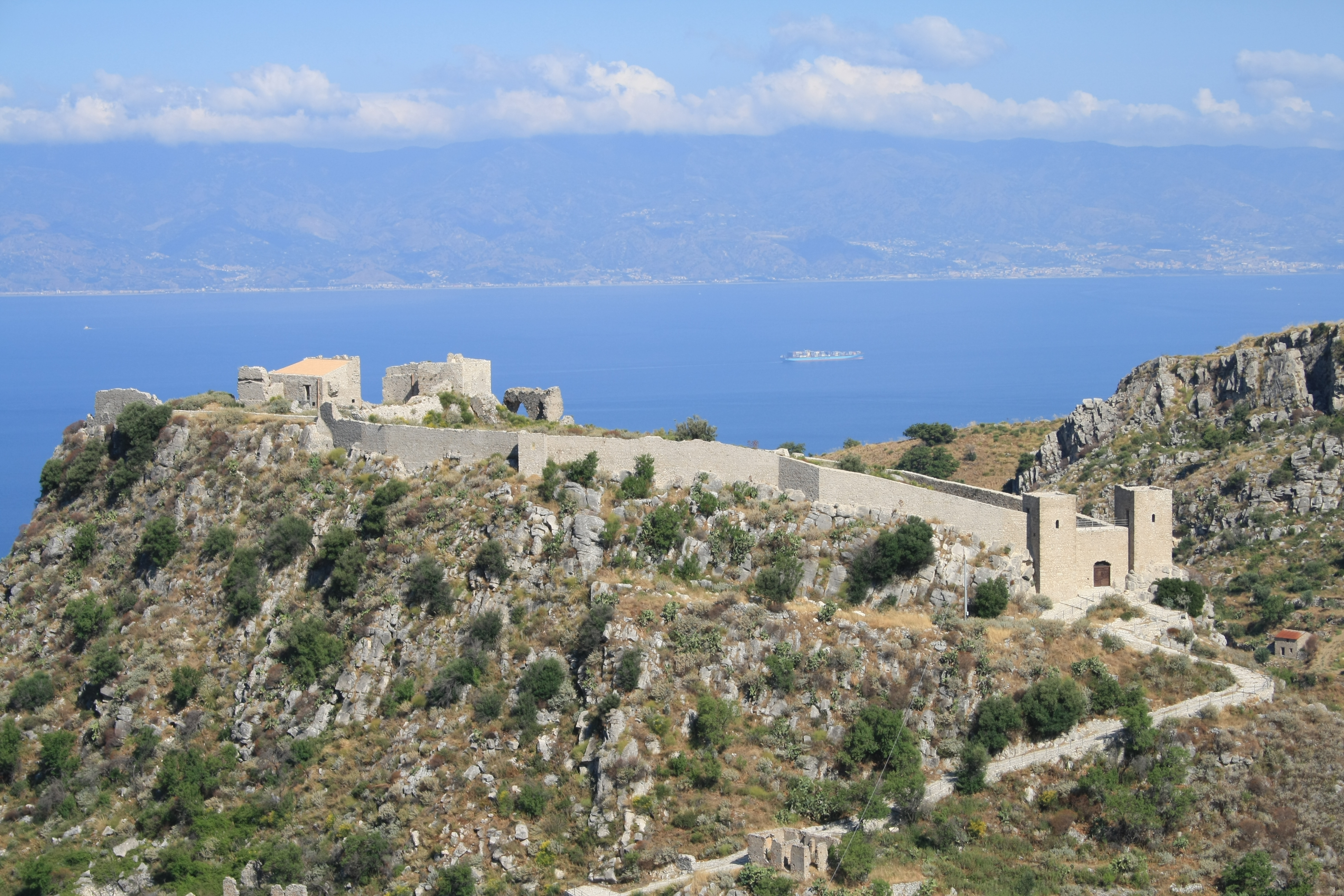
- Interactive map of Castle of Sant'Aniceto
- 38°01′37″N 15°42′27″E
- Location: Metropolitan City of Reggio Calabria, Italy

History
- Built: c. 11th century

The Castle of Sant'Aniceto (also San Niceto) is a Byzantine castle built in the early 11th century on a hill in Motta San Giovanni, now in the province of Reggio Calabria, southern Italy.

It is one of the few examples of High Middle Ages architecture in Calabria, as well as one of the few well-preserved Byzantine fortifications in the world. The name derives from that of Saint Nikitas, a Byzantine admiral who lived in the 7th-8th centuries.

== History ==
The castle is a Byzantine building built in the early 11th century on a hill in Motta San Giovanni.

In the 13th century the castle became the command center of the flourishing fief of Sant'Aniceto (which included Motta San Giovanni and Montebello). Two centuries later, it was caught in conflict with Reggio Calabria, and in 1459 it was destroyed by Alfonso of Calabria.

== Architecture ==
The castle has an irregular plan, which reminds that of a ship with the bow directed towards the mountains and the aft to the sea.

Nest to the entrance are two square towers. At the feet of the short steep path leading to the plain below is a small church, which has a frescoed dome portraying the Christ Pantokrator, a typical subject of Byzantine Art.

The height of the well-preserved walls varies from 3 to 3.5 meters, and they are some one meters thick.
