= Rosmini =

Rosmini may refer to:

- Antonio Rosmini-Serbati (1797–1855), Italian Roman Catholic priest and philosopher
- Dick Rosmini (1936–1995), American guitarist
- Diego Rosmini (born 1927), Italian Mafia boss
- Rosmini College, New Zealand Integrated single-sex boys secondary school
