= Panagia (disambiguation) =

Panagia is one of the titles of Mary, the mother of Jesus, in Eastern Orthodox Christianity.

Panagia (Greek: Παναγία) or Panaghia may also refer to:

Panagia

- places in Greece and Cyprus:
  - Panagia, Chalkidiki, a village in Chalkidiki, Greece
  - Panagia, Grevena, a village in Grevena, Greece
  - Panagia, Lemnos, a village on the island of Lemnos, Greece
  - Panagia, Oinousses, also known as Pasas, an island in Oinousses, Aegean Sea, Greece
  - Panagia, Paphos, a village in Cyprus
  - Panagia, Thasos, a village on the island of Thasos in northern Greece
  - Panagia island, an island in the Ionian Sea, Greece
  - Kyra Panagia, an island in the Sporades, Aegean Sea, Greece
- places in Turkey:
  - Panagia, officially recognized as Gökçeada, a town on the island of Imbros, Turkey

Panaghia

- Panaghia, a village in Calopăr Commune, Dolj County, Romania
- MV Panaghia (1935), a Greek cargo ship in service 1970-75
