= Lodovico Ligato =

Italian Christian Democrat politician (1939–1989)

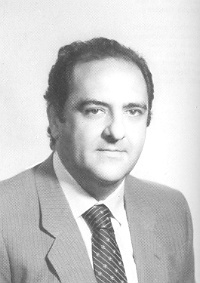
Lodovico Ligato in 1979.

Lodovico Ligato (Italian pronunciation: [lodoˈviːko liˈɡaːto]; 15 August 1939 – 27 August 1989) was an Italian Christian Democrat politician from Reggio Calabria and the former head of the Italian State Railways. He was killed by the 'Ndrangheta – the Calabrian equivalent of the Mafia.

== Political career ==
Born in Reggio Calabria as the son of a poor railwayman, he began in journalism, joined the Christian Democrat Party and in 1979 was elected to parliament with a large majority. He won with 80,000 votes thanks to the support of the De Stefano 'ndrina. Intelligent, pushy, self-assured and charming, he rose quickly in the ranks of the party. He was re-elected in 1983.

In 1985, thanks to his political connections, he was made head of the state railways. Three years later he was forced by his own party to resign, charged with fraud for vast sums of money spent on throwaway sheets for couchettes, bought by the railways in a crooked contract for 10 times their real value (known as the "lenzuola d'oro" or "golden sheets" scandal). Subsequently, there were other charges of bribery, corruption and embezzlement.

== Killed by the 'Ndrangheta ==
Back in Calabria he claimed a large share of the rake-offs from huge and lucrative public works contracts. At the end of the 1980s, 600 billion lire (US$444 million) were allocated for the modernization of the city of Reggio Calabria. Ligato demanded a 10 percent bribe on the whole project, jeopardizing agreements already reached among a so-called "business committee" of local politicians and 'Ndrangheta groups.

On 27 August 1989 he was killed after he had bid farewell to dinner guests at the gate of his seaside villa at Bocale, near Reggio Calabria.

In 1992 four Calabrian politicians - three Christian Democrats and a Socialist - were charged with deciding, along with five 'Ndrangheta bosses, to have ordered the assassination of Ligato. The two former MPs, one a former minister, and two former mayors of Reggio Calabria and their 'Ndrangheta associates decided to kill Ligato because he had got in the way of their business interests.

The politicians were absolved from ordering the killing in 1996. Among the 'Ndrangheta bosses who ordered the killing were Pasquale Condello, Santo Araniti, Paolo Serraino and Diego Rosmini and his namesake son.
