= Latella 'ndrina =

- Founded: 1980s
- Founder: Pasquale Latella
- Years active: 1980s-present
- Territory: Reggio Calabria
- Ethnicity: Calabrians
- Allies: De Stefano, Pelle

The Latella 'ndrina also known as Latella-Ficara 'ndrina is clan of the 'Ndrangheta, a criminal and mafia-type organisation in Calabria, Italy.

They are based in the city of Reggio Calabria, which controls the Ravagnese and Croce Valanidi quarters, allied with the Ficara, and in collaboration with the De Stefano and Pelle 'ndrina.

The current capobastone was also head of the company in Crimine, an apical structure of the Calabrian criminal organization.

== History ==
The historical capobastone of the Latella 'ndrina was Pasquale Latella, sentenced to life imprisonment, followed by his brother Giacomo, who was also imprisoned. Leadership have later passed to a third brother, Antonino Latella, identified by the collaborator Consolato Villani as the one responsible for reorganizing the “locale” of Croce Valanidi. Close relatives, including Giuseppe “Pino” Ficara, Vincenzo Ficara were in charge of reorganizing the organization after the arrests of the Latella brothers. In the 1980s, The Latella 'ndrina was involved in a feud with Chilà-Ambrogio 'ndrina, led by Giuseppe Chilà.

During the Second 'Ndrangheta war, the Latella 'ndrina joined the alliance with the De Stefano-Tegano, Libri, Zindato, and other minor 'ndrine, opposed to Pasquale Condello, Antonio Imerti and Diego Rosmini factions.

In 2013, investigations discovered tha the Latella 'ndrina, together with the Rosmini, Serraino, Audino, and Nicolò 'ndrine, formed an alliance to control the construction sector in Reggio Calabria. With the complicity of local and national entrepreneurs, the 'ndrine monopolized building activities, developing residences and houses and influencing property sales. The investigation resulted in forty-seven arrest warrants, as well as the seizure of fourteen companies and assets worth approximately 90 million euros. Those arrested were charged with mafia-type criminal association, fraudulent transfer of assets, illegal financial activity, corruption, and embezzlement. Among the individuals under investigation were lawyers, accountants, and figures from the banking sector. The investigation revealed that the allied clans had expanded their commercial and financial operations with the assistance of professionals in banking and business and extended even to other Italian regions, with numerous searches carried out in Veneto, Piedmont, Lombardy, and Apulia.

== Prominent members ==
- Antonino Latella, (arrested in 2010)
- Giuseppe Pino Ficara, born 1966 (capobastone)
