= Roccaforte del Greco =

Roccaforte del Greco / Vuni Βουνί (Greek)
- Comune
- Comune di Roccaforte del Greco
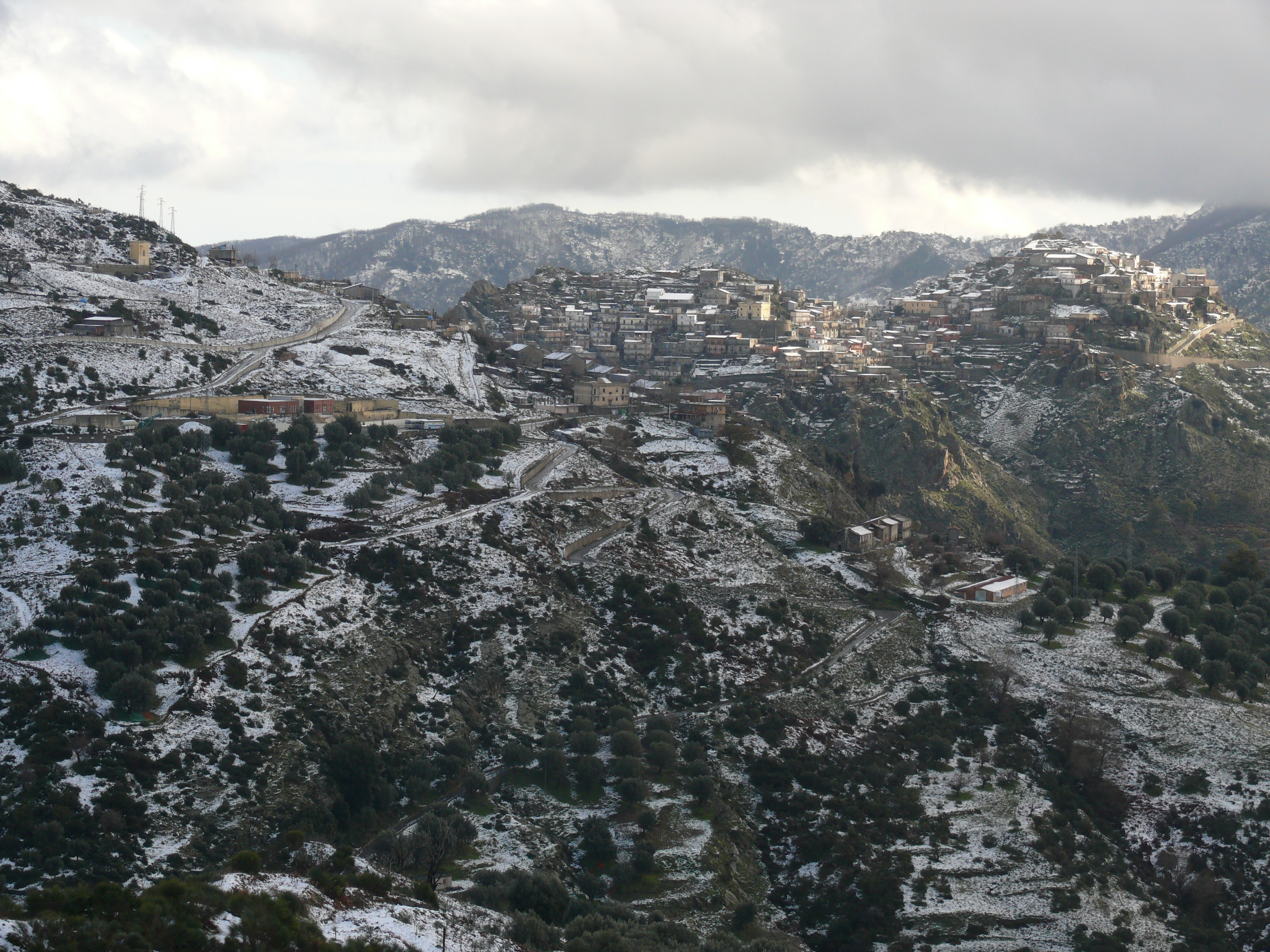
- View of Roccaforte del Greco

- Coat of arms

- Location within Italy Location within Calabria
- Coordinates: 38°3′N 15°54′E
- Country: Italy
- Region: Calabria
- Metropolitan city: Reggio Calabria (RC)
- Frazioni: Ghorio di Roccaforte

Government
  - Mayor: Domenico Penna

Area
  - Total: 43.86 km^{2} (16.93 sq mi)
- Elevation: 983 m (3,225 ft)

Population (2026)
  - Total: 291
  - Density: 6.63/km^{2} (17.2/sq mi)
- Demonym: Roccafortesi
- Time zone: UTC+1 (CET)
  - Summer (DST): UTC+2 (CEST)
- Postal code: 89060
- Dialing code: 0965
- Website: Official website

Roccaforte del Greco (Calabrian Greek: Βουνί, romanized: Vunì) is a village and comune (municipality) in the Metropolitan City of Reggio Calabria in the region of Calabria in southern Italy, located about 110 kilometres (68 mi) southwest of Catanzaro and about 20 kilometres (12 mi) southeast of Reggio Calabria. It has 291 inhabitants.

Roccaforte del Greco borders the municipalities of Bagaladi, Cardeto, Condofuri, Reggio Calabria, Roghudi, San Lorenzo, Santo Stefano in Aspromonte, Scilla, and Sinopoli.

== Demographics ==
As of 2026, the population is 291, of which 50.5% are male, and 49.5% are female. Minors make up 3.1% of the population, and seniors make up 41.6%.

Historical population

Year	Pop.	±%
1861	1,524	—
1871	1,217	−20.1%
1881	1,392	+14.4%
1901	1,392	+0.0%
1911	1,556	+11.8%
1921	2,048	+31.6%
1931	1,940	−5.3%
1936	1,933	−0.4%

Year	Pop.	±%
1951	1,778	−8.0%
1961	1,740	−2.1%
1971	1,377	−20.9%
1981	1,186	−13.9%
1991	1,213	+2.3%
2001	802	−33.9%
2011	550	−31.4%
2021	367	−33.3%

Source: ISTAT

=== Immigration ===
As of 2025, immigrants make up 2.0% of the population. The foreign countries of birth are India, Morocco, Georgia, and Romania.
