= Capo dell'Armi Lighthouse =

Lighthouse in Calabria, Italy

Capo dell'Armi
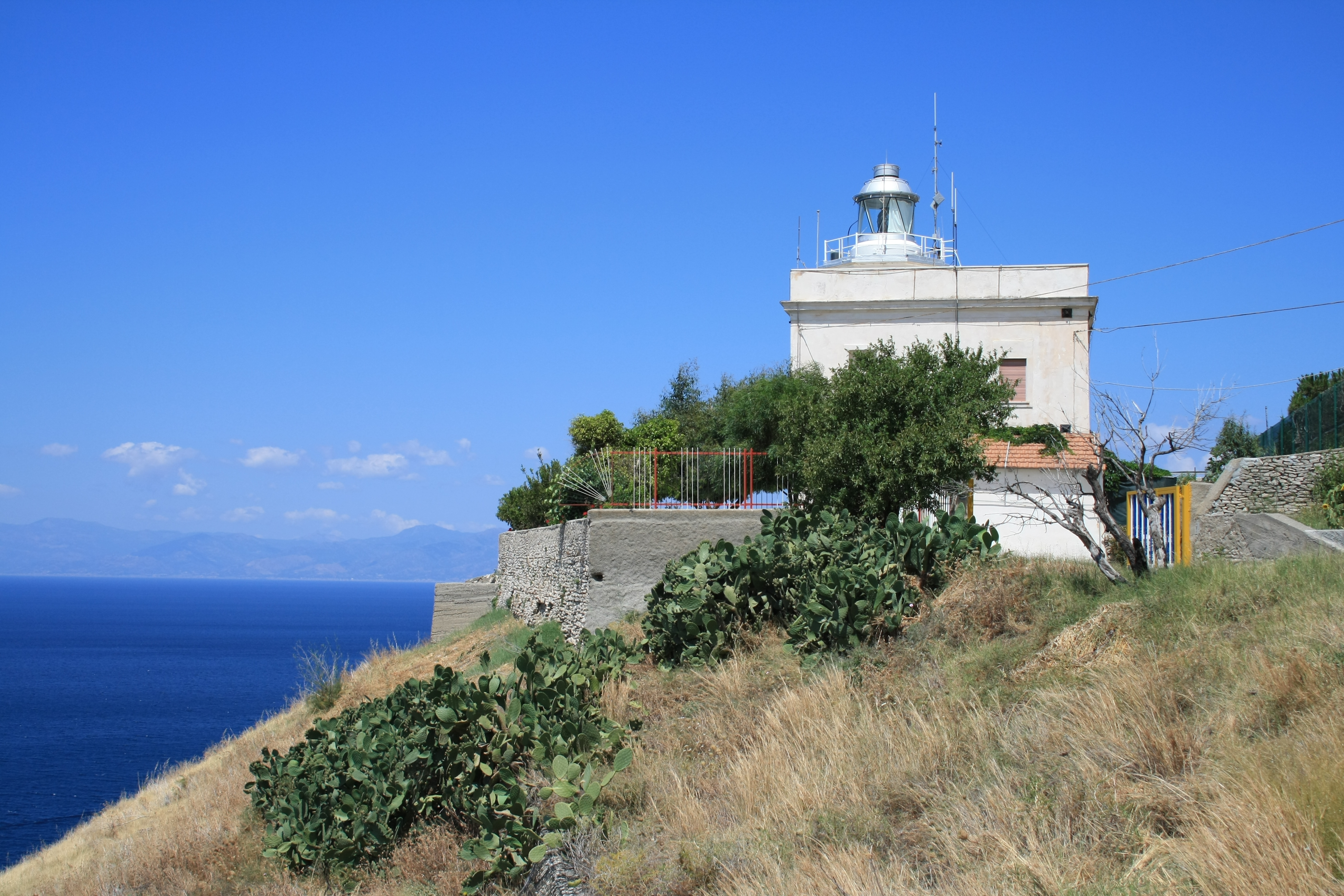
- Capo dell'Armi Lighthouse
- Location: Reggio Calabria; Italy
- Coordinates: 37°57′16″N 15°40′45″E

Tower
- Constructed: 1867
- Construction: masonry tower
- Height: 12 metres (39 ft)
- Shape: octagonal tower rising on a 2-story building
- Markings: white tower and lantern, grey lantern dome
- Power source: mains electricity
- Operator: Marina Militare

Light
- First lit: 1867
- Focal height: 95 metres (312 ft)
- Lens: Type OR 250; Focal length: 125mm
- Intensity: AL 1000 W
- Range: main: 22 nautical miles (41 km; 25 mi) reserve: 11 nautical miles (20 km; 13 mi)
- Characteristic: Fl(2) W 10s
- Italy no.: 3380 E.F

Capo dell'Armi Lighthouse (Italian: Faro di Capo dell'Armi) is an active lighthouse in Reggio Calabria, southern Italy. Located along the cliffs of the headland, in the comune of Motta San Giovanni, it is an important reference for ships coming into the Strait of Sicily from the south.

== Description ==
The lighthouse, built in 1867 and renovated in 1959, consists of an octagonal masonry tower, 12 metres (39 ft) high, with balcony and lantern rising from a 2-storey brick keeper's house. The tower is painted white and the lantern dome in grey metallic.

The light is positioned at 95 metres (312 ft) above sea level and emits two white flashes in a 10 seconds period, visible up to a distance of 22 nautical miles (41 km; 25 mi). The lighthouse is completely automated and managed by the Marina Militare with the identification code number 3380 E.F.

== See also ==
- List of lighthouses in Italy
