= Bagaladi =

Municipality in Calabria, Italy

Bagaladi Βαγαλάδες/Vagalades (Greek)
- Comune
- Comune di Bagaladi
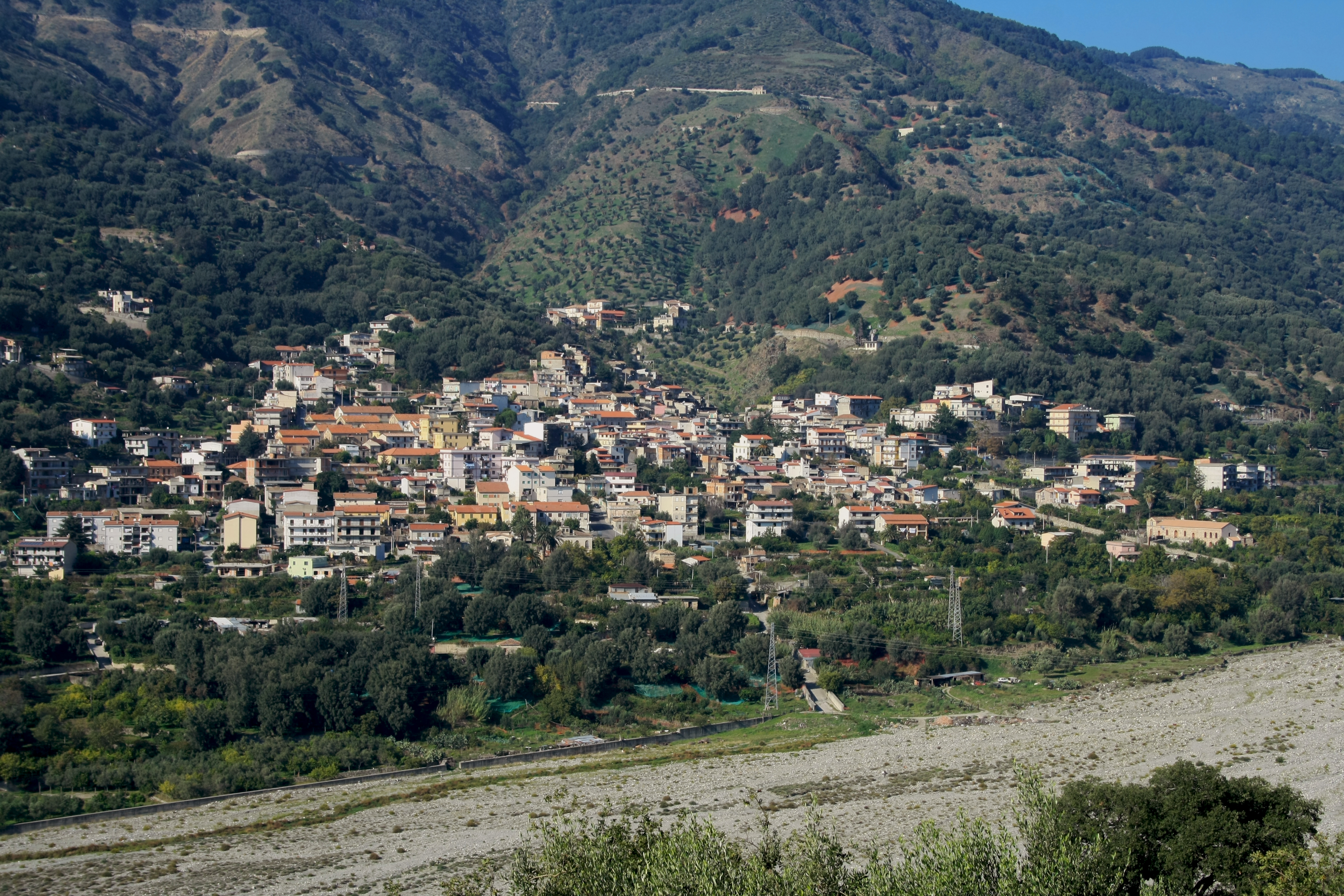

- Location within Italy Location within Calabria
- Coordinates: 38°2′N 15°49′E
- Country: Italy
- Region: Calabria
- Metropolitan city: Reggio Calabria (RC)

Government
  - Mayor: Santo Monorchio

Area
  - Total: 30.02 km^{2} (11.59 sq mi)
- Elevation: 460 m (1,510 ft)

Population (2025)
  - Total: 935
  - Density: 31.1/km^{2} (80.7/sq mi)
- Demonym: Bagaladesi
- Time zone: UTC+1 (CET)
  - Summer (DST): UTC+2 (CEST)
- Postal code: 89060
- Dialing code: 0965
- Website: Official website

Bagaladi (Calabrian Greek: Βαγαλάδες/Vagalades) is a municipality (Italian: comune) in the Metropolitan City of Reggio Calabria in the Italian region Calabria, located about 120 kilometres (75 mi) southwest of Catanzaro and about 15 kilometres (9 mi) southeast of Reggio Calabria. It has 935 inhabitants.

Bagaladi borders the following municipalities: Cardeto, Montebello Ionico, Reggio Calabria, Roccaforte del Greco, San Lorenzo.

== Demographics ==
Historical population

Year	Pop.	±%
1861	1,368	—
1871	1,428	+4.4%
1881	1,512	+5.9%
1901	1,839	+21.6%
1911	2,135	+16.1%
1921	2,132	−0.1%
1931	2,418	+13.4%
1936	2,420	+0.1%

Year	Pop.	±%
1951	2,286	−5.5%
1961	2,131	−6.8%
1971	2,022	−5.1%
1981	1,523	−24.7%
1991	1,437	−5.6%
2001	1,286	−10.5%
2011	1,082	−15.9%
2021	953	−11.9%

Source: ISTAT
