= Dacian fortress of Bâzdâna =

- Location within Romania
- 44.1512°N 23.8300°E
- Location: Bâzdâna, Dolj, Romania

Site notes
- Excavation dates: 1981 - 1989; 1993 - 1997
- Archaeologists: Corneliu Mărgărit Tătulea; Vlad Vintilă Zirra

Monument istoric
- Reference no.: DJ-I-s-A-07872

It was a Dacian fortified town.
