= Motta San Giovanni =

- Comune
- Comune di Motta San Giovanni
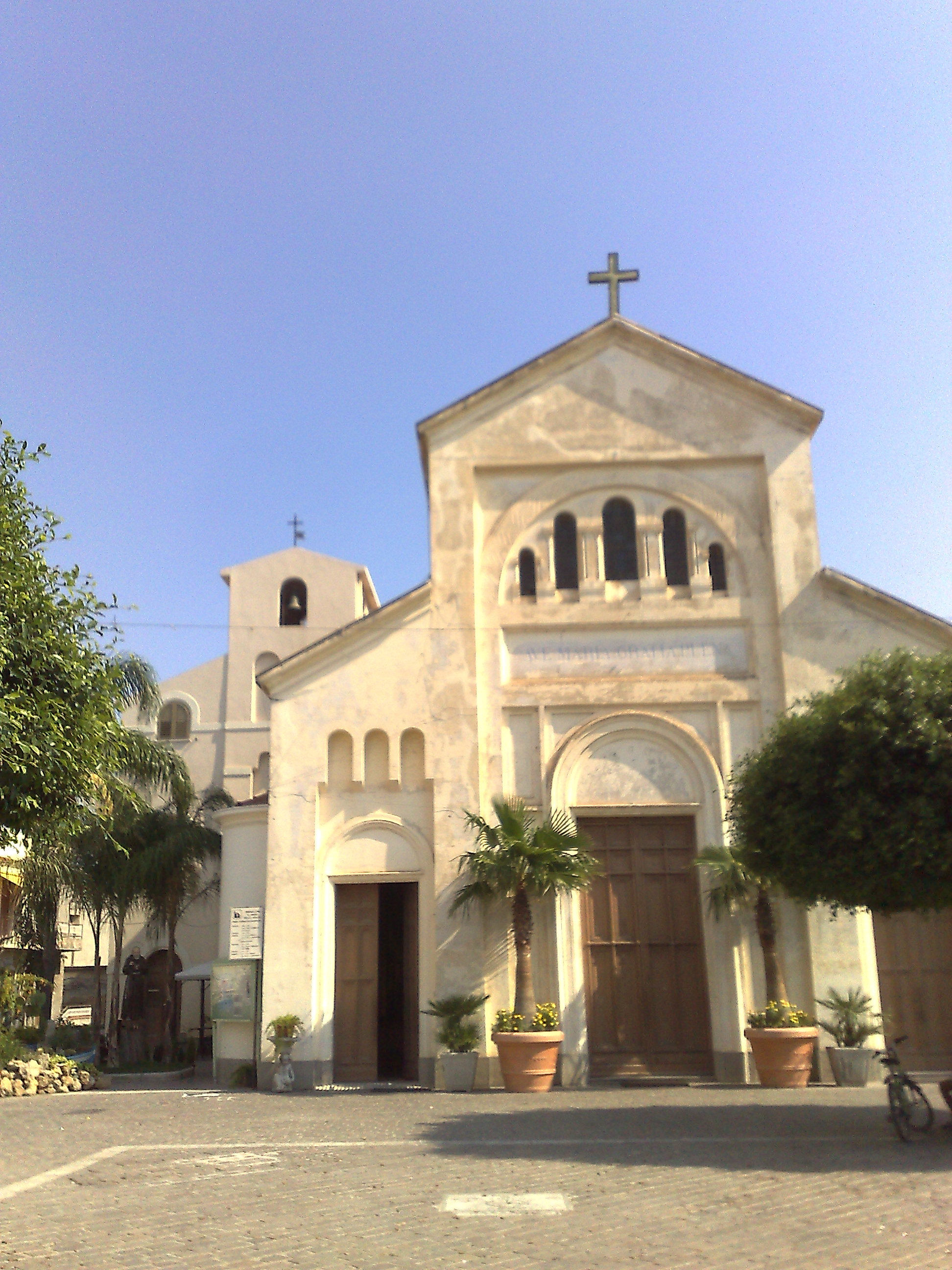
- Chiesa Santa Maria delle Grazie

- Coat of arms

- Location within Italy Location within Calabria
- Coordinates: 38°0′N 15°42′E
- Country: Italy
- Region: Calabria
- Metropolitan city: Reggio Calabria (RC)
- Frazioni: Lazzaro, Valanidi, Cambareri, Allai

Government
  - Mayor: Paolo Laganà

Area
  - Total: 46.7 km^{2} (18.0 sq mi)
- Elevation: 450 m (1,480 ft)

Population (November 2008)
  - Total: 6,428
  - Density: 138/km^{2} (356/sq mi)
- Demonym: Mottesi
- Time zone: UTC+1 (CET)
  - Summer (DST): UTC+2 (CEST)
- Postal code: 89065
- Dialing code: 0965
- Patron saint: St. John the Evangelist
- Saint day: December 27
- Website: Official website

Motta San Giovanni is a comune (municipality) in the Province of Reggio Calabria in the Italian region Calabria, located about 130 km (81 mi) southwest of Catanzaro and about 13 km (8.1 mi) southeast of Reggio Calabria. In antiquity it had the Greek toponym Leucopetra (i.e. "white stone").

Motta San Giovanni borders the municipalities of Montebello Ionico and Reggio Calabria.

The most interesting feature of the comune is the Castle of Sant'Aniceto, a notable example of Byzantine-Norman architecture. The Capo dell'Armi Lighthouse is also located in the comune along the clifftops.

== See also ==
- Capo dell'Armi Lighthouse
