= Saline Joniche =

Human settlement in Montebello Ionico, Metropolitan City of Reggio Calabria, Italy

Coordinates: 37.9434°N 15.7115°E

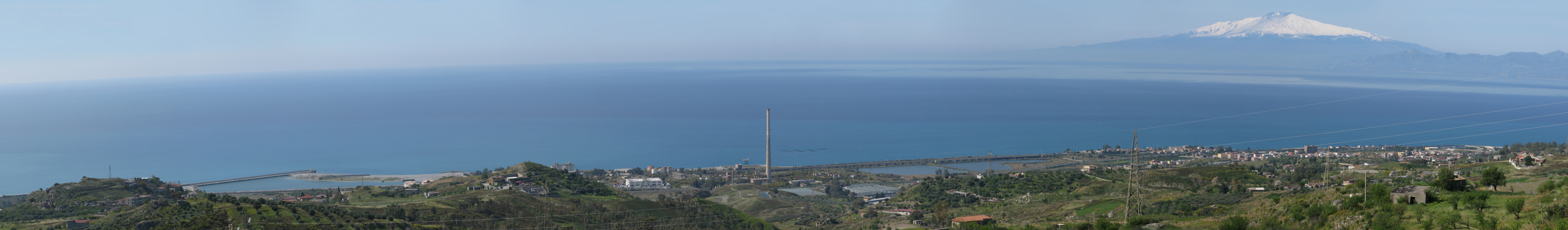

Saline Joniche is a town in Calabria, administratively part of the municipality of Montebello Jonico, with approximately 2,460 inhabitants. It lies in the extreme southern tip of the Italian Peninsula.

This frazione is the birthplace of the Italian immigrant Salvatore Alati, later known as Samuel A. Alito Sr., the father of U.S. Supreme Court Justice Samuel Alito..
