= Domenico Libri =

Italian mafia boss

- Mugshot of 'Ndrangheta boss Domenico Libri
- Born: 24 May 1934; Reggio Calabria, Italy
- Died: 1 May 2006 (aged 71); Naples, Italy
- Other name: Don Mico
- Occupation: Capobastone of the Libri 'ndrina
- Status: Deceased (imprisoned from 1992)
- Allegiance: Libri 'ndrina / 'Ndrangheta
- Criminal charges: Mafia-type association multiple murders
- Penalty: Life imprisonment

Domenico Libri (Italian pronunciation: [doˈmeːniko ˈliːbri]; 24 May 1934 – 1 May 2006), also known as Don Mico, was an Italian criminal and a member of the 'Ndrangheta in Calabria. Libri was a fugitive from June 1989 and his name was on the list of most wanted fugitives in Italy until his capture in September 1992. At the time he was considered to be the 'Ndrangheta’s number one.

== 'Ndrangheta heritage ==
The Libri 'ndrina, headed by Domenico and his brother Pasquale, dominated the Cannavò neighbourhood of Reggio Calabria. They moved into construction and were able to win public contracts for their company Edilizia Reggina due to their contacts with politicians, such as Riccardo Misasi, a former Christian Democrat Education Minister.

Libri's first arrest was in 1962, for illegal possession of firearms. In the following years multiple arrests and short prison sentences followed on charges for fraud, extortion, instigation to murder, murder, drug trafficking and criminal association.

== Second 'Ndrangheta war ==
Libri was closely connected to the De Stefano clan and sided with them when the so-called second 'Ndrangheta war broke out in 1985. After the murder of Paolo De Stefano on 13 October 1985, Libri succeeded him as the leader of the alliance with Giovanni Tegano. The bloody six-year war (1985–1991) between the Condello-Imerti clan and De Stefano-Tegano-Libri-Latella clan left 621 deaths.

In the midst of the 'Ndrangheta war he was arrested on 13 October 1986, in Milan (he had been banned by the court to reside in Calabria). Libri became one of the principal targets of the opposing clans. While in prison, a sniper killed his son Pasquale Rocco Libri on 10 September 1988, as he was strolling in the prison yard. Six months later, on 17 March 1989, a sniper just missed Don Mico Libri, surrounded by Carabinieri, when he was leaving the court in Reggio Calabria where he had to appear in a trial against the 'Ndrangheta.

== Fugitive ==
He obtained a medical release for arteriopathy, which forced him to walk with a crutch. After being released from the hospital on 2 June 1989, Libri managed to escape his escort of eight Carabinieri and went on the run. While on the run he returned to his strongly protected villa in Reggio Calabria to continue the war against rival clans.

A peace for the bloody feud was brokered in September 1991 on the instigation of Domenico Libri. The conflict was settled with the help of other 'Ndrangheta bosses. Antonio Nirta, head of the San Luca locale vouched for the De Stefano-Tegano and Libri, while Antonio Mammoliti vouched for the Condello-Imerti clan. Libri became a member of Camera di Controllo, a provincial commission of the 'Ndrangheta formed at the end of the Second 'Ndrangheta war in September 1991, to avoid further internal conflicts.

== Arrested in France ==
On 17 September 1992, he was arrested in Marseille (France). He was extradited to Italy. While on trial for murders and criminal association and his role in the Second 'Ndrangheta war, he was released for medical reasons and placed under house arrest. According to prosecutor Salvatore Boemi the release was "a slap in the face for those who have worked for the restoration of justice in Calabria". His son Antonio Libri, also on the list of most wanted fugitives in Italy, was arrested on 23 May 2000.

In April 2002, he received six life sentences for 18 murders and criminal association in the Olimpia Trial against the 'Ndrangheta. In and out of prison for medical reasons, he was arrested again in March 2006 in Prato where he was living under house arrest. Libri died on 1 May 2006, in the Secondigliano prison in Naples.
