= Cutro 'ndrina =

Grande Aracri 'ndrina
- Founded: 1980s
- Founder: Nicolino Grande Aracri
- Founding location: Cutro, Calabria, Italy
- Years active: 1980s-present
- Territory: Cutro in Calabria; Parma, Piacenza, Brescello, Fidenza and Salsomaggiore in Emilia-Romagna; Verona in Veneto; Cremona and Mantua in Lombardy. Abroad its present in Germany, France and Switzerland.
- Ethnicity: Calabrians
- Criminal activities: Drug trafficking, money laundering, extortion, corruption, murder

The Cutro 'ndrina (Italian: Cosca della ‘ndragheta di Cutro) or Grande Aracri 'ndrina (Cosca Grande Aracri) is a clan of the 'Ndrangheta, a criminal and mafia-type organisation in Calabria, Italy. The 'ndrina is based in Cutro, located in the province of Crotone.

In addition to its hometown, the 'ndrina is strongly present in Northern Italy, specifically in Emilia-Romagna, Veneto, and Lombardy. Abroad, its present in Germany, France and Switzerland.

== History ==
The Grande Aracri 'ndrina, originally based in Cutro, rose to prominence after Nicolino Grande Aracri took over local operations in 1982. In the late 1980s and 1990s, the 'ndrina expanded its drug trafficking across Northern Italy: Emilia-Romagna, Lombardy and Liguria and into Germany, Switzerland, and France. A violent split from the Dragone 'ndrina led to multiple murders and a long-lasting internal feud.

During the 2000s, the 'ndrina allied with other groups, in particular with the Vrenna-Bonaventura 'ndrina and was involved in a bloody conflict against the Arena-Dragone alliance. Several operations, including Scacco Matto, Edilpiovra, and Grande Drago, led to arrests and confirmed their involvement in extortion, arms possession, and mafia association.

In the 2010s, the Grande Aracri 'ndrina infiltrated public contracts, extended its influence across northern Italy, and was the target of major anti-mafia operations like Aemilia, Kyterion, and Old Family. Authorities seized millions of euros in assets, and prominent members, including Nicolino and his brother, were sentenced to life imprisonment.

In the 2020s, operations such as Thomas, Farmabusiness, and Basso Profilo revealed ties between the 'ndrina and business, political, and institutional figures. In 2021, the capobastone Nicolino Grande Aracri began cooperating with authorities, marking a significant turn in the 'ndrina's history.
