= Condofuri =

Condofuri Κοντοχώρι/Kontochóri (Greek)
- Comune
- Comune di Condofuri
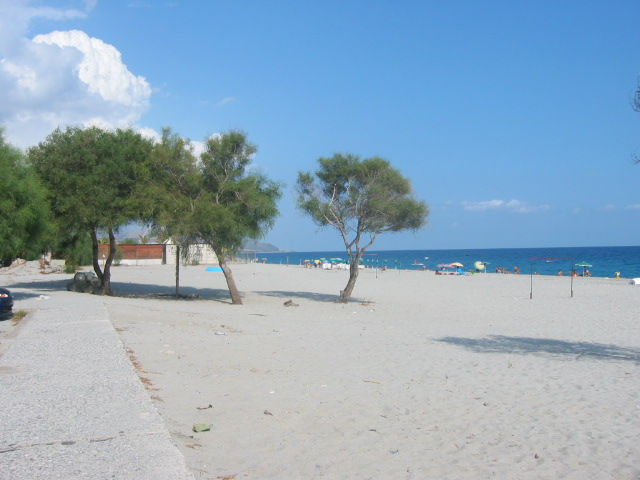

- Coat of arms

- Location within Italy Location within Calabria
- Coordinates: 38°0′N 15°52′E
- Country: Italy
- Region: Calabria
- Metropolitan city: Reggio Calabria (RC)
- Frazioni: Amendolea, Bandiera, Barone, Carcara, Gallicianò, Grotte, Lapsè, Limmara, Lugarà, Mangani, Muccari, Palermo, Plembaci, Rodì, Rossetta, San Carlo, Santa Lucia, Schiavo, Stazione

Government
  - Mayor: Tommaso Iaria (Rilanciamo Condofuri-Tommaso Iaria sindaco)

Area
  - Total: 60.30 km^{2} (23.28 sq mi)
- Elevation: 339 m (1,112 ft)

Population (2025)
  - Total: 4,490
  - Density: 74.5/km^{2} (193/sq mi)
- Demonym: Condofuresi
- Time zone: UTC+1 (CET)
  - Summer (DST): UTC+2 (CEST)
- Postal code: 89030
- Dialing code: 0965
- Website: Official website

Condofuri (Calabrian Greek: Κοντοχώρι, romanized: Kontochṓri) is a comune (municipality) in the Metropolitan City of Reggio Calabria in the region Calabria in Italy, located about 120 kilometres (75 mi) southwest of Catanzaro and about 38 kilometres (24 mi) southeast of Reggio Calabria. It has 4,490 inhabitants.

Condofuri borders the following municipalities: Bova, Bova Marina, Roccaforte del Greco, Roghudi, San Lorenzo.

== Demographics ==
As of 2025, there are 4,490 people residing in Condofuri, of whom 48.3% are male and 51.7% are female. Minors make up 15.0% of the population, and pensioners make up 26.6%. This compares with the Italian average of 14.9% minors and 24.7% pensioners.

Historical population

Year	Pop.	±%
1861	2,718	—
1871	2,442	−10.2%
1881	2,586	+5.9%
1901	3,636	+40.6%
1911	4,171	+14.7%
1921	4,384	+5.1%
1931	4,825	+10.1%
1936	5,168	+7.1%

Year	Pop.	±%
1951	5,865	+13.5%
1961	5,777	−1.5%
1971	5,447	−5.7%
1981	5,316	−2.4%
1991	5,461	+2.7%
2001	5,055	−7.4%
2011	5,074	+0.4%
2021	4,677	−7.8%

Source: ISTAT
