= Amendolea =

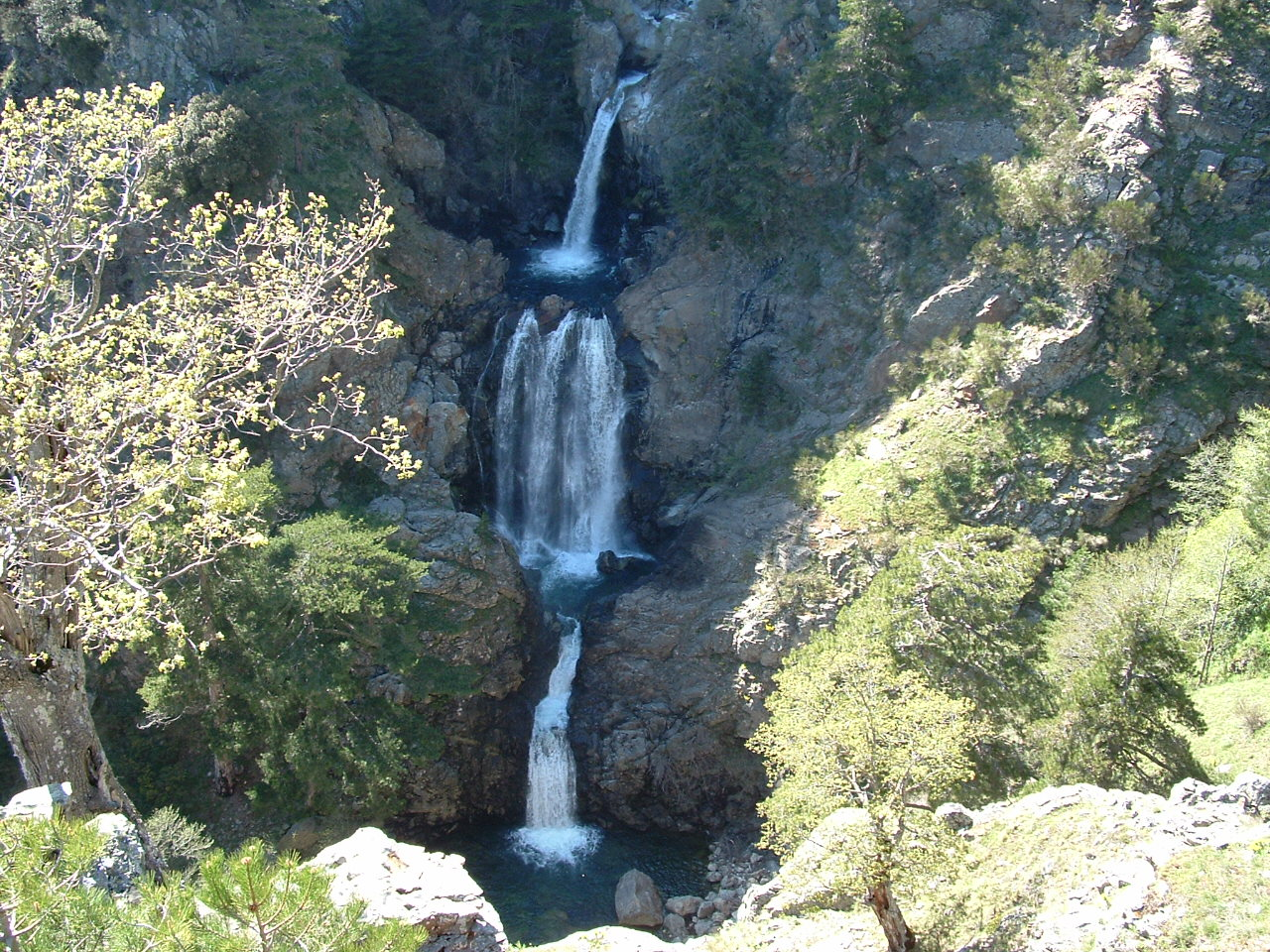

Location
- Country: Italy

Physical characteristics
- Source
  - location: Aspromonte
  - elevation: 1,805 m (5,922 ft)
- Mouth: Ionian Sea
  - coordinates: 37.9267°N 15.8886°E
- Length: 68.75 km (42.72 mi)
- Basin size: 150.4 km^{2} (58.1 sq mi)

The Amendolea (Greek: Ποταμός Αμεντολέα from Greek "αμυγδαλέα" (=αμυγδαλιά)) is a river in the province of Reggio Calabria in the Calabria region of southern Italy. Its source is near Montalto in Aspromonte National Park. The river flows south past Roghudi and Condofuri and empties into the Ionian Sea west of Bova Marina. It has a drainage basin of 150.4 square kilometres (58.1 sq mi).
