= San Lorenzo, Calabria =

San Lorenzo Àgios Lavrèntis (Greek)
- Comune
- Comune di San Lorenzo
- Coat of arms

- Location within Italy Location within Calabria
- Coordinates: 38°1′N 15°50′E
- Country: Italy
- Region: Calabria
- Metropolitan city: Reggio Calabria (RC)
- Frazioni: San Pantaleone, SantaMaria, San Fantino, Lanzina, Marina di San Lorenzo

Government
  - Mayor: Francesco Picone (commissario prefettizio)

Area
  - Total: 64.2 km^{2} (24.8 sq mi)
- Elevation: 787 m (2,582 ft)

Population (December 2007)
  - Total: 2,916
  - Density: 45.4/km^{2} (118/sq mi)
- Demonym: Laurentini
- Time zone: UTC+1 (CET)
  - Summer (DST): UTC+2 (CEST)
- Postal code: 89069
- Dialing code: 0965
- Patron saint: San Lorenzo
- Website: Official website

San Lorenzo is a comune (municipality) in the Province of Reggio Calabria in the Italian region Calabria, located about 120 kilometres (75 mi) southwest of Catanzaro and about 20 kilometres (12 mi) southeast of Reggio Calabria.

San Lorenzo borders the following municipalities: Bagaladi, Condofuri, Melito di Porto Salvo, Montebello Ionico, Roccaforte del Greco.
