= Calopăr =

- Commune
- Location in Romania
- Coordinates: 44°10′N 23°46′E
- Country: Romania
- County: Dolj

Government
  - Mayor (2020–2024): Daniel Bobin (PNL)
- Area: 50.82 km^{2} (19.62 sq mi)
- Elevation: 139 m (456 ft)
- Population (2021-12-01): 3,667
  - Density: 72/km^{2} (190/sq mi)
- Time zone: EET/EEST (UTC+2/+3)
- Postal code: 207010
- Vehicle reg.: DJ
- Website: www.uatcalopar.ro

Calopăr is a commune in Dolj County, Oltenia, Romania with a population of 3,723 people. It is composed of five villages: Belcinu, Bâzdâna, Calopăr, Panaghia, and Sălcuța.

The commune is located in the east-central part of the county and belongs to the Craiova metropolitan area.

The remnants of a Dacian fortress have been discovered in Bâzdâna.
