= Montebello Jonico =

- Comune
- Comune di Montebello Jonico
- Coat of arms

- Location within Italy Location within Calabria
- Coordinates: 37°59′N 15°46′E
- Country: Italy
- Region: Calabria
- Metropolitan city: Reggio Calabria (RC)
- Frazioni: Fossato Jonico, Masella, Saline Joniche

Government
  - Mayor: Maria Foti

Area
  - Total: 55.7 km^{2} (21.5 sq mi)
- Elevation: 425 m (1,394 ft)

Population (November 2008)
  - Total: 6,499
  - Density: 117/km^{2} (302/sq mi)
- Demonym(s): montebellesi (Italian); muntibeddhìsi (Calabrian)
- Time zone: UTC+1 (CET)
  - Summer (DST): UTC+2 (CEST)
- Postal code: 89064
- Dialing code: 0965
- Website: Official website

Montebello Jonico is a comune (municipality) in the Province of Reggio Calabria in the Italian region Calabria, located about 130 kilometres (81 mi) southwest of Catanzaro and about 15 kilometres (9 mi) southeast of Reggio Calabria.

Montebello Jonico borders the following municipalities: Bagaladi, Melito di Porto Salvo, Motta San Giovanni, Reggio Calabria, and San Lorenzo.
