= Panagia (island) =

Greek island in the Ionian Sea

Παναγία
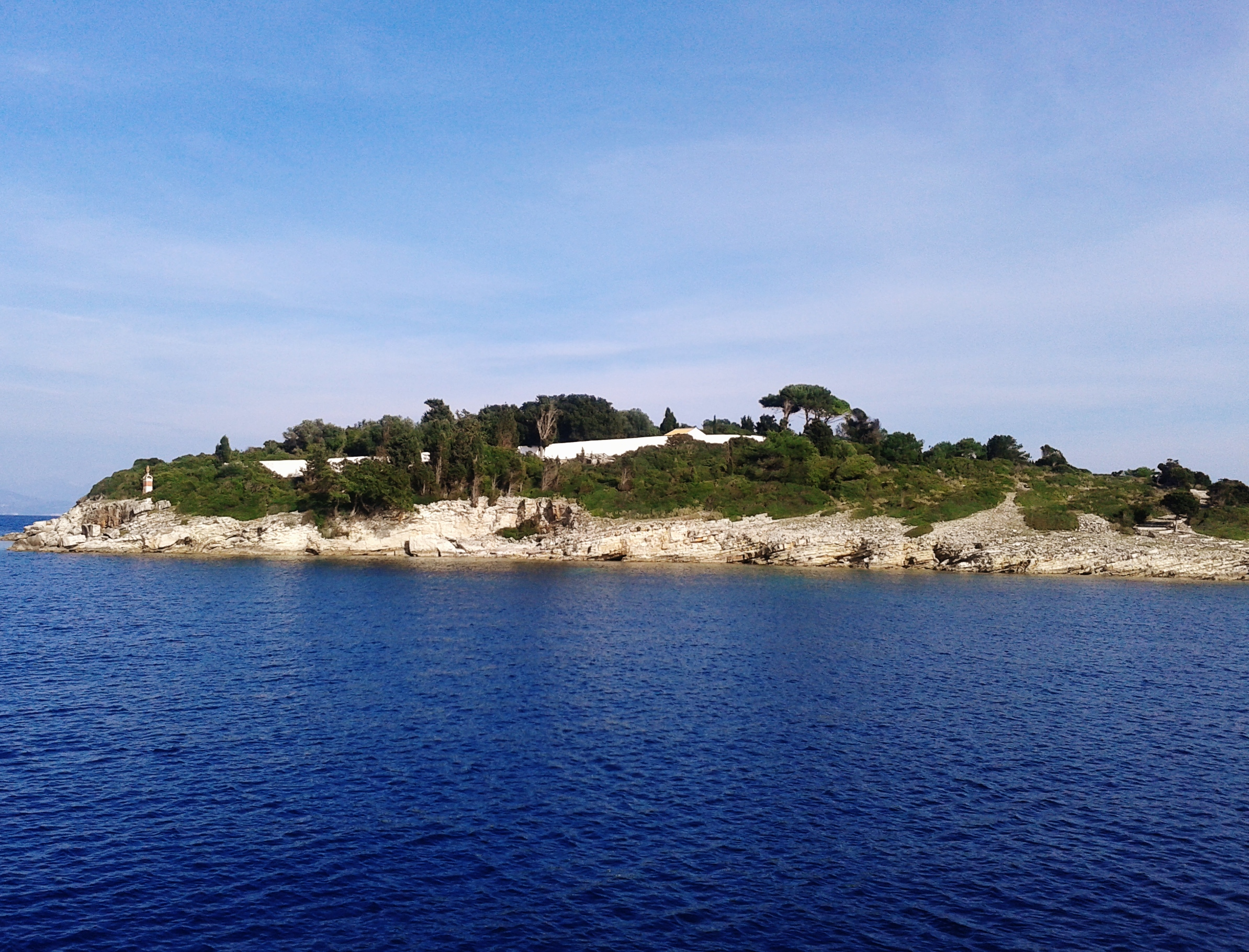

- Location within Greece

Geography
- Coordinates: 39.204°N 20.194°E
- Archipelago: Ionian Islands
- Highest elevation: 187 m (614 ft)

Administration
- Greece
- Region: Ionian Islands
- Regional unit: Corfu

Demographics
- Population: 0 (2021)

Additional information
- Vehicle registration: EM

Panagia (Greek: Παναγία, pronounced [panaˈʝia]) is a small uninhabited Greek island off the coast of Paxoi, the lesser of the Ionian Islands. It lies 200 m off the east coast of Paxoi, close to the main town Gaios. It has been a recognized settlement of Gaios from 18 December 1920, until 4 December 1994, when it consolidated into Paxos.
