= Pellaro =

Coordinates: 38°01′N 15°39′E

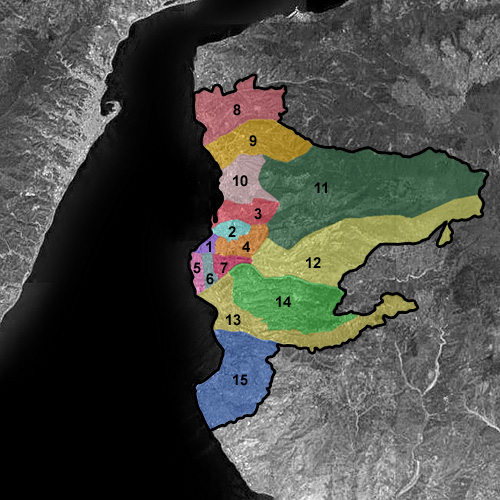
The territory of the municipality of Reggio Calabria and the division and numbering of the districts with Pellaro as 15

Pellaro is the southernmost quarter of the commune of Reggio Calabria, southern Italy. It has approximately 35,789 inhabitants.

The town is located on the 38° latitude, which is shared by the cities of Seoul, Athens, San Francisco and Córdoba. A monument was erected in 1987 to indicate this.

== History ==
The location has been inhabited since the times of Greater Greece, and is surrounded by hills.

The Romans conquered the city in 272 BC. Local forests were used to supply Rome with timber for ships of war, and the port was a strategic location for trade with the East.

In 1908, the earthquake and associated tsunami that hit Reggio Calabria destroyed much of the city and killed over a thousand inhabitants.

In 1927, during the Fascist regime, admiral Giuseppe Genoese Zerbi included Pellaro within the commune of Reggio Calabria.

== Economy ==
Today Pellaro, with its beach, is a popular tourist location. Pellaro is also a windsurfing and kitesurfing location.

The city also produces wine from grapes sourced from local vineyards, reputed to be derived from ancient Greek colonies.

== See also ==
- Calabrian wine
