= Diego Rosmini =

Member of the 'Ndrangheta (1927-2002)

- Born: July 16, 1927; Reggio Calabria, Kingdom of Italy
- Died: March 11, 2002 (aged 74); Secondigliano, Naples, Italy
- Occupation: Capobastone of the Rosmini 'ndrina
- Allegiance: Rosmini 'ndrina / 'Ndrangheta

Diego Rosmini (16 July 1927 – 11 March 2002), also known as Direttore, was an Italian criminal and a member of the 'Ndrangheta, a Mafia-type organization, in Calabria. He was the boss of the Rosmini 'ndrina based in the city of Reggio Calabria. He was born in Reggio Calabria.

== Second 'Ndrangheta war ==
The Rosmini clan was a protagonist in the Second 'Ndrangheta war (1985–1991), which grouped all the 'ndrine in the city of Reggio Calabria into either one of two opposing factions: the Condello, Imerti, Serraino and Rosmini 'ndrine on one side, and the De Stefano, Tegano, Libri and Latella 'ndrine on the other.

== Arrest and convictions ==
Rosmini was arrested on 4 December 1990, and received a life sentence and an additional 15-year sentence for murder and Mafia association. In 1998, he received a life sentence for ordering the killing in 1989 of the Christian Democrat politician Lodovico Ligato, former head of the Italian State Railways. Ligato demanded a 10 percent bribe on public work contracts, jeopardizing agreements already reached among a so-called "business committee" of local politicians and 'Ndrangheta groups. In March 2001, he received another life sentence.

Rosmini died on 11 March 2002 due to cardiovascular and respiratory illness at the clinical centre of the Secondigliano prison, in Naples. His nephew Diego Rosmini, known as junior (he was born in 1955), took over the leadership of the clan.
