= Cardeto =

Cardeto Καρδία (Greek)
- Comune
- Comune di Cardeto
- Location within Italy Location within Calabria
- Coordinates: 38°5′N 15°46′E
- Country: Italy
- Region: Calabria
- Metropolitan city: Reggio Calabria (RC)
- Frazioni: Pantano, Mannarella, Sant'Elia, Mallamaci, Cartalimi, Iriti, Piraino, Colachecco, Loddini, Castanea, Chimputo, Ambele, Lamberta, Giurricando, Garcea, Calvario, Scranò, Scala

Government
  - Mayor: Crocefissa Daniela Arfuso

Area
  - Total: 37.27 km^{2} (14.39 sq mi)
- Elevation: 750 m (2,460 ft)

Population (2025)
  - Total: 1,269
  - Density: 34.05/km^{2} (88.19/sq mi)
- Demonym: Cardetesi
- Time zone: UTC+1 (CET)
  - Summer (DST): UTC+2 (CEST)
- Postal code: 89060
- Dialing code: 0965
- Website: Official website

Cardeto (Calabrian Greek: Καρδία) is a municipality in the Metropolitan City of Reggio Calabria in the region of Calabria in Italy, located about 120 kilometres (75 mi) southwest of Catanzaro and about 10 kilometres (6 mi) southeast of Reggio Calabria. It has 1,269 inhabitants.

Cardeto borders the following municipalities: Bagaladi, Reggio Calabria, Roccaforte del Greco.

== Demographics ==
As of 2025, there are 1,269 people residing in Cardeto, of whom 47.4% are male and 51.7% are female. Minors make up 10.2% of the population, and pensioners make up 34.8%. This compares with the Italian average of 14.9% minors and 24.7% pensioners.

Historical population

Year	Pop.	±%
1861	1,733	—
1871	1,870	+7.9%
1881	1,902	+1.7%
1901	2,305	+21.2%
1911	2,358	+2.3%
1921	2,447	+3.8%
1931	2,908	+18.8%
1936	2,958	+1.7%

Year	Pop.	±%
1951	3,404	+15.1%
1961	3,479	+2.2%
1971	3,366	−3.2%
1981	3,220	−4.3%
1991	2,825	−12.3%
2001	2,325	−17.7%
2011	1,822	−21.6%
2021	1,361	−25.3%

Source: ISTAT
