= Libri 'ndrina =

- Founded: 1950s
- Founder: Domenico Libri; Pasquale Libri
- Founding location: Reggio Calabria, Calabria, Italy
- Years active: 1950s-present
- Territory: Mainly in the city of Reggio Calabria.
- Ethnicity: Calabrians
- Criminal activities: Drug trafficking, money laundering, arms trafficking, extortion, corruption, murder
- Allies: De Stefano 'ndrina
- Rivals: Imerti 'ndrina Serraino 'ndrina

The Libri 'ndrina is a clan of the 'Ndrangheta, a criminal and mafia-type organisation in Calabria, Italy. The 'ndrina is based in Reggio Calabria, having its stronghold in the Cannavò district.

The Libri 'ndrina is historically allied to the De Stefano-Tegano 'ndrina, also from Reggio Calabria.

== History ==
The Libri ‘ndrina, which was founded by the brothers Domenico and Pasquale Libri, began operating in the immediate Post-World War II period and reached its peak during the 1960s and 1970s.

Don Mico Libri's first arrest was in 1962, for illegal possession of firearms. In the following years multiple arrests and short prison sentences followed on charges for fraud, extortion, instigation to murder, murder, drug trafficking and criminal association. Libri, who officially presented himself as a foreman at the Cozzupoli construction firm and later a powerful entrepreneur, co-owned Edilizia Reggina with his brother Pasquale. Their company monopolized public works contracts in Reggio Calabria and collaborated with major national firms. The Libri family accumulated substantial wealth and built a bunker-style villa in the Cannavò district, which was later confiscated by the Reggio Calabria Tribunal's preventive measures section, along with other assets valued at six billion lire.

During the Second 'Ndrangheta war, Don Mico Libri, lost a significant number of affiliates, including his own son, Pasquale Rocco Libri, who was assassinated during prison yard time at the San Pietro prison in Reggio Calabria in September 1988. The killing was carried out by a sniper whose marksmanship was described as “Olympic-level.” Six months later, on 17 March 1989, a sniper just missed Don Mico Libri, surrounded by Carabinieri, when he was leaving the court in Reggio Calabria where he had to appear in a trial against the 'Ndrangheta.

The structure and strength of the Libri 'ndrina are such that, according to police and Carabinieri files, it is considered one of the most aggressive and entrenched in the city of Reggio Calabria. Their main activities includes drug and arms trafficking, extortion, prostitution, illegal labor exploitation, and infiltration into local institutions and public services.

In September 1992, Domenico Libri was arrested upon arrival at the Marseille Provence Airport after disembarking from a flight from Paris. Libri had been a fugitive since 5 June 1989, when he escaped from the hospital of Busto Arsizio while under limited custody, exploiting a medical permit granted due to circulatory problems. Previously arrested in Milan in 1986 during a large police operation, Libri had been serving time related to mafia association charges.

In April 2002, Don Mico Libri received six life sentences for 18 murders and criminal association in the Olimpia Trial against the 'Ndrangheta. In and out of prison for medical reasons, he was arrested again in March 2006 in Prato where he was living under house arrest. Libri died on 1 May 2006, in the Secondigliano prison in Naples.

In August 2017, Pasquale Libri died of natural causes at his home in Cannavò, after a long illness. Despite being under house arrest for health reasons, Pasquale faced multiple arrest warrants and new charges in recent years. His funeral was held privately and discreetly at the Nuovo Condera cemetery.

In 2019, a major police operation targeting the Libri 'ndrina led to 17 precautionary measures, including 12 arrests and 5 house arrests. Among those arrested are Sebastiano “Seby” Romeo, the Democratic Party group leader in the Calabria regional council, placed under house arrest, and Alessandro Nicolò, initially elected with Forza Italia and later moved to Fratelli d'Italia, who was imprisoned and subsequently expelled from FdI. The investigation, known as "Libro Nero," revealed that several politicians, entrepreneurs, and even a law enforcement officer were serving the 'ndrina. According to the investigations, the Libris exerted influence over various economic sectors, including construction, real estate, and restaurants, controlling multiple companies worth millions of euros. They were also involved in political manipulation, notably influencing the 2014 regional elections by directing votes to their preferred candidates in exchange for favors. The inquiry uncovered an attempted corruption scheme involving a law enforcement officer who allegedly provided confidential information to a regional politician through a local intermediary. Among the arrested are entrepreneurs Francesco and Demetrio Berna, linked to the Libri 'ndrina, who have dominated Reggio Calabria's construction and real estate sectors.

In 2021, The 'Mercato Libero' anti-mafia operation led to the arrest of four individuals connected to the 'ndrina. The investigation uncovered a scheme of fraudulent asset transfers and attempted extortion carried out to benefit the Libri 'ndrina. As part of the operation, authorities seized shares and business assets valued at 7 million euros, including a car dealership named "Effe Motors," which sold Honda and Mazda vehicles. The seizure also included a property and a vehicle valued at 3 million euros linked to one of the suspects' family members. Overall, 23 individuals were under investigation for their roles in these illicit activities, highlighting the 'ndrina's deep involvement in manipulating economic enterprises through fictitious ownership and money laundering to strengthen their criminal influence in Reggio Calabria.
