= Second 'Ndrangheta war =

1985–1991 Italian organized crime conflict

- Date: 1985–1991
- Location: Reggio Calabria, Italy
- Caused by: Dispute over public contracts
- Result: Stalemate (see Aftermath)

Parties
Condello, Imerti, Serraino and Rosmini clans	De Stefano, Tegano, Libri and Latella clans

Lead figures
Pasquale Condello, Antonio Imerti	Paolo De Stefano, Domenico Libri, Giovanni Tegano

Casualties
- Deaths: 621 killed (according to the Antimafia Commission of the Italian Parliament)

The Second 'Ndrangheta war was an internal struggle in the 'Ndrangheta, a criminal organisation in Calabria (southern Italy). The conflict raged from 1985–1991 in Reggio Calabria. Practically all the 'ndrine in Reggio Calabria grouped into either one of two opposing factions: the Condello, Imerti, Serraino and Rosmini clans on one side, and the De Stefano, Tegano, Libri and Latella clans on the other.

== Background ==
The background of the war was a struggle over public contracts in relation with the announced construction of a bridge linking Calabria and Sicily over the Strait of Messina between Reggio Calabria and Messina. An additional motive was the attempt of the De Stefano clan to encroach on the territory of the Imertis in Villa San Giovanni, a town facing the city of Messina across the narrow strait.

== Start of the conflict ==
The feud was triggered by the marriage between Giuseppina Condello – the sister of the Condello brothers, underbosses of De Stefano – and Antonio Imerti, the leader of a neighbouring 'ndrina in Villa San Giovanni. The boss Paolo De Stefano became fearful of the new alliance that might challenge his power base. The conflict exploded in 1985, two years after the marriage and saw practically all the 'ndrine in the city of Reggio Calabria grouped into either one of two opposing factions. The De Stefano clan prepared itself for the fight through another marriage, between Orazio De Stefano, Paolo's younger brother, and Antonietta Benestare, niece of the boss Giovanni Tegano. Celebrated on December 2, 1985, the wedding sealed the alliance between the de Stefanos and the powerful Tegano clan.

The war started with a car bomb attack on Antonio Imerti in Villa San Giovanni, on October 11, 1985, which left three of his bodyguards dead. Imerti was caught as he left the building of the insurance company he ran in the shadows. Two days later Imerti retaliated when his affiliates ambushed and killed Paolo De Stefano and one of his bodyguards on October 13, 1985. The brothers Paolo and Domenico Condello were arrested in January 1988 for killing De Stefano.

Domenico Libri succeeded De Stefano as the leader of the alliance with Giovanni Tegano. Libri became one of the principal targets of the opposing clans. While in prison a sniper killed his son Pasquale Rocco Libri in September 1988, as he was strolling in the prison yard. Six months later, in March 1989, a sniper just missed Libri, surrounded by Carabinieri, when he was leaving the court in Reggio Calabria where he had to appear in a trial against the 'Ndrangheta.

== Peace ==
After nearly six years the war had neither winners nor losers. A peace for the bloody feud was brokered in September 1991 on the instigation of Domenico Libri and the Teganos. The conflict was settled with the help of other 'Ndrangheta bosses. Antonio Nirta, head of the San Luca locale vouched for the De Stefano-Tegano and Libri, while Antonio Mammoliti vouched for the Condello-Imerti clan. Another mediator for the 'pax mafiosa' was Domenico Alvaro, head of the locale of Sinopoli.

According to several turncoats (pentiti), the Sicilian Mafia was also involved in the peace process as well as 'Ndrangheta bosses from Canada, such as Joe Imerti from Toronto, a cousin of Antonio Imerti, and one of the Zito clan in Canada. According to the pentito Pasquale Barreca, a former member of the De Stefano clan, "the role of Cosa Nostra was decisive for the conclusion of the war." According to the pentito Francesco Fonti, it was Leoluca Bagarella who represented the interests of Cosa Nostra.

=== Casualties ===
The number of fatalities of the war varies between 500 and more than 1,000. In those six years, 1,038 murders were reported in the province of Reggio Calabria, more than half (564) were certainly attributable to the conflict. According to the Antimafia Commission of the Italian Parliament, 621 people were killed as a result of the feud.

== Aftermath ==
The Sicilian Mafia contributed to the end of the conflict and probably suggested the subsequent set up of a superordinate body, similar to the Sicilian Mafia Commission, to avoid further infighting. Called La Provincia (the Province) the new collegial body is composed of three lower bodies, known as mandamenti. One for the clans on the Ionic side (the mountains and Locride) of Calabria, a second for the Tyrrhenian side (the plains of Gioia Tauro) and one for the city of Reggio Calabria.

== See also ==
- First 'Ndrangheta war

== External references ==
Mafia Brotherhoods: Organized Crime, Italian Style, New York: Oxford University Press ISBN 0-19-515724-9 (Review by Klaus Von Lampe) (Review by Alexandra V. Orlova)
