= Villa San Giovanni =

Villa San Giovanni Villa San Giuanni (Sicilian)
- Comune
- Comune di Villa San Giovanni
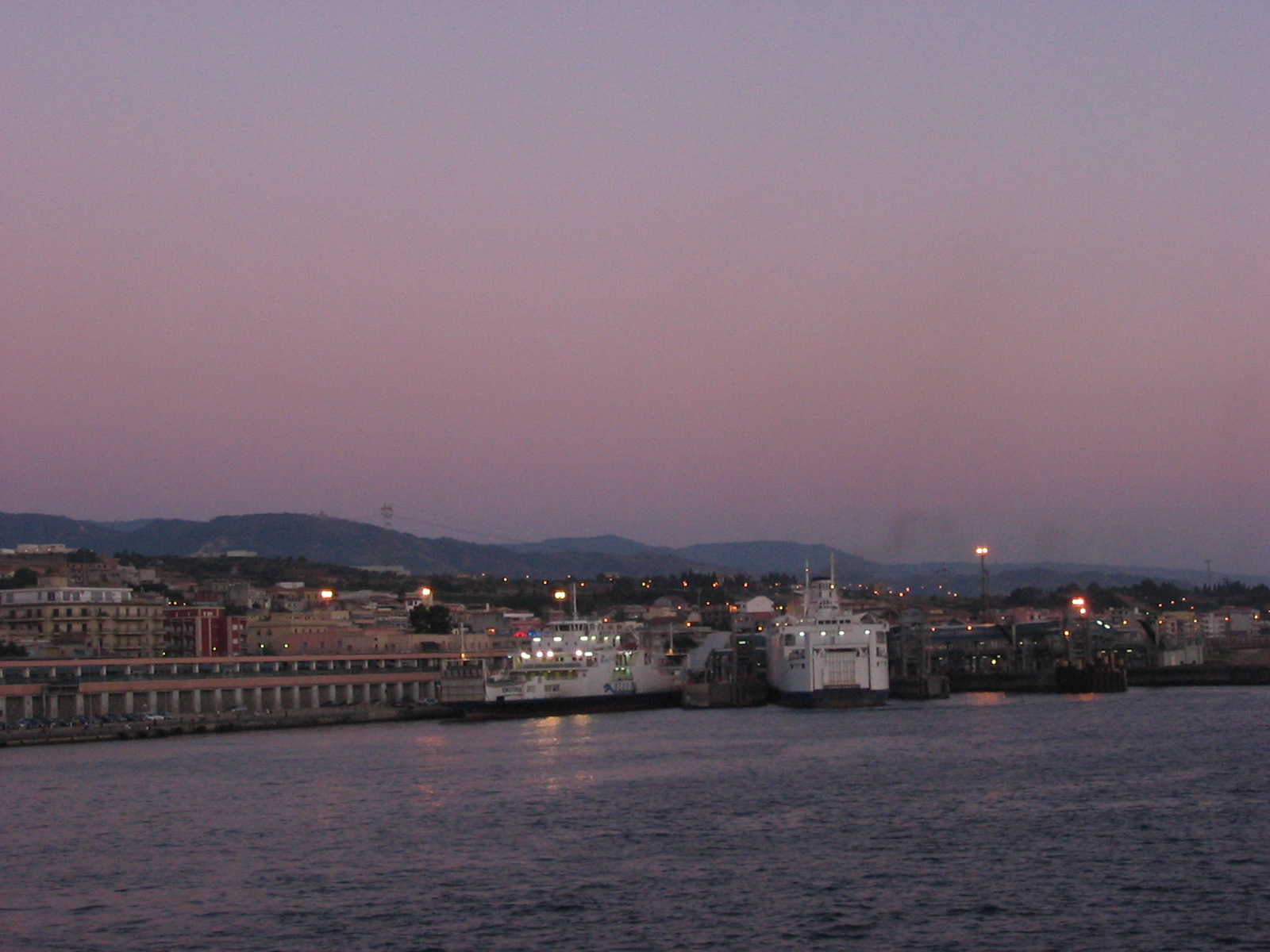

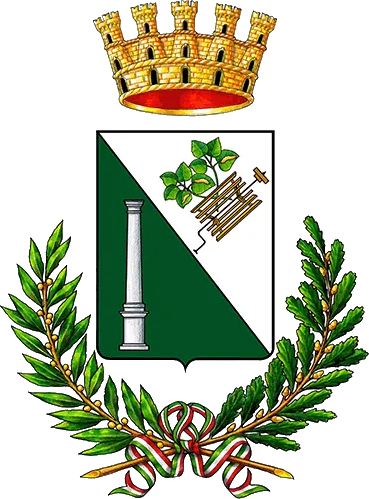
- Coat of arms

- Location within Italy Location within Calabria
- Coordinates: 38°13′N 15°38′E
- Country: Italy
- Region: Calabria
- Metropolitan city: Reggio Calabria (RC)
- Frazioni: Acciarello, Cannitello, Case Alte, Ferrito, Pezzo, Piale, Porticello

Government
  - Mayor: Giuseppina Caminiti

Area
  - Total: 12 km^{2} (4.6 sq mi)
- Elevation: 15 m (49 ft)

Population (December 31, 2025)
  - Total: 12,676
  - Density: 1,100/km^{2} (2,700/sq mi)
- Demonym: Villesi
- Time zone: UTC+1 (CET)
  - Summer (DST): UTC+2 (CEST)
- Postal code: 89018
- Dialing code: 0965
- Patron saint: St. John the Baptist
- Saint day: June 24
- Website: Official website

Villa San Giovanni (Southern Calabrian: Villa San Giuanni) is a port city and a municipality in the Metropolitan City of Reggio Calabria of Calabria, Italy. In 2025 its population was 12,676 with a decrease of 2.5% until 2016 and in 2020 an increase of 3.7%. It is an important terminal for access to Sicily and is also known for being the location of several police films.

== Geography ==
It is situated on the coast of the Strait of Messina, directly across from the city of Messina on the other side of the narrow strait. Its port serves as the primary ferry terminal for Sicily. The municipality of Villa is home to Punta Pezzo, which marks the closest point between the Calabrian shore and the Sicilian side. This geographical advantage has made the city an ideal location for crossing the strait. Notably, Punta Pezzo features a prominent lighthouse. The city encompasses several neighborhoods, including Acciarello, Cannitello, Pezzo, and Piale.

== History ==
The last decades of the sixteenth century saw the rise in the small coastal villages, such as Cannitello and Pezzo, inhabited mostly by sailors and fishermen. Further inland, at the current center of the Villa, there was a village called Fossa. Later came Piale and Acciarello. The coastal repopulation accelerated the eighteenth century progressive decline of Fiumara di Muro, until the administrative reform implemented in 1806 by Giuseppe Bonaparte definitively abolished the feudal system and the Lordship of Fiumara disappeared. On 8 January 1676 he fought a naval battle between the Dutch and the French fleet in the waters of the Strait in front of Punta Pezzo, with a victorious outcome for the French. The cannons found at Pezzo in 1902 probably date back to this battle.

=== The plague of 1743 and the fire pit ===
In 1743, there was an unfortunate incident involving the small village of Fossa. In March of that year, a Genoese ship loaded with wheat from Patras had brought the plague to Messina (that was the last major outbreak of plague in Western Europe). The Health Council of the city of Reggio Calabria had ordered all boats not to approach the port of Messina and instituted guard duty on the coast to enforce the ordinance. The Health Council of Messina denied the epidemic, so as not to interrupt the trade with the continent; however once the alarming news coming from the Sicilian town was heard, the spokespersons were not considered trustworthy and four citizens, two noble and two civilians, provided surveillance for Fossa, which then numbered no more than seventy people and Pezzo with perhaps two hundred and Acciarello, a village recently formed as a result of the exodus of the Azzarello family of Messina just because of the plague.

Throughout the month of April, confusing news of the Messina situation arrived in Naples, so the government did not take the necessary steps, while the epidemic grew enormously in that city. In the situation of isolation in which Messina found itself, many sailors and masters began to smuggle in food and basic necessities from the Calabrian side of the Strait and the resorts of Ganzirri and Torre Faro in Messina. This led to the arrival on the continent of infected products. Among these smugglers were the brothers Peter and Paul Lombardo di Fossa, originating from Fiumara. It is said that on the night of 10 June, the Sicilians, not having quite enough money to pay them, gave them a coat and Paul Lombardo accepted it and put it on: the coat was infected and soon the two brothers died because of the disease, and in the days following, their closest relatives. In any case, the epidemic came to Fossa.

Hearing the news, the two mayors of Reggio, Genovese and Giuseppe Antonio Melissari wanted to investigate the matter; so the governor, Diego Ferri, from historical sources described as a bad-tempered man and authoritarian ruler, recently appointed, sent Fossa two of the best doctors of the region, Saverio Fucetola and Francesco Marrari. The plague was ascertained by these two specialists, but did not stop the illegal smuggling with Sicily, in reality practiced by many local boats: the plague began to spread enormously even on the shores of Calabria. The governor Ferri and the two mayors then considered Fossa the scapegoat source of the epidemic and ordered an expedition against the small town. According to reports from Luigi's Prayer, on the morning of June 23, 3,200 heavily armed men departed from Reggio, of whom 200 were Swiss mercenaries and the remainder citizens of Reggio, under the leadership of Diego Ferri. Initially, the residents of Fossa tried to resist, but they had to yield.

All the inhabitants, including old men, women and children, were forced to strip naked and to be washed with oil and vinegar. The Reggio were given their clothes and personal property and then forced to march naked up to Punta Pezzo. Then the armed men returned to Reggio and the next day with artillery burned the entire village, with houses, animals, boats, trees, and quantities of oil and wine set on fire, even the Church of Maria SS.ma delle Grazie di Pezzo where it was believed that the plague had taken refuge. The Fossa people remained in miserable conditions at the beach of Pezzo for several days, without receiving any help. Ferri ordered Carlo Ruffo, Duke of Bagnara and Lord of Fiumara di Muro to provide for them, as the Fossa people were still part of the Fiumanese feud. But even the Duke did not care about them: he first denied the plague, and pretended to be irritated by the act performed by the Reggio against his employees, then dumped these charges on the University of Fiumara, promising reimbursement of expenses. But it was only sent a few beans and an ox, certainly insufficient for all the inhabitants. Only the captain of a boat that was carrying onions from Tropea took pity on them and offered his poor load. Finally, between Fossa and the neighboring towns about eighty people died from the plague. Reggini people thought they had thus preserved the city from the disease, but in early July, the disease also came to Reggio, where in a year of plague there were recorded about 5,000 deaths, with about another 500 dead of exhaustion and hunger and another 500 sentenced to death by the governor Ferri. At Messina, of 62,775 inhabitants, just 11,436 were left, that is to say that there were 51,319 deaths. Government aid was absorbed by Reggio and Messina and for the people of Fossa nothing came. Subsequently, Pope Benedict XIV sent 100,000 ducats to the countries affected by the plague, but also this time in Fossa did not touch anything of the money allocated.

==== The birth of Villa San Giovanni ====
The turning point in the history of the area occurred in the late eighteenth century, when Rocco Antonio Caracciolo, wealthy landowner and silk entrepreneur from Fossa, wanted to remove the hamlets of Fossa, Pezzo, Cannitello, Piale and Acciarello from the then University of Fiumara di Muro, thanks to the good offices of the Bourbon court of the Kingdom of Naples, in order to give political and administrative unity to small communities that are distant from each other however rivals. After a bitter confrontation with the Greek family, another important noble family of Fossese, the new center was named Fossa first and then Villa San Giovanni (the new name given by the decree of King Ferdinand IV of 6 November 1791). Villa then had a population of about 1,200 inhabitants. The town was then devastated by an earthquake on 5 February 1783. In 1797 the villagers then got to elect their own mayors (three, according to the order of the time) and the birth of the University of Villa San Giovanni, corresponding to the current municipality, can be dated to the following year.

On 7 January 1799, Cardinal Fabrizio Ruffo disembarked at Pezzo, and began his reconquest of the Kingdom of Naples; from 8 February many volunteers from the area began to join the army of the Holy Faith at Pezzo.

In 1807, Cannitello and Piale broke away from Villa, forming their own municipality, with headquarters in Cannitello, but unable to understand Pezzo, which remained inside Villa.

=== The Napoleonic period and Gioacchino Murat ===
In 1810 Gioacchino Murat, King of Naples and brother-in-law of Napoleon Bonaparte, for four months ruled the southern kingdom from the heights of Piale. He, moving from Naples to the conquest of Sicily (where King Ferdinand IV had taken refuge under the protection of the English, an army which was camped near Punta Faro in Messina), arrived in Scilla on 3 June 1810 and remained there until 5 July, when the great Piale encampment was completed. In the short period of stay, Murat built the three forts of Torre Cavallo, Altafiumara and Piale, the latter with a telegraph tower. On 26 September of the same year, seeing the conquest of Sicily as a difficult undertaking, Murat abandoned the Piale encampment and left for the capital.

The French troops were present in the strategic territory of Villa throughout the first fifteen years of the nineteenth century; this constituted a negative element for the majority of the population and for the local economy. In fact, the Napoleonic government constantly imposed extraordinary expenses on the municipalities of Villa and Cannitello for the maintenance of the troops stationed there, which often harmed the flourishing commercial activities of the city, such as the spinning mill of Rocco Antonio Caracciolo. In addition, the proximity of Villa to the Sicilian coast exposed it to warfare between the French based in Piale and the English quartered in Torre Faro. In general, however, the French also brought some good news to the Kingdom, which was maintained after the Bourbon restoration, such as public schools, post offices, banks, telegraph and (not least) legislative codification. During his presence, Murat also took care to eradicate the banditry present in the area, entrusting this task to General Charles Antoine Manhès, who obtained good results.

=== From the Bourbon Restoration to the Unity of Italy ===
In the years following the restoration of the Bourbons continued urban development of Villa, so much so that in 1817 Antonio Caracciolo Rocco oversaw the final construction and arrangement of the cemetery. Before then, the dead were buried in churches or in certain campaign funds used for this purpose. The government in those years chose Villa as the headquarters of the central post office, a new service imported by the French, as it represented the main ferry point for Sicily and one of the most important road junctions of the province. The construction of the large building destined to house the Post Office had already been contracted, and the Ristori director had already come to Villa to order the offices, when the transfer of this office to the capital city was ordered from Reggio, which obtained it. The great palace was later sold at auction to the Caminiti brothers of Domenico Antonio, who were then masters of mail for Villa and surroundings.

In 1823 it was decided that Florio's first steamer had to stop at Villa to take passengers and mail to Naples, but again the Reggio demanded that the steamer stop in Reggio, as the provincial capital. In those years the Prince Francesco Ruffo, brother of Cardinal Fabrizio Ruffo and last Lord of Fiumara di Muro and nearby Motte, who had at that time a bitter civil dispute with the City of Villa due to some land Aspromonte from the feudal patrimony of Ruffo, called Forest d'Aspromonte, which had been assigned to the municipality of Villese; but without any feeling of revenge, established in 1823, also teaching at Villa twice a week the nautical master of Pietro Barbaro being Villa, Pezzo, Cannitello seaside resorts. In fact, at that time there were, only in the Villa, 323 sailors and 36 boats. It was a major breakthrough for the Villese Navy, which had so many young people educated in the difficult art of sailing. Between 1823 and 1825 the National Road (present-day State Route 18) was opened, while in 1830 the Fontana Vecchia was completed, the primary source of water in masonry placed at the service of the town, which today remains the oldest building existing in the city.

On August 31, 1847, there was an attempt to bike renaissance in Villa Campo Calabro, Rosalì and Calanna. The initiative, fueled mainly by the Carbonari Villesi, which also participated in the young Rocco Larussa, who later became famous sculptor, failed due to the timely intervention of Intendant of Reggio, General Rocco Zerbi. On September 4, Reggio reinforcements were sent from the batteries to Pezzo, the attempted revolt was put down and the revolutionaries arrested. A Piece Villa and many were the Carbonari and many attempts were made to revolutionary insurrections in those years, as in all of Italy. All were harshly repressed by the Bourbons and there were several arrests and sentencing to life imprisonment, even against Rocco Larussa, together with his brothers Joseph and Ignatius.

The heights between Piale and Cannitello were the scene of the clash between the troops of Garibaldi and the Bourbon generals Melendez and Briganti 23 August 1860 in those same days he landed on the beach in Santa Trada Porticello and a contingent of 200 partisans.

After the Unification of Italy, the area, a strategic spot for the defense of the Straits, became a focal point in the national system of coastal defense with the construction of the Fort Beleño of Piale in 1888 or so, to make way for what was demolished Tower of Piraino, with the adjoining fort Murat. This happened after the project of fortifications of the Italian Government for the defense of the national territory, which began in the 1870s and 1880s.

==== The Spinning Mills and Industrial Development ====
Between the end of the eighteenth and the first half of the twentieth century Villa San Giovanni was particularly famous for the breeding of silkworms and its mills, of which now only a few ruins remain of the 56 that operated in ancient times. They constituted an important source of employment and livelihood for the population. The silk textile business was started in the last fifteen years of the eighteenth century through the work of Rocco Antonio Caracciolo, who already in 1792 had made operational a textile mill and a spinning house, the first located between the palace and the current Caracciolo Fontana, the second at the road Mycenae (now Via Mycenae), near today's Salesian shelter. The growth of textiles was also due to the Turin born Francesco Bal, director of spinning in the Reggio region and the large spinning mill at Santa Caterina. Soon many villagers followed the example of Caracciolo and numerous mills were built between Villa, Pezzo and Cannitello. The industrial activity had also grown the population: in fact, Fossa in 1777, recorded only 236 souls, while in 1811 the inhabitants numbered 1804, in 1849 grew to 3475, and in 1901 the population was 6647.

In 1847 there were 44 mills in Villa, 676 ironers, 676 teachers and 676 disciples. But soon came the mechanization and with it, after the unification of Italy, the northern and foreign investments of entrepreneurs, such as Milan Adriano Grass and the English Thomas Hallam and his nephew Edward J. Eaton, who parted company with activities in Villesi spinners. The town then earned the nickname of small Manchester, in reference to the silky English city of Manchester and the British industrial presence. In 1892, Villa operated twenty-boiler systems and one system with direct heat (Bambara Pasquale). The major mills in the boiler were spinning mill Eaton (3 boilers, 35 horses, 128 containers and 300 employees), the spinning mill Grass (3 boilers, 42 horses, 110 containers and 253 employees), the spinning mill Florio and Marra (2 boilers, 14 horses, 120 containers and 238 employees), the spinning mill and sons John Caminiti (2 boilers, 16 horses, 56 bowls and 136 employees) and the spinning mill Lofaro Rocco and children (2 boilers, 12 horses, 60 bowls and 106 employees). Here are two other systems with two boilers (Aricò Salvatore Sergi and Cosimo) and thirteen to one boiler operated by various contractors Villesi. On March 19, 1877, was established the Workers' Mutual Aid Society, which still exists and operates.

==== The pipe industry ====
Villa was also famous for the pipe industry. From 1913, a French factory was set up in the Villa for the production of pipes, the Vassas, located in the premises of the former Erba spinning mill, along the current Via Marina. Around 1926 it was sold to the Tuscan Egidio Dei, former director of the same; then was equipped with about 25 circular saws. Here, heather briar pipes were produced and refined. The products of the factory went into final processing in northern Italy (especially Milan), France, England, Germany and the United States. At its peak the Dei factory gave employment to about fifty workers, as well as the lumberjacks and truck drivers who transported the wood, which came mainly from Aspromonte, but also from Sicily, Sardinia and Greece. The factory was active until the early eighties, when it was forced to close due to decreased demand and increased production requirements. In the same period, another pipe factory was opened in Villa, the Tripepi factory, located near the Via Fontana Vecchia, this also disappearing at the beginning of the early eighties.

==== The construction of the railway line and the beginning of a steam ferry ====
In 1884 the stations were inaugurated Villa and Cannitello, along with the stretch of railroad that joined with Reggio Calabria. In the early years of the twentieth century, completed the construction of the port and began racing modern ferry boats to steam for Messina. In fact, Villa was increasingly preferred as the main point in Reggio ferry to Sicily, being much closer to the city than the capital of Messina. On 1 March 1905 the station Villa was connected to the airport of ferry boats with a railway junction, thus laying the foundations for the ferry service railway rolling stock. The importance of Villa San Giovanni gradually increased to the detriment of Reggio Calabria, as the Tyrrhenian railway route, which is shorter than the Ionic, led to the displacement of the rail traffic by sea on Villesi cradles, which were increased and strengthened.

==== Contemporary Age ====
At the beginning of the 20th century, the city was described as an industrious and avant-garde town, so that already in 1906 the city streets were illuminated by electrical street lamps.

===== The 1908 earthquake and the reconstruction =====
The area of Villa had already been affected by seismic events since the last decade of the nineteenth century. On 16 November 1894 there was a first earthquake, with no casualties, that damaged most of the buildings, so that Villa became one of the countries affected by earthquakes and was able to take advantage of the law nº535 8 August 1895.

In the following two decades, there were three other earthquakes, the earthquakes of 8 September 1905 and 23 October 1907, but the real disaster was the earthquake of December 28, 1908, an event that devastated the entire area of the Strait, the city of Reggio and Messina, and that made many victims of villagers.

Villa counted 367 deaths out of 4,325 inhabitants, 8% of the population; Acciarello, 299 of 2,125 (14% of the population); in Piece, 32 of 552 (5%). In total, 698 deaths in the town of Villa San Giovanni of a population of about 7,000 (according to the data of the census of 1901).

There were then more than 500 injured. Economic losses were incalculable: the whole town was destroyed, together with the port with its new infrastructure, the station and the rail, and most of the mills, while others were severely damaged; all the churches and public buildings collapsed. The district that was the most devastated was the Immaculate Conception. There were very few buildings that resisted the earthquake.

Reconstruction began the following year and definitively ended only in the early fifties, with significant changes in the urban setting of Villa. The first buildings to be rebuilt as early as 1909 were in fact the mills to enable resumption of industrial activity and provide employment in the area devastated by the earthquake. The tenements, churches and other public buildings were housed in inferior buildings, pending the completion of the new works. In the early thirties the city center was largely rebuilt, as evidenced by the Municipal Palace (Palazzo San Giovanni), the Central Elementary School, the Church of the Immaculate Conception and the many private buildings dating back to the late twenties. Subsequent buildings were influenced by fascist architecture, as evidenced, for example, by the austere geometric shapes of the building of the railway station designed by Roberto Narducci. The project of the Great Reggio

Vintage photo of the historic Via Garibaldi

==== The Grand Reggio project ====
In 1927 the municipality of Villa San Giovanni, together with Cannitello and other municipalities in the district for a total of fourteen, was conurbated to the municipality of Reggio Calabria following the Grande Reggio project, aimed, according to the promoters, at creating a single Calabrian town area on the shore of the Strait of Messina.

But the hardships for the Villese population were notable, as the centralization of the municipal offices in the capital involved additional work (then burdensome and lengthy) for the simplest administrative acts. In addition, the loss of administrative autonomy would have made the Villa identity vanish, reduced to a mere district of Grande Reggio. So grievances, in the Fascist regime, were not lacking: one of the biggest supporters of the autonomy of the town was Don Luigi Nostro, who sent in writing to Mussolini, "The end of a municipality", or rather a mandate of ten municipalities supported petitions of the Villesi against the maxi-municipality. The government, by decree of January 26, 1933, restored self-government to Villa San Giovanni, including from that date the territory of Cannitello (up to 1947 and also Campo Calabro and Fiumara).

=== The first post-war period ===
Additional reconstructions were necessary after the Second World War, since the summer of 1943, Villa, a railway junction of national importance, had been heavily bombed by the allied forces. Almost all the ferry-boats had been sunk, with only the Messina having been saved. The first free elections, after fascism, took place in Villa, 10 March 1946. They faced two boards: the first, under the symbol of the cross and shield, picked up the Christian Democratic parties of the center and also many of the independents; the second list, which was a symbol for an ear of corn, was formed on the left. The centrist list won by a large majority, mainly because of the fear, widespread in those years in Italy, that a leftist victory would bring the country into the orbit of the Soviet Union. Natale Sciarrone became mayor remaining in office continuously for fourteen years, until 1960.

The year 1946-1947 recorded a historic event for Villa: That season, the Villese city football team participated for the first and only time in the series C championship. The experience of the neroverde team in the third series only lasted for that season, due to corporate and financial problems.

=== Demands for autonomy ===
In 1947 the City Council had to rule on the administrative autonomy of the centers of Campo Calabro, Fiumara and Cannitello, annexed to the city in 1933 following the separation of Villa from Grande Reggio. Mayor Sciarrone made a report to the council on the problem, introducing it, historically, with the thesis on the Reggina Column formulated by the Villese historian Don Luigi Nostro, to show that Campo and Fiumara, having never been part of the Villese territory, could become autonomous, but that since ancient times of Colonna Reggina, Cannitello constituted only one area with Villa. He added that the population of those centers was then: Villa 7089 inhabitants, Cannitello 2646, Campo 2958 and Fiumara 2241. The council voted on 12 February and passed the autonomy of Campo and Fiumara with 16, yes and 2, no. But many Cannitellesi were unhappy, since autonomy had not been granted to Cannitello as well; so in April the signatures of 675 citizens were gathered, asking for recognition of their municipality. The Council voted on 22 November, and the demands of the Cannitellesi were rejected with 12 votes against and only 3 in favor.

In 1955 again the citizens of Cannitello advanced proposals for the autonomy of their municipality; the question was discussed in the City Council on 29 May of that year, but this time Mayor Sciarrone proved to be strongly opposed, stating:

"Cannitello is a natural continuation of Villa San Giovanni and we can not change what nature has created on this shore for that pettiness of passions that obscure the clear vision of the things that are imposed on our eyes."

The council vote also gave a negative result this time: 15 against and only 7 in favor.

==== The fifties and sixties ====
Between the late forties and early fifties brought out many public works, including the completion of Piazza Duomo, the four-storey building to house the State Railways, a subsidiary of the aqueduct and Bolano the housing of the INA. Another important work of social housing was the village of UNRRA piece, consists of eight buildings, for a total of 32 lodgings, built with international aid grown on the organization of the United Nations. They were renovated basements plexus of elementary school, which will house the middle school, as the old premises were uninhabitable. The same middle school became independent in 1953 and in 1957 consisted of 12 classes, while in 1963 there were already 230 pupils, plus another 230 for about vocational training.

Among the fifties and sixties was particularly busy city life. There were many sports associations (such as the US Villese sovracitata football club and Sporting Club Villese) and the cultural and recreational associations, such as the circle Cenide. Really important were the old Caminiti Cinema, Cinema Mignon and the Lido Cenide, then one of the most important beaches of the Strait, one of the main meeting points of the company Villese, able to attract nationally renowned artists such as Little Tony. The Lido, created in 1955 and located at the existing piers of Caronte & Tourist, ceased its activities in the mid-sixties just because of the interest associated with the new ferries of the private ferry. The property, which has remained for years in conditions of neglect, has been finally demolished in November 2011 to make way for new port facilities.

On 20 March 1966 he visited Villa San Giovanni Giuseppe Saragat the President of the Republic.

==== New industrial complexes ====
In 1952, the ISA factory began its activities, with the production of components for chairs, to which was later added the production of doors. Initially there were 120 employees. The factory was located in a large complex situated in Piazza Immacolata. Between 1967 and 1968, a strong production crisis forced the factory to close. The building was abandoned for several decades, until it was purchased in 2003 by the City of Villa, which earmarked the area for a multi-purpose center. In the early months of 2008 the demolition of the old complex began followed by the work for the construction of the new center. On 21 March 1964, the Prefect of Reggio authorized Francesco Spatolisano, the legal representative of the Aspromonte Beer SpA company, to start industrial production at land between Piale and Cannitello, but the project declined and was not completed. In 1969, with government funding for ECER at 335 million lire, the FIAT branch was opened, operating until the end of the nineties. Since 2003, following a long renovation, the building has housed a shopping mall.

==== The advent of private ferry companies ====
The n / t Zancle of Caronte & Tourist with lighthouse of Punta Pezzo "The transition from monopoly to competition, if brought some economic benefit to the city of the Strait in terms of employment, certainly created big problems for citizenship. Keeping within the city limits of the landing wheel, it was not possible to make those structures necessary to ensure that you drew benefit of traffic and you do not would suffer the damage caused by one step. The quality of life he was greatly compromised in the sense that if the State Railways had maintained a monopoly on the transportation, Certainly you would have had the deconcentration of berths rafts (note, naval units destined for the ferrying of vehicles). Not only that, but also the occupation would have benefited, since the staff employed on ships FS is higher than that of private companies, non-public company pursuing the maximization of profits, but reconciling the social value of transport between the two banks with the profitability of the traffic. » (James Iapichino, Between Scylla and Charybdis)

Soon the presence in the town center led to the boarding private Villa passage of a huge number of cars coming from the highway, through the streets, causing traffic congestion and urban air pollution levels to rise to levels of concern. For years, to try to remedy these problems, it was suggested to move the boarding of private companies into a new home south of downtown Villa, directly connected to the junction of the A3, thus avoiding traffic jams and pollution caused by the passage of wheeled vehicles.

=== The last decades ===
Since the seventies Villa San Giovanni has experienced rapid population growth, mainly due to a phenomenon of internal emigration that has led many residents of the neighboring municipalities to move to Villa, mainly for business reasons. As a result of the rapid increase in residents, the last few decades, especially since the early 1980s, have seen an expansion of the urban center and a growth in buildings never seen before, particularly in the area of Pezzo and along the coast, where vast areas previously entirely covered with greenery are now occupied by recent private housing and commercial buildings.

Villa has gone through one of the most difficult periods of its history between 1985 and 1991, a period in which a violent feud between the families of 'Ndrangheta has bloodied the Reggio, involving also the small town of the Strait and reaping many victims in the Villese citizenship, among which is the deputy mayor of the city, Giovanni Trecroci, murdered on 11 February 1990. On 9 August 1991 the Deputy Prosecutor General to the Supreme Court of Cassation, Antonino Scopelliti, was assassinated by 'Ndrangheta on behalf of the Sicilian Mafia. The feud of 'Ndrangheta ended in 1991 and since then no violent acts of this nature have occurred at Villa.

Villa continues to portray itself as a town that is constantly growing, with a notable rise in the number of foreign-born residents during the past ten years.

== Transport ==
Ferry services link Villa San Giovanni and Messina, including a train ferry departing from the main railway station. The town is also served by the A2 motorway Salerno-Reggio Calabria. Now 80% of vehicles that need to go in Sicily pass by here.

The planned Strait of Messina Bridge will connect Villa San Giovanni and Torre Faro when it opens in 2033 and it will become the longest suspension bridge in the world.

== Photogallery ==
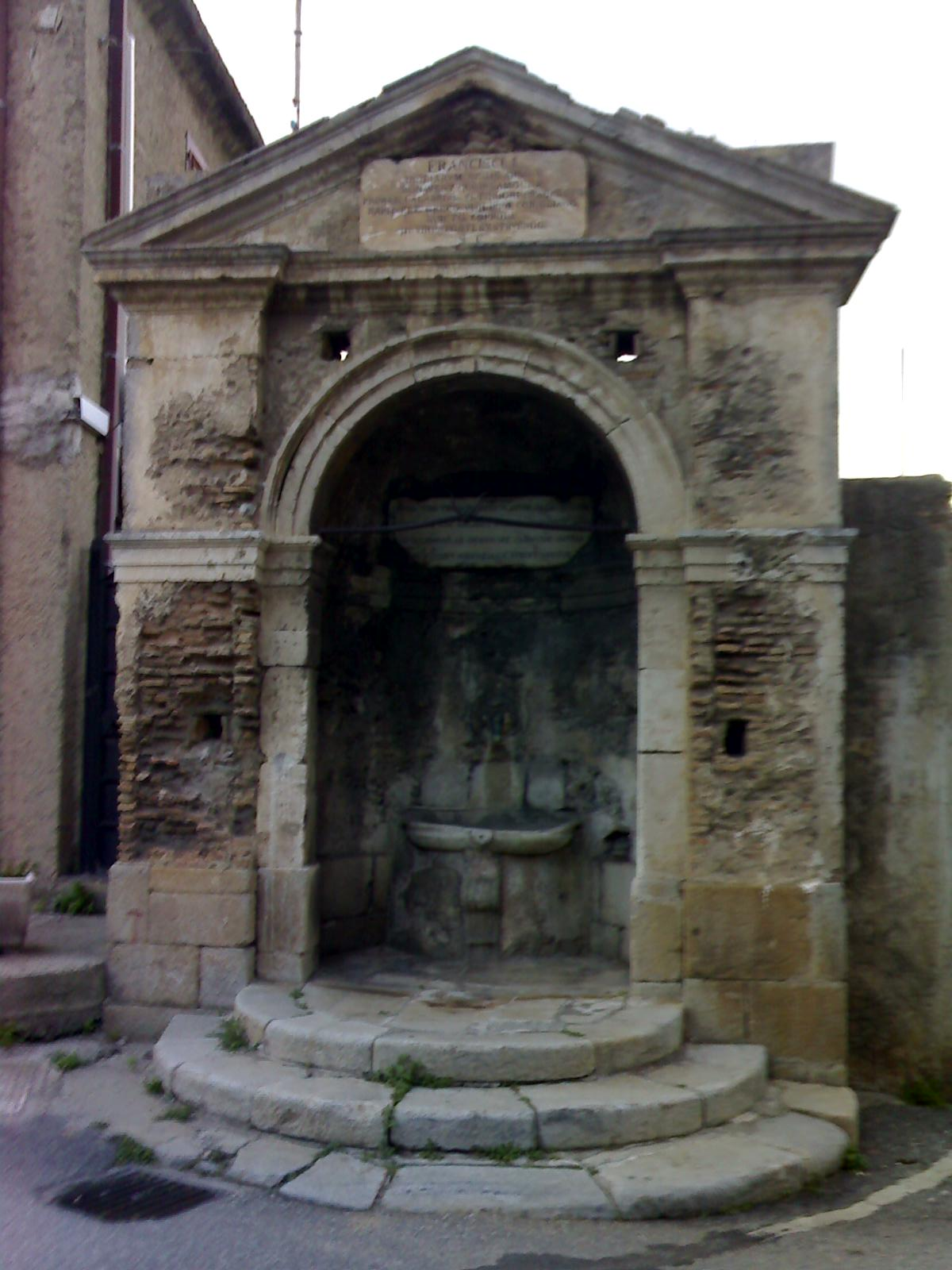
The Old Fountain of Villa San Giovanni

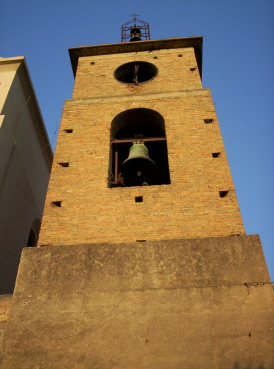
The belltower of the church of San Cosma e Damiano in Villa San Giovanni

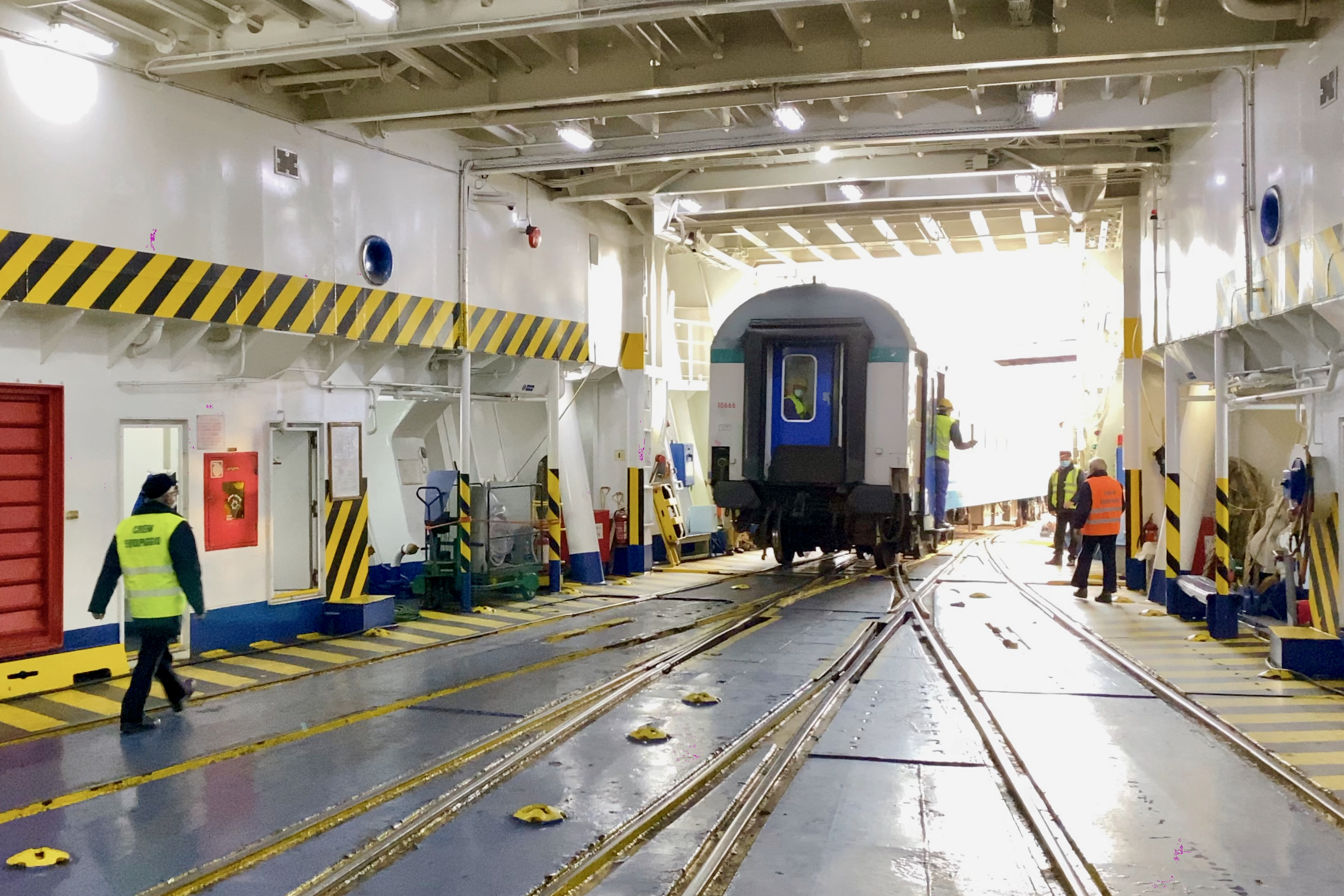
Interior of a roll-on roll-off train ferry in Villa San Giovanni, Italy

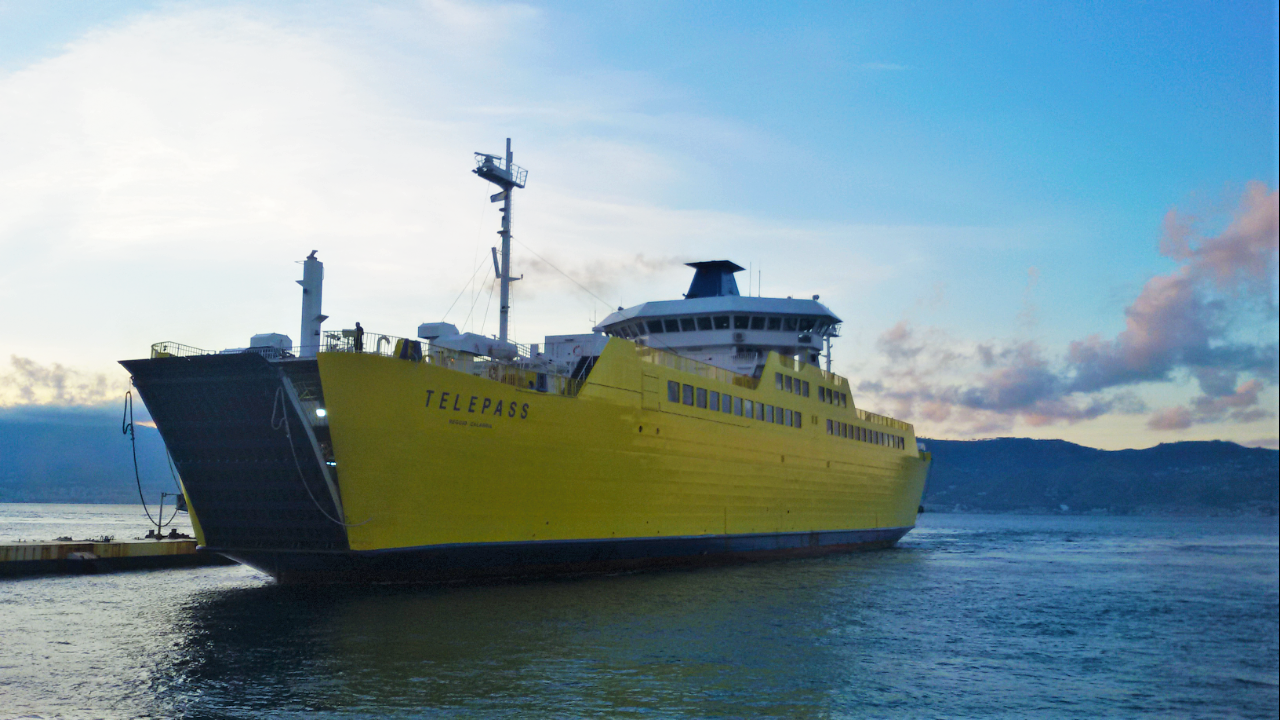
the ferry "Telepass" of the company Caronte and Tourist at Villa San Giovanni

== Sport ==
Villa has a long tradition in the swimming disciplines with various sports clubs active in swimming (even at a competitive level) and scuba diving. Every summer, in August, the Strait Crossing takes place in the waters of the Strait of Messina, an international level swimming competition with the participation of dozens of athletes from all over Italy and abroad. The journey begins at Cape Pelorus, the extreme limit of the channel on the shore of Sicily, and ends at the beach of Pezzo:athletes then crossing a stretch of sea of more than 3 km long.
