= Antonio Imerti =

Member of the 'Ndrangheta

- Born: August 22, 1946 (age 80); Villa San Giovanni, Calabria, Italy
- Other name: "Nano feroce" (Fierce dwarf)
- Spouse: Giuseppina Condello
- Status: Released under supervision
- Allegiance: Imerti 'ndrina / 'Ndrangheta

Antonio Imerti (Italian pronunciation: [anˈtɔːnjo iˈmɛrti]; born on 22 August 1946, in Villa San Giovanni), also known as Nano feroce ("fierce dwarf"), is an Italian criminal and a member of the 'Ndrangheta, a Mafia-type criminal organisation in Calabria. He was born in Villa San Giovanni and controlled the Fiumara di Muro neighbourhood in Reggio Calabria.

== Life as a fugitive ==
He was one of the protagonists in the Second 'Ndrangheta war which raged from 1985 to 1991 between the Condello-Imerti clan and the De Stefano-Tegano clan, which left 621 deaths. His marriage in 1983 with Giuseppina Condello – the sister of the Condello brothers, underbosses of Paolo De Stefano – triggered the conflict. The De Stefano clan feared the new alliance might challenge their power base. The conflict exploded in 1985, two years after the marriage and saw practically all the 'ndrine in the city of Reggio Calabria grouped into either one of two opposing factions.

The war started with a failed bomb attack on Antonio Imerti on 11 October 1985, which left three of his bodyguards dead. Two days later, his rival Paolo De Stefano was killed and suspicion fell on Imerti as the one who ordered the killing.

== Disappearance and capture ==
Imerti escaped a second bomb attack on 7 July 1986, and subsequently became a fugitive. He was arrested on 23 March 1993, in Reggio Calabria, together with his brother-in-law Pasquale Condello. Newspaper reports mentioned that Condello might have surpassed his former boss – and there had been speculation that Condello might have killed Imerti when they both were still fugitives. However, although the speculation proved to be false, Imerti's power had declined because of his opposition to a 'pax mafiosa' to end the war between the opposing clans in Reggio Calabria.

Imerti was released from prison on 28 July 2021, after 28 years, and placed under supervised release.
