= Carlo Taormina =

Italian lawyer and politician (born 1940)

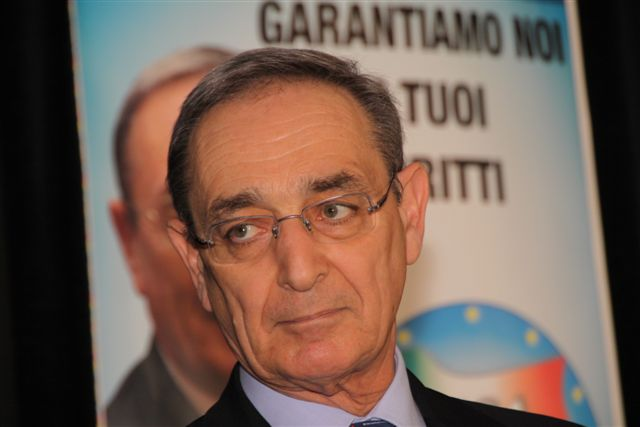

Undersecretary of State of the Ministry of the Interior
- In office 11 June 2001 – 5 December 2001
- Preceded by: Gian Franco Schietroma
- Succeeded by: Gianpiero D'Alia

Member of the Chamber of Deputies
- In office 30 May 2001 – 27 April 2006
- Constituency: Lombardy 1 – Melzo

Personal details
- Born: 16 December 1940 (age 85) Rome, Italy
- Party: Free Italy (since 2020); SCN (since 2022)
- Other political affiliations: Forza Italia (1996–2007); Italy League (2008–2011); The Autonomy (2009); M5S (2016–2019)
- Height: 1.70 m (5 ft 7 in)
- Spouse: Celestina Del Signore
- Occupation: Lawyer, university professor

Carlo Taormina (born 16 December 1940) is an Italian lawyer, politician, jurist, and academic who was the defence lawyer of some of the most controversial trials in modern Italian history, such as that of the Ustica affair, the Nazi Erich Priebke, the Abu Omar case, and the Cogne case. He entered politics in 1996, joining Forza Italia, the political party of Silvio Berlusconi. That same year, he ran for the Chamber of Deputies but was not elected.

Taormina was elected a deputy in 2001 but was not included among the candidates for re-election in 2006, after which he left politics. Taormina was Deputy Group Leader of Forza Italia in the Chamber of Deputies, and was briefly undersecretary of state of the Ministry of the Interior; he had to resign due to defending some mafia defendants. He also extended the law of legitimate suspicion, one of the many Berlusconi's ad personam laws, and headed several parliamentary commissions, such as the inquiry into the death of Ilaria Alpi and Miran Hrovatin. In 2009 and 2010, he was the unsuccessful candidate for The Autonomy and Italy League to the European Parliament and the Regional Council of Lazio, respectively.

After the end of his full-time political career in 2006, Taormina became one of the main commentators for the Italian sports talk programme Il processo di Biscardi. In 2008, he founded his own movement, Italy League, which ended in 2011. That same year, he became an independent politician close to Lega Nord, and since 2014 was close to the Five Star Movement (M5S), which he joined in 2016. After leaving the M5S in 2019, he founded Free Italy with New Force and former M5S militants in 2020. In 2022, he also joined South calls North, and was the party's unsuccessful candidate for that year's general election.

In addition to the individuals that he defended as a lawyer, such as a Nazi and former SS captain, mafia defendants, and neo-fascist leaders, Taormina attracted criticism and controversy during his long career, including for his comments about gay people. In 2014, he was convicted of discrimination on the job of homosexual individuals; the sentence was upheld in 2015 and 2020.

== Early life and career ==
Born in Rome on 16 December 1940, Taormina graduated in Law from La Sapienza public research university, becoming at first a lawyer and at a later time a magistrate. During his academic career, Taormina dedicated himself to teaching. In 1975, he became a professor of Procedural Law at the University of Macerata; as of 2012, he still taught Procedural Law at the University of Rome Tor Vergata. His teaching method was influenced mainly by Alfredo De Marsico, Giuseppe Sabatini, and Giovanni Conso. Taormina also wrote a series of pamphlets and research papers, which mainly focus on the relationship between the accusers and the accused. Some of his most famous scripts were a manual on procedural law and several monographs. Moreover, he wrote and held the role of co-director for the journal Il Foro Italiano, which was founded in 1972. Also in 1975, Taormina became the editorial director for the specialistic magazine La Giustizia Penale.

== Lawyer career ==
During his lawyer career, Taormina worked on many famous cases, including among others the Itavia Flight 870 accident, where he defended the officials accused of hiding valuable information that could have defined the causes of the incident; the Ardeatine massacre, where he defended ex-SS captain Erich Priebke, alongside Velio Di Rezze and Paolo Giachini, on the grounds that Priebke "obeyed an order he considered legitimate and for this reason after many years he did not regret it, but considered the fact as a horror"; the murder of Marta Russo, where he lodged a complaint against the magistrates and investigators, without having any connection with the defence of the accused Giovanni Scattone, Salvatore Ferraro, and Francesco Liparota; the Cogne case, where he substituted professor Carlo Federico Grosso in the defence of Annamaria Franzoni, (Note: Within two weeks, Taormina was successful in his appeal for Franzoni's release due to lack of sufficient evidence, before the prosecution successfully appealed to the Supreme Court of Cassation.) and was subsequently substituted by lawyer Paola Savio; the killing of SISMI agent Nicola Calipari in Baghdad, where he presided as the defender of Gianluca Preite; and the murder of Yara Gambirasio, where he took part to the criminal trial as a private citizen, arguing for a re-examination of the DNA found on the crime scene to grant Massimo Giuseppe Bossetti, at the time facing life in prison, a revision of his trial and conviction. In 2004, he said: "After Anna Maria Franzoni, I will deal with Saddam Hussein. His sister called me from Jordan." In 2021, he said that he still believed Fronzoni was innocent.

Taormina was the private lawyer for some of the accused for Tangentopoli, such as Bettino Craxi, Giulio Andreotti, and Vincenzo Muccioli, and accused the Mani pulite judges of being justicialists rather than garantists. He also defended the Sacra Corona Unita boss Francesco Prudentino, and was the lawyer of Franco Freda, a neo-fascist, in the court case for the disbandment of the far-right political party National Front. He was the plaintiff lawyer for the parents of the children from Rignano Flaminio, who were suspected of pedophilia and were acquitted. Moreover, he defended Mario Placanica, a Carabiniere accused of the murder of Carlo Giuliani during the Group of Eight meetings in Genoa in 2001; he was one of the lawyers of Nicola Di Girolamo during his trial for criminal conspiracy aimed at money laundering on an international level and the infraction of the electoral law with the mafia association aggravation in 2010, which ended with a plea bargain; and he defended Franco Fiorito, who was implicated in a peculation scandal involving the Regional Council of Lazio headed by Renata Polverini in September 2012, and was initially arrested as a result, before Taormina successfully appealed for his release in December 2012.

Following his involvement in the Cogne case, Taormina filed a complaint against Luciano Garofano, then commander of the Carabinieri's Reparto Investigazioni Scientifiche (RIS) in Parma who was involved in several high-profile criminal investigations, including the Cogne case and the Garlasco case. The investigation, which concerned approximately forty consultancies carried out between 2002 and 2009, examined allegations of embezzlement, fraud, and making false statements in public documents. According to the allegations, Garofano had used Carabinieri personnel and facilities during working hours while receiving professional fees for consultancy work. Garofano denied any wrongdoing, stating that the consultancies had been authorised and that payments had been made in accordance with the applicable rules. The investigation was subsequently closed without resulting in charges against Garofano.

Taormina was the lawyer of Roberto Fiore and Giuliano Castellino, leaders of New Force. Ex-Nuclei Armati Rivoluzionari member Luigi Aronica, Biagio Passaro (leader of the IoApro movement), and Pamela Testa were arrested for the assault on the CGIL headquarters during the No Green Pass demonstration on 9 October 2021. He said: "I am a lawyer, I have defended mafiosi, corrupt white collar workers. Mine is a profession." In 2023, Fiore, Castellino, and Testa were all sentenced to more than 8 years in prison. Also in 2023, he defended the lawyer Alessandra Demichelis, who had been suspended for 15 months by the district disciplinary council of the Order of the Lawyers due to the pics she published on Instagram. Taormina said that "the private sphere is sacred" and commented that "Cicciolina was a member of Parliament, and outside she was a pornstar; Berlusconi was Prime Minister and went bunga bunga in the evening." (Note: Taormina described the ethical rules of the bar association as "antiquated and obscurantist, a thousand miles away from social networks and the Republican Constitution", and told Corriere della Sera that "the provision of the district disciplinary council makes a generic standardized reasoning, without saying why it leads to 15 months of suspension." According to Taormina, there should be a clear line between professional activity and private life, and the rules must be review "in the world governed by social media". As for the pics considered inadequate, he said: "But doesn't anyone grasp the satirical and ironic effect of certain photos? What if I want to joke or do burlesque in the evening? Are we kidding? We can discuss taste, not principles." He further commented: "To tell you how things are going: in Rome, a lawyer had clients pay him in cocaine, got a censure, and ten days later I found him in a courtroom. Another, arrested, two months suspended.")

Taormina defended Cateno De Luca in a 2023 defamation trial, arguing after the first-instance trial, which sentenced him to 8 months, that it presented "an extraordinary anomaly"; however, the sentence on appeal was changed to a suspended fine and damage claims were excluded in June 2025, and Italy's Supreme Court of Cassation annulled the conviction in March 2026 and remanded the case to a new appeal trial in Reggio Calabria. In July 2026, both Taormina and De Luca issued a statement arguing that the sentence had ruled that "he exercised the right to criticize an objective judicial persecution and by publicizing facts, even personal ones, of Mr. Barbaro, but real and proven." (Note: For the press release, see De Luca, Cateno (10 July 2026). "La Corte Suprema di Cassazione annulla le condanne pronunciate nei confronti di Cateno De Luca" (Press release) – via Facebook.) De Luca, who personally thanked Taormina, commented that he did not want to appeal his conviction but was convinced to do so by Taormina. (Note: For De Luca's statements, see De Luca, Cateno [@catenodeluca]; (24 June 2025). "De Luca, svolta in appello: revocata la condanna a otto mesi, resta solo una multa sospesa!" – via Instagram.) Previously, Taormina had defended De Luca in a tax evasion case (originally also involving criminal conspiracy charges before this part of the prosecution case was dismissed by the preliminary hearing judge in July 2018), claiming in November 2017 that there was a conspiracy against his client. De Luca was ultimately acquitted in January 2022 and Taormina described De Luca as the victim of a "judicial ordeal that led him to prison several times and which always resulted in the exclusion of any responsibility". In July 2025, De Luca was awarded €1,532,83 for 13 days of unjust detention, (Note: For further context, see: Annibali, Riccardo (10 January 2022). "Cateno De Luca accusato di evasione e poi assolto: 12 anni di 'tritacarne' per il sindaco di Messina". Il Riformista (in Italian).; "Ingiusta detenzione Cateno De Luca, assolto e risarcito". Errori Giudiziari (in Italian). 13 August 2025.) and Taormina said that the award of damage claims to De Luca was a "veritable indictment" of the prosecution.

Into the 2020s, Taormina continued to be invited on TV shows to explain law and the Italian legal system, such as the plea bargain, and as a pundit on judicial cases where he is not involved as lawyer, such as the Garlasco case, (Note: The Garlasco case refers to the 13 August 2007 murder of 26-year-old Chiara Poggi, who was bludgeoned to death inside her family home in Garlasco, Pavia. The case, which saw the conviction of Poggi's boyfriend Alberto Stasi (after being acquitted twice) following a long and controversial judicial history in 2015, became one of Italy's most controversial cases and among the most heavily covered media trials, in large part due to its complex forensic battles. Unlike commentators who argued in favour of Stasi's innocence, Taormina expressed his view that Stasi was guilty but that the original investigation failed to establish the true context of the crime. Taormina labeled the genesis of the Garlasco investigation as "flawed". Commenting on judicial developments in June 2026, including trial review requests sought by Stasi's legal team and the decision to put Stasi under the care of social services after he served around 11 years of his 16-year sentence, Taormina argued that authorities should have immediately initiated a full top-tier global technical review rather than keeping Stasi under alternative probationary sentencing. As the case was re-opened in 2025 with the investigation of Andrea Sempio as an accomplice of Stasi, Taormina maintained that Stasi remained the true culprit but that he killed Poggi after discovering a secret relationship between Poggi and Sempio, and that Sempio was about to be arrested. He publicly characterized Stasi as a "lucid killer" and asserted that Sempio represented the hidden motive behind the murder. According to Taormina's reconstruction, Sempio was physically present at the scene of the crime alongside Stasi, although he said that Sempio himself did not commit the murder. After the Pavia Public Prosecution's Office found evidence of Stasi's innocence and Sempio's charge was changed from accomplice to that of aggravated murder, based on the discovery of DNA evidence and Sempio's known familiarity with the Poggi household, Taormina repeatedly used public platforms to urge Sempio to come forward to prosecutors and clarify his role, asserting that the complete truth about what happened inside the house had yet to emerge. In May 2026, Taormina outlined four potential legal outcomes for the case: both Stasi and Sempio could be either acquitted or convicted (the latter of which would be without precedent, resulting in two people convicted for the same murder), or alternatively one could be convicted while the other is acquitted. In July 2026, Taormina wrote: "It seems to me that two things are certain even for the Stasi clan: Stasi stepped on Chiara's blood which however would have been dried but was not when the police arrived; Sempio has never seen films of the Stasi–Poggi relationship which would have been the cause of the homicidal obsession. So?" See Taormina, Carlo [@carlo_taormina] (24 July 2026). "Mi pare che due cose siano certe anche per il clan Stasi:Stasi calpestò il sangue di Chiara che però sarebbe stato secco ma non lo era quando giunsero i carabinieri;Sempio non ha mai visto film dei rapporti Stasi-Poggi che sarebbero stati causa della ossessione omicida.Allora?" (Tweet) (in Italian) – via X (formerly Twitter).) the Roggero case, (Note: Taormina said that the Supreme Court of Cassation's decision in July 2026 to upheld the conviction of Mario Roggero, a jeweler who murdered two robbers and attempted to murder the third one on 28 April 2021 and claimed self-defence, was correct in its ruling, arguing that the case could not be considered a legitimate right of self-defence. The murders occurred when the robbers, who were armed with a knife and a gun that later turned out to be a toy gun, had left the jewelry store and were in the process of leaving with the car used for the getaway. Roggero, who in 2007 had pleaded guilty before the Court of Alba to a two-month sentence (subsequently replaced with a €2,280 fine) for insults and threats aggravated by the use of a weapon in 2005, shot the robbers in the car, chased them into the street outside the jewelry store, and shot them in the back as they fled, killing two and seriously wounding a third; his chase culminated when he reached the bedside of one of the robbers lying on the ground and repeatedly kicked him in the head. As a result, his actions were seen as revenge rather than self-defence. Moreover, Taormina defended the request of damage claims against Roggero for the two deaths on the grounds that Roggero was convicted of two counts of murder, one count of attempted murder, and one count of unlawful carrying of a weapon, observing: "How can we exclude compensation for damages to those who have suffered them, even if they committed a crime, without violating the Constitution? It will be a matter of compensating those who also contributed to causing the damage. And perhaps exclude the damages, but let's not touch the principles." For further context, see: "Caso Roggero: perché la Cassazione ha confermato la condanna". Il Fatto Quotidiano (in Italian). 15 July 2026.; "Roggero e la pistola nel 2005: il precedente che ha pesato in sentenza". Il Fatto Quotidiano (in Italian). 17 July 2026.; Taormina, Carlo [@carlo_taormina] (17 July 2026). "Come si fa ad escludere senza violare la Costituzione il risarcimento danno a colui che li ha subiti,anche commettendo un crimine ? Si tratterà di risarcire tenendo conto che anche lui ha contribuito a produrre il danno.E magari escludere il danno,ma non tocchiamo i principii" (Tweet) (in Italian) – via X (formerly Twitter).; "Tutto quello che c'è da sapere sulla sentenza Roggero". Pagella Politica (in Italian). 20 July 2026.; Motta, Lucio (24 July 2026). "Legittima difesa: il caso Roggero". Filodiritto (in Italian).) and the Fakir case. (Note: The Fakir case refers to the death of 42-year-old Moroccan national Abderrahim Fakir, who died on 19 July 2026 following a police restraint in the Pilastro district of Bologna. The incident triggered significant public debate regarding police restraint protocols, criminal immunity laws, and systemic accountability. On his social media, Taormina commented: "Say what you want and attack me as usual, but I cannot interpret Fakir's video as anything other than evidence of serious police responsibility. I respect the institution, but being mocked is another matter entirely." See Taormina, Carlo [@carlo_taormina] (23 July 2026). "Ditemi quello che vi pare e assalitemi come al solito,ma io non riesco ad interpretare il filmato di Fakir se non come prova di una grave responsabilità della polizia. Fermo il rispetto per l'istituzione,ma essere presi in giro e' altra cosa" (Tweet) (in Italian) – via X (formerly Twitter). He added that the smoking gun in the case was whether "the police and/or 118, had they dutifully or cautiously behaved differently, [would] have prevented Fakir's death". See Taormina, Carlo [@carlo_taormina] (24 July 2026). "La pistola fumante delle domande sul caso Fakir è la seguente:la polizia e/o il 118,tenendo doverosamente o cautelativamente un diverso comportamento diverso,avrebbero evitato la morte di Fakir?" (Tweet) (in Italian) – via X (formerly Twitter). He further wrote: "Better I stay silent. A government that wants to give license to kill even those who flee. A government that also targets young people, deeming them unnaturally accountable, that is, capable of understanding and willing like adults. A government that demands silence when Fakir's videos raise the real question of whether a man's life could have been saved with different behavior. A government like this is marching toward legal incivility. I am not left-wing and I love the police, but this cannot mean ideological blindness." See Taormina, Carlo [@taormina.carlo]; (24 July 2026). "Meglio che non parlo. Un governo che vuofle dare licenza di uccidere anche chi scappa. Un governo che se la prende anche coi ragazzini ritenendoli innaturalmente imputabili e cioè capaci di intendere e di volere come gli audulti. Un governo che vuole il silenzio quando i video di Fakir pongono il vero problema se con diversi comportamenti potesse salvarsi la vita di un uomo. Un governo così marcia verso la inciviltà giuridica. Io non sono di sinistra e amo le forze dell'ordine,ma questo non può significare cecità ideologica" – via Instagram.) As a prominent legal commentator, Taormina frequently analyzed high-profile Italian judicial matters as a guest on TV shows, such as Ignoto X on La7, Incidente Probatorio on Cusano Media, and Canale 122 – Fatti di Nera. In October 2025, Taormina was rumoured and discussed as Andrea Sempio's possible new lawyer in the re-opening of the Garlasco case as his previous lawyer Massimo Lovati was dismissed due to his controversial behaviour. Taormina refused the offer on the grounds that he thought Sempio was guilty. In July 2026, Taormina criticized a Meloni government bill introducing a rebuttable presumption of criminal liability for minors aged 14 to 18. The legislative proposal, which inverted the burden of proof by assuming a minor's capacity to understand right from wrong until proven otherwise, was described by Taormina as "worse than the Fascist Code". He argued that the state should educate and support vulnerable youth rather than repress them. (Note: On his social media, Taormina wrote: "How can you be a father, mother, or grandparent and not be horrified by the proposed presumption of criminal responsibility for minors between the ages of 14 and 18? Our young people are extremely fragile, and we're destroying them instead of educating and supporting them? Who advises you? Worse than the Fascist Code." See Taormina, Carlo [@carlo_taormina] (24 July 2026). "Come si fa ad essere padri,madri,nonni e a non inorridire di fronte alla proposta di presunzione di imputabilita' dei minori tra i 14 e i 18 anni.I nostri giovani sono fragilissimi e noi li affossiamo invece di educarli e sostenerli? Ma chi vi consiglia?Peggio del codice fascista" (Tweet) (in Italian) – via X (formerly Twitter).)

== Political career ==
=== Forza Italia and second Berlusconi government ===
Taormina began his political career in 1996, becoming a candidate for Forza Italia for the Chamber of Deputies in the college of Monte Sacro in Rome representing the Pole for Freedoms; he obtained 49.9% of the vote and was defeated for a few votes by fellow lawyer Ennio Parrelli representing The Olive Tree. During the legislature XIV of Italy (2001–2006), Taormina was a deputy representing Forza Italia, being given the role of Deputy Group Leader of the party in the Chamber of Deputies. He was elected in the district No. 29 (Melzo) of the III constituency (Lombardy 1) through a decoy list in the 2001 Italian general election. His political role was not renewed for the legislature XV of Italy (2006–2008). In regards to his political activities during these years and being Silvio Berlusconi's secretary and private lawyer, Taormina declared: "I would never do many things I did back then. I am not embarrassed to say that I experienced a moral crisis, which culminated when I saw how the Knight's [referring to Berlusconi] narrower entourage was being structured."

In 2001, Taormina was briefly undersecretary of state of the Ministry of the Interior in the second Berlusconi government. In November 2001, in a climate of significant tensions between the Italian government and the judiciary during that period, he faced calls to resign after suggesting that Milanese magistrates in the SME–Ariosto case should be imprisoned for their rulings. After six months in office, he resigned on 5 December 2001 when the press pointed to his role as deputy secretary "for matters relating to the coordination of anti-racketeering and anti-usury initiatives, and the coordination of solidarity initiatives for the victims of mafia-type crimes", which was in a conflict of interest with the exercise of legal defence in favour of various defendants for mafia events and in criminal trials in which the state had formed a civil party. In particular, the episode in which he presented himself as the legal defender of the Sacra Corona Unita boss Francesco Prudentino caused a sensation, accompanied by the escort he was entitled to as a undersecretary of state of the Ministry of the Interior.

In 2002, Taormina extended the original text on Berlusconi's ad personam law on legitimate suspicion, which at a later time was called the Cirami Law. In 2010, he recalled:

I worked for Berlusconi for years, I know his strategies. When I was his legal advisor and he asked me to write him laws that protect him from the judiciary, it made no secret of their purpose ad personam. And I wrote them even better than they do now Ghedini and Pecorella. The one on legitimate suspicion, it seems to me, was in 2002, he needed to move his trials from Milan to Rome. He asked us openly and we, faithful executors of the prince's will, began to write it. And we also did a nice job, I have to say: it seemed all right. Then one evening in late October, around 11, a call from Ciampi arrived. I told Berlusconi that with that change it would no longer be of any use. He thought about it for a while and then replied: "In the meantime, let's do it like that, then we will see." I was right: in fact the law passed with those changes and it did not help him.

When Berlusconi died in June 2023, Taormina put him alongside Italy's most famous statesmen, such as Alcide De Gasperi, Aldo Moro, Giulio Andreotti, and Bettino Craxi. About Forza Italia, Taormina stated that Berlusconi never considered it a party, and that it had a political culture where even communists had a voice and that Berlusconi never hated communists. He further stated that he did not regret the ad personam laws, saying: "They were self-defence in the face of the judges' intolerable games."

=== Parliamentary commissions and resignation ===
In 2003, Taormina was the chairman of the parliamentary commission of inquiry into the death of Ilaria Alpi and Miran Hrovatin. At that time, his involvement aroused controversy when he was accused of having used investigative powers to control the work of the other commission based at the time in Palazzo San Macuto. This commission was working on the Telekom Serbia affair, of which he was also a member. In August 2003, he said: "The time has come for Prodi, Fassino, and Dini to suffer the consequences of the most devastating corruption that has ever been consumed in the history of the Republic and the Judicial offices must also behave accordingly by arranging these characters for arrest." In September 2003, following the investigations of La Repubblica, Taormina made amends and announced his withdrawal from political life, although he remained in the Italian Parliament for the remainder of the legislature until 2006. In his resignation statement, he said:

I confess, I am the puppeteer, the puppeteer of this whole affair, I declare myself by competition in slander with Paoletti, Marini, and Pintus. [I] created difficulties for Forza Italia and Berlusconi. [It is therefore right] that I withdraw from political life. I made a serious mistake, and this is an open confession, it is right that I make public amends; I acknowledge that Repubblica is equipped with top-ranking journalists. I am making a serious announcement, I will resign as a deputy in the next few days. Through the various trials indicated by Repubblica and for my relationships with characters such as D'Andria, Fracassi, Di Bari, and also Francesco Pazienza, all connected by the collective imagination to diverted secret services and to international scams and money laundering, I managed to reach the aim to put the Telekom Serbia Commission to be subject to a poisoned meatball. I take all responsibility for characters who by calling into question Prodi, Dini, and Fassino have seriously slandered them; and I accuse myself of competition in slander, although I hope that Repubblica will do the same, because while I accuse myself I would like to know from D'Avanzo and Bonini who their puppeteers of the time were and to whom they are now serving. Repubblica is right, I cannot sue!

In January 2004, Taormina said that Alpi and Hrovatin were "on vacation in Somalia; they were not conducting any investigation: the Commission has established this." The Alpi affair and Taormina's role continued to attract controversy into the 2010s, and he made an appearance as an animated character in the 2016 animated film Somalia94 – The Ilaria Alpi Affair by Marco Giolo and published by Dynit.

=== Legislative activity ===
Taormina presented several bills as the first signatory, mainly in the legal-procedural field, including:

- Provisions for the simplification of the criminal justice system (C.2668, approved as an integrated text with others)
- Provisions regarding the prescription of the crime and the conditional suspension of the sentence (C.2709)
- Indult concession (C.3151) – rejected
- Penitentiary treatment in emergency situations (C.3313) – absorbed by the approval of the combined DDL
- Abolition of compulsory prosecution (C.3941)
- Discipline of the immunity of parliamentarians from criminal proceedings and from the execution of sentencing sentences (C.4615)
- Provisions for the reasonable length of trials and for the best protection of constitutional freedoms (C.6064)

As a co-signer, Taormina presented proposals related to different topics (euthanasia, soft drugs, prostitution, death penalty, civil unions, and same-sex marriage):

- Amendment to article 27 of the Constitution concerning the abolition of the death penalty (C.2072), to abolish the "cases foreseen by the military war laws"
- Amendments to the Consolidated Law on Narcotic Drugs on the Legalization of Cannabis Derivatives, Controlled Heroin Administration, Therapeutic Use of Marijuana (C.2973)
- Euthanasia legalization provisions (C.2974)
- Raising the minimum retirement age (C.2976)
- Reduction of terms of pre-trial detention and for the simplification of early release procedures (C.2977)
- Single-member districts and first-past-the-post reform of the electoral system of the High Council of the Judiciary (C.2978)
- Provisions relating to the establishment of the register of civil unions of same-sex couples or of different sexes and the possibility for same-sex persons to access the institution of marriage (C.2982)
- Simplification of procedures and reduction of time for obtaining a divorce (C.2983)
- Rules on medically assisted procreation and therapeutic cloning (C.2984)
- Provisions for the legalization of prostitution (C.2985)
- State presidential reform (C.3942)

=== Post-parliamentary activities ===
On 7 November 2008, Taormina founded Italy League, a movement chaired by Taormina himself, with which he ran for the presidency in the 2010 Lazio regional election and the 2016 Italian local elections. He called Italy League a "national liberation government for state reforms". In 2009, Taormina started a diatribe with Beppino Englaro (the father of Eluana Englaro, who was in a persistent vegetative state) and the magistrates of Udine in the Englaro case, announcing a premeditated murder complaint. Also in 2009, Taormina opposed the bill on the short trial, calling it "shameful, criminal, criminogenic, and ridiculous". According to Taormina, Berlusconi pressed for the approval of the short trial as a threat to raise the price and obtain the law on the legitimate impediment. This rule, which according to Taormina was "clearly unconstitutional" in that "the precondition for impediment is a charge" was explicitly temporary to allow the approval of the Lodo Alfano as a constitutional law.

In 2011, Taormina was appointed prince regent of Filettino, a municipality in the Frosinone area whose mayor, and in reaction to the decision to cut the number of comuni as part of the financial budget law of the fourth Berlusconi government, he started a secessionist movement. About the financial budget law of the Monti government in 2012, Taormina declared that he agreed with the Northern League's criticism. In an interview with the radio programme La Zanzara in 2013, Taormina replied that the greatest criminal he had defended was a former Christian Democracy member of Parliament that by then was no longer in politics. In 2017, Taormina was one of the many signers of the appeal of the newspaper Il Tempo asking for release, with postponement and suspension under penalty of health reasons, in favour of the former parliamentarian Marcello Dell'Utri, who was convicted of external complicity in mafia association and other crimes.

On 7 March 2016, Taormina announced that he had joined the Five Star Movement (M5S), which he had already supported in the 2014 European Parliament election in Italy. In a Facebook post, Taormina wrote: "After having always voted and supported M5S, yesterday I formalized my membership in the movement to make a contribution to the only political force legitimized to overthrow this Renzusconian regime [a play of word between the then Italian prime minister Matteo Renzi and Berlusconi, who had signed in 2014 the Nazareno Pact, an informal political agreement]. I will be able to do little but I will do everything for that little." He later further specified that he did not want to return to active politics and preferred to continue his career as a lawyer, supporting Beppe Grillo's movement as a private citizen. On 26 March 2016, Taormina attacked the Democratic Party deputy Diana De Marchi, saying: "De Marchi, go to ISIS to get raped a bit, do not worry, it is a sacrifice for integration. What the hell is she saying! She gets a little raped if she likes integration. Go, it is good for you... Cheat on your husband and get pregnant!" In 2017, Taormina took part to Italia a 5 Stelle, the official festival of the M5S, being contested by some activists. Following the birth of the second Conte government in 2019, Taormina left the M5S, opposing the alliance with the Democratic Party. In 2020, Taormina filed a complaint against the second Conte government for its alleged failure to apply timely prophylactic action against the COVID-19 pandemic in Italy.

On 14 December 2020, Taormina announced the birth of a new political entity, Free Italy, which was joined by New Force militants including Giuliano Castellino, some militants who had left the M5S, and exponents of No Mask and the Orange Vests of the former Carabinieri general Antonio Pappalardo. On 12 October 2021, Taormina was the lawyer for the five arrested, including the two leaders of New Force, following attacks that took place in a No Green Pass demonstration in which he was also present. Although he was vaccinated, Taormina opposed the Green Pass. In an interview to La Stampa, he defined Free Italy as "a sort of national liberation government for state reforms. And it is certainly not a left-wing organization." On 2 August 2022, Taormina announced his candidacy in Lazio for the 2022 Italian general election with South calls North, the political party of Cateno De Luca.

== Association football commentary ==
Since 2007, Taormina participates as an association football commentator on the sports broadcast Il processo di Biscardi, distinguishing himself both as a supporter of Roma and for his aversion to Juventus. (Note: Taormina is considered an antijuventino, and his aversion to Juventus was particularly evident in 2014 and 2015 when Roma fought for the scudetto. He attacked Juventus coach Antonio Conte and praised Roma coach Rudi Garcia. Although Juventus set the 102-point record in 2014 and Roma was in both occasions the runner-up 17 points behind, Taormina lamented: "Juventus is a thief, as always. The referees deserve to go to jail." After Juventus beat Roma 3–2, he further lamented: "Three thefts against two goals. From today the teams playing against Juve should stay still on the pitch. [Juventus] will win the league and the next one they will do it alone. At least they will not steal. ... I will report [the referee] Rocchi. We need to get a machine gun.") In a 2007 interview, he lamented that football was doing everything wrong. He said that the world of football is "really strange", stating in reference to the Italian Football Federation (FIGC) that it uses its private status when convenient to invoke arbitration clauses so members "cannot sue anyone without permission". He criticized the sport's reliance on an arbitration system as was done in Calciopoli, dismissing it as "absolutely laughable" and lamenting that it "practically wiped out" the original sanctions. On the other hand, Taormina criticized the Italian football institutions for what he perceive as their hypocrisy as they want to remain a "closed system" but then "demand that the police guarantee security", arguing that clubs should instead "pay for their own policing costs" without this implying state negligence. Moreover, Taormina asserted that "financial doping has always existed" and is considered a "standard practice for football clubs", pointing to the balance sheets featuring unknown players valued at millions. He recalled witnessing this phenomenon since the 1980s from within boards of directors, noting that Inter Milan continued to "spend and squander" despite carrying massive deficits. According to Taormina, false accounting remains a "recurring practice for all business owners, and football is no exception". He claimed to have foreseen Calciopoli and was also the lawyer of Franco Sensi, who spoke of a criminal conspiracy in football.

In 2008, Taormina said as a lawyer that the actions of Juventus lawyer Cesare Zaccone, who during the Calciopoli sports proceedings in the summer of 2006 had told the judge Cesare Ruperto that relegation to Serie B was an appropriate sanction, as "very serious". Although in reality Zaccone merely meant to say that Juventus (risking Serie C relegation) did not deserve any stronger sanctions than the other clubs, all of which were eventually saved from relegation, his words and actions came to be seen as if they were a guilty admission or plea deal request. Of Zaccone and the behaviour of the club owners during the disciplinary proceedings, Taormina further stated: "If there had been a malicious act, we would have called it unfaithful patronage." (Note: The lawyer or technical consultant who, by being unfaithful to his professional duties, causes harm to the interests of the party defended, assisted, or represented by them before the judicial authority or the International Criminal Court is considered a crime since 1930 in the Italian Penal Code. See "Art. 380 codice penale − Patrocinio o consulenza infedele". Brocardi.it (in Italian). 2 March 2024.) In 2011, Taormina presented a denounce to Rome's Public Prosecution Office, alleging match fixing in association football. In 2014, Taormina had a diatribe with an imitator of Luciano Moggi during the radio programme La Zanzara. (Note: During the broadcast, Taormina had said: "Everyone thinks what they think and takes responsibility for doing so, including me. Sports justice says that Juve, in football, is not an example to follow, and they did not get to Serie B by chance. Whether you, Moggi, have anything to do with it or not does not matter to me. Indeed, I have always defended you when people talked about you, I consider you a serious and polite person." Reminding Taormina that both sports and ordinary justice deemed the leagues to be regular and that there was no match-fixing, the Moggi imitator said: "I am tired of always hearing and reading the same things that are not true, we always talk about Moggi and Juventus, but Calciopoli is an invention, there are no [criminal] conspiracies, there are no corrupt referees, and I have never fixed matches. The term thief was used and it is not okay. You think about defending your clients and Roma, instead, which is indefensible.") In 2019, Taormina defined himself an enemy of Juventus and defended the club's ultras in the Last Banner inquiry about their pressure on the club to have tickets and season tickets, as well as their private violence towards other fans. (Note: In 2018, Taormina criticized the unrelated conviction of former Juventus player Vincenzo Iaquinta. Although he later sided with the ultras, Taormina had initially defended Juventus, saying: "Frankly, I think I can break a spear in favour of Juve because these are people who do not look at anyone when they act. [On strict liability] The blackmail is all there. Since in Italy personal responsibilities are very difficult to identify, then there is this thing of objective liability which is something that still spreads and governs a lot in sports, especially in football." One of the ultras Tormina defended was Umberto Toia, who had been convicted. Taormina said: "I went to see him [in prison] and he was bitter, because he had relations with Pairetto. Let's appeal to the Supreme Court and try to get him out." He also questioned the 7 July 2016 suicide of Bucci, another Juventus ultras, saying: "I will go all out on Bucci because it doesn't add up to me, and it is a story that is intertwined with what happened. If you kill yourself before talking to the prosecutor that's one thing, but if you do it after, what does it mean? I have very strong doubts. There are swellings that do not coincide with the hypothesis of suicide.") He exited from the legal team before the first-instance trial, which resulted in six convictions and six acquittals. Taormina was denounced for defamation by Alberto Pairetto, who had denounced the behavior of the club's ultras, due to Taormina's words about his father Pierluigi Pairetto. According to Pairetto's lawyer Maria Turco, Taormina's words were defamatory because they implied that he is able to influence the results of the matches due to his brother being a referee and thus explaining the alleged refereeing favours that Juventus would be rewarded with. (Note: Within the context of the Last Banner inquiry and entering the courthouse in October 2019 to carry out his mandate as defender of some Juventus ultra leaders indicted for criminal conspiracy and a series of ticket extortion schemes that Pairetto himself had reported and denounced, Taormina had said to the reporters of the major national newspapers: "I was surprised by the presence of Pairetto, son and brother of so many referees within Juventus and I did not think it could go this far. I, who have always screamed about refereeing advantages, have finally found objective confirmation." On 5 July 2022, the defamation trial began after the preliminary investigation judge found that it was worth a trial.)

In March 2024, Taormina commented on the Francesco Acerbi–Juan Jesus racist case during the broadcast of Il processo di Biscardi, alleging that the mediatic nature of the case had been "exaggerated", and argued that since Acerbi had apologized, he should be forgiven, as he risked a 10-match ban. (Note: The racist case refers to a controversy where Acerbi was acquitted of allegedly using a racial slur against Jesus—whom Acerbi allegedly told to "go away, Black" before reportedly using the term negro ("Go away black, you're just a n*****")—Italian Football Federation (FIGC) president Gabriele Gravina, who during his term was accused by his critics of favouring Inter, publicly supported the verdict, stating he believed Acerbi and that he intended to embrace him; this institutional stance was subsequently described by sports journalist Pino Taormina (not related) as entirely predictable, given the FIGC's initial conduct during the investigation. Taormina said that he was not surprised by Gravina's words and his reactions to the verdict, and explained: "The [Italian Football] Federation's position on the subject has always been very reliable, the first actions had already made it clear that we would move towards this line. Even Spalletti, who worked with the Napoli defender for many years, said he believed the Inter centre-back's story. I am amazed at those who are stunned by the FIGC president's declarations." Jesus briefly contemplated pursuing criminal justice; however, he was bound by the arbitration clause. For further context, see: Manusia, Daniele (19 March 2024). "Un altro caso di razzismo in cui nessuno è razzista". Ultimo Uomo (in Italian).; Bosher, Luke (19 March 2024). "Francesco Acerbi facing investigation over alleged racist abuse of Juan Jesus during Inter-Napoli". The New York Times.; "Juan Jesus porta Acerbi in tribunale? L'effetto Gravina può cambiare tutto". Tuttosport (in Italian). 27 March 2024. Archived from the original on 13 May 2026.; Casano, Danilo (28 March 2024). "Taormina: 'Le parole di Gravina sul caso Acerbi-JJ non mi sorprendono per un motivo'". Il Bello del Calcio (in Italian).) Acerbi, who had apologized to Jesus but then retracted it, was subsequently acquitted due to a lack of evidence, although Serie B and Serie C's precedents pointed to at least a 10-match ban even with lack of evidence, (Note: See "'Vai via nero, sei solo un negro': perché Acerbi è stato assolto per gli insulti razzisti a Juan Jesus". Today.it (in Italian). 26 March 2024.) and two disciplinary decisions from the FIGC's supreme court (the National Federal Tribunal), including one from the Joint Sections, held that it is sufficient to believe the victim as long as their testimony is credible. (Note: The 2024 sentence contrasted with precedent disciplinary proceedings by sports justice. In 2012 and 2023, Antonio Conte and Juventus were found guilty of alleged violations as part of two unrelated scandals of betting (2011–2012) and capital gains (2021–2023), respectively, under the guise of "couldn't not know" and without clear evidence that was instead required for the Francesco Acerbi–Juan Jesus racist case. In the 2020 and 2021 racist cases, the National Federal Tribunal had ruled: "[2020] Developing a logical reasoning, it seems likely that there is no other plausible reason suitable to justify the players' reaction other than that of having heard an certainly serious and offensive sentence. Furthermore, absolute certainty of the commission of the offense is not necessary, nor is it necessary to overcome reasonable doubt, but a lower degree of certainty is sufficient. ... [2021] The contested fact can be considered proven even if the evidentiary framework is formed only by the declarations of the injured person, provided that its reliability is subjected to positive scrutiny." See Galosso, Daniele (28 March 2024). "Caso Acerbi e l'altra giustizia sportiva: Juve, Conte e le condanne senza prove". Tuttosport (in Italian). The reliability of Juan Jesus was never put in doubt in the 2024 sentence. See "'Vai via nero, sei solo un negro': perché Acerbi è stato assolto per gli insulti razzisti a Juan Jesus". Today.it (in Italian). 26 March 2024.) Later in March 2024, Taormina commented that the decision was "not appropriate", arguing that it was necessary to make "a rule that allowed us to be more flexible, not just a 10-match ban". He added "it cannot be said that nothing happened" because something must have happened, and said that more balance was needed. He concluded that they handled the thing "as if nothing had happened" and that Acerbi had behaved "like a racist without him intending to be".

== Legal proceedings ==
During his career, Taormina found himself as a defendant in several trials. As part of his defence of Franzoni in the high-profile Cogne murder case, Taormina adopted an aggressive strategy, transforming the case into a media-driven trial. He sparked severe controversy with his legal strategies and the provocative claim that "evidence is fabricated", arguing that a defence lawyer within the Italian judicial system must actively hunt for, scientifically construct, and organize evidence rather than passively await the prosecution's findings. Following media leaks regarding an upcoming prosecution probe into alleged scene-tampering by his team, Taormina chose to file a formal "self-complaint" in September 2004 to force prosecutors to officially open a case and grant his team access to the investigation files. This legal move accelerated the offshoot investigation known as Cogne bis, leading to Taormina being officially placed under investigation for fraud and forgery in November 2004, alongside allegations that his team had planted fraudulent evidence to frame a neighbor. In 2009, all criminal fraud charges against Taormina were officially dismissed by the preliminary hearing judge due to a lack of conclusive evidence regarding his direct involvement. Conversely, Franzoni was brought to trial, and in 2011 was convicted of slander for the false accusations against the neighbor and sentenced to 1 year and 4 months, before the sentence of her conviction eventually expired in 2014 due to the statute of limitations. Following Franzoni's release after serving her murder sentence, Taormina initiated civil proceedings over unpaid legal fees (reported at €450,000), resulting in a court-ordered foreclosure on the Cogne villa. This was ultimately averted when the Lorenzis paid Taormina his legal fees, keeping the villa as a family refuge.

Despite having supported liberal opinions like the institution of homosexual civil unions in Italy during his political activity, Taormina made some controversial statements to La Zanzara in 2013, saying that he did not want to hire homosexual collaborators in his office. (Note: Taormina had said: "Gays have physical and mental anomalies, the majority of people think so. Homosexuals are abnormal, they have physical and genetic anomalies. ... I believe that we can know before birth, because there are genetic anomalies. ... Why do you have to impose your opinion on me, I think so and I will not let it shut my mouth. Some things disgust me. I have a crisis of rejection, I feel like vomiting. It disgusts me to see two people of the same sex doing dirty things. Relationships between men disgust me, they are sick people. However, as long as they do not bother others... [to the question: what if he had a gay son?] It would be an insurmountable tragedy. Of course violence cannot be exercised, resignation is needed. If he finds a separate residence I am fine with that. Kick him out? I would put him in a position to live in another house, not in my house. It has its habits, its needs and its acquaintances. I wouldn't allow it. At my house no no. ... public opinion is heterosexual, there is no doubt. We are not all in the same conditions.") The Bergamo Labour Court, following the appeal filed by the Advocate Association for LGBTI Rights – Lenford Network considered that Taormina's expressions were, as discriminatory towards homosexuals, suitable to dissuade certain subjects from submitting their candidacies to professional study and therefore likely to hinder their access to work or make it more difficult, in violation of the rules protecting equal treatment in terms of employment and working conditions. For this reason, Taormina was sentenced on 6 August 2014 to pay €10,000 as compensation for damages. Following the first-instance sentence, he challenged the measure on freedom of expression grounds, asking for its reform to the Brescia Court of Appeal, which explained the reasonings for rejecting his appeal on 23 January 2015, (Note: For the sentence, see "Sentenza n. 529/2014 pubbl. il 23/01/2015" (PDF). Articolo29. 23 January 2015.) and upheld his conviction on 11 December 2014. He subsequently presented a further appeal to the Supreme Court of Cassation, which involved the Court of Justice of the European Union after the Supreme Court of Cassation asked whether such a homophobic statement constitute discrimination in access to work. On 23 April 2020, the Court of Justice of the European Union confirmed the conviction and the payment of €10,000 in compensation.

In December 2013, Taormina was convicted of having falsified a document to request a referral to trial in the defamation trial against the former Aosta prosecutor Maria Bonaudo and the prosecutor Stefania Cugge; in the first-instance trial, he was sentenced to eights months. This conviction was upheld on appeal, before the Supreme Court of Cassation acquitted him in November 2015. In July 2024, as part of the Naples Anti-Mafia investigation into the false accusations against the Carabinieri of the Avellino Investigative Unit, which were dismissed by the Avellino Prosecutor's Office in the Aste Ok trial, prosecutor Henry John Woodcock placed Taormina, who was Gianluca Formisano's defence attorney, under investigation by the Naples Prosecutor's Office. Taormina was accused of attempting to force witness Daniela Marra (also under investigation) to change her story. In response, Taormina announced lawsuits. (Note: Taormina told Italy's leading news agency ANSA: "I am warning of lawsuits and complaints for the news published by press outlets and television stations that have swindled me into contacting witnesses to offer them benefits so they would make false statements in the recently concluded trial in Avellino regarding the illicit management of auctions.. Not only has no one ever given false testimony, even though it has nothing to do with me, but no one is accusing me, starting with Naples Prosecutor's Office, of having had contact with witnesses I was never able to have because they were unknown to me. No one accuses me, not even the Naples Prosecutor's Office, of having had contact with the same witnesses, promising them benefits in obtaining false testimony. The Naples Prosecutor's Office cannot accuse me of such a thing and does not accuse me. I warn against further slanderous or defamatory initiatives. I am certain that the public prosecutor handling this matter, Mr. Woodcock, will quickly establish the physical non-existence of evidence against me, simply because the incriminating contacts are not included in the charges filed." He also told Il Fatto Quotidiano: "I have never heard of any money being promised, and I have never acted as an intermediary for any deal. I met Marra only once in July 2021 to hear her as a witness. How could I offer money if I did not know her? This is incredibly serious. I was not notified of anything; it is obviously a guarantee on my behalf. I know nothing about Formisano's activities; I certainly did not act as an intermediary for him. Are they filing a lawsuit against me for what just happened with the CSM [the Italian institution of constitutional importance entrusted to preside over the organization of the judiciary]?")

== Personal life ==
Taormina is married to Celestina Del Signore. In 2022, after more than forty years of civil union, the two married under the Catholic rite. On 28 May 2009, Taormina was the victim of a €2.3 million theft (jewels and cash money) in his villa. The Supreme Court of Cassation annulled the acquittals and called for a new appeal trial.
