= Francesco Fonti =

Italian criminal (1948–2012)

Francesco Fonti (February 22, 1948 – December 5, 2012) was an Italian criminal and a member of the 'Ndrangheta, a Mafia-type organisation in Calabria, who became a turncoat (pentito) collaborating with the authorities. He revealed radioactive waste dumping by the 'Ndrangheta.

== Early criminal career ==
He was initiated in the 'Ndrangheta in 1966 by Francesco Commisso in Siderno, the right-hand man of Antonio Macrì, the undisputed boss at the time. In 1975, Macrì was killed in the so-called First 'Ndrangheta war. Fonti moved to the Pelle-Romeo clan from San Luca, headed by Sebastiano Romeo. He reached the rank of vangelo.

He began as a drug courier, between Lombardy and Emilia-Romagna, and was sentenced to 50 years in prison for drug trafficking. From January 1994 he was a collaborator of justice (pentito). His testimony covered the role of the clans from San Luca in the 'Ndrangheta, the Second 'Ndrangheta war and the constitution of La Provincia, a provincial commission of the 'Ndrangheta formed at the end of the war in September 1991, to avoid further internal conflicts.

== Toxic waste trafficking in Italy ==
In 2005, Fonti revealed radioactive waste dumping by the 'Ndrangheta in the news magazine L'espresso. Fonti's allegations, first made to prosecutors in 2003, included that at least 30 ships loaded with toxic waste, much of it radioactive, were sunk off the Italian coast. His statements led to widespread investigations into the radioactive waste disposal rackets.

Fonti personally sank three ships and identified a wreck located 28 kilometres off the coast of Cetraro, in Calabria, as MV Cunsky. He said he sank the ship himself in 1992, complete with 120 barrels of toxic and radioactive waste. He said the 'Ndrangheta received £100,000 for the job. Fonti had been put on the job by his boss Sebastiano Romeo in collaboration with Giuseppe Giorgi. Another 'Ndrangheta boss involved was Natale Iamonte who sank ships near Melito di Porto Salvo.

Both Fonti and Legambiente, an Italian NGO for the protection of the environment, claimed vessels were sent to Somalia and other developing countries such as Kenya and Zaire with toxic cargoes, which were either sunk with the ship or buried on land. Legambiente alleges that local rebel groups were given weapons in exchange for receiving the waste ships. Fonti claims that Italian TV journalist Ilaria Alpi and her cameraman Miran Hrovatin were murdered in 1994 in Somalia because they had seen toxic waste arrive in Bosaso, Somalia.

According to Fonti, a manager of ENEA, Italy's state energy research agency, paid 'Ndrangheta clans to get rid of 600 drums of toxic and radioactive waste from Italy, Switzerland, France, Germany, and the US, with Somalia as the destination, where the waste was buried after buying off local politicians. Shipments to Somalia continued into the 1990s, while the 'Ndrangheta clan also blew up shiploads of waste, including radioactive hospital waste, and sending them to the sea bed off the Calabrian coast.

However, the vessel they surveyed off Cetraro in deep waters off the coast of Calabria turned out to be a passenger steamship sunk by a German submarine in 1917. Consequently, one of the prosecutors questioned the reliability of Fonti on the alleged sinkings, despite the fact that his collaboration with the authorities since 1994 had resulted in high-profile arrests of 'Ndrangheta members involved in drug trafficking.

== The search for Aldo Moro ==
Fonti was also involved in attempts to locate the place in Rome where the Christian Democrat politician and former Prime Minister Aldo Moro was held by the militant communist group the Red Brigades after they had kidnapped him on March 16, 1978. He received the task from Romeo, who had been asked by unnamed national and Calabrian Christian Democrats such as Riccardo Misasi and Vito Napoli to help out.

With the help of the Italian military intelligence agency SISMI and the criminal organisation the Banda della Magliana, Fonti was able to locate the house where Moro was kept. When he reported to Romeo, the latter said that he had done a good job but that important politicians in Rome had changed their minds. Moro's body was found later after he was shot.

== Death and legacy ==
Fonti died on December 5, 2012, of "natural causes" as a result of his poor health, in a hospital near the secret location where he lived since his collaboration with the authorities.

Fonti became famous in Italy and abroad when, after having left the witness protection program and having served a period of imprisonment, he exposed the thorny matter of toxic waste dumping by the 'Ndrangheta. In prison, he had learned some details about the disposal of radioactive waste and, with the hope of being re-admitted to the protection program he posed as the "sinker" of three vessels with nuclear waste. However, a report of the Parliamentary Commission of Inquiry into toxic waste dumping had serious doubts on the declarations of Fonti. The three ships Fonti mentioned have never been found on the spot he indicated he sank them.
