= Cetraro =

Cetraro Citrarium/Katárion
- Comune
- Comune di Cetraro
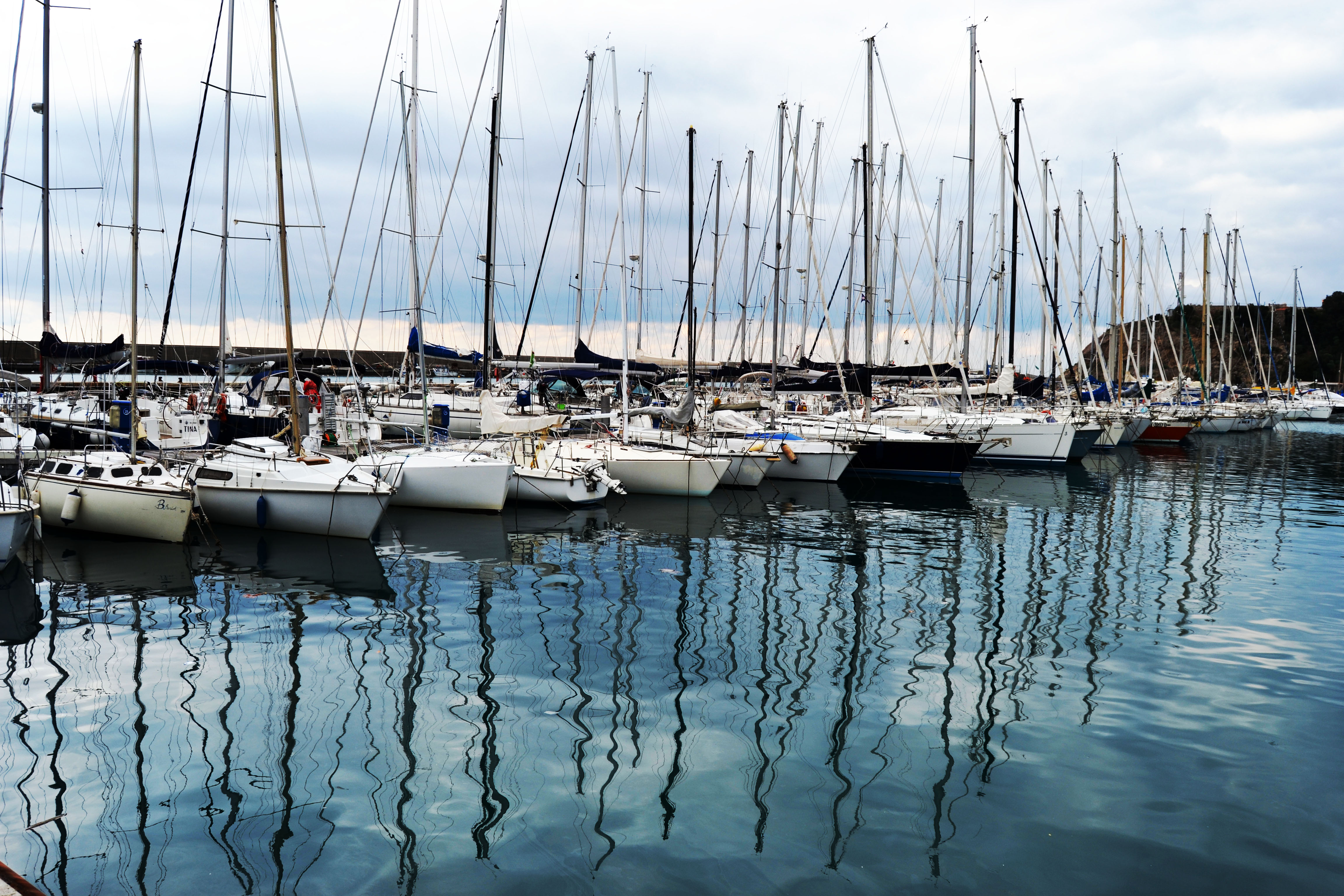

- Location within Italy Location within Calabria
- Coordinates: 39°30′N 15°57′E
- Country: Italy
- Region: Calabria
- Province: Cosenza (CS)
- Frazioni: Acqua degli Angeli, Angilla, Borgo San Marco, Bosco, Caparrua, Ceramile, Difisa, Lampetia, Malvitani, Manche, Massete, Mulini, Paese (u Paisi), Palazzese, Palazzuola, Rammaticò, San Biagio, San Filippo, San Francesco, San Giacomo, San Pietro, Sant'Angelo, Santa Lucia, Santa Maria di Mare, Santu Ianni, Scevuza, Sinni, Sopra l'Irto, Treselle, Vonella

Area
  - Total: 66.14 km^{2} (25.54 sq mi)
- Elevation: 120 m (390 ft)

Population (31 December 2018)
  - Total: 10,006
  - Density: 151.3/km^{2} (391.8/sq mi)
- Demonym: Cetraresi
- Time zone: UTC+1 (CET)
  - Summer (DST): UTC+2 (CEST)
- Postal code: 87022
- Dialing code: 0982
- Patron saint: St. Benedict of Nursia
- Saint day: 11 July
- Website: Official website

Cetraro (Calabrian: U Citràru) is a town and comune in the province of Cosenza in the Calabria region of southern Italy.

== Waste dumping ==
The 'Ndrangheta, an Italian mafia syndicate, has been accused by pentito Francesco Fonti, a former member of 'Ndrangheta, of sinking at least 30 ships loaded with toxic waste, much of it radioactive. In 2005, Fonti revealed the conspiracy in the news magazine L'espresso. His statements led to widespread investigations into the radioactive waste disposal rackets, involving Giorgio Comerio and his disposal company, the Odm (Oceanic Disposal Management).

According to Fonti a manager of Enea paid the clan to get rid of 600 drums of toxic and radioactive waste from Italy, Switzerland, France, Germany, and the US, with Somalia as the destination, where the waste was buried after buying off local politicians. Former employees of Enea are suspected of paying the criminals to take waste off their hands in the 1980s and 1990s. Shipments to Somalia continued into the 1990s, while the 'Ndrangheta clan also blew up shiploads of waste, including radioactive hospital waste, and sending them to the sea bed off the Calabrian coast.

Fonti revealed that he personally sank three ships and identified a wreck located 28 kilometres off the coast of Cetraro, in Calabria, by environmental workers as MV Cunsky and says he sunk it himself in 1992, complete with 120 barrels of toxic and radioactive waste. He said 'Ndrangheta received £100,000 for the job.

Fonti had been put on the job by his boss Sebastiano Romeo of the 'Ndrangheta clan from San Luca in collaboration with Giuseppe Giorgi. Another 'Ndrangheta boss involved was Natale Iamonte who sank ships near Melito di Porto Salvo.

However, the vessel they surveyed off Cetraro in deep waters off the coast of Calabria turned out to be a passenger steamship sunk by a German submarine in 1917. Consequently, one of the prosecutors questioned the reliability of Fonti on the alleged sinkings, despite the fact that his collaboration with the authorities since 1994 had resulted in high-profile arrests of 'Ndrangheta members involved in drug trafficking.

== People ==
- Riccardo Pizzuti actor

== Sources ==
- Andreoli, Carlo; Angelica, Fabio (2007). Chiese di Cetraro – Storia, arte, fede, pietà popolare nei "nostri" luoghi di culto. Editoriale progetto 2000.
