= Toxic waste dumping by the 'Ndrangheta =

Environmental crime

The 'Ndrangheta, a criminal organization from Calabria, Italy, has been involved in radioactive waste dumping since the 1980s. Ships with toxic and radioactive waste were sunk off the Italian coast. In addition, vessels were allegedly sent to Somalia and other developing countries with toxic waste, including radioactive waste cargoes, which were either sunk with the ship or buried on land. The introduction of more rigorous environmental legislation in the 1980s made illegal waste dumping a lucrative business for organized crime groups in Italy. The phenomenon of widespread environmental crime perpetrated by criminal syndicates like the Camorra and 'Ndrangheta has given rise to the term "ecomafia".

A 1995 parliamentary waste commission report spoke of the "possible existence of national and international trafficking in radioactive waste, managed by business and criminal lobbies, which are believed to operate also with the approval of institutional subjects belonging to countries and governments of the European Union and outside the EU." Its conclusions noted "interferences and threats" against investigators, and were critical of ENEA, Italy's state energy research agency, and their management of nuclear waste.

== Waste dumping off Italian coast ==
The 'Ndrangheta, an Italian mafia-type syndicate, has been accused by pentito Francesco Fonti, a former member of 'Ndrangheta, of sinking at least 30 ships loaded with toxic waste, much of it radioactive. In 2005, Fonti revealed the conspiracy in the news magazine L'espresso. His statements led to widespread investigations into the radioactive waste disposal rackets, involving Giorgio Comerio and his disposal company, the Odm (Oceanic Disposal Management).

Legambiente, an Italian NGO for the protection of the environment, provided the public prosecutor's office with all the data collected by Legambiente since 1994 concerning the disappearance of at least 40 ships in Mediterranean waters. Over two decades, Italian prosecutors have looked into more than 30 suspicious deep-water sinkings. They suspect that Italian and foreign industrialists have acted in league with the 'Ndrangheta, and possibly government agencies, to use the Mediterranean as a dumping ground. Vessels that sank in fair weather had suspicious cargo, sent no mayday or the crew vanished.

According to Fonti, a manager of ENEA paid the clan to get rid of 600 drums of toxic and radioactive waste from Italy, Switzerland, France, Germany, and the US, with Somalia as the destination, where the waste was buried after buying off local politicians. Former employees of ENEA are suspected of paying the criminals to take waste off their hands in the 1980s and 1990s. Shipments to Somalia continued into the 1990s, while the 'Ndrangheta clan also blew up shiploads of waste, including radioactive hospital waste, sending it to the bottom of the sea off the Calabrian coast.

Fonti personally sank three ships and identified a wreck located 28 kilometres off the coast of Cetraro, in Calabria, by environmental workers as MV Cunsky and says he sank it himself in 1992, complete with 120 barrels of toxic and radioactive waste. He said 'Ndrangheta received £100,000 for the job. Fonti had been put on the job by his boss Sebastiano Romeo of the 'Ndrangheta clan from San Luca in collaboration with Giuseppe Giorgi. Another 'Ndrangheta boss involved was Natale Iamonte who sank ships near Melito di Porto Salvo.

However, the vessel they surveyed off Cetraro in deep waters off the coast of Calabria turned out to be a passenger steamship sunk by a German submarine in 1917. Consequently, one of the prosecutors questioned the reliability of Fonti on the alleged sinkings, although his collaboration with the authorities since 1994 had resulted in high-profile arrests of 'Ndrangheta members involved in drug trafficking.

== Alleged delivery of toxic waste to Somalia ==
Both Fonti and environmental group Legambiente claimed vessels were sent to Somalia and other developing countries such as Kenya and Zaire with toxic cargoes, which were either sunk with the ship or buried on land. Legambiente alleges that local rebel groups were given weapons in exchange for receiving the waste ships. Fonti claims that Italian TV journalist Ilaria Alpi and her cameraman Miran Hrovatin were murdered in 1994 in Somalia because they had seen toxic waste arrive in Bosaso, Somalia.

According to Fonti, Christian Democrat politicians, including former prime minister Ciriaco De Mita, had been involved in illegal disposal operations, using the secret service SISMI to cover up their connection. De Mita denied the allegations. Fonti also claimed that Socialist politicians Gianni De Michelis and Bettino Craxi intervened to ensure that Italian peacekeeping troops in Somalia turned a blind eye to the transports.

The huge waves which battered northern Somalia after the 2004 Indian Ocean tsunami were initially believed to have stirred up illegally dumped toxic and nuclear waste. There are also heavy metals such as lead, cadmium and mercury. The waves broke up rusting barrels and other containers and hazardous waste dumped along the long, remote shoreline in the war-racked country during the early 1990s, according to the United Nations Environment Programme (UNEP).

However, a United Nations technical fact-finding mission in 2005 did not find any traces of toxic waste along the shorelines after the tsunami. In 2006, the Somali NGO Daryeel Bulsho Guud, with access to the different warring clans, conducted a survey and identified 15 containers of "confirmed nuclear and chemical wastes" in eight coastal areas. A source with the United Nations Development Programme (UNDP) described the search for hazardous material in Somalia as "like looking for a needle in a haystack. It's not that they don't know it's there ... but that they don't know where to start looking for it."

== See also ==
- Triangle of death (Italy)
- Ocean disposal of radioactive waste
