= Iamonte =

Iamonte is a surname. It may refer to:

- Giuseppe Iamonte (1949–2019), Italian criminal and member of the 'Ndrangheta
- Natale Iamonte (1927-2015), Italian criminal and boss of the 'Ndrangheta
- 'Ndrina Iamonte, Italian crime family from Melito di Porto Salvo, in the Province of Reggio calabria
