= The Cruelest Day =

- Directed by: Ferdinando Vincentini Orgnani
- Written by: Marcello Fois; Ferdinando Vincentini Orgnani
- Produced by: John Cesaroni; Gherardo Pagliei
- Cinematography: Giovanni Cavallini
- Music by: Paolo Fresu
- Release date: 28 March 2003
- Running time: 120 minutes
- Country: Italy

The Cruelest Day (Italian: Ilaria Alpi - Il più crudele dei giorni) is a 2003 Italian biographical drama film directed by Ferdinando Vicentini Orgnani. It is a dramatization of the last days of life of RAI journalist Ilaria Alpi and of her cameraman Miran Hrovatin before they were murdered in Mogadishu, Somalia, on 20 March 1994. For her performance Giovanna Mezzogiorno won the Nastro d'Argento for best actress.

== Cast ==
- Giovanna Mezzogiorno: Ilaria Alpi
- Rade Šerbedžija: Miran Hrovatin
- Erika Blanc: Luciana Alpi
- Giacinto Ferro: Giorgio Alpi
- Angelo Infanti: Giancarlo Marocchino
- Amanda Plummer: Karin
- Andrea Renzi: Francesco
- Tony Lo Bianco: General Loy
