= Giuseppe Drugman =

Italian painter

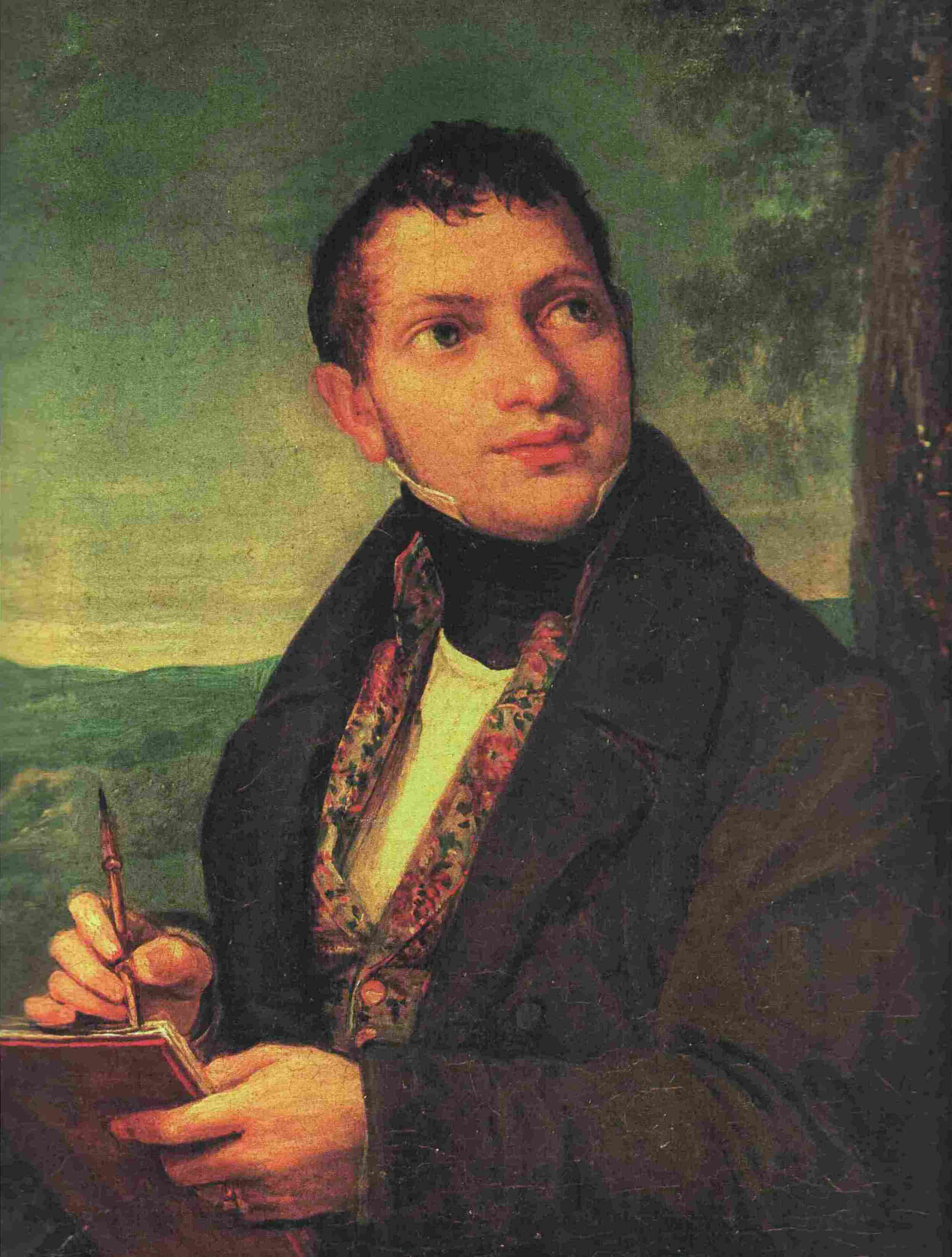
Self-portrait (c.1830)

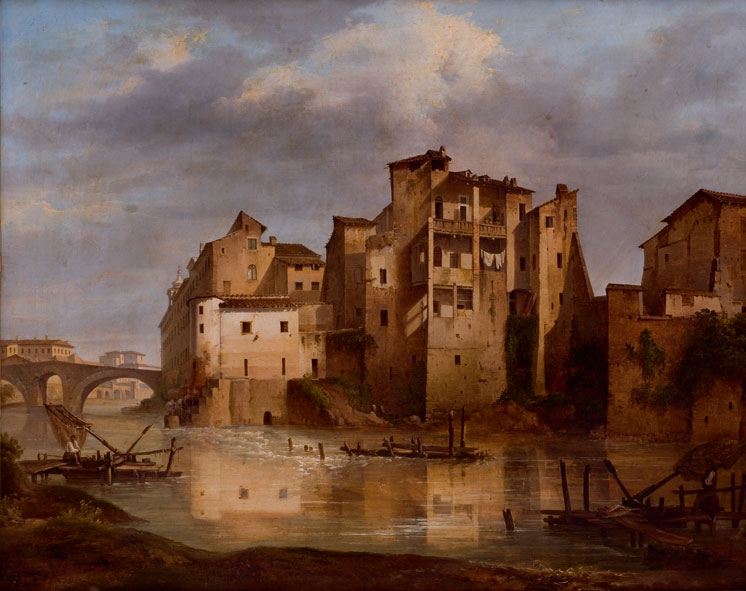
Tiber Island

Giuseppe Drugman (27 April 1810 – 1 October 1846) was an Italian landscape and cityscape painter.

== Biography ==
He was born in Parma, where his father was a carpenter and woodcarver at the ducal court. He attended the Academy of Fine Arts in Parma, where he studied with the landscape painter, Giuseppe Boccaccio. During the uprisings of 1831, he and his brother Massimo were suspected of belonging to the Carbonari, but were eventually cleared. In 1835, he participated in a competition for young artists sponsored by Duchess Maria Luigia. The first prize was 18 months to study in Rome. He was awarded the prize in the landscape category for his painting of a deer hunt.

He went to Rome in 1837 and began sending his canvases home; notably scenes of Tiber Island and the Colosseum, done in a style reminiscent of Claude Lorrain. Towards the end of his stay, he spent some time in Albano.

He returned to Parma in the summer of 1838, was married, and began executing commissions for the Court, including views of the Palazzo del Giardino and several vedute of Parma. He also substituted for Boccaccio as a landscape teacher at the Academy whenever the latter visited Naples. In 1841, he was especially busy with commissions, doing canvases of the Ducal Palace of Colorno, as well as other vedute of Parma, including:

- Fishpond in the Ducal Garden
- The Road from Parma to La Spezia
- At Monte Prinzera
- Close to the Taro
- Parma Seen from the Road to Langhirano
- New Bridge over the Sporzana near Fornovo di Taro
- Entry to the Royal Citadel
- New Royal Barracks at the Citadel

In 1844 he, Luca Gandaglia (c.1780–c.1850) and Giuseppe Giorgi were engaged to paint scenes from the operas I Lombardi and Maria di Rohan at the Teatro Regio. He also painted for the court Veduta della nuova strada di Berceto (1844), a veduta del reale Casino dei Boschi (1845), and a veduta del reale giardino di Parma (1846).

He died in Parma of tuberculosis, aged only 36.

In 2014, a retrospective of his works was held at the Museo Glauco Lombardi. A small street in Parma is named after him.
