= Vangelo =

Rank within criminal organisation

The Vangelo is a high rank within the 'Ndrangheta, a criminal organisation in Calabria (Italy). Vangelo literally means Gospel and a member is called a vangelista (plural: vangelisti). The rank was established around 1978, when the rank of santista (a member of La Santa) became inflated because the original membership of 33 expanded.

The grade was revealed by the historical pentito of the 'Ndrangheta Pino Scriva in 1984. The vangelisti are “superior personalities who know the rights and obligations of the honoured society with decision-making duties at the highest level,” according to the pentito Francesco Fonti.

The referential religious figures are all the Apostles and Saint Peter and Saint Paul, while the historical figures are Giuseppe Mazzini as the founder and promoter of secret societies in general, and Count Camillo Benso di Cavour representing the mind of a statesman.

Later, the rank of vangelista was followed by the institution of the position of trequartino (three-quarters) or quintino (fifth). Finally, the current highest rank of associazione (society) was established – reserved for the supreme bosses of the 'Ndrangheta.

Important vangelista were Giuseppe Muià from Siderno, Domenico Martino, Sebastiano Romeo, Antonio Pelle and members from the Nirta family from San Luca.
