= La Santa =

Secret society in Calabria, Italy

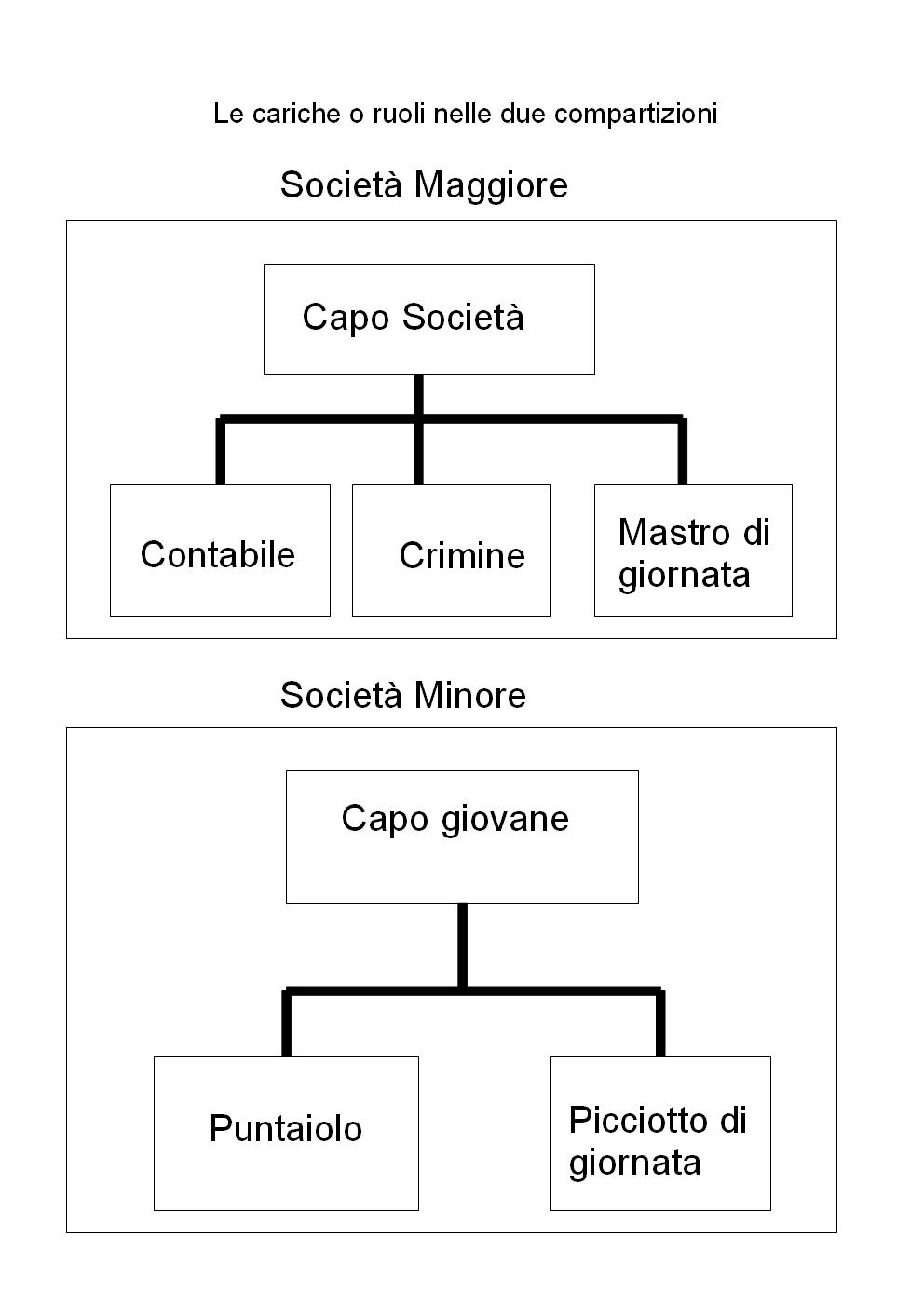
Roles in Ndrangheta Hierarchy

La Santa is a secret society within the 'Ndrangheta, a criminal organisation in Calabria (Italy). The name probably derives from the shortening of mamma santissima. In mafia slang, the expression is used to refer to mafia chiefs. Mamma santissima literally means "most holy mother" and refers to the Virgin Mary, who is regarded as the protector of the 'Ndrangheta.

The Santa was an innovation in the traditional stratification of the 'Ndrangheta introduced in the early 1970s to maximize the power and invisibility of the most important bosses. Security concerns led to the creation of a secret society within the secret society. Membership in the Santa is only known to other members. Contrary to the 'Ndrangheta code, it allowed bosses to establish close connections with state representatives, even to the extent that some were affiliated with the Santa. These connections were often established through the Freemasonry, which the santisti – breaking another rule of the traditional code – were allowed to join.

The rank of santista was established at the end of the 1960s by Girolamo Piromalli, leader of the Piromalli family in Gioia Tauro, and by the chiefs of several other families. They were eager to modify the traditional rules of the 'Ndrangheta in order to enter the public works market and start illegal activities such as drug trafficking, which were prohibited by the 'Ndrangheta’s traditional code but promised to be very profitable. According to Gaetano Costa (the former boss of the Messina 'ndrina), "it was Mommo Piromalli who – given the enormous interests which the existed in the Reggio Calabria area (the railroad stump, the steelwork centre, and the port in Gioia Tauro, etc.) – entrusted himself with the rank of santista, in order to assert his higher authority and hence directly control the public works. He said that this rank had been given him directly in Toronto, where there was a very important 'ndrina."

It was precisely on account of these innovations that the new institution was opposed by the more traditionalist bosses, such as Antonio Macrì from the Ionic town of Siderno, the 'Ndrangheta’s charismatic leader of the 1960s, and Domenico Tripodo, who was the dominant figure of the Reggio Calabria clans. Only at the end of the so-called First 'Ndrangheta war, which took place in 1974-76 and led to their deaths and the consequent rise of the De Stefano brothers as the new leaders of the Reggio Calabria 'Ndrangheta, was the new institution fully recognized.

The Santa was originally set up as an exclusive body restricted to 33 people. Only when a santista died another member was allowed to enter it. As the years went by, an inflation took place in assigning the status of santista. Around 1978, a new higher rank was established: the vangelo. Later this was followed by the institution of the position of trequartino (three-quarters) or quintino (fifth). Finally, the current highest rank of associazione (society) was established – reserved for the supreme bosses of the 'Ndrangheta.

== Notable Santisti ==
- Girolamo Piromalli
- Paolo De Stefano
- Antonio Nirta
- Giuseppe Nirta
- Francesco Nirta
- Natale Iamonte
- Santo Araniti
- Antonio Mammoliti
- Rocco Gioffrè
