= Pentedattilo =

Human settlement in Melito di Porto Salvo, Metropolitan City of Reggio Calabria, Italy

Coordinates: 37°57′15.2″N 15°45′40.1″E

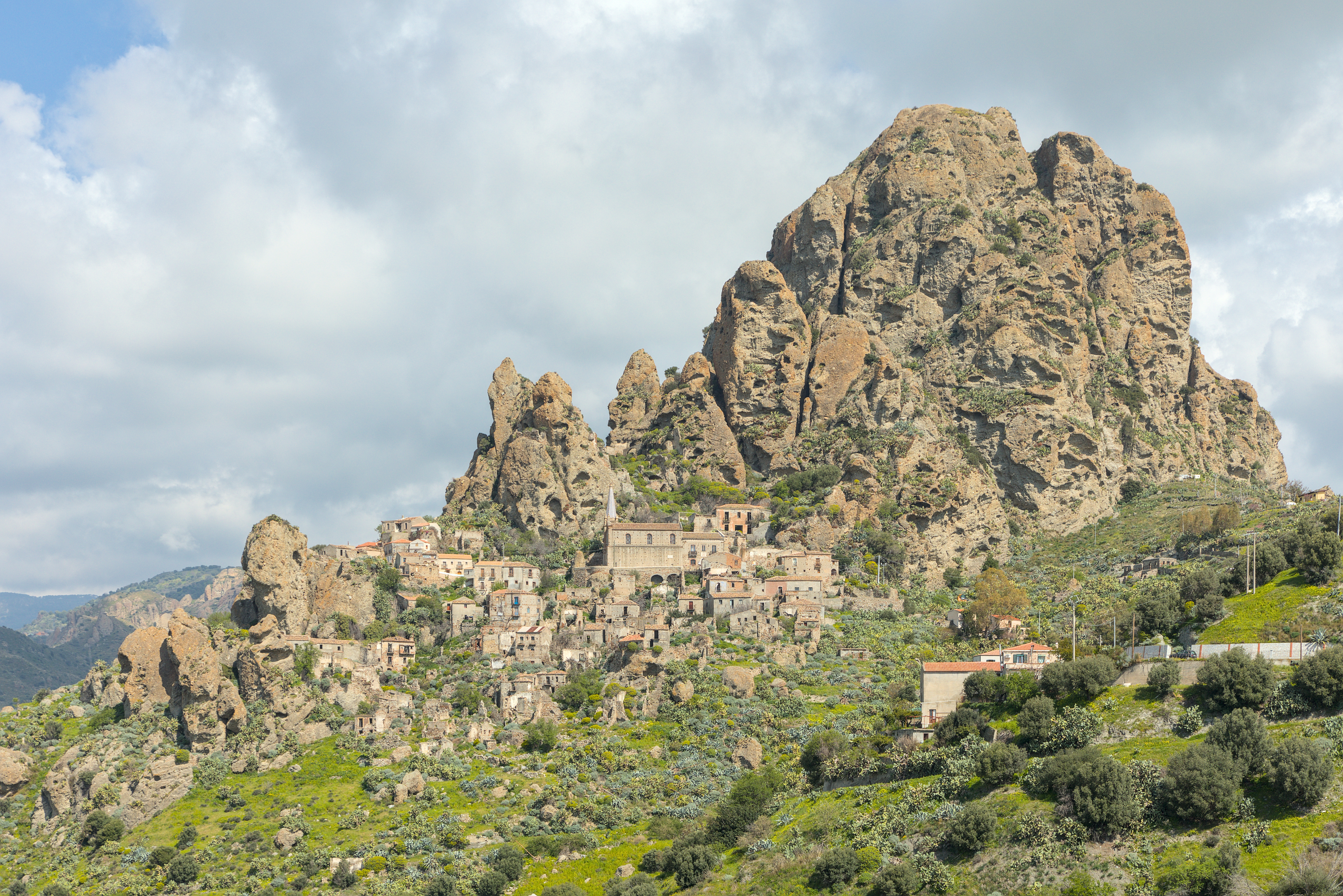
Panorama of Pentedattilo.

Pentedattilo (Calabrian Greek: Πενταδάκτυλο - Pentadàktilo) is a small village in Calabria, southern Italy, administratively a frazione of Melito di Porto Salvo. Until 1811, before the unification of Italy, it was a separate commune. It is situated at 250 m above the sea level, on the Monte Calvario, a mountain whose shapes once resembled that of five fingers (whence the name, from the Greek pente + daktylos , meaning "five fingers"). Pentedattilo is another ex-Greek speaking village in the isolated Calabrian region. Ιt lost its Greek language during the late 19th century.

== History ==
The town was founded as a colony of the Greek city of Chalcis, in 640 BC. A flourishing commercial town during the Greater Greece and Roman eras, it declined during the Byzantine domination, when it was sacked by the Saracens and by others.

In the 12th century it was conquered by the Normans, and, together with Capo D'Armi, Condofuri and Montebello Ionico, it became part of a baronial fief under the Abenavoli family. These were succeeded by the Francoperta, from Reggio Calabria, and then by the Alberti (until 1760), the Clement and the Ramirez (1823).

The town was severely damaged by an earthquake in 1783, which caused the migration of much of the population to the nearby Melito Porto Salvo. The town remained totally uninhabited from the mid-1960s to the 1980s, when it was partially restored and repopulated by volunteers from across Europe.

The town, now a ghost town, hosts a yearly film festival.

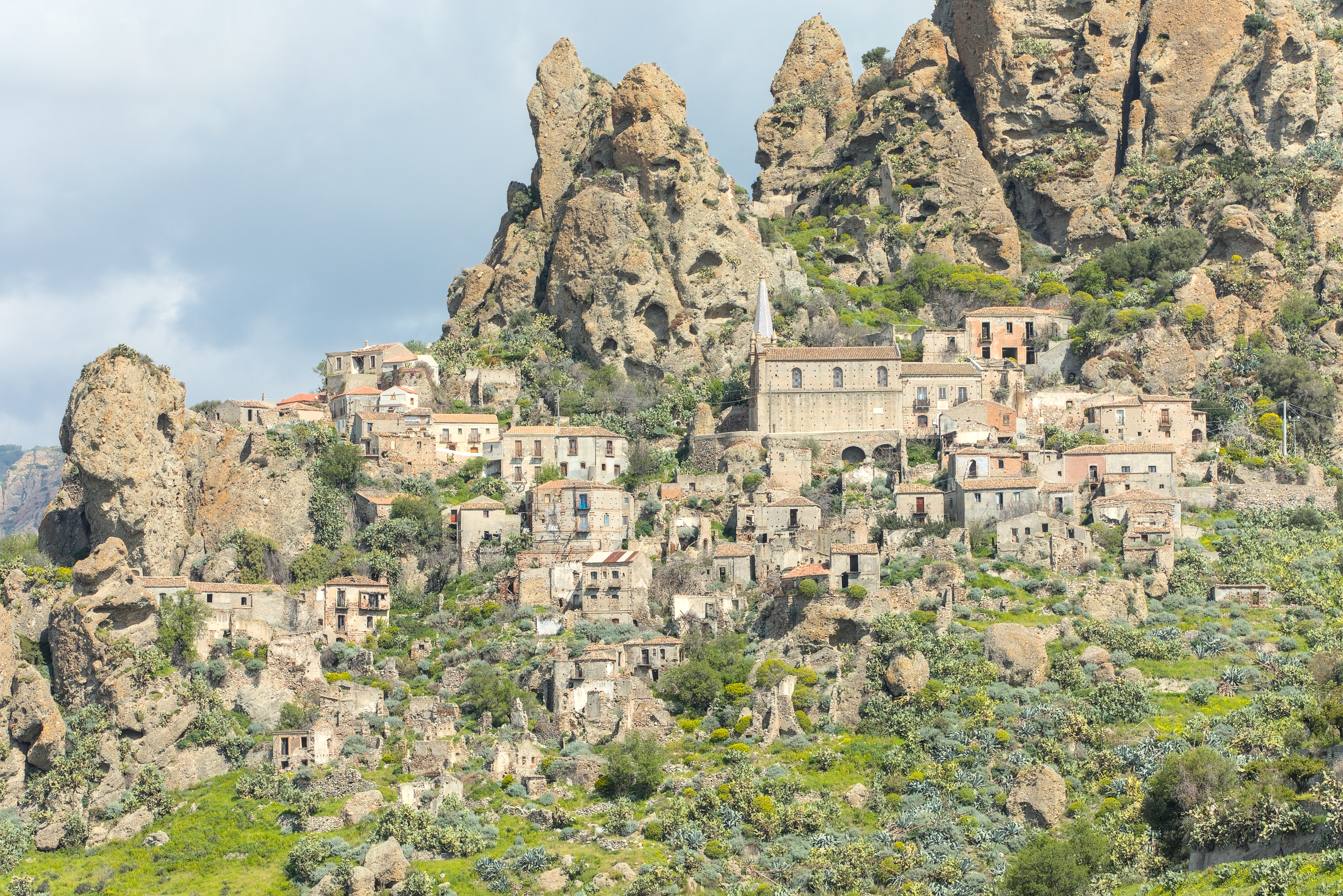
The old village

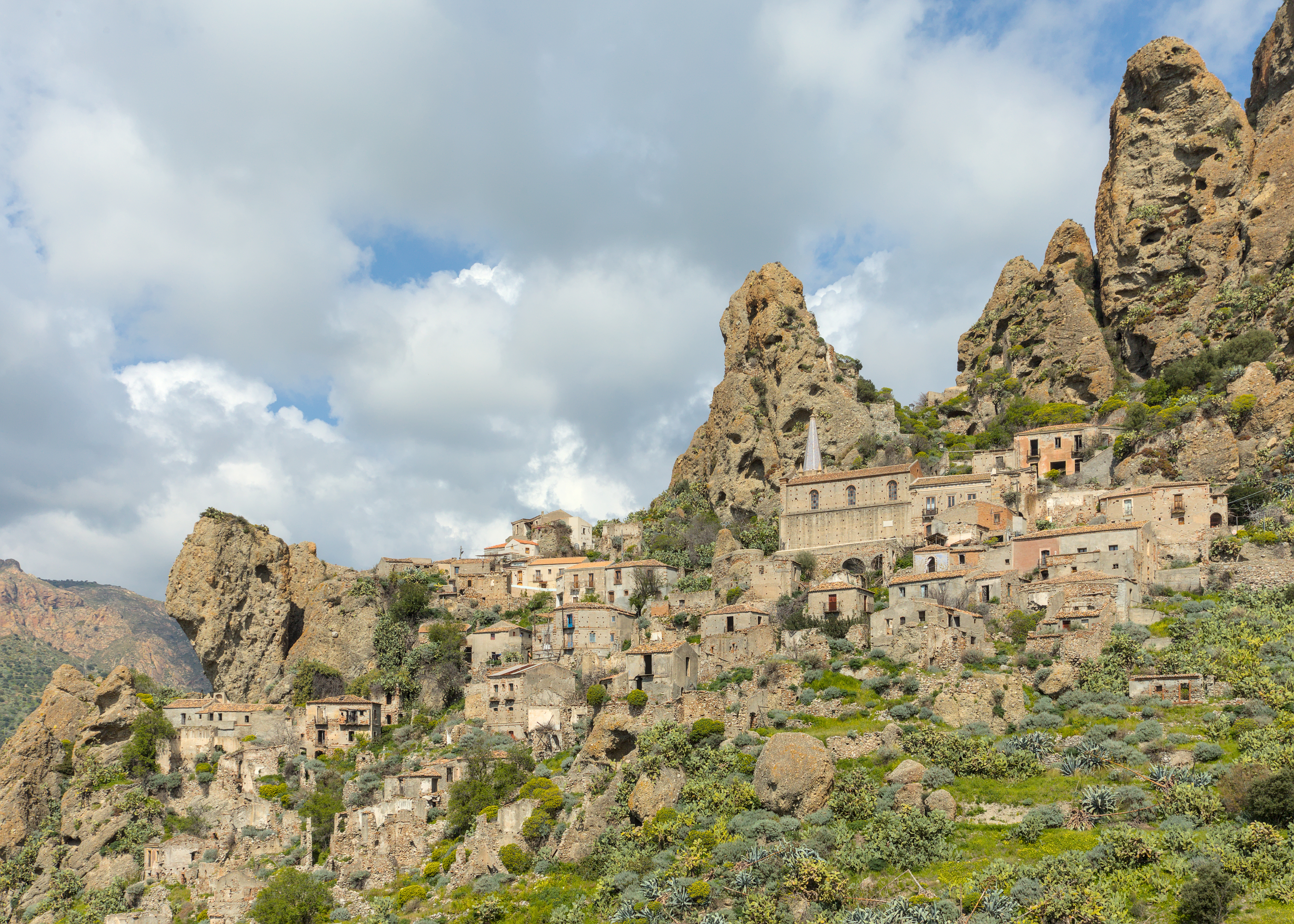
The old village

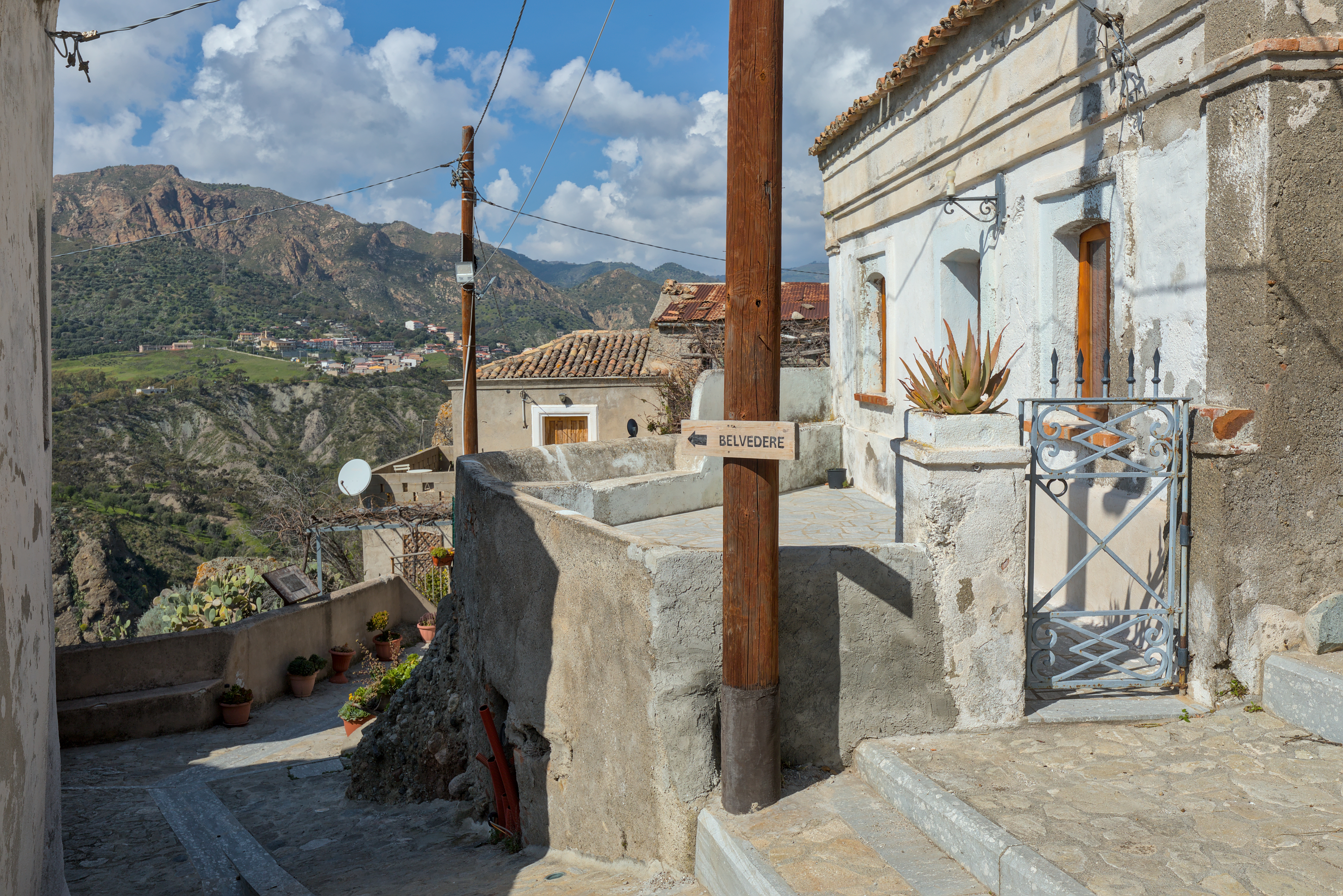
A lane in the old village

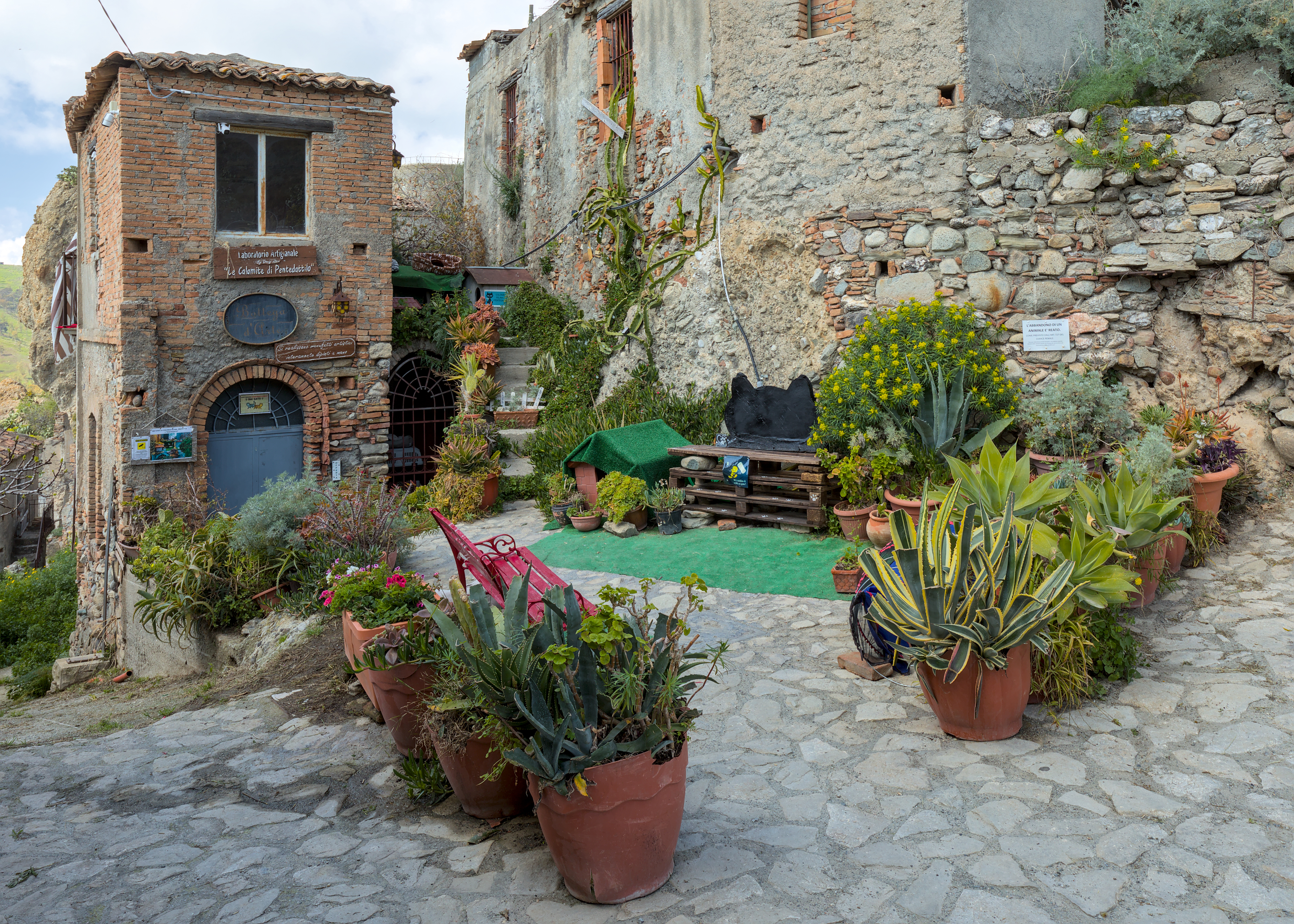
A tiny square in the old village

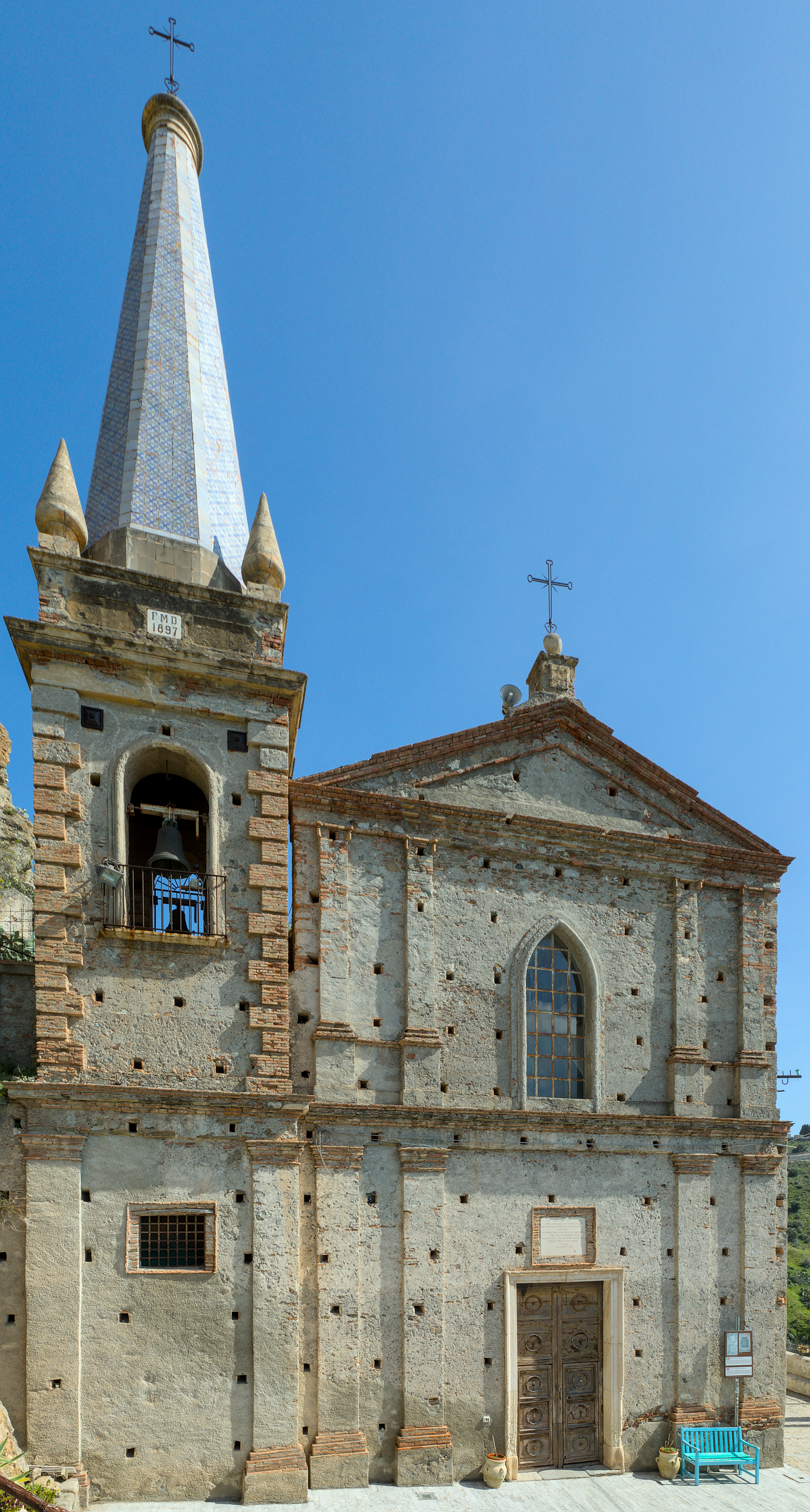
Church of saints Peter and Paul

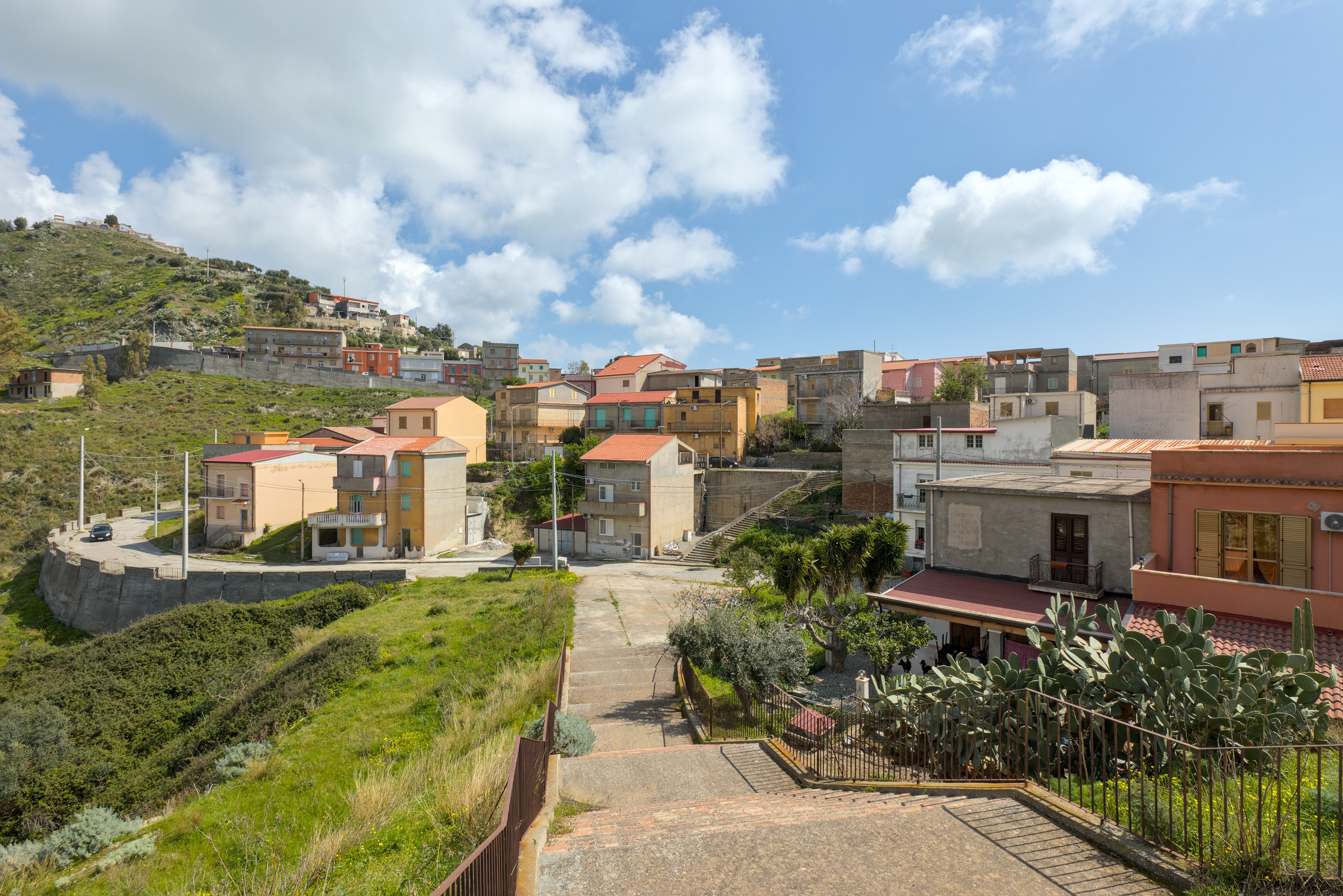
Pentedattilo Nuovo, where part of the inhabitants moved when the old village was abandoned

== See also ==
- Aspromonte National Park
- Greek-Calabrian dialect
- Pentadaktylos, mountain with the same name in Cyprus
