= Giuseppe Iamonte =

Italian criminal (1949–2019)

Giuseppe Iamonte (Italian pronunciation: [dʒuˈzɛppe jaˈmonte]; 1949 – 28 August 2019) was an Italian criminal and a member of the 'Ndrangheta. He was a fugitive since 1993 and included in the list of most wanted fugitives in Italy until his capture in May 2005.

Born in Melito di Porto Salvo, he was the son of the notorious historical mob boss of the clan Natale Iamonte, originally based in Melito di Porto Salvo on the Ionic coast of Calabria, yet the reach of the mob members quickly spread throughout Italy.

He was arrested on 14 May 2005, to serve a 20-year sentence on charges of mafia association and drug trafficking.

His brother Vincenzo Iamonte, also wanted since 1993, was arrested two and a half months later on 30 July 2005.
