= Franco Fiorito =

Italian politician (born 1971)

Regional councilor of Lazio
- In office 2005–2012

Mayor of Anagni
- In office 2001–2005

Franco Fiorito (born 13 July 1971) is an Italian politician. Fiorito served for seven years as Lazio regional councilor and was the leader of PDL political party in the Lazio region until 2012. He was also the mayor of Anagni between 2001 and 2005.

Fiorito was sentenced to three years and four months in prison for embezzlement in 2013. In 2017, his sentence was reduced to three years.

== Key positions ==
- Former mayor of Anagni
- Former regional leader of the People of Freedom (PDL)
