= Giuseppe Giorgi =

- Born: 6 March 1961 (age 65); San Luca, Reggio Calabria, Italy
- Other name: 'u capra
- Allegiance: 'Ndrangheta

Giuseppe Giorgi (Italian pronunciation: [dʒuˈzɛppe ˈdʒordʒi]; born 6 March 1961) is an Italian criminal belonging to the 'Ndrangheta, a criminal organisation in Calabria. After having been a fugitive for 23 years and been included on the list of most wanted fugitives in Italy he was captured in his home town San Luca on 2 June 2017.

== Background ==
He had been wanted for criminal association and arms and drug trafficking, extortion and murder.

Also known as 'u capra ("the goat"), Giorgi belongs to the Pelle-Romeo-Vottari clan from San Luca and is the son-in-law of the boss Sebastiano Romeo. According to the pentito (informer) Francesco Fonti, he has been involved in the illegal disposal of toxic and radioactive waste, as well as the smuggling of niobium – a metal used in nuclear reactors. Ships loaded with hazardous waste were sunk with dynamite off the Italian coast.

== Capture and aftermath ==
While on the run, Giorgi is believed to have resided in Germany. However, he was arrested in an underground bunker in his home town San Luca on 2 June 2017 after a five-hour police search. Residents of the town stirred outrage after they gathered outside the house of Giorgi to pay their respects as he was being arrested. After being a fugitive for nearly half of his life, Giorgi has to serve a 28-year and nine-month sentence for an international drug trafficking and other offenses.
