= Cogne case =

2002 murder in Italy

The Cogne case (known in Italian as Delitto di Cogne) involved the death of three-year-old Samuele Lorenzi on 30 January 2002 while sleeping in his parents' bed in his family home in the mountain village of Montroz, hamlet of Cogne, in Aosta Valley, northern Italy. The cause of death was found to be several blows to the skull. The murder weapon has never been found.

In July 2004, an Italian court sentenced Samuele's mother, Annamaria Franzoni to 30 years in prison for aggravated murder. However, on 27 April 2007 the Corte d'assise d'appello in Turin reduced Franzoni's penalty to 16 years of jail for homicide.

On 21 May 2008, the Corte di Cassazione confirmed the decision of the appeal court and Annamaria Franzoni was arrested. On 17 September 2020, the Italian judges confirmed the immobiliar distraint of the house located in Montroz, to satisfy a professional credit of 245.000 euro for the attorney Carlo Taormina.
