= Ilaria Alpi =

Italian journalist (1961–1994)

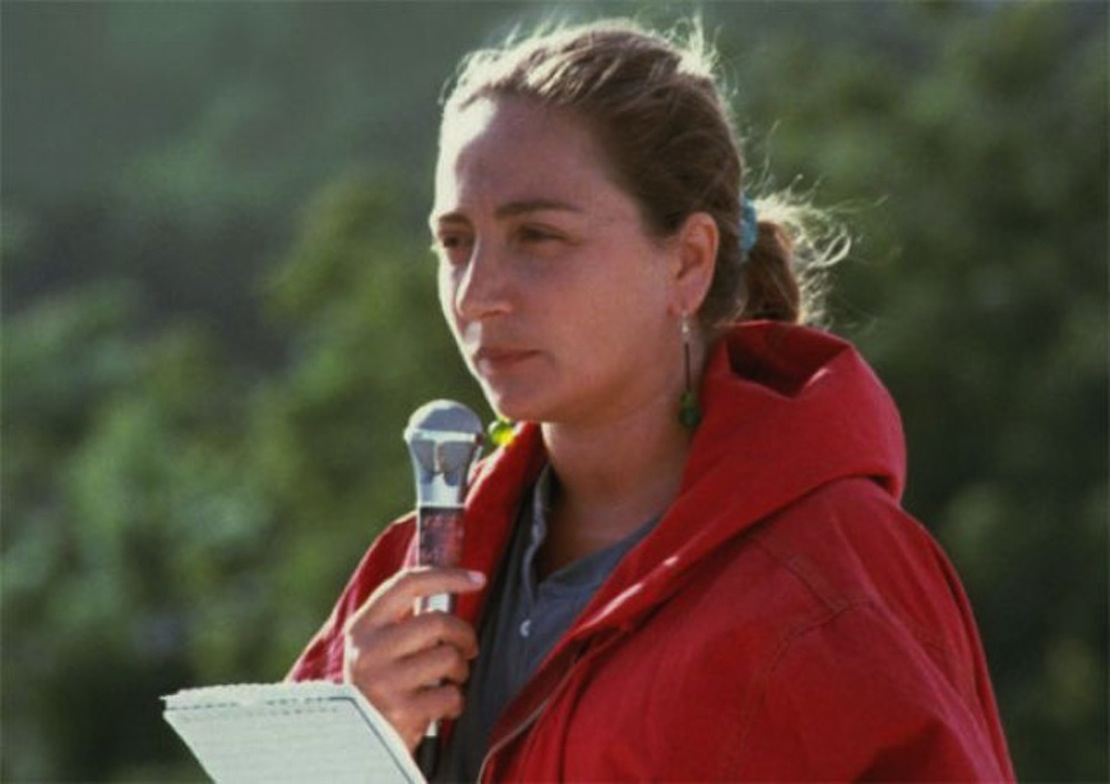
- Born: 24 May 1961; Rome, Italy
- Died: 20 March 1994 (aged 32); Mogadishu, Somalia
- Education: Sapienza University of Rome
- Occupation: Journalist

Ilaria Alpi (24 May 1961 – 20 March 1994) was an Italian journalist, who was murdered in Mogadishu, Somalia, together with her camera operator Miran Hrovatin. In 2009 Francesco Fonti, a former 'Ndrangheta member, claimed that Alpi and her cameraman were murdered because they had seen toxic waste shipped by the 'Ndrangheta arrive in Bosaso, Somalia.

At the time of her murder, Alpi was following a case of weapon and illegal toxic waste trafficking in which she believed the Italian Army and other institutions were also involved. Alpi was born in Rome and worked for Italian public television broadcaster RAI. In the 2002 movie Ilaria Alpi - Il più crudele dei giorni, directed by Ferdinando Vincentini Ornagni, she is portrayed by Giovanna Mezzogiorno.

== Biography ==
After graduating high school at the "Titus Lucrezio Caro" gymnasium of Rome, she graduated in literature after completing language courses and Islamic culture in the Department of Oriental Studies of the Sapienza University of Rome.Thanks to her excellent knowledge of languages (Arabic, French, English), she won the first journalist writing from Cairo on behalf of Paese Sera and L'Unità. Later she won a scholarship to be taken to Rai. She is buried in the Cemetery Flaminio in Rome. Her mother, Luciana Riccardi Alpi (1933–2018), undertook, from the first trial, a battle to seek the truth and bring down all sorts of misdirections on the murder of the journalist and the cameraman.

== Investigation into waste trafficking in Somalia ==
Ilaria Alpi arrived in Somalia for the first time in December 1992 to follow, as a TG3 correspondent, the peace mission Restore Hope, coordinated and promoted by the United Nations to put an end to the civil war that broke out in 1991, after the fall of Siad Barre. Italy also took part in the mission, thus overcoming the reservations of the special envoy for Somalia, Robert B. Oakley, linked to the ambiguous relations that the Italian government had maintained with Barre during the eighties.

== Death ==
On 20 March 1994, Alpi and Miran Hrovatin were gunned down in an ambush on their jeep in Mogadishu by a seven-man commando unit after returning from Bosaso, while they were in Mogadishu reporting for Rai 3. In 2000, Somali citizen Hashi Omar Hassan was convicted and sentenced to 26 years in prison for the double murder. In October 2016, a court in Perugia, Italy, reversed the conviction and Hassan was awarded more than three million euros for the wrongful conviction and nearly 17 years he had spent in prison. On 20 March 2014, 20 years after their deaths, the Italian government reportedly authorized the declassification of secret files into their deaths.

== Legacy ==
Between 1995 and 2014, the Ilaria Alpi Award was an annual prize for documentary film investigative journalism dedicated to Alpi and presented in Riccione. In 2015, it changed its name to the DIG Award. In 1997, the Gang dedicated the song Chi ha ucciso Ilaria Alpi? (Who killed Ilaria Alpi?), while in 2010 the Pooh wrote the song Reporter, poignant ballad on the album Dove comincia il sole dedicated to Ilaria and her illustrious colleague, Oriana Fallaci. The 2003 film Ilaria Alpi - Il più crudele dei giorni by Ferdinando Vicentini Orgnani recounts Alpi's story.

In 2007, it made its debut at the Prize Ilaria Alpithe monologue civil theater "The Holiday" which reconstructs the case of Ilaria and Miran. Written and performed by Marina Senesi, actress and voice of Radio 2 Caterpillar in collaboration with Sabrina Giannini, journalist of Report. In 2011, at the invitation of Don Luigi Ciotti work was represented on the stage of the "XVI Day of the memory and the commitment against the mafie" and the National Day of Libera.

In May 2009, Daniel Biacchessi wrote Alpi's story in his book Passion reporter. The ONG Emergency has titled the surgical centre of Battambang, Cambodia. They were then named several streets, parks, schools, libraries and other public places. The high school of Rutigliano in the Metropolitan City of Bari was name after Alpi.

== Plaques and awards ==
- 1994, Plate, Community Open, Riccione
- 1994, Plate, Prize National to Professionalism, Serrone, Fiuggi
- 1995, Plate, Association of Journalists, Turin
- 1994, Prize, Clean pens, Sarteano, Siena
- 2005, Prize, Antonio Russo, Francavilla al mare, Chieti
- 2003, Prize, Mario de Murtas, Alghero
- 1995, Prize, the book, International Fair, Messina
- Plate, circumscription VIII, Rome
- 1994, Prize, National Chia for the record photographic and television, Chia, Cagliari
- 1994, Prize, Prof. G. Moscati, Casanova, Caserta
- 1995, Prize, Professional Reporter: the image of journalism in film.
- 1995, Journalist Award Roberto Ghinetti, San Miniato, Pisa
- 1994, Plate, Memory Serming
- 1994, Prize journalism, Rotary Club – Carlo Casalegno, Rome
- 2003, Prize journalism, Andrea Barbato, Mantua
- 2003, 04, 05, Prize journalism, Chamber of Deputies
- Journalist Award, Roma per Roma, Campidoglio
- 1995, Prize, Antonino Buttitta, Messina
- Honorary citizenship and Gold Medal, Sesto San Giovanni, Milan

== See also ==
- List of unsolved murders (1980–1999)
