= Sebastiano Romeo =

Sebastiano Romeo (8 January 1931 – 19 January 1998), also known as U Staccu, was a historical 'Ndrangheta boss from San Luca in Calabria. His family was allied with others in the Pelle-Romeo-Vottari clan, and he was a member of the Vangelo, an exclusive high rank within the 'Ndrangheta.

He also became a member of Camera di Controllo, a provincial commission of the 'Ndrangheta, formed at the end of the Second 'Ndrangheta war in September 1991 to avoid further internal conflicts. He was involved in drug trafficking and the dumping of toxic and radioactive waste off the coast in Italy.

According to the 'Ndrangheta turncoat (pentito) Francesco Fonti, Romeo was involved in attempts to locate the place in Rome where the Christian Democrat politician and former Prime Minister Aldo Moro was held by the militant communist group the Red Brigades after they had kidnapped him on 16 March 1978. Romeo had been asked by unnamed national and Calabrian Christian Democrats such as Riccardo Misasi and Vito Napoli to help out.

With the help of the Italian military intelligence agency SISMI and the criminal organisation the Banda della Magliana, Fonti was able to locate the house where Moro was kept. When he reported to Romeo, the latter said that he had done a good job but that important politicians in Rome had changed their minds. Moro's body was found later after he was shot.

Sebastiano Romeo died at home on 19 January 1998, at the age of 67. He was under house arrest due to medical problems. He was succeeded by his son Antonio Romeo, assisted by Sebastiano's brother, who is also named Antonio Romeo. His son was arrested on 26 June 1998.
