= Natale Iamonte =

- Mugshot of 'Ndrangheta boss Natale Iamonte
- Born: 7 May 1927; Melito di Porto Salvo, Italy
- Died: 2 February 2015 (aged 87); Melito di Porto Salvo, Italy
- Allegiance: 'Ndrangheta

Natale Iamonte (Italian pronunciation: [naˈtaːle jaˈmonte]; 7 May 1927 – 2 February 2015), sometimes spelled as Jamonte, was an Italian criminal and a historical boss of the 'Ndrangheta, a Mafia-type organisation in the region of Calabria, in southern Italy. The Iamonte 'Ndrina is based in Melito di Porto Salvo and Montebello Ionico on the Ionic coast of Calabria. Iamonte was a member of La Santa, a secret society within the 'Ndrangheta, introduced in the early 1970s to maximize the power and invisibility of the most important bosses. He also became a member of the Camera di Controllo, a provincial commission of the 'Ndrangheta formed at the end of the Second 'Ndrangheta war in September 1991, to avoid further internal conflicts.

== From butcher to millionaire ==
Iamonte rose to power by killing the local Ndrangheta boss Giuseppe Trimarchi in the 1960s. Originally a butcher, he made his fortune skimming off public contracts destined for the development of Calabria which was among the poorest regions of Italy. The construction of a refinery of Liquichimica in Saline Ioniche – a project that would amount to 300 billion lire – was one those projects that was completed in 1979. The plant never became operative because it was built on unstable terrain, subject to landslides, despite the warnings of the head of the local civil engineer office who died in a strange car accident.

The port inside the plant was subsequently used to offload arms and drug shipments from the Middle East against the payment of a fee to the Iamonte clan which controlled the territory. The service included transports for the Sicilian Mafia boss, Nitto Santapaola, who headed the Catania Mafia family on Sicily's east coast. Iamonte and his ally Paolo De Stefano secured arms and drug transports when the harbour of Catania was controlled too strictly. In return Santapaola helped the Iamonte clan to get subcontracts for the construction of a railway repair yard in Saline with the construction company of Carmelo Costanzo from Catania.

== Political connections ==
According to several pentiti (Mafia turncoats) Giacomo Mancini – a one time secretary of the Italian Socialist Party (PSI) and two times government minister – was supported by Iamonte who delivered the necessary votes to get him elected in Parliament. Mancini allegedly tried to adjust the sentence of Natale's son Vincenzo Iamonte, and helped to acquire contracts for the construction of the Liquichimica plant. Mancini denied any links with the 'Ndrangheta boss, and was acquitted of the charges.

== Explosives ==
The Iamonte clan held a large deposit of explosives. The stock originated from the vessel Laura C. which was sunk by a British submarine in 1941 near Saline Ioniche while carrying some 700 metric tonnes of explosives from Naples to North Africa. Apparently part of it was recuperated by the clan and might have been used for the bomb that killed Antimafia judge Giovanni Falcone in May 1992 and the bombing campaign by the Sicilian Mafia in 1993 in the Via dei Georgofili in Florence, in Via Palestro in Milan and in the Piazza San Giovanni in Laterano and Via San Teodoro in Rome, which left 10 people dead and 93 injured as well as damage to centres of cultural heritage such as the Uffizi Gallery.

Iamonte was also involved in radioactive waste dumping by the 'Ndrangheta, sinking ships near Melito di Porto Salvo.

== Arrest ==
Natale Iamonte was sent in internal banishment in 1988 to the north of Italy. The measure was meant to remove him from the criminal environment in Calabria. He stayed in Desio with his relative Natale Moscato, a local town councillor for urban planning with the Italian Socialist Party (PSI). The Iamonte clan started to invest their illicit profits in the area. In December 1995, the police seized assets worth 50 billion lire in the Brianza region, near Milan.

Iamonte was arrested in November 1993. He was succeeded by his sons, Vincenzo and Giuseppe Iamonte, who were arrested in May and July 2005.
