= Miran Hrovatin =

Italian photographer and camera operator (1949–1994)

- Born: 11 September 1949; Trieste, Italy
- Died: 20 March 1994 (aged 44); Mogadishu, Somalia
- Occupations: Photographer, camera operator

Miran Hrovatin (11 September 1949 – 20 March 1994) was an Italian photographer and camera operator killed in Mogadishu, Somalia, together with journalist Ilaria Alpi, under mysterious circumstances.

== Background and death ==
Hrovatin belonged to the Slovenian ethnic community of Trieste. He had initially worked for the agency Alpe Adria and later for the agency Videoest of Trieste.On 20 March 1994, he and Ilaria Alpi were killed when their jeep was ambushed in Mogadishu by a seven-man commando unit after returning from Bosaso, while they were in Mogadishu reporting for Rai 3. With them were a bodyguard, who escaped unharmed and disappeared, and the driver Sid Abdi who was also unhurt.

Miran was in Somalia to cover the Somali Civil War and investigate illegal traffic of weapons and toxic waste possibly concerning also the Italian Army and other Italian institutions.In 2000, Somali citizen Hashi Omar Hassan was convicted and sentenced to 26 years in prison for the double murder. In October 2016, a court in Perugia, Italy, reversed the conviction and Hassan was awarded more than three million euros for the wrongful conviction and nearly 17 years he had spent in prison.

== Aftermath ==
In May 2009, Daniel Biacchessi wrote the story of Miran in his book Passion reporter.On 20 March 2014, 20 years after their death, the Italian government has reportedly authorized the declassification of secret files into their death. The Ilaria Alpi Award for Television Journalism (Italian: Premio giornalistico televisivo Ilaria Alpi) was created in his honor.

== See also ==
- List of unsolved murders (1980–1999)
