= Melito di Porto Salvo =

Melito di Porto Salvo Mèlitu (Sicilian) Μέλιτο(ς) (Greek)
- Comune
- Comune di Melito di Porto Salvo
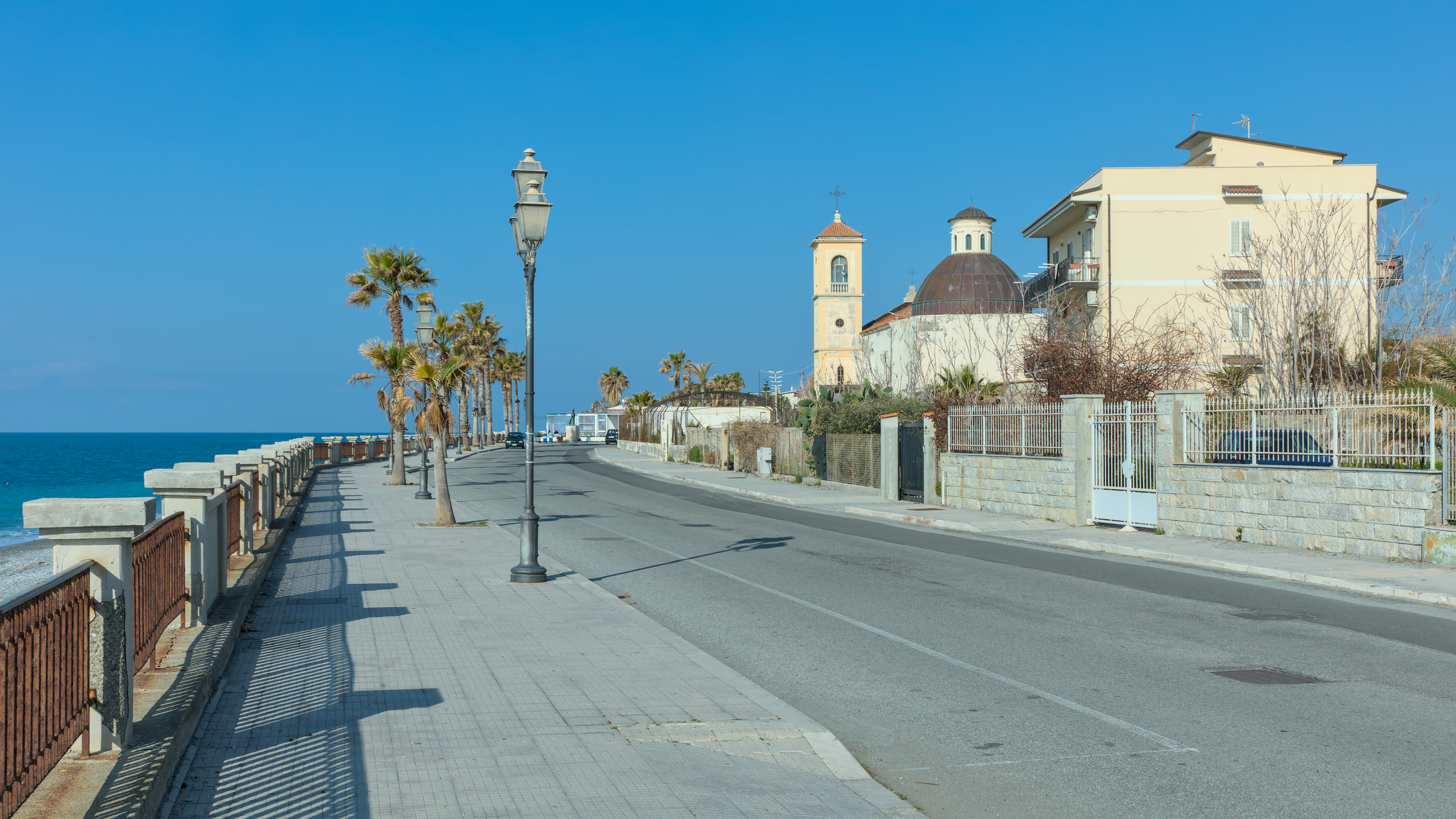
- Seaside street with St Mary church on the right

- Coat of arms

- Location within Italy Location within Calabria
- Coordinates: 37°55′N 15°47′E
- Country: Italy
- Region: Calabria
- Metropolitan city: Reggio Calabria (RC)
- Frazioni: Annà (Calabrian Greek: Anne), Lacco (Calabrian Greek: Làko), Lembo, Musa (Calabrian Greek: Mùssa), Musupuniti (Calabrian Greek: Mussopunite), Pallica (Calabrian Greek: Pallikè), Pentedattilo (Calabrian Greek: Pentadàktilo), Pilati, Prunella, San Leonardo.

Government
  - Mayor: Giuseppe Meduri

Area
  - Total: 35.3 km^{2} (13.6 sq mi)
- Elevation: 28 m (92 ft)

Population (31 December 2013)
  - Total: 11,416
  - Density: 323/km^{2} (838/sq mi)
- Demonym: Melitesi/Melitoti
- Time zone: UTC+1 (CET)
  - Summer (DST): UTC+2 (CEST)
- Postal code: 89063
- Dialing code: 0965
- Patron saint: Madonna di Porto Salvo
- Saint day: 8 December
- Website: Official website

Melito di Porto Salvo (Calabrian: Mèlitu; Calabrian Greek: Μέλιτος Mèlitos or Μέλιτο Mèlito) is a comune (municipality) in the Metropolitan City of Reggio Calabria in the Italian region Calabria, located about 130 kilometres (81 mi) southwest of Catanzaro and about 25 kilometres (16 mi) southeast of Reggio Calabria; and is also the southernmost municipality on the Italian Peninsula. It is part of the Bovesia Greek-speaking area of Calabria, occupying a hilly area which descends towards the Ionian Sea.

The ghost town of Pentedattilo is part of the comune.

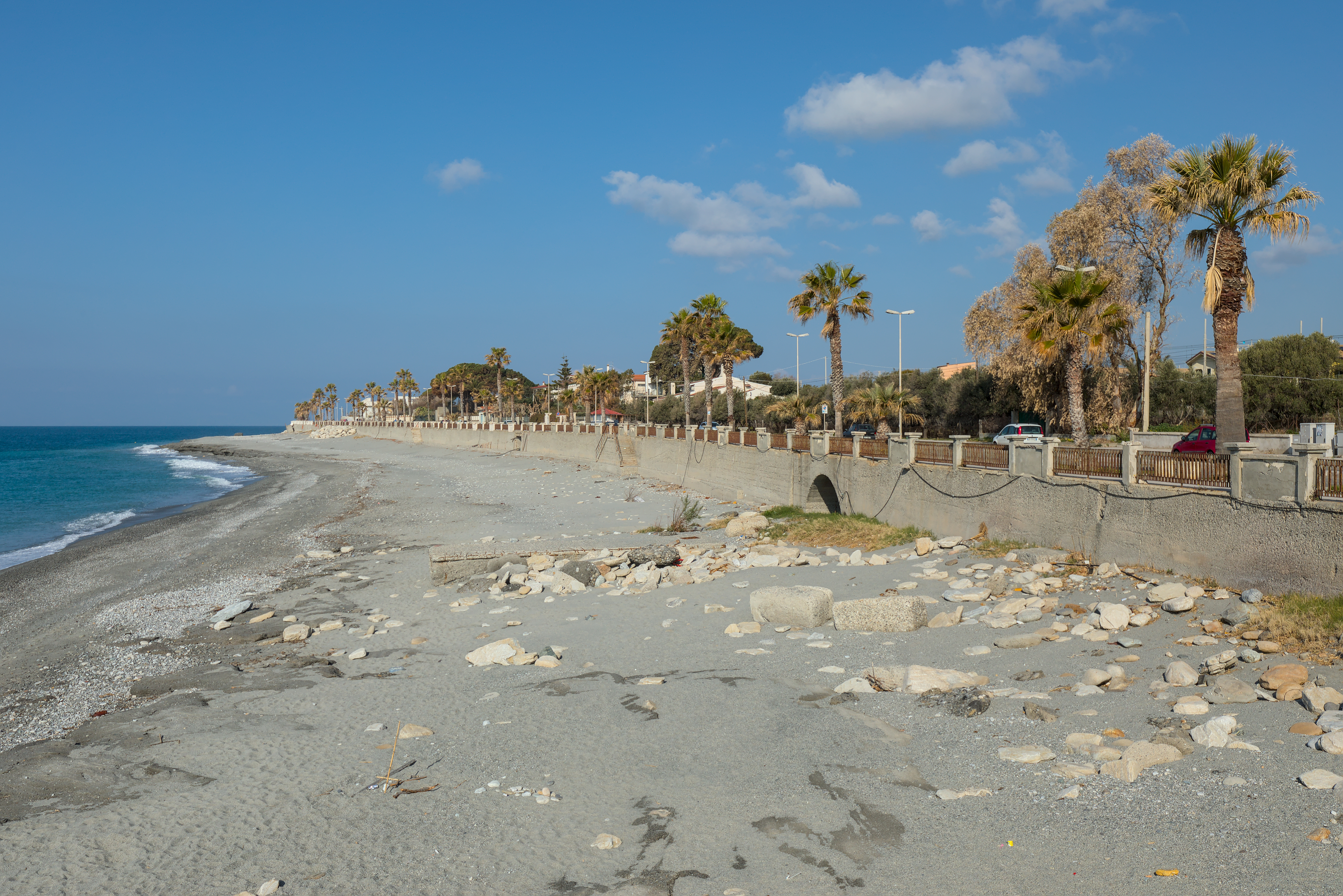
Beach

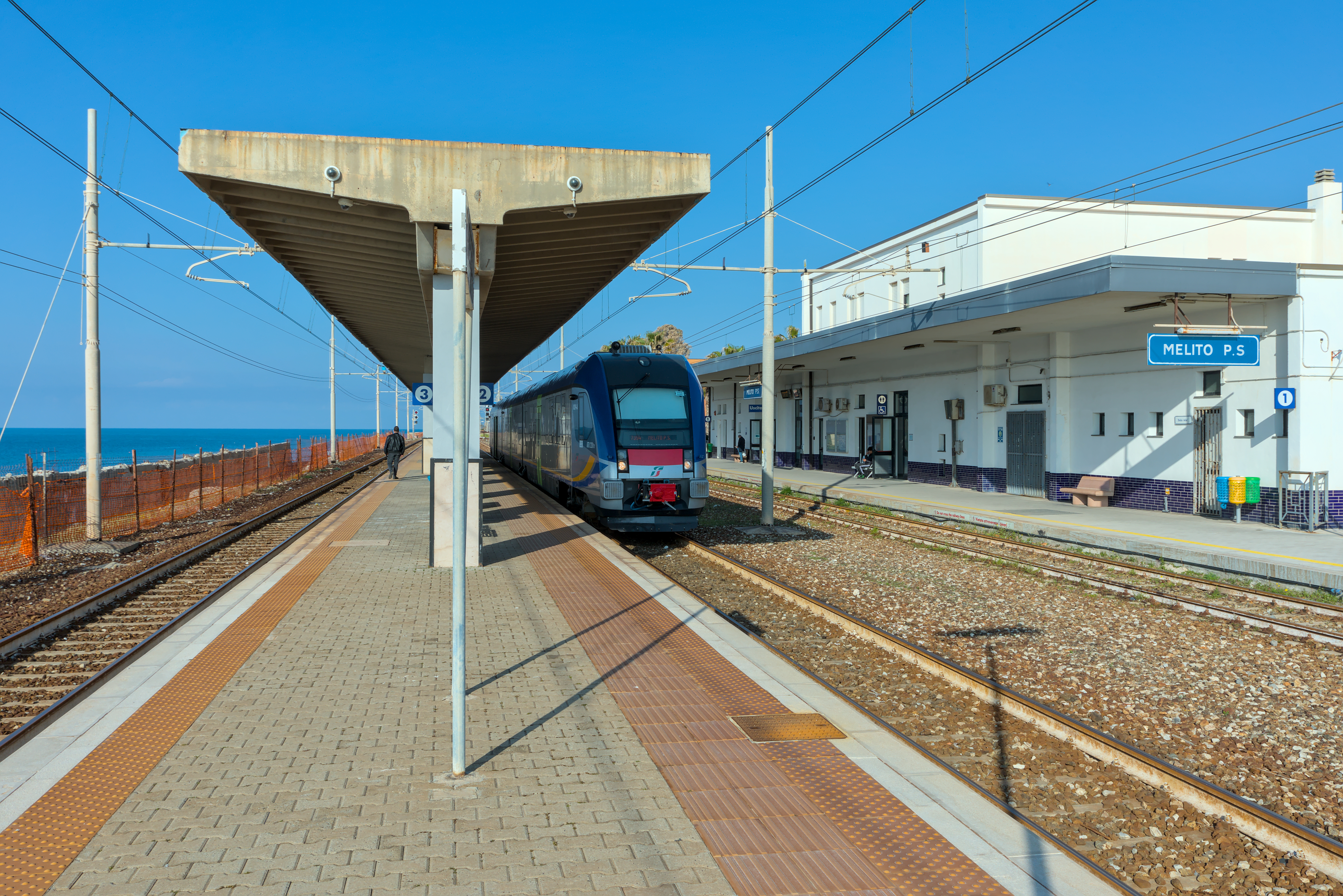
Train station

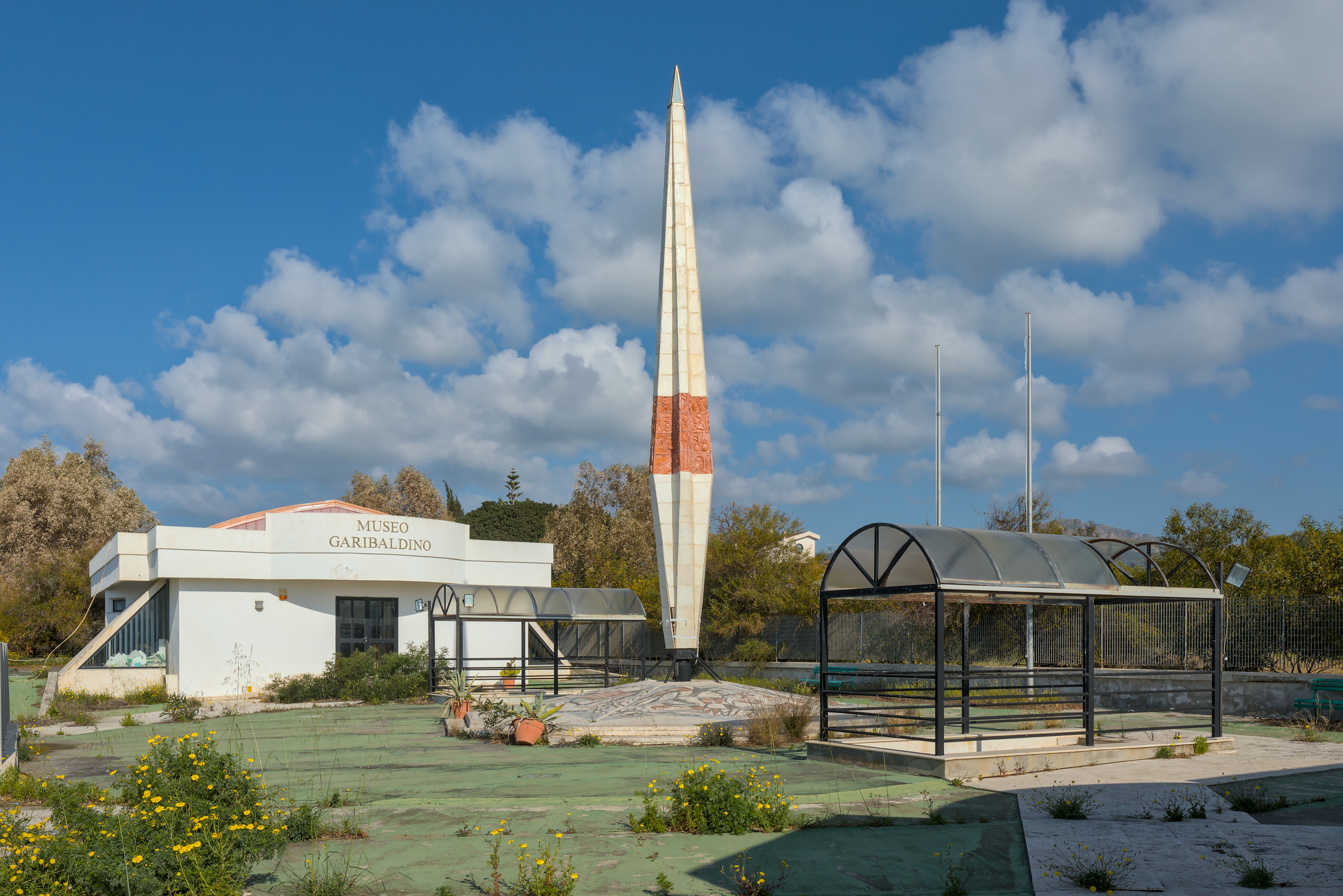
The abandoned Garibaldi museum

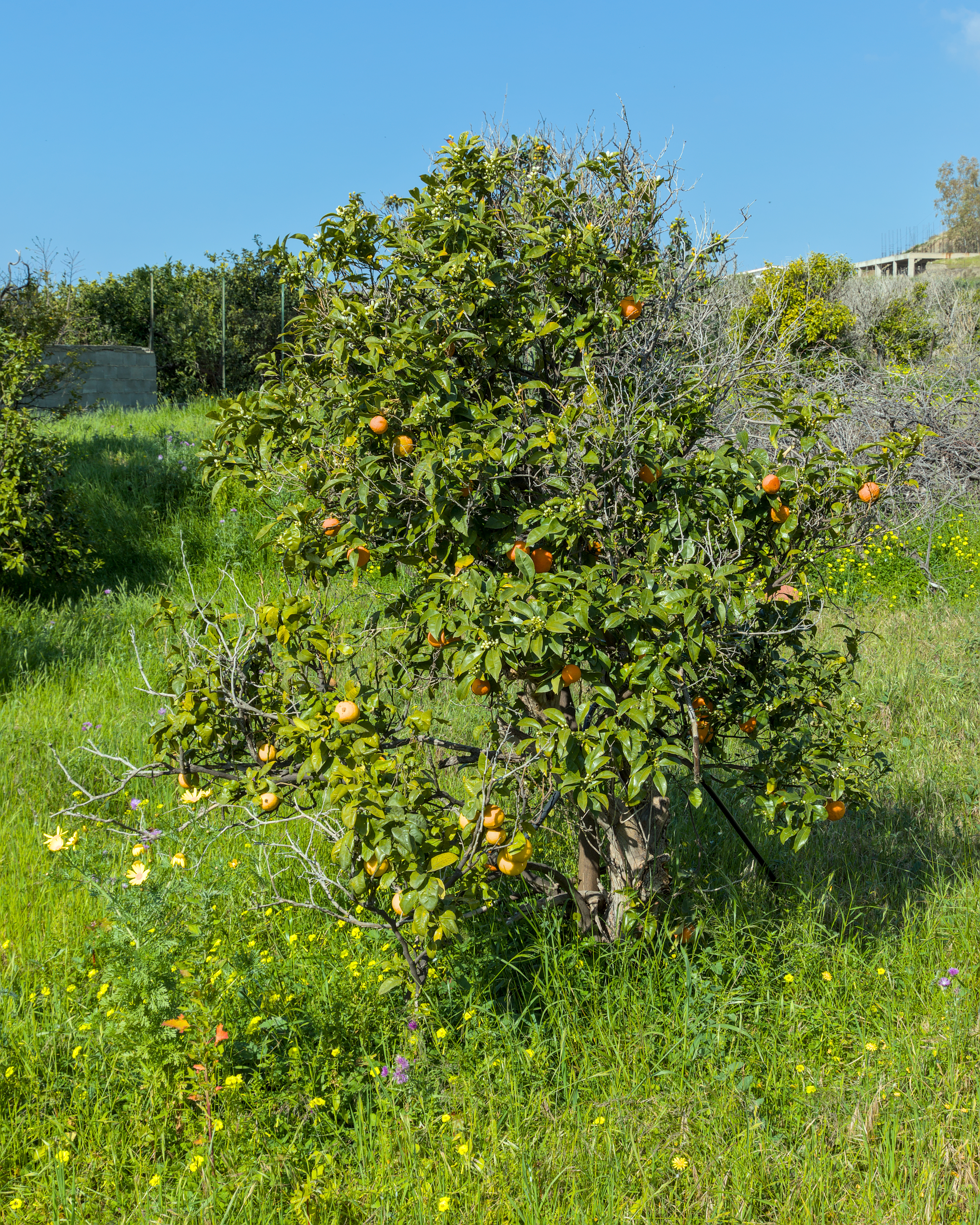
A bergamot tree

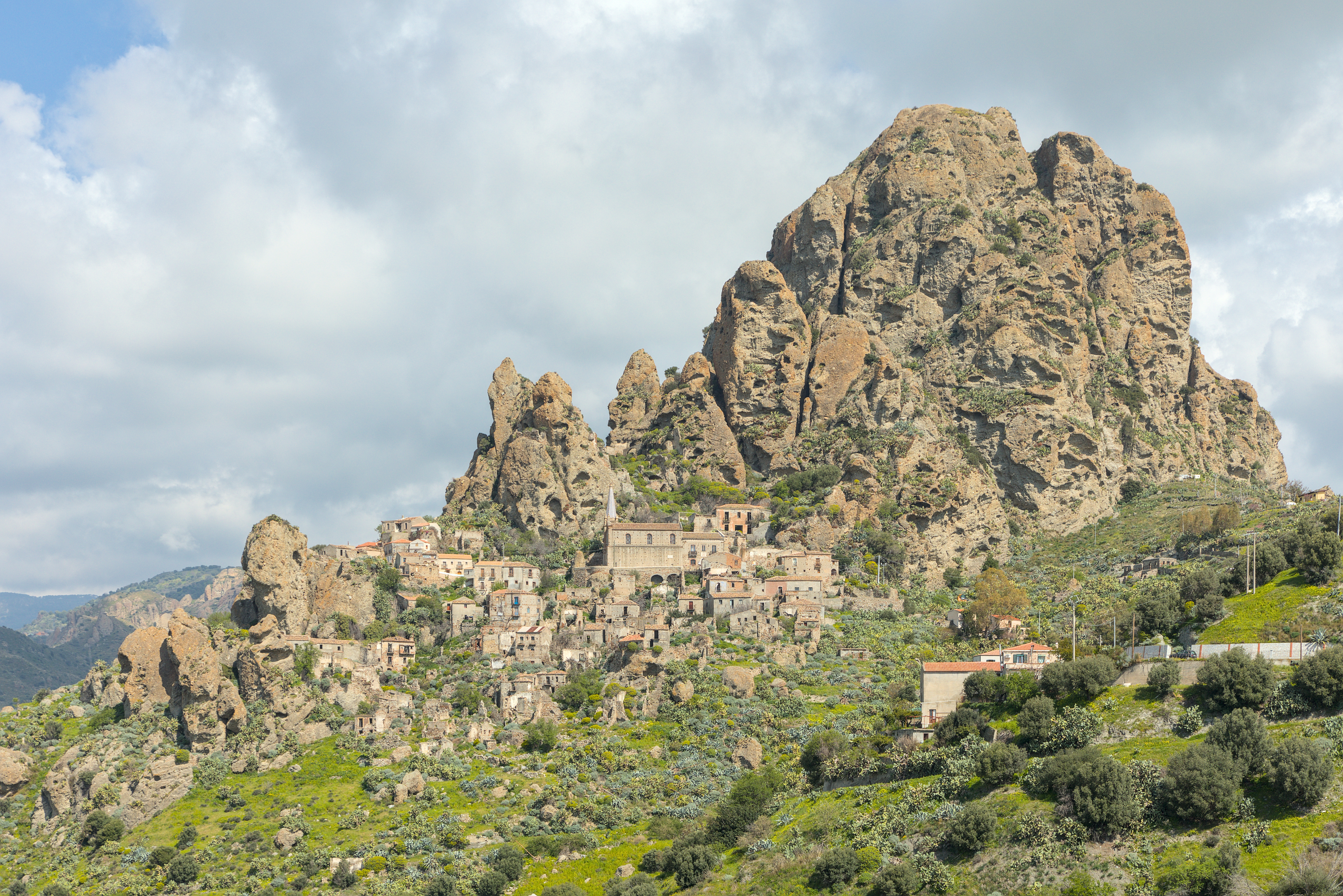
Pentedattilo, an abandoned village in the comune
