= De Stefano =

De Stefano (Italian: [de ˈsteːfano]) is an Italian surname. People with the surname include:

- Francesco De Stefano (born 1999), Italian footballer
- Frank De Stefano (born 1948), Australian politician
- Gildo De Stefano, Italian journalist
- Giorgio De Stefano (died 1977), Italian gangster
- Giorgio De Stefano (born 1948), Italian gangster
- Giulio De Stefano (born 1929), Italian sailor
- Giuseppe De Stefano (born 1969), Italian gangster
- Paolo De Stefano (died 1985), Italian gangster of the De Stefano 'ndrina
- Paolo Rosario De Stefano (born 1976), Italian gangster
- Silvana De Stefano, Italian sculptor
- Victoria de Stefano (1940–2023), Italian-Venezuelan novelist, essayist, philosopher and educator
- Vitale De Stefano (1889–1959), Italian film actor and director
