= Giorgio De Stefano (1948) =

Italian criminal

- Born: 27 November 1948 (age 77); Reggio Calabria, Italy
- Known for: Behind-the-scene power broker
- Allegiance: De Stefano 'ndrina - 'Ndrangheta

Giorgio De Stefano (Italian pronunciation: [ˈdʒordʒo de ˈsteːfano]; born 27 November 1948) is an Italian criminal and a member of the 'Ndrangheta in Calabria, a Mafia-type criminal organisation in Calabria. He belongs to the De Stefano 'ndrina, based in the Archi neighbourhood in the city of Reggio Calabria, and is a cousin of the historical boss Paolo De Stefano. He has a degree in criminal law and is often referred to as "the lawyer". According to anti-mafia investigators, he represents "the brains" of the De Stefano clan, able to elaborate alliances and strategies, with a typically managerial approach, identifying the most lucrative criminal activities to be implemented.

== 'Ndrangheta heritage ==
The De Stefanos would come to prominence as members of the 'Ndrangheta clan of Domenico Tripodo, the old boss (capobastone) of Reggio Calabria, who had acquired considerable financial resources through tobacco smuggling. Within two years (as a result of the First 'Ndrangheta war in 1974-1976) they moved from being simple 'Ndranghetisti to the new "lords" of Reggio Calabria.

The De Stefanos extended their reach beyond the criminal world and entered a Masonic lodge in order to better take care of business and political interests. Giorgio De Stefano was elected for the Christian Democrat party (DC - Democrazia Cristiana) in the city council of Reggio Calabria for many years.

== Second 'Ndrangheta war ==
The De Stefano clan was a protagonist in the Second 'Ndrangheta war, which grouped all the 'ndrine in the city of Reggio Calabria into either one of two opposing factions: the Condello, Imerti, Serraino and Rosmini clans on one side, and the De Stefano 'ndrina, Tegano, Libri and Latella clans on the other. The boss of the clan, Paolo De Stefano, was killed on 13 October 1985.

Paolo’s brother Orazio De Stefano and Giorgio De Stefano took over the leadership of the clan. Both were seen as the main mentors of the "pax mafiosa" that ended the Second 'Ndrangheta war in September 1991. A deal had to be brokered between the main adversaries Pasquale Condello (the Condellos had killed Paolo De Stefano) and Giorgio De Stefano, who wanted the killers of his cousin. Another 'Ndrangheta boss, Domenico Alvaro, had to be called in to mediate.

== Power broker ==
A sharp-witted individual with a diabolic shrewdness, he was described by a pentito as "the true ominous shadow behind all bloody events". Rather than a man of action, he was the example of the behind-the-scene power broker of one of the most powerful 'Ndrangheta clans. He was also friends with Lodovico Ligato, the Christian Democrat politician from Reggio Calabria and former head of the Italian State Railways who was murdered in 1989. Ligato had been elected to parliament in 1979 with a large majority. He had won 80,000 votes thanks to the support of the De Stefano 'ndrina.

While his close ally Giovanni Tegano became a member of La Provincia, a provincial commission of the 'Ndrangheta, formed at the end of the war to avoid further internal conflicts, he was in the care of Giorgio De Stefano. He was allied with bosses of the other Italian crime organizations, such as Leoluca Bagarella and Nitto Santapaola from the Sicilian Mafia, and Raffaele Cutolo from the Camorra.

== Arrests ==
Wanted by the police he became a fugitive and his name was put on the list of most wanted fugitives in Italy. In the 1990s, he was a fugitive in the Mediterranean luxury resort Cap d'Antibes in France – the preferred location of his cousin Paolo. He was arrested in Reggio Calabria on 1 July 1996, while trying to hide in a trunk. At the time he was considered to be the number one of the 'Ndrangheta.

He was released after serving a sentence of three and a half years of imprisonment imposed in 2001 for collusion with organized crime. On 15 March 2016 he was arrested again in a police operation dubbed "Sistemia Reggio" against several 'Ndrangheta clans in the city.

== Secret cupola ==
In July 2016, he received another arrest warrant for being part of a commission, known as the "super cupola" made up of 'Ndrangheta white-collar criminals, that for over a decade decided on political positions and local and regional government positions in Calabria. The power of the commission reached as far the ex-governor of Calabria and former mayor of Reggio Calabria, Giuseppe Scopelliti, and national politicians as Gianni Alemanno involved in the Mafia Capitale investigation. The investigation was dubbed Operation Mammasantissima. According to the police, the secret cupola picked "affiliates to be placed in the Italian parliament", and had a "decisive role" in many "electoral appointments in a municipal, provincial and regional level".
