= Antonio Macrì =

Italian criminal

- Antonio Macrì
- Born: 23 May 1904; Siderno, Kingdom of Italy
- Died: 20 January 1975 (aged 70); Siderno, Italy
- Cause of death: Gun shots
- Other names: Zzi 'ntoni, "Boss of Two Worlds"
- Occupation: Capobastone
- Allegiance: Macrì 'ndrina / 'Ndrangheta

Antonio Macrì (Italian: [anˈtɔːnjo maˈkri]; 23 May 1904 – 20 January 1975), popularly known as Zzi 'Ntoni ("Uncle Tony"), was a historical and charismatic boss of the 'Ndrangheta, a criminal and mafia-type organisation in Calabria, Italy. He was born in Siderno on the Ionian coast of Calabria and was the capobastone (head of command) of the 'ndrine in his hometown.

== Criminal career ==
Antonio Macrì was one of the most powerful bosses belonging to the "old guard". In Siderno he was well known as the true authority in his town. In 1929 he was charged with possession of illegal firearms, in 1932 for grievous bodily harm, in 1945 for robbery with violence, in 1947 for attempted murder, and in 1958 for murder with aggravating circumstances.

Macrì held the position of capo crimine from the beginning of the 1960s until the outbreak of the first 'Ndrangheta war in 1975. Together with Domenico Mico Tripodo, the boss of the city of Reggio Calabria and the surrounding areas, and Girolamo Mommo Piromalli, head of the most powerful 'ndrina on the Tyrrhenian coast, he formed a sort of triumvirate, whose senior position was recognized by all other family chiefs and whose advice was in most cases followed without protest.

He also had close relations with the Sicilian Mafia, in particular with Michele Navarra, at the time the capomafia of Corleone, when Navarra was banished by the Italian authorities to Gioiosa Marina in Calabria in the 1950s. Later he counted Luciano Liggio, Salvatore and Angelo La Barbera, Pietro Torretta and the Grecos among his friends.

Macrì was involved in expanding the local 'Ndrangheta internationally, in particular to Canada and Australia. He urged Michele Racco, who had been initiated to the local 'ndrina and moved to Toronto in the early 1950s, to set up an organisation in Canada. Different clans originally from Siderno formed what has been called the Siderno Group by Canadian law enforcement authorities.

== Tradition and modernization ==
Macrì opposed new criminal activities such as kidnappings and drug trafficking. However, several cosche of Platì, San Luca, and the Gioia Tauro plain did engage in these activities and Macrì had no means to prevent or punish these violations of the traditional mafia code. (Both the crimine and its charismatic leaders depended on the consensus and cooperation of the individual 'Ndrangheta families and relied on the goodwill of single family bosses to have the codes obeyed.)

Nevertheless, Macrì also was a proponent of modernization, representing a qualitative step in expanding traditional parasitic criminal activities of extortion to a more entrepreneurial phase. When in 1974, businesses, involved in the expansion of the port and steelworks in Gioia Tauro, offered a three per cent kickback to be left in peace, the three leading 'Ndrangheta families at the time, Macrì, the Piromalli brothers and the De Stefano brothers, rejected the offer and wanted to be sub-contracted on work carried out in order to control the projects. Nevertheless, the growing tensions among 'Ndrangheta clans reached a boiling point at the meeting to discuss the deal. Tripodo and his former underling Giorgio De Stefano exchanged insults that almost escalated in a violent confrontation, only just prevented by peacemaker Macrì.

== Death ==
Macrì was a traditional 'Ndrangheta capobastone who, together with Tripodo, opposed new developments in the organisation such as the formation of the Santa, a secret society within the 'Ndrangheta established in the early 1970s to maximize the power and invisibility of the most important bosses.

The disagreement led to bloodshed in the so-called First 'Ndrangheta war. On 20 January 1975, Macrì was shot dead in his hometown Siderno, while his right-hand man Francesco Commisso was severely wounded. His death triggered the 'Ndrangheta war that cost some 300 lives. According to a state witness, one of his "executioners" was Pasquale Condello, an ally of Macrì's main foe, the De Stefano 'ndrina. Macrì may have paid for his opposition to kidnappings and drug trafficking with his life, as his murder was presumably organized by the supporters of a change of modus operandi of the 'Ndrangheta.

His son Vincenzo Macrì was sentenced to 20 years in prison in 2018 after being convicted in Locri, Italy, of Mafia association. Prosecutors had originally sought a 30-year-term for Macri, who earlier served 13 years in American prisons for drug trafficking. His sentence was reduced to 15 years after appeal.
