= Vincenzo Macrì =

Italian criminal (born 1965)

- Born: 3 January 1965 (age 61); Siderno, Italy
- Allegiance: 'Ndrangheta

Vincenzo Macrì (born 3 January 1965, Siderno) is a member of the 'Ndrangheta, a criminal and mafia-type organisation in Calabria, Italy. He was born in Siderno on the Ionic coast of Calabria. He is the son of Antonio Macrì, a historical and charismatic boss of the 'Ndrangheta, whose murder in 1975 triggered a 'Ndrangheta war that cost some 300 lives.

== Criminal career ==
Macrì is considered to be one of the main brokers of cocaine for the Commisso 'ndrina in Siderno, in charge of managing the drug trafficking routes between Europe and Latin America. The clan has a branch, the Siderno Group, in the Greater Toronto Area in Canada.

He spent 13 years in prison in the United States of America, since his arrest in Wilmington, (Delaware) on 18 July 1989 with 3 pounds of heroin, by the Federal Bureau of Investigation on charges for international drug trafficking.

== Cocaine trafficking through Aalsmeer ==
With his brother-in-law, Vincenzo Crupi, Macrì was involved in the flower trade in Aalsmeer in the Netherlands, the largest flower auction in the world. In 2005, they set up Fresh BV, a flower business in Aalsmeer, which was a cover for the large scale import of cocaine from Latin America through the Aalsmeer flower auction, according to Prosecutors in Italy. Due to major logistics hubs such as the port of Rotterdam and Schiphol airport, the Netherlands is an important gateway for cocaine smuggling to Europe.

Trucks transporting flowers to Italy used by the group generally transported small amounts, between six and eleven kilograms of cocaine, to avoid damages in case the police intercepted a shipment, police evidence shows. Some shipments, however, could transport up to 100 kilos, for which the group allegedly paid 100,000 euro, according to intercepted communications presented in evidence to a court in Rome.

According to the Brazilian federal police, Macri was part of an international criminal organization that imported and trafficked cocaine and hashish, from Morocco, the Netherlands and the Dominican Republic. The drugs arrived in Italy via shipping containers.

== Arrest and extradition ==
In September 2015, Vincenzo Crupi was arrested in Italy with more than 50 suspects in an operation known as the Acero-Krupy Connection. (In March 2018, Vincenzo Crupi was sentenced to 20 years in prison for international drug trafficking in flower shipments from the Netherlands.)

Macrì became a fugitive, but was arrested at the international airport of São Paulo on 9 June 2017, while on his way to Caracas in Venezuela, where he had been living for some time using a false identity. He was extradited on drug trafficking charges to Italy on 5 June 2018.

According to police investigators, from Caracas Macrì had continued to coordinate purchases and trafficking logistics not only for his clan, but for all of the 'Ndrangheta families that wanted to "invest" in cocaine trafficking, deciding through which supply channels to obtain the drug and the places where to deliver the drug, as well as the modalities of distribution of the profits.
