= Paolo De Stefano =

Italian criminal (1943–1985)

- Paolo De Stefano
- Born: January 24, 1943; Reggio Calabria, Italy
- Died: October 13, 1985 (aged 42); Reggio Calabria, Italy
- Occupation: Capobastone of the De Stefano 'ndrina
- Allegiance: De Stefano 'ndrina / 'Ndrangheta

Paolo De Stefano (Italian pronunciation: [ˈpaːolo de ˈsteːfano]; 24 January 1943 – 13 October 1985) was an Italian mobster and member of the 'Ndrangheta who became the undisputed boss of Reggio Calabria. Together with his brothers Giovanni, Giorgio and Orazio he headed the De Stefano 'ndrina.

== Early years ==
The De Stefano clan hailed from the Archi neighbourhood in Reggio Calabria. Paolo and his brother Giorgio De Stefano went to university for several years. According to the pentito Giacomo Lauro, who held important positions in the Reggio Calabria clans: “In 1970 … the De Stefanos … were nobody, they were nobody. The De Stefano brothers became the owners of Reggio Calabria after the war, the first mafia war. … I do not want to swear, but who the fuck were the De Stefanos in the 1970s? They had killed a certain Sergi for four oxen, for a fraud of four oxen in Modena … These were the De Stefanos. They committed petty fraud for four cows, … then with cigarettes.”

The De Stefano brothers would come to prominence as members of the clan of Domenico Tripodo, the old capobastone of Reggio Calabria, who had acquired considerable financial resources through tobacco smuggling. Within two years (as a result of the First 'Ndrangheta war in 1974–1976) they moved from being simple 'Ndranghetisti to the new "lords" of Reggio Calabria. They won a monopoly of construction work in northern Reggio Calabria, pushing the rival Tripodo group out of the market of public work contracts with the support of the Piromalli and Mammolito cosche. They also robbed a shipment of smuggled tobacco belonging to Tripodo.

Paolo's brother Giovanni De Stefano was killed in 1974 and his other brother Giorgio was wounded. The attack triggered the First 'Ndrangheta war. Tripodo was arrested in February 1975 and incarcerated in the Poggioreale prison in Naples. He was killed with the help of Camorra boss Raffaele Cutolo, the boss of the Nuova Camorra Organizzata (NCO) who worked with the De Stefano's in drug trafficking.

== Political connections ==
The De Stefano brothers had connections with the political right in all its political expressions (that is, from the official party, the Movimento Sociale Italiano, up to the extra-parliamentary movements) and actively supported them in the organisation of the revolt that took place in Reggio Calabria in 1970 against making Catanzaro the regional capital. He also supported prince Junio Valerio Borghese and his plans for a neo-fascist coup. The so-called Golpe Borghese fizzled out in the night of December 8, 1970.

In the second half of the 1970s, he co-founded with Girolamo Piromalli La Santa, a branch of the Italian 'ndrangheta Born with the purpose of establishing permanent contacts between the Freemasonry, the mafia and political world. De Stefano entered in a masonic lodge in order to better take care of business and political interests. His cousin Giorgio De Stefano was prosecuted and jailed for his activity as mediator between the Freemasonry-mafia and a set of prominent Italian politicians.

Paul supported his cousin, the lawyer Giorgio De Stefano, to be elected for the Christian Democrat party (DC - Democrazia Cristiana).

After the First 'Ndrangheta war, De Stefano became one of the undisputed bosses of Reggio Calabria, and attracted significant police attention. He was convicted in the maxi trial against the 'Ndrangheta in 1979 (known as de Stefano+59 trial) and sent into internal banishment, a legal measure to dislodge mafiosi from their home towns. He fled to France and in 1983 he was arrested in Cap d'Antibes on the Côte d'Azur. However, due to pre-arrest bail (Italian: libertà su cauzione), release on ground of health and being a fugitive, he did not spend many days in jail.

== Second 'Ndrangheta war ==
A second 'Ndrangheta war was triggered by the marriage between Giuseppina Condello – the sister of the Condello brothers, underbosses of De Stefano – and Antonio Imerti, the leader of a neighbouring 'ndrina in Villa San Giovanni. The conflict exploded in 1985, two years after the marriage and saw practically all the ‘ndrine in the city of Reggio Calabria grouped into either one of two opposing factions. De Stefano had become fearful of the new alliance that might challenge his power base. A failed attempt on Antonio Imerti triggered the murder of Paolo De Stefano on October 13, 1985, by the brothers Paolo and Domenico Condello. The bloody six-year war between the Condello-Imerti clan and De Stefano allied with the Tegano clan left 621 deaths.

According to the sociologist Pino Arlacchi, the background of the war was the attempt of the De Stefano brothers to turn their accumulated wealth and power to account by claiming contracts for the Gioia Tauro port. The resulting clash with the Piromalli family, whose monopoly this was, half destroyed the De Stefano cosca and left the leader, Paolo De Stefano, dead.

== Succession ==
Paolo’s brother Orazio De Stefano and his cousin, the lawyer Giorgio De Stefano, took over the leadership of the clan. Both were seen as the main mentor of the "pax mafiosa" that ended the Second 'Ndrangheta war. Subsequently, Paolo's son Giuseppe De Stefano became the boss. He was arrested in December 2008. His other son Carmine De Stefano had been arrested in December 2001.

According to prosecutor Salvatore Boemi, De Stefano was the representation of the manager-criminal controlling a crime multinational with joint ventures with Raffaele Cutolo from the Camorra and Nitto Santapaola and Francesco Ferrera from Cosa Nostra in Catania.
