= Paolo Rosario De Stefano =

Member of the 'Ndrangheta

Paolo De Stefano
- Born: 21 December 1976 (age 49); Reggio Calabria, Italy
- Occupation: Crime boss
- Parent: Giorgio De Stefano
- Allegiance: De Stefano 'ndrina / 'Ndrangheta

Paolo Rosario De Stefano (Italian pronunciation: [ˈpaːolo roˈzaːrjo de ˈsteːfano]; born December 21, 1976, in Melito di Porto Salvo) is an Italian mobster and member of the 'Ndrangheta. He has been a fugitive since 2005 and was included on the list of most wanted fugitives in Italy. He is indicted for Mafia association, robbery and extortion.

He belongs to the De Stefano 'ndrina and is the son of the clan's boss, Giorgio De Stefano, who was killed in 1977. In 2007 he was convicted to eight years and four months in prison.

After the arrest in December 2008 of his cousin Giuseppe De Stefano he was next in line to be the boss of the clan.

He was arrested on August 18, 2009, while on holiday with his family at the popular tourist town of Taormina in Sicily.
