= Tegano =

Tegano may refer to:

== People ==
- Giovanni Tegano, Italian gangster
- Pasquale Tegano, Italian gangster

== Places ==
- Tegano, Rennell Island
