= Domenico Tripodo =

Italian mob boss and criminal

- Born: c. 1923; Reggio Calabria, Italy
- Died: August 26, 1976; Poggioreale prison, Naples, Italy
- Cause of death: Stabbed to death
- Other name: Don Mico
- Known for: Boss of the 'Ndrangheta clans in Reggio Calabria
- Allegiance: 'Ndrangheta
- Motive: Power struggle during the First 'Ndrangheta war

Domenico Tripodo (Italian pronunciation: [doˈmeːniko triˈpɔːdo]; c. 1923 − August 26, 1976) was an Italian criminal and a historical and charismatic boss of the 'Ndrangheta dominating the city of Reggio Calabria and the surrounding areas. Also known as Don Mico Tripodo, he was one of the most powerful 'Ndrangheta bosses of his time, held in high respect by his criminal associates.

== Powerful ‘Ndrangheta boss ==
Tripodo rose to power by ousting the old Reggio boss Domenico Strati after a two-year conflict in 1958-59. In the 1960s, he formed a sort of triumvirate with Antonio Macrì, the boss of the city of Siderno and Girolamo Mommo Piromalli, head of the most powerful 'ndrina on the Tyrrhenian coast. The triumvirate’s senior position was recognized by all other family chiefs and its advice was, in most cases, followed without protest.

Tripodo acquired considerable financial resources through tobacco smuggling. He had relations with the Sicilian Mafia and was the "compare d’anello" (a kind of best man and trusted friend) of Mafia boss Totò Riina at his wedding in 1974. According to Enzo Ciconte, a specialist on the 'Ndrangheta and a consultant for the Antimafia Commission, that would only be possible if they were considered to be of the same rank.

== Leadership challenged ==
Don Mico was a traditional 'Ndrangheta capobastone who, together with Macrì, was opposed to new developments in the organisation such as the entry into kidnapping and drug trafficking, as well as the formation of the Santa, a secret society within the 'Ndrangheta established in the early 1970s to maximize the power and invisibility of the most important bosses.

Tripodo was opposed by his former underbosses in Reggio, the De Stefano brothers. They won a monopoly of construction work in northern Reggio Calabria, moving the rival Tripodo group out of the market of public work contracts with the support of the Piromalli and Mammolito clans. They also robbed a shipment of smuggled tobacco belonging to Tripodo. The various disagreement led to bloodshed in the First 'Ndrangheta war, which took place in 1974-76. Tripodo tried to strike first, killing Giovanni De Stefano in 1974.

== Arrest and death ==
Tripodo did not see the end of the conflict. He was arrested on February 21, 1975, and incarcerated in the Poggioreale prison in Naples. On August 26, 1976, he was stabbed to death in prison on the request of the De Stefano crime family with the help of Camorra boss Raffaele Cutolo, the boss of the Nuova Camorra Organizzata (NCO) who worked with the De Stefanos in drug trafficking. Paolo De Stefano emerged as the new leader of the Reggio Calabria 'Ndrangheta.

After the defeat, his son Carmelo Tripodo first moved to north Italy, later to Caserta in Campania, and finally in 1992 to Fondi in Lazio. He allied himself with the Calabrian Imerti-Condello clan, historical enemies of the De Stefanos. He was arrested on October 30, 1996, in Rome on charges of extortion and usury.
