= Domenico Condello =

- Born: 4 November 1956 (age 69); Reggio Calabria, Italy
- Other name: Micu 'u pacciu
- Allegiance: 'Ndrangheta

Domenico Condello (Italian pronunciation: [doˈmeːniko konˈdɛllo]; 4 November 1956), also known as Micu 'u pacciu ("Micu the madman"), is an Italian criminal belonging to the 'Ndrangheta, a Mafia-type criminal organisation in Calabria.

== Criminal history ==
Born in the Archi neighbourhood of Reggio Calabria, he was a fugitive from 1993, wanted for criminal association, murder and drugs and arms trafficking, for which he has been convicted to a life sentence. He was arrested on 10 October 2012. Before his arrest, he was on the list of most wanted fugitives in Italy.

He was convicted for the murder of Paolo De Stefano in 1985, the boss of a rival clan, during the Second 'Ndrangheta war, a bloody six-year conflict (1985–1991) between the Condello-Imerti clan and De Stefano-Tegano clan. With his brother Paolo Condello he was arrested in January 1988 for the killing of De Stefano. He was sentenced to life, but was released in November 1990 because the terms of his pretrial detention expired before the appeal.

His cousin Pasquale Condello, the undisputed leader of the clan, was arrested in February 2008, and Domenico probably succeeded him as boss.

== Personal life ==
He has two children with his companion Margherita Tegano. She was arrested in March 2012, together with Condello's cousins Caterina and Giuseppa Condello and 15 others, for obstructing Condello's arrest. The concealed microphones and video cameras used by police investigators in the operation revealed relations of the Condello clan with various business figures, such as brothers Giulio, Giuseppe and Francesco Lampada, originally from Reggio Calabria but long established in Milan.
