= Pasquale Tegano =

Italian criminal

- Born: 14 January 1955 (age 71); Reggio Calabria, Italy
- Allegiance: De Stefano-Tegano 'ndrina / 'Ndrangheta

Pasquale Tegano (Italian pronunciation: [paˈskwaːle teˈɡaːno]; born 14 January 1955, in Reggio Calabria) is an Italian criminal and a member of the 'Ndrangheta, a Mafia-type criminal organisation in Calabria. He was a wanted figure from 1994 and included in the list of most wanted fugitives in Italy, until his arrest on 6 August 2004.

With his brother Giovanni Tegano, he is considered to be one of the bosses of the De Stefano-Tegano 'ndrina. The clan hails from the Archi neighbourhood in the city of Reggio Calabria. He has been sentenced to life imprisonment for murder, extortion and mafia association.

== Second 'Ndrangheta war ==
The Tegano clan sided with the De Stefano clan in the Second 'Ndrangheta war, which raged from 1985 to 1991. The alliance was sealed by the marriage between Orazio De Stefano and Antonietta Benestare, a niece of Giovanni Tegano, on 2 December 1985. The bloody six-year war between the Condello-Imerti clan and De Stefano allied with the Tegano clan, left 621 deaths.

While the main leaders of the De Stefano clan were killed, it fell upon the Teganos to wage the war. The Teganos were the key negotiators for the 'pax mafiosa' in Reggio Calabria in the 1990s between the Tegano, De Stefano, Libri and Latella clans on one side and the Imerti, Serraino, Condello and Rosmini clans on the other, in which they divided their spheres of influence in Reggio Calabria.

== Fugitive and arrest ==
He became a fugitive in 1994 and was arrested on 5 August 2004. At that time, differences between the Tegano clan and the De Stefanos emerged over the division of extortion rackets. The Teganos secured the neutrality of their old enemy Pasquale Condello.

== Books ==
- (in Italian) Gratteri, Nicola & Antonio Nicaso (2006). Fratelli di Sangue, Cosenza: Luigi Pellegrini Editore ISBN 88-8101-373-8
- Paoli, Letizia (2003). Mafia Brotherhoods: Organized Crime, Italian Style, New York: Oxford University Press ISBN 0-19-515724-9 (Review by Klaus Von Lampe) (Review by Alexandra V. Orlova)
