= De Stefano 'ndrina =

- Founding location: Reggio Calabria, Italy
- Years active: 1970s-present
- Territory: Reggio Calabria in Calabria; Milan, Bergamo and Brescia in Lombardy; Ramifications also in Tuscany, Emilia-Romagna and Liguria.
- Ethnicity: Calabrians
- Allies: First 'Ndrangheta war (1974-76): Piromalli 'ndrina Second 'Ndrangheta war (1985-1991): Libri 'ndrina and Latella 'ndrina
- Rivals: First 'Ndrangheta war (1974-76): Domenico Tripodo and Antonio Macrì; Second 'Ndrangheta war (1985-1991): Condello, Imerti, Serraino 'ndrina and Rosmini 'ndrina

The De Stefano 'ndrina, or the De Stefano family or De Stefano-Tegano family, is one of the most powerful clans of the 'Ndrangheta, a criminal and mafia-type organisation in Calabria, Italy. The 'ndrina hailed from the Archi neighbourhood in Reggio Calabria. Several of its members were included in the list of most wanted fugitives in Italy.

The De Stefano 'ndrina has strong ramifications throughout Italy, particularly in Milan, Brescia, and Bergamo in Lombardy, but also in Tuscany, Emilia-Romagna, and Liguria.

== Origins ==
The De Stefano brothers, Paolo, Giovanni, Giorgio and Orazio would come to prominence as members of the 'Ndrangheta clan of Domenico Tripodo, the old boss (capobastone) of Reggio Calabria, who had acquired considerable financial resources through tobacco smuggling. Within two years (as a result of the first 'Ndrangheta war in 1974-1976) they moved from being simple 'Ndranghetisti to the new "lords" of Reggio Calabria.

Before that time the clan had not been very prominent, according to the pentito Giacomo Lauro, who held important positions in the Reggio Calabria clans. "In 1970 … the De Stefanos … were nobody, they were nobody. The De Stefano brothers became the owners of Reggio Calabria after the war, the first mafia war. … I do not want to swear, but who the fuck were the De Stefanos in the 1970s? They had killed a certain Sergi for four oxen, for a fraud of four oxen in Modena … These were the De Stefanos. They committed petty fraud for four cows, … then with cigarettes."

== Rise to power ==
Tripodo was a traditional 'Ndrangheta boss who was opposed to new developments in the organisation as well as the formation of the Santa, a secret society within the 'Ndrangheta established in the early 1970s to maximize the power and invisibility of the most important bosses. The members were eager to modify the traditional rules of the 'Ndrangheta in order to enter the public work market and start illegal activities such as drug trafficking, which were prohibited by the traditional code but promised to be very profitable. Through the membership of covert Masonic lodges, the 'Ndrangheta bosses were able to contact law enforcement authorities, judges and politicians that were necessary to gain access to public work contracts.

The De Stefanos, however, were more modern and the differences led to conflicts. Paolo De Stefano became a member of La Santa and the De Stefanos won a monopoly of construction work in northern Reggio Calabria, moving the rival Tripodo group out of the market of public work contracts with the support of the Piromalli and Mammoliti 'ndrine. They also robbed a shipment of smuggled tobacco belonging to Tripodo.

== First 'Ndrangheta war ==
These innovations and the institution of La Santa were opposed by the more traditionalist chiefs like Tripodo and Antonio Macrì. Only at the end of the so-called First 'Ndrangheta war, which took place in 1974-76 and led to the deaths of Macrì and Tripodo as well as the rise of the Piromalli 'ndrina and the De Stefano brothers as the new leaders of the Reggio Calabria 'ndrine, was the new institution fully recognized.

The war started with an attack on the brothers Giorgio, Paolo and Giovanni De Stefano in the Roof Garden bar in Reggio Calabria in November 1974 ordered by Tripodo. Giovanni was killed while the eldest of the brothers – and the boss of the clan – Giorgio was wounded. Tripodo was arrested in February 1975 and incarcerated in the Poggioreale prison in Naples. He was killed with the help of Camorra boss Raffaele Cutolo, the boss of the Nuova Camorra Organizzata (NCO) who worked with the De Stefano’s in drug trafficking.

== Political connections ==
The De Stefano brothers had connections with the political right in all its political expressions – that is, from the official party, the Italian Social Movement (MSI), up to the extra-parliamentary movements – and actively supported them in the organisation of the revolt that took place in Reggio Calabria in 1970 against making Catanzaro the regional capital. They also supported prince Junio Valerio Borghese and his plans for a neo-fascist coup. The so-called Golpe Borghese fizzled out in the night of December 8, 1970, however.

The De Stefanos entered in a Masonic lodge in order to better take care of business and political interests. The lawyer Giorgio De Stefano, a cousin of the boss Paolo, was elected for the Christian Democracy party (DC) in the city council of Reggio Calabria for many years, and Paolo Romeo, a member of Parliament for the Italian Democratic Socialist Party (PSDI) for several legislatures. They were also close to Lodovico Ligato, a Christian Democrat politician from Reggio Calabria and the former head of the Italian State Railways. He was killed by rival 'Ndrangheta groups in August 1989 in a dispute about bribes over public contracts.

== Business interests ==
In 1974, when businesses involved in the expansion of the port and steelworks in Gioia Tauro offered a three per cent kickback in order to be left in peace, the three leading 'Ndrangheta families at the time, Antonio Macrì, the Piromalli brothers and the De Stefano brothers rejected the offer and wanted to be sub-contracted on work carried in order to control the project.

The 'Ndrangheta exploited the construction of the steelworks until the project was abandoned when the government decided there was no economic base for it. In 1977 disagreements about business interests emerged between Piromalli and the De Stefano clan. A hit squad headed by Giuseppe "Peppe" Piromalli killed Giorgio De Stefano. Some 1,000 people were killed in clan wars over the construction contracts.

Paolo took over the leadership of the clan. In the 1980s, the De Stefano brothers controlled virtually the entire wholesale meat market of Reggio Calabria. They forced butchers and supermarkets, through intimidation and threats, to buy meat from their companies.

== Second 'Ndrangheta war ==
A second 'Ndrangheta war was triggered by the marriage between Giuseppina Condello – the sister of the Condello brothers, underbosses of De Stefano – and Antonio Imerti, the leader of a neighbouring 'ndrina in Villa San Giovanni. The conflict exploded in 1985, two years after the marriage and saw practically all the 'ndrine in the city of Reggio Calabria grouped into either one of two opposing factions. De Stefano had become fearful of the new alliance that might challenge his power base. A failed attempt on Antonio Imerti triggered the murder of Paolo De Stefano on October 13, 1985.

The De Stefano clan prepared itself for the fight through another marriage, between Orazio De Stefano, Paolo's younger brother, and Antonietta Benestare, niece of the old boss Giovanni Tegano. Celebrated on December 2, 1985, the wedding sealed the alliance between the De Stefanos and the powerful Tegano clan. The bloody six-year war between the Condello-Imerti clan and De Stefano allied with the Tegano clan caused 621 deaths.

According to the sociologist Pino Arlacchi, the background of the war was the attempt of the De Stefano brothers to turn their accumulated wealth and power to account by claiming contracts for the Gioia Tauro port. The resulting clash with the Piromalli 'ndrina, whose monopoly this was, half destroyed the De Stefano cosca and left the clan leader, Paolo De Stefano, dead.

According to prosecutor Salvatore Boemi, the De Stefanos were the representation of the manager-criminal controlling a crime multinational with joint ventures with Raffaele Cutolo from the Camorra and Nitto Santapaola and Francesco Ferrera from Cosa Nostra in Catania.

== Succession ==
Paolo’s brother Orazio De Stefano and his cousin, the lawyer Giorgio De Stefano, took over the leadership of the clan. Both were seen as the main mentor of the “pax mafiosa” that ended the Second 'Ndrangheta war. The different clans divvied up the different extortion rackets over commercial activities in Reggio Calabria and managed to keep the peace among each other. Giorgio De Stefano was arrested on July 1, 1996. He maintained contacts with mafiosi from Sicily and Campania, in particular Leoluca Bagarella, Raffaele Cutolo, and Nitto Santapaola. From his law office in Rome, he also had contacts with the Banda della Magliana.

Orazio was arrested on February 22, 2004. Subsequently, Paolo’s son Giuseppe De Stefano became the boss. He was arrested in December 2008. His brother Carmine De Stefano had been arrested in December 2001. The next in line was Paolo Rosario De Stefano, a son of Giorgio. He was arrested on August 18, 2009. According to investigators, Giorgio De Stefano represents "the brains" of the De Stefano clan, able to elaborate alliances and strategies, with a typically managerial approach, identifying the most lucrative criminal activities to be implemented. On March 15, 2016, he was arrested again, together with Dimitri De Stefano, the youngest son of Paolo De Stefano, in a police operation dubbed "Sistemia Reggio" against several 'Ndrangheta clans in the city.

Giorgio De Stefano was part of a commission, known as the "super cupola" made up of 'Ndrangheta white-collar criminals, that for over a decade decided on political positions and local and regional government positions in Calabria. The power of the commission reached as far the ex governor of Calabria and former mayor of Reggio Calabria, Giuseppe Scopelliti, and national politicians as Gianni Alemanno involved in the Mafia Capitale investigation. The investigation was dubbed Operation Mammasantissima. According to the police, the secret cupola picked "affiliates to be placed in the Italian parliament", and had a "decisive role" in many "electoral appointments in a municipal, provincial and regional level".

== Leadership ==
- Giorgio De Stefano — Killed on 7 November 1977.
- Paolo De Stefano — Killed on 13 October 1985.
- Orazio De Stefano — Arrested in February 1987.
- Giorgio De Stefano, known as "L'Avvocato" (the lawyer). — Arrested on 1 July 1996.
- Giovanni Tegano — Arrested in 2010, died in prison in 2021.
- Pasquale Tegano — Arrested in 2004, currently in prison.
- Giuseppe De Stefano — Arrested in 2008.
- Paolo Rosario De Stefano — Arrested in 2009.
