= Giorgio De Stefano =

Member of the 'Nrangheta (1941-1977)

- Born: July 15, 1941; Reggio Calabria, Kingdom of Italy
- Died: November 7, 1977 (aged 36); Reggio Calabria, Italy
- Occupation: Crime boss
- Allegiance: De Stefano 'ndrina / 'Ndrangheta

Giorgio Carmelo De Stefano (Italian pronunciation: [ˈdʒordʒo de ˈsteːfano]; (Reggio Calabria, July 15, 1941 - Santo Stefano in Aspromonte, November 7, 1977 ) was an Italian mobster and high-ranking boss of the 'Ndrangheta, a Mafia-type criminal organisation in Calabria. Together with his brothers Paolo, Giovanni and Orazio he headed the De Stefano 'ndrina.

== Criminal career ==
Capobastone of the De Stefano 'ndrina, Giorgio De Stefano was among the protagonists of the First 'Ndrangheta war which raged from 1974 to 1976, allied with the Piromalli brothers against the "old" 'Ndrangheta of Antonio Macrì and Domenico Tripodo — the latter being the former boss of the De Stefano brothers, who under Giorgio managed to break off from his control and become the most important criminal family in Reggio Calabria. During the war he survived an assassination attempt by hitmen loyal to Tripodo, inside the Roof Garden bar in Reggio Calabria, which led to the death of his brother Giovanni. Tripodo would later be killed in prison by men loyal to Raffaele Cutolo, who acted on the behalf of the De Stefano brothers.

Giorgio De Stefano became victorious in the First 'Ndrangheta war (which caused 233 deaths), and inaugurated, together with other 'ndrine from Reggio Calabria and its province, a new period for the 'Ndrangheta thanks to new lucrative businesses (most notably drug trafficking) and links to the political-institutional world, as well as the formation of the Santa, a secret society within the 'Ndrangheta established in the early 1970s to maximize the power and invisibility of the most important bosses. The Santa allowed the 'Ndrangheta to enter lucrative public contracts.

== Downfall ==
After the war Giorgio De Stefano had become extremely powerful (he had links with Cosa Nostra, politics, neo-fascist terrorists and others and was constantly expanding his influence. The other 'ndrine began fearing for their businesses and so decided to kill him. By extorting a bribe of a building contractor already under the protection of the Piromalli's, De Stefano had committed a sgarro (insulting the honour and authority of a crime boss).

On 7 November 1977 Giorgio De Stefano was lured to a supposed meeting on Santo Stefano in Aspromonte and there he was killed by a simple soldier, Giuseppe Suraci, who was later killed in revenge and had his head taken literally on a silver plate to Giorgio's brother Paolo De Stefano to appease him. 'Ndrangheta bosses Giuseppe Piromalli and Rocco Musolino were indicted as being responsible for the murder of Giorgio De Stefano, but were later acquitted for lack of evidence.
