= Commisso 'ndrina =

Criminal organisation

- Founded: 1930s
- Founder: Antonio Macrì
- Named after: Cosimo Commisso
- Founding location: Siderno, Calabria, Italy
- Years active: 1930s–present
- Territory: Siderno and Locride in Calabria; Greater Toronto in Canada; State of New York in the United States.
- Ethnicity: Calabrians
- Criminal activities: Racketeering, drug trafficking, money laundering, extortion
- Allies: Piromalli 'ndrina Pesce 'ndrina: Secondigliano Alliance; Contini clan; Licciardi clan; Mallardo clan; Latin American drug cartels
- Rivals: Costa 'ndrina Independent Soldiers; Rizzuto crime family

The Commisso 'ndrina (Italian: [komˈmisso, ˈkɔmmisso]) is a powerful clan of the 'Ndrangheta, a criminal and mafia-type organization in Calabria, Italy. The 'ndrina is based in Siderno, but also has a branch in the Greater Toronto Area in Canada as part of the Siderno Group. The Commisso clan is involved in international drug trafficking using family ties in Italy and Canada.

== In Siderno ==
Girolamo Commisso was a sgarrista in the 'Ndrangheta in the Gioiosa Ionica neighbourhood of Siderno, making him a mid-ranking figure, until his murder in 1948. Girolamo Commisso left behind a widow and three sons, Rocco Remo, Cosimo and Michele, who vowed to avenge their father. In 1961, the Commisso brothers moved to Canada, settling in Toronto, but did not forget their father's murder. The murder of Girolamo Commisso was never solved, but it was believed to have been the work of two assassins, Salvatore Scarfo and Michale Alberti, both of whom fled to Argentina afterwards.

Siderno was the fiefdom of Antonio Macrì, the undisputed boss at the time. In January 1975, Macrì was killed in the First 'Ndrangheta war. His right-hand man – who was wounded in Macrì's killing – was Francesco Commisso, known as "Cicciu I quagghia" ("the quail"). At Macrì's death, his successor was his nephew Vincenzo Macrì, known as u Baruni , who became the head of the locale Siderno. But his succession did not last long. Very soon another young man distinguished himself for charisma, Cosimo Commisso, son of the aforementioned Francesco Commisso, Antonio Macrì's shoulder guard, who assumed command of the locale Siderno, making the 'ndrina Commisso, the family that today bears his name, one of the most influential in the 'Ndrangheta. Giuseppe Commisso (u mastru) was also an influential figure in Siderno. In 1982, Alberti returned to Siderno and was promptly murdered while eating at the patio terrace of a restaurant. Amongst the patrons were a dozen men from Toronto with links to the Commisso brothers. One of the men present at the Gourmet, Vincenzo "Jimmy" DeLeo, upon his return to Canada visited the Commisso brothers being held at the Kingston penitentiary; he denies that he discussed with them the murder of the man who was believed to have killed their father.

In the 1980s, the Commisso were challenged by the Costa 'ndrina over the command of Siderno. The feud began with Luciano Costa's murder in January 1987, after he was suspected of breaking into the home of the leader of the Commissos, stealing weapons, and then urinating on his bed. By 1991, the feud – that spilled over to Toronto as well – ended in a victory for the Commisso clan. Officially, there were 28 dead among the Costas and eight among the Commissos. Cosimo Commisso was sentenced over the vendetta, and his cousin Antonio Commisso, also known as l'avvocatu ("the lawyer"), succeeded him as the acting boss of the clan.

The Commissos are one of the 'Ndrangheta's biggest and most important clans, involved in the global cocaine business and money laundering. They were members of Camera di controllo, a provincial commission of the 'Ndrangheta formed at the end of the Second 'Ndrangheta war in September 1991, to avoid further internal conflicts. The Commissos are known to have links with the Secondigliano Alliance, considered by the authorities the most powerful Camorra group that is still active. Both organizations are allied in the trafficking and sale of cocaine and marijuana from South America, via the Netherlands.

In 1993, Cosimo Commisso "Quagghia" was arrested, and later convicted of five murders and three attempted murders between May 1989 and July 1991, and sentenced to life imprisonment in 1998. After 26 years in prison, on 9 January 2019, the Court of Appeal of Naples acquitted Commisso in a review process "for not having committed the offense", releasing him immediately. On 13 December 2019, Commisso was arrested in the "Core Business" operation, accused of mafia association for the period in which he was under house arrest since 2015 in Perugia. On 30 January 2020, Commisso was definitively acquitted of the murders by the Supreme Court of Cassation.

On 9 August 2019, several former Greater Toronto Area residents were arrested in Calabria, including Francesco Commisso and Rocco Remo Commisso. By that time, police in Italy and in Canada were convinced that "the 'Ndrangheta's Canadian presence has become so powerful and influential that the board north of Toronto has the authority to make decisions, not only in relation to Canada's underworld, but also abroad, even back in Siderno".

== In Canada ==
The three Commisso brothers arrived in Toronto in 1961, but the police first began to pay attention to them in 1970 when Rocco Remo Commisso was accused of using intimidation to win orders for a bakery owned by one of his uncles. The Commisso brothers were at first associated with the Toronto 'Ndranghetisti Michele "Mike" Racco, but moved closer to another 'Ndranghetisti Rocco Zito during the 1970s. Zito was known as an advocate of closer ties with the Montreal underworld, a stance shared by the Commisso brothers, while Racco wanted to keep a distance from the Montreal underworld. Racco sat on the Camera di Controllo, the board that governed 'Ndrangheta activities in Toronto, making him one of the most important 'Ndranghetisti in Canada. During visits to his hometown of Siderno in 1971 and again in 1972, Rocco Remo was the target of assassination attempts, being fired upon during both visits. By 1976, Cosimo Commisso was considered by the police to be a capo bastone (underboss) in the Siderno group.

By the end of the 1970s, the Commissos had put together a criminal enterprise that "rivalled the best of the Sicilian Mafia structures existing in the United States and which was, in terms of pure muscle and audacity, one of the most powerful mafia groups in Canada". They "controlled a criminal organization that imported and distributed heroin with the Vancouver mob and the Calabrian Mafia in Italy, fenced stolen goods across North America, printed and distributed counterfeit money throughout Canada and the United States, ran a vast extortion network in Ontario, arranged insurance and land frauds in the Toronto area, and engaged in contract killings and contract-enforcement work across Canada and the United States – the whole gamut of violent criminal activities one usually associates with the Mafia".

The Satan's Choice MC hitman Cecil Kirby, who worked for Cosimo Commisso in Canada from 1976–81, wrote in his 1986 autobiography Mafia Enforcer: "Cosimo wasn't tough-he was homicidal. He'd kill you as soon as you were looking at him if he thought you were crossing him, if he thought it was good for business, or if he thought you insulted him or his family. The lives of other people meant nothing to him".

In the 1980s, the Buffalo crime family also operated in Toronto and Hamilton, and hired Kirby to kill Paul Volpe and his driver Pietro Scarcella in an arrangement with Rocco Remo and Cosimo Commisso, for $20,000. However, the plot was foiled when Kirby turned Royal Canadian Mounted Police informant. Volpe, who had a reputation for being devious and treacherous, had involved the Commissos in a real estate deal and cheated them, causing them to vow vengeance. During a conversation on 31 March 1981, Commisso told Kirby that he needed the approval of an unnamed higher authority before he could give the orders to kill Volpe. When Kirby asked, "What about Volpe?", Commisso replied: "I'm waiting for an answer, OK?" On 23 April 1981, Commisso told Kirby that Scarcella could not be killed until he received permission from the unnamed authority, but he had the approval to kill Volpe. Commisso stated: "Ah, Scarcella, forget about it for now. Just don't worry about it for now", leading Kirby to ask "For how long?". Commisso replied: "A month, two months, we don't know yet. There's another guy". When Kirby asked "What the fuck is going on?", Commisso answered: "There's another guy I want you to take care of instead of him." Wearing a wire, Kirby went to the house of Rocco Remo Commisso on 16 May 1981 to tell him: "Volpe, he's dead...I just killed him an hour ago". In fact, Volpe and his wife were in hiding at the RCMP's Toronto office. Commisso asked for proof that Kirby had indeed killed Volpe, leading him to produce Volpe's wallet with his driver's license in it, which Kirby said he had taken from his corpse. After looking over the wallet, Commisso was finally satisfied that Kirby had killed Volpe. After complaining that he should not have come to his house, Commisso paid Kirby $1,000, and said he would have more money for him soon. Commisso repeatedly assured Kirby that he and his brothers "would take care" of him. In organized crime, excessive displays of affection and loyalty are often a sign that those displaying the sympathy are in fact planning to kill the seeming object of their affection, and Kirby was disturbed by the number of times Commisso told him that he was almost family to him and his brothers.

As a result of Kirby's testimony, Rocco Remo and Cosimo Commisso were convicted of conspiracy to murder, counselling to commit murder, possession of property obtained by crime, conspiracy to commit extortion, counselling another person to commit an indictable offence, causing bodily harm, and conspiracy to commit fraud, and sentenced to 14 and a half years and 21 years in prison, respectively. Michele Commisso was also convicted of conspiracy to commit murder and sentenced to two and a half years in prison. The judge who sentenced the Commisso brothers in 1982, Justice Gregory Evans, stated: "This is a gangster case. It is a contract killing case and we can feel little clemency or mercy with those involved in this case." During his time at the Kingston penitentiary, Rocco Remo worked in the prison library and was considered to be one of the more well-read and intelligent prisoners at Kingston. Cosimo was paroled in 1989.

Antonio Commisso was first arrested in 1999 in Italy. While awaiting appeal, he regularly had to report to police, was subject to a strict night-time curfew, and was prohibited from leaving town. On April 15, 2004, Commisso was definitively convicted and sentenced to seven years and 10 months for Mafia association and trafficking in weapons. When police arrived at his home to arrest him, he was nowhere to be found. On 14 May 2004, he presented himself to the Canadian immigration officials at Montréal–Trudeau International Airport, and the Canadian authorities had no choice but to admit him because he had been granted permanent residency status in Canada in 1974, when he was 18. According to the Siderno police force, "the criminal minds of Siderno are in Canada". After being on the list of most wanted fugitives in Italy, living in Canada for more than a year, Antonio Commisso was arrested at his residence on 28 June 2005 in Woodbridge, Ontario, on an extradition warrant issued in Canada at the request of the Italian government. The federal government was already taking steps to have Commisso permanently deported from the country.

In April 2014, Cosimo Commisso was linked to Laborers' International Union of North America Local 183 as an advisor through his brother Michele (Michael) and nephew Giomino. He was arrested in September 2017 on international fraud charges, but were dropped two months later. Antonio Coluccio of Richmond Hill, Ontario was one of 29 people named in arrest warrants in Italy in September 2014. Police said they were part of the Commisso 'ndrina. In July 2018, Coluccio was sentenced to 30 years in prison for corruption in Italy. His two brothers were already in prison due to Mafia-related convictions.

On 28 June 2018, Cosimo Ernesto Commisso, of Woodbridge, Ontario and his female companion were shot and killed in the early morning. According to sources contacted by the Toronto Star, "Commisso was related to "The Quail" of Siderno, Italy, who has had relations in Ontario, is considered by police to be a "'Ndrangheta organized crime boss". The National Post reported that Cosimo Ernesto Commisso, while not a known criminal, "shares a name and family ties with a man who has for decades been reputed to be a Mafia leader in the Toronto area".

== In the United States ==
According to an investigation that came to light in February 2026, coordinated by the Reggio Calabria District Anti-Mafia Prosecutor’s Office and conducted by the ROS Carabinieri in collaboration with the FBI, the Commisso 'ndrina maintains a stable and structured presence in the United States, particularly in the State of New York.

The investigation reconstructed the operability of the ’ndrangheta in New York, describing it not as a set of disconnected cells but as a projection of a unified organizational model rooted in Siderno. The structure operating abroad is presented as part of the same chain of command as the “house-mother,” maintaining shared hierarchies, rules, and strategic cohesion. A central figure in the United States is Frank Albanese, a resident of Albany, New York. He is described as the head of the foreign projection of the Commisso 'ndrina, particularly of the Locale and the “crimine” of Siderno. According to the prosecutorial reconstruction, Albanese serves as a stable link between Siderno and the external articulations, ensuring the exchange of information between leaders and associates and supervising the 'ndrina’s activities in the United States. He also maintains constant relations with top representatives active in Canada and has the possibility of proposing the affiliation of ’ndrangheta members residing in North America.

The investigation describes Albanese as firmly established in Albany, “with the body abroad but the mind constantly in Siderno,” emphasizing that his weight abroad has meaning only if the command chain in Calabria remains stable. He reportedly stayed in Italy multiple times between 2019 and 2025 for daily organizational commitments, participating in meetings and discussions with top leaders of the Commisso 'ndrina to define his role and represent the organization’s interests abroad.

== Bibliography ==
- Edwards, Peter; Auger, Michel (2012), The Encyclopedia of Canadian Organized Crime: From Captain Kidd to Mom Boucher, McClelland & Stewart, ISBN 978-0771030499
- Edwards, Peter; Nájera, Luis (2021), The Wolfpack The Millennial Mobsters Who Brought Chaos and the Cartels to the Canadian Underworld, Toronto: Random House of Canada, ISBN 9780735275409
- (in Italian) Gratteri, Nicola & Antonio Nicaso (2006). Fratelli di Sangue, Cosenza: Luigi Pellegrini Editore ISBN 88-8101-373-8
- Kirby, Cecil; Renner, Thomas C. (1986). Mafia Enforcer: The Inside Story of a Canadian Biker, Hitman, and Police Informer. Toronto: Methuen. ISBN 0458804401.
- Schneider, Stephen (2009). Iced: The Story of Organized Crime in Canada, Mississauga (Ontario): John Wiley and Sons, ISBN 0-470-83500-1
