= Tony Vallelonga =

Australian politician

Domenicantonio Cosimo "Tony" Vallelonga JP (born 28 November 1946 in Nardodipace, Calabria, Italy) is an Australian property developer and former mayor. He was mayor of the City of Stirling in Perth, Western Australia between 1997 and 2005.

== Early life ==
Vallelonga was born in Calabria, Italy in 1946 and emigrated to Australia in his mid-teens in March 1963 on the SS Oceania.

== Public life ==
Vallelonga was elected to the Osborne ward of the City of Stirling in 1988, until leaving council in 2005. He served four terms as mayor between 1997 and 2005.

In 2009 Vallelonga was made an Honorary Freeman of the City of Stirling.

Vallelonga was also a trustee of the Channel 7 Telethon Trust, a children's charitable foundation.

== Mafia allegations ==
In March 2011 an arrest warrant was issued by an Italian prosecutor alleging that Vallelonga was linked to 'Ndrangheta member Giuseppe Commisso. Vallelonga has denied any wrongdoing.
