= Museo della 'ndrangheta =

Coordinates: 38°03′25″N 15°40′43″E

The Museum of 'Ndrangheta in Reggio Calabria (Calabria) was founded in December 2009 and is located in a mansion confiscated from organized crime.

== History ==
The idea to found a museum about the 'Ndrangheta came into force through the signature of an agreement among the prefecture of Reggio Calabria, the Calabria Region, the province of Reggio Calabria, the Municipality of Reggio Calabria, the ethnology professorship of the Sapienza University of Rome and the arts faculty of Literature and Philosophy of the University of Calabria.

== Purposes ==
The museum is a cultural undertaking dealing with research, scientific analysis, planning, carrying out activities and events on the field with the aim of building an objective knowledge of the spread mind-set where the organized crime takes root.

The main goal is therefore coming to terms, with rationality and awareness, and intervening on the passing on of values which shape the new generations, by acting on the processes of transferring a culture from a generation into another one both directly and indirectly.
