= Giovanni Tegano =

Italian criminal (1939–2021)

- Mugshot of Giovanni Tegano
- Born: 8 November 1939; Reggio Calabria, Italy
- Died: 7 July 2021 (aged 81); Opera, Lombardy, Italy
- Status: Deceased
- Allegiance: De Stefano-Tegano 'ndrina / 'Ndrangheta
- Penalty: Life imprisonment

Giovanni Tegano (Italian pronunciation: [dʒoˈvanni teˈɡaːno]; 8 November 1939 – 7 July 2021) was an Italian criminal and a member of the 'Ndrangheta, the Calabrian mafia. He was a fugitive since 1993 and was included in the list of most wanted fugitives in Italy, until his arrest in April 2010. He was convicted and sentenced to life imprisonment for murder, arms trafficking, and mafia association.

He was considered to be the boss of the De Stefano-Tegano 'ndrina. The clan hails from the Archi neighbourhood in the city of Reggio Calabria, and also includes his brothers Pasquale and Giuseppe. At the time of his arrest in April 2010, Tegano was regarded as one of the few remaining bosses of the 'Ndrangheta's old guard.

== Second 'Ndrangheta war ==
The Tegano clan sided with the De Stefano clan in the Second 'Ndrangheta war, which raged from 1985 to 1991. The alliance was sealed by the marriage between Orazio De Stefano and Antonietta Benestare, a niece of Giovanni Tegano, on 2 December 1985. The bloody six-year war between the Condello-Imerti clan and De Stefano, allied with the Tegano clan, caused 621 deaths.

While the main leaders of the De Stefano clan were killed, it fell upon the Teganos to wage the war. The Teganos were the key negotiators for the 'pax mafiosa' in Reggio Calabria in the 1990s between the Tegano, De Stefano, Libri, and Latella clans on one side and the Imerti, Serraino, Condello and Rosmini clans on the other, in which they divided their spheres of influence in Reggio Calabria. He became a member of Camera di Controllo, a provincial commission of the 'Ndrangheta, formed at the end of the war in September 1991 to avoid further internal conflicts.

== Fugitive, arrest and death ==
He became a fugitive in 1993. His brother Pasquale Tegano, on the run since 1994, was arrested on 6 August 2004. At that time, differences between the Tegano clan and the De Stefanos emerged over the division of extortion rackets. The Teganos secured the neutrality of their old enemy Pasquale Condello.

After being on the run for 17 years, he was arrested in Reggio Calabria on 26 April 2010. Tegano did not resist arrest, though he had a loaded gun with him. The next day, a group of friends, relatives and supporters applauded when he left the Reggio Calabria court house on his way to jail. "Giovanni is a man of peace!" one woman shouted. The Italian Minister of the Interior, Roberto Maroni, commented that "his capture is the hardest blow that we could inflict today to the 'Ndrangheta as he was the number one Calabrian fugitive." "Given his role, seniority and the importance of events he knew, he had risen to the ranks of one of the 'Ndrangheta's most important figures," according to a top police official, Renato Cortese.

Giovanni Tegano died on 7 July 2021 in the prison of Opera, Lombardy, at the age of 81. Until his death, Tegano was detained under the 41 bis regime because he was still considered the leader of the powerful De Stefano-Tegano 'ndrina.
