= Giuseppe De Stefano =

- Born: December 1, 1969 (age 56); Reggio Calabria, Italy
- Occupation: Crime boss
- Parent: Paolo De Stefano
- Status: Incarcerated
- Allegiance: De Stefano 'ndrina / 'Ndrangheta

Giuseppe De Stefano (Italian pronunciation: [dʒuˈzɛppe de ˈsteːfano]; born 1 December 1969, in Reggio Calabria) is an Italian criminal and a member of the 'Ndrangheta, the Calabrian mafia. He was a fugitive from 2003 until his capture on 10 December 2008, in his hometown Reggio Calabria. He was arrested in an apartment in the centre of Reggio Calabria, accompanied by his wife and children. He was unarmed and did not resist arrest. During his time on the run he was included in the list of most wanted fugitives in Italy.

He is the son of 'Ndrangheta boss Paolo De Stefano, who was murdered in 1985, and he is considered to be one of the highest-ranking leaders of the 'Ndrangheta. He has been sentenced in absentia to 18 years in prison on charges of drug trafficking and 30 years for membership of a criminal organisation.

He had taken over the leadership of the De Stefano 'ndrina after the arrest of his father's brother Orazio De Stefano in February 2004. His elder brother Carmine De Stefano had been arrested in December 2001.
