= Silvana De Stefano =

Italian sculptor and architect

Silvana De Stefano is an Italian sculptor and architect.

== Biography ==
Born in Naples, she moved to Rome where at the Accademia di Belle Arti, she learnerd from Pericle Fazzini and Greco learning sculpture and Toti Scialoja on painting. She graduated in 1986 in Architecture at La Sapienza-Università degli Studi.

She assisted the post-graduate lectures on urban planning engineering and architecture at the Università degli Studi in Rome. In 1989, she won a scholarship from the CNR (National Counsel on Research) at the University of California, Berkeley. She settled in California, dedicating herself to sculpture and painting.

In 1992, she moved to New York City where she met gallery owner Leo Castelli who suggested she organize a solo exhibition at his West Broadway Art Gallery. She postponed the exhibition when she accepted a commission by the Finmeccanica to work on an installation at company headquarters in Rome. During the process of setting up this installation, which the artist entitled "Movements", Castelli assisted De Stefano, visiting her in Rome.

In 1998, commissioned by SACE, she created a sculpture called "Suspended Column", within SACE headquarters.

In 2001, within an architectural and interior design project, she transformed an old factory into her home and study and which aroused interest in the architecture world. Magazines reviewed it: Mercedes (2004), Architectural Digest Italy, Architectural Digest Mexico (2009 cover story), Compasses Architecture & Design (2008), Mercedes-Benz Magazine (2011). The converted space is used for filmmaking and television. Several films and shows were shot there.

In 2002, she drew the Manifesto for UNESCO Italian National Commission.

In 2004, she co-curated a painting exhibition within the 14th century refectory of Palazzo Venezia with Claudio Strinati. De Stefano focused on organizing the exhibition.

In 2006, for the introduction of the new Alfa Romeo Brera, she created a solo exhibition at the Spazio Etoile -Fondazione Memmo entitled "Personale di Silvana De Stefano".

In 2008/2009, she got involved with a project of artistic interventions for the internal revamping of residential buildings in Milan.

In 2009, she planned a project for the Expo 2009 for the town of Warsaw, Poland and also carried out the sculpture/installation "Elements" in Milan.

== Main projects ==
- 1994: Installation "Movements", Palazzo di Vetro (Giò Ponti), Finmeccanica headquarters, Rome
- 1998: Installation "Suspended Column", Palazzo Poli, Sace headquarters, Rome
- 2002: Manifesto for UNESCO Italian National Commission
- 2004: Exhibition "Spazio-Luce", Palazzio Venezia, Rome
- 2006: Exhibition at the "Spazio Etoile", Fondazione Memmo, Rome
- 2008: Two artistic interventions for the internal revamping of residential buildings, Milan
- 2009: Project planning for the Expo 2009, Warsaw, Poland
- 2009: Sculpture/installation "Elements", Milan
- 2009: Workshop on innovation, Bnlparibas, Rome

== Design ==
The architect/sculptor carried out interior design projects in both Italy and US.

The artist converted living/working space was mentioned in:

- Mercedes 2004 "La rivista delle idee in movimento"
- Compasses, Dubai, 2008, Architecture & Design Magazine
- AD Architectural Digest, 2009, Italian edition (US interior design magazine distributed across the globe)
- AD Architectural Digest, 2009, International edition
- Mercedes-Benz, 2011 Fashion Style & Design
