= Pasquale Condello =

Italian criminal (born 1950)

- Mugshot of a young Pasquale Condello
- Born: 24 September 1950 (age 76); Reggio Calabria, Italy
- Other name: Il supremo
- Status: Imprisoned since 2008
- Allegiance: 'Ndrangheta
- Penalty: Life imprisonment

Pasquale Condello (Italian pronunciation: [paˈskwaːle konˈdɛllo]; born 24 September 1950) is an Italian criminal known as a member of the 'Ndrangheta, a Mafia-type organisation in Calabria, southern Italy. He is also known as Il supremo ("the supreme one") for his role at the top of the crime syndicate. He was a fugitive and included in the list of most wanted fugitives in Italy from 1990 until his capture in February 2008. Investigators called him the "Provenzano of Calabria" – a reference to Bernardo Provenzano, the Sicilian "boss of bosses" who was arrested in 2006 after some 40 years as a fugitive.

== Criminal career ==
Initially Condello was aligned with Paolo De Stefano, the undisputed boss of Reggio Calabria, who was the best man at his wedding.

Condello was probably involved in the killing of the historical and charismatic 'Ndrangheta boss Antonio Macrì from Siderno – who tried to stop the crime syndicate drifting into kidnapping and drug running and opposed the establishment of the Santa – on 20 January 1975. According to a state witness, Condello was one of his 'executioners'. The murder unleashed the First 'Ndrangheta war that cost some 300 lives, including Domenico Tripodo, the historical boss of Reggio. At the end of the conflict De Stefano was the new leader of Reggio Calabria 'Ndrangheta.

== Second 'Ndrangheta war ==
A second 'Ndrangheta war was triggered by the marriage between Giuseppina Condello – the sister of the Condello brothers, underbosses of De Stefano – and Antonio Imerti, the leader of a neighbouring 'ndrina in Villa San Giovanni. The conflict exploded in 1985, two years after the marriage and saw practically all the 'ndrine in the city of Reggio Calabria grouped into either one of two opposing factions. De Stefano had become fearful of the new alliance that might challenge his power base. A failed attempt on Antonio Imerti triggered the murder of Paolo De Stefano on 13 October 1985. His brothers Paolo and Domenico Condello were arrested in January 1988 for killing De Stefano, for which Pasquale has been charged as well.

The bloody six-year war between the Condello-Imerti clan and De Stefano, allied with the Tegano clan, left 600 deaths. The conflict was settled with the help of other 'Ndrangheta bosses. Antonio Nirta, head of the San Luca locale vouched for the De Stefanos, while Antonio Mammoliti vouched for the Condello-Imerti clan. Condello became a member of Camera di Controllo, a provincial commission of the 'Ndrangheta formed at the end of the war in September 1991, to avoid further internal conflicts.

== Criminal enterprise ==
Condello is accused of running a network of extortion and kickbacks on public works contracts, as well as having gotten control of contracts worth hundreds of millions of euros to build water purifiers in some Calabrian towns. He is regarded as a key figure in trafficking cocaine between Colombia and Italy. He has been sentenced in absentia to four life prison terms - plus another 22 years in jail - for murder, mafia association, extortion, money laundering and drug-related offences, including the killing of Lodovico Ligato, a Christian Democrat politician and former head of the Italian State Railways in 1989.

Arrested in 1988, he jumped a US$100,000 bail in 1990 after being let out of prison under leniency rules which have since been changed. In March 1993, he was arrested together with his brother-in-law and alleged superior boss Antonio Imerti. However, newspaper reports already mentioned that Condello might have surpassed his former boss – and speculated that he might have killed Imerti when they both were still fugitives. He managed to get released from detention again and became a fugitive.

== Arrest ==
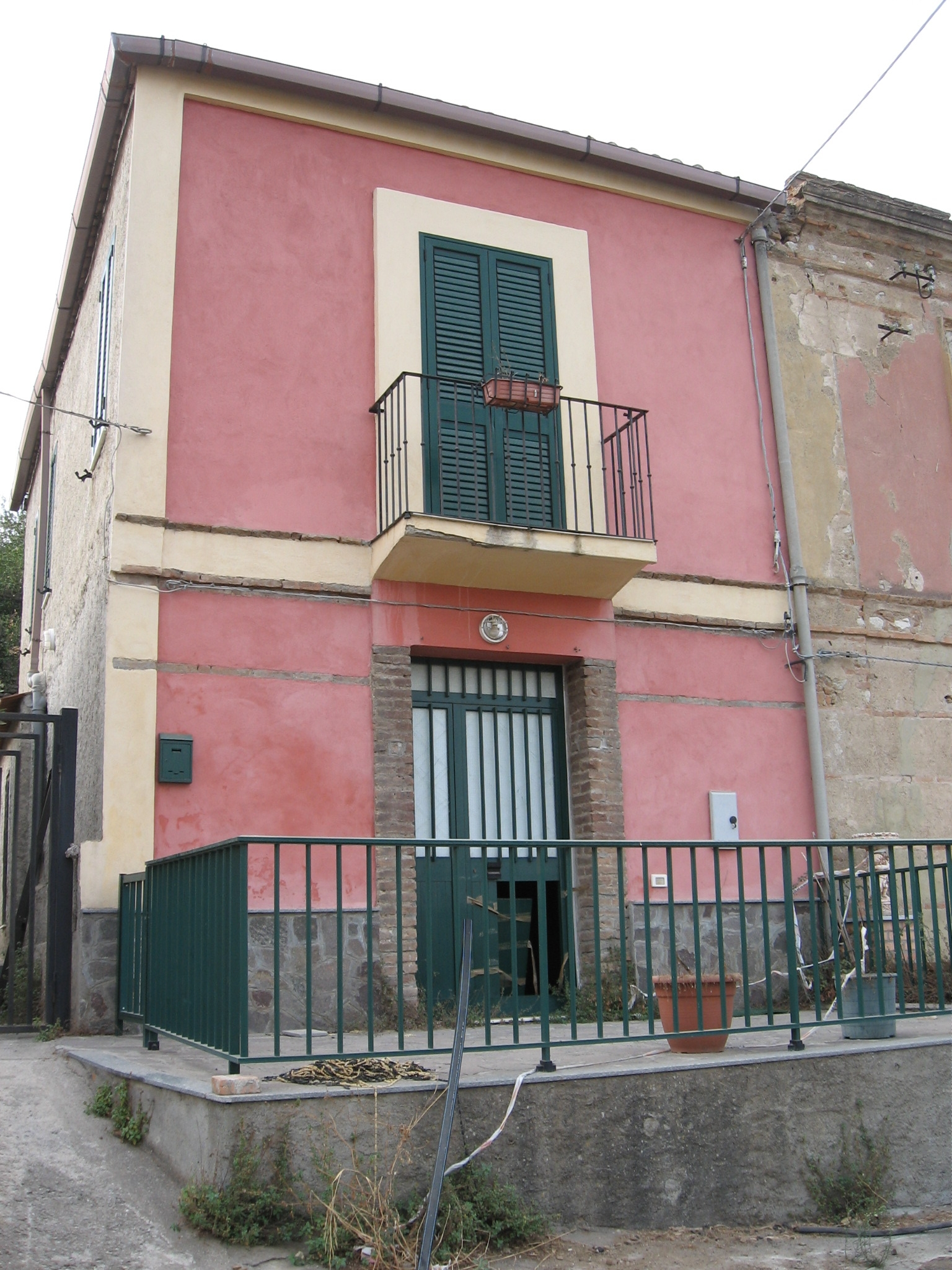
The house where Condello was arrested in February 2008 in Occhio di Péllaro.

On 18 February 2008, Condello was captured in a major operation involving over 100 policemen who converged on an apartment in the district of Occhio di Péllaro, on the outskirts of Reggio Calabria. Although he was armed, he did not resist arrest and "behaved like a true, old-style boss", ordering his underlings to hold their fire. He was taken into custody without a struggle, police said. He had been trailed for days and was found in the company of his son-in-law and a nephew.

Investigators said that Condello had remained in his native Reggio Calabria throughout his time on the run and from there ran his gang's operations not only in Calabria but also in Rome and other Italian cities. According to police sources, Condello owns real estate and businesses worth more than 54 million euros in Rome and other Italian cities.

== Family life ==
He is married with Maria Morabito and has two daughters and a son. Caterina Condello married Daniele Ionetti, the son of Alfredo Ionetti, considered to be the treasurer of the Condello clan.

== Books ==
- Paoli, Letizia (2003). Mafia Brotherhoods: Organized Crime, Italian Style, New York: Oxford University Press ISBN 0-19-515724-9 (Review by Klaus Von Lampe) (Review by Alexandra V. Orlova)
