= First 'Ndrangheta war =

Internal conflict in Italian criminal organisation

- Traditional 'Ndrangheta boss Antonio Macrì, killed 20 January 1975
- Date: 1974–1977
- Location: Calabria, Italy
- Caused by: Struggle over public contracts and restructuring of the 'Ndrangheta
- Result: Rise of the De Stefano 'ndrina and consolidation of Piromalli 'ndrina

Parties
Antonio Macrì 'ndrina; Domenico Tripodo 'ndrina; Commisso 'ndrina	De Stefano 'ndrina; Piromalli 'ndrina; Cataldo 'ndrina; Mazzaferro 'ndrina

Lead figures
Antonio Macrì; Domenico Tripodo	Giorgio De Stefano

Casualties
- Deaths: 233 people were killed on both sides

The First 'Ndrangheta war was an internal struggle in the 'Ndrangheta, a Mafia-type criminal organisation in Calabria (southern Italy). The conflict raged from 1974 to 1977 and resulted in approximately 233 deaths. The war broke the equilibrium in the triumvirate, made up of Antonio Macrì, Domenico Tripodo and Girolamo Piromalli, that had ruled the 'Ndrangheta for 15 years, and facilitated the rise of a new generation 'Ndranghetisti, in particular the De Stefano 'ndrina, who wanted to involve the 'Ndrangheta in new, more lucrative criminal activities (especially drug trafficking).

== Background ==
Traditional 'Ndrangheta bosses such as Domenico Tripodo and Antonio Macrì were opposed to new developments in the organisation, such as the entry into kidnapping and drug trafficking. They also opposed the formation of the Santa, a secret society within the 'Ndrangheta, established in the early 1970s to maximize the power and invisibility of the most important bosses.

By contrast, Girolamo Piromalli, their fellow boss in the triumvirate that had ruled the 'Ndrangheta for 15 years, favoured La Santa and was eager to modify the traditional rules of the 'Ndrangheta through the formation of covert Masonic lodges in which the 'Ndrangheta bosses were able to contact law enforcement authorities, judges and politicians that were necessary to access public work contracts in the state development of the Reggio Calabria area (a railroad stump, a steelwork center, and the port in Gioia Tauro).

At a meeting in September 1974, in Gioia Tauro, hosted by Piromalli to discuss an offer of a 3 per cent kick back by the major construction companies for the Goia Tauro steelworks (which the 'Ndrangheta bosses rejected), tensions reached a boiling point. Tripodo and his former underling Giorgio De Stefano exchanged insults that almost escalated in a violent confrontation, only prevented by peacemaker Macrì. Matters deteriorated when Tripodo, fearing an ambush, failed to show up at a wedding of a close ally of Piromalli.

== The conflict ==
Tripodo tried to strike first, killing Giovanni De Stefano and wounding his brother Giorgio De Stefano on 24 November 1974, in the Roof Garden bar, an infamous 'Ndrangheta haunt in Reggio Calabria. The conflict was now inevitable. In retaliation, on 20 January 1975, Macrì was killed in his hometown Siderno while his right hand man Francesco Commisso was severely wounded. According to a state witness, a young Pasquale Condello, an ally of the De Stefanos, was one of his 'executioners'. Macrì was killed with the help of the Cataldo and Mazzaferro clans.

Tripodo was arrested on 21 February 1975, and incarcerated in the Poggioreale prison in Naples. On 26 August 1976, he was stabbed to death in prison on the request of the De Stefanos with the help of Camorra boss Raffaele Cutolo, the boss of the Nuova Camorra Organizzata (NCO) who worked with the De Stefanos in drug trafficking.

With the killing of Tripodo, the conflict withered to its end. However, the final stage was the killing of Giorgio De Stefano on 7 November 1977 in Santo Stefano in the Aspromonte. He was killed by Giuseppe Suraci, apparently out of personal vengeance, but in reality on the orders of Piromalli, who feared the rise of the De Stefanos. By extorting a bribe of a building contractor already under the protection of the Piromallis, De Stefano had committed a sgarro (insulting the honour and authority of a crime boss).

=== Casualties ===
The conflict resulted in 233 deaths in three years. Apart from the main war, local feuds erupted in various towns such as Cittanova, Seminara, Ciminà and Taurianova. Victims were sometimes fed to the pigs to make the bodies disappear.

== Aftermath ==
The De Stefano clan moved from being simple 'Ndranghetisti to being the new "lords" of Reggio Calabria. They won a monopoly of construction work in northern Reggio Calabria, moving the rival Tripodo group out of the market of public work contracts with the support of the Piromalli and Mammoliti cosche. Their dominant position would be challenged in the second 'Ndrangheta war (1985–1991).

The real winner, however, was the Piromalli 'ndrina who redirected the 'Ndrangheta clan from its rural base to an entrepreneurial criminal organisation assuming dominance over several public works in the Gioia Tauro area, particularly in the construction and operation of the new container seaport.

== See also ==
- Second 'Ndrangheta war

== Sources ==
- Arlacchi, Pino (1988). Mafia Business. The Mafia ethic and the spirit of capitalism, Oxford: Oxford University Press ISBN 0-19-285197-7
- Dickie, John (2013). Mafia Republic: Italy's Criminal Curse. Cosa Nostra, 'Ndrangheta and Camorra from 1946 to the Present, London: Sceptre ISBN 978-1-444-72640-4
- (in Italian) Gratteri, Nicola & Antonio Nicaso (2006). Fratelli di Sangue, Cosenza: Luigi Pellegrini Editore ISBN 88-8101-373-8
- (in Italian) Guarino, Mario (2004). Poteri segreti e criminalità. L'intreccio inconfessabile tra 'ndrangheta, massoneri a apparati dello stato, Bari: Edizioni Dedalo ISBN 88-220-5340-0
- Paoli, Letizia (2003). Mafia Brotherhoods: Organized Crime, Italian Style, Oxford/New York: Oxford University Press ISBN 0-19-515724-9 (Review by Klaus Von Lampe) (Review by Alexandra V. Orlova)
