= Cosca =

Sicilian Mafia crime family

A cosca (Italian: [ˈkɔska]; pl. cosche in Italian and coschi in Sicilian), in Sicily, is a clan or Sicilian Mafia crime family led by a capo.

The equivalent in the 'Ndrangheta in Calabria is the 'ndrina.

== Etymology ==
A cosca is the crown of spiny, closely folded leaves on plants such as the artichoke or the thistle, which symbolizes the tightness of relationships between mafiosi.
