= Siderno =

Siderno Greek: Sidérno
- Comune
- Città di Siderno
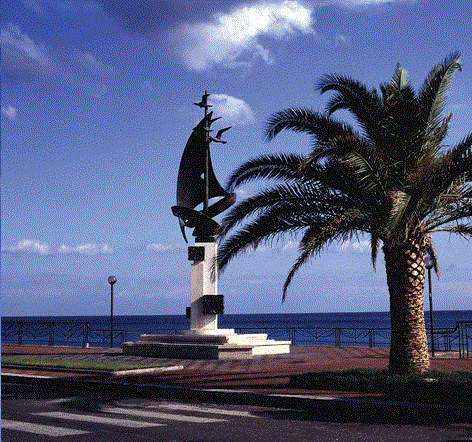
- Monument to the Seaman in Siderno.

- Coat of arms

- Location within Italy Location within Calabria
- Coordinates: 38°16′N 16°18′E
- Country: Italy
- Region: Calabria
- Metropolitan city: Reggio Calabria (RC)
- Frazioni: See list

Government
  - Mayor: Mariateresa Fragomeni (PD)

Area
  - Total: 31 km^{2} (12 sq mi)
- Elevation: 4 m (13 ft)

Population (31 March 2018)
  - Total: 18,187
  - Density: 590/km^{2} (1,500/sq mi)
- Demonym: Sidernesi
- Time zone: UTC+1 (CET)
  - Summer (DST): UTC+2 (CEST)
- Postal code: 89048
- Dialing code: 0964
- Patron saint: Maria SS. di Porto Salvo
- Saint day: September 8
- Website: Official website

Siderno (Calabrian: Sidernu or Siderni; Greek: Σιδέρνο, romanized: Sidérno) is a town and comune in the Metropolitan City of Reggio Calabria, Calabria, southern Italy, about 3 kilometres from Locri.

Siderno Marina is the newer town located on the Ionian coast. It is a destination for both Italian and foreign tourists and has a bathing beach.

Siderno Superiore is the old town, higher up on the flank of the coastal mountain range, featuring narrow streets and old buildings. It has historic palaces, such as the 17th century Palazzo Falletti, Palazzo Calautti, and Palazzo Correale-Santacroce (known for a sculpture depicting three human faces). It also is home to several religious buildings such as the Church of Saint Mary of Portosalvo, Siderno; Santa Maria dell’Arco; and San Nicola di Bari. It is near the historic Palazzo De Mojà, a Spanish-era residence, recently restored. The population of Siderno Superiore has largely relocated to the Marina which offers more job opportunities and services.

== History ==
The early history of the town is unknown. The old town in the hilly inland was probably founded in the 10th century by some people from Locri, who had fled to the area to defend themselves from Saracen incursions; in the following century it became a hamlet of the county of Grotteria and was home to various feudal lords. Siderno Marina was built along the coast after the 1783 earthquake.

== Climate ==
Climate data for Siderno (1961-1990)
Month	Jan	Feb	Mar	Apr	May	Jun	Jul	Aug	Sep	Oct	Nov	Dec	Year
Mean daily maximum °C (°F)	15.2 (59.4)	15.8 (60.4)	17.3 (63.1)	20.2 (68.4)	24.6 (76.3)	29.4 (84.9)	32.7 (90.9)	33.0 (91.4)	29.7 (85.5)	24.6 (76.3)	20.6 (69.1)	17.0 (62.6)	23.3 (73.9)
Mean daily minimum °C (°F)	8.2 (46.8)	8.0 (46.4)	9.4 (48.9)	11.5 (52.7)	15.2 (59.4)	19.0 (66.2)	22.2 (72.0)	22.4 (72.3)	19.7 (67.5)	16.1 (61.0)	12.9 (55.2)	10.1 (50.2)	14.6 (58.3)

=== Emigration ===
Large-scale emigration abroad as well as to Northern Italy, which began to diminish only in the 1970s, has had a lasting effect on the demographic situation in the region. Emigrants from Siderno immigrated to the United States, Canada and Australia since the end of the 19th century to find employment.

Many moved to Canada settled in Schreiber, Ontario due to then-ongoing construction of the Canadian Pacific Railway. Half of Schreiber's 2,000 residents trace their roots to Siderno.

== Economy ==
Siderno is a tourist resort on the Ionian coast of the province of Reggio Calabria, with wide, sandy beaches, and a clear sea .

The Siderno area is a center of production of bergamot orange, a citrus fruit that is used as an essence and fundamental ingredient in cosmetics, for its wound healing properties in the pharmaceutical industry, and for flavouring in the food industry.

== Crime ==
The town is home to the 'Ndrangheta, a Mafia-type criminal organization based in Calabria. Several powerful criminal clans originate from the town. Siderno was the fiefdom of Antonio Macrì, the undisputed local boss until his demise in January 1975. Several of the criminal clans are sometimes involved in bloody feuds. The town is home to one of the 'Ndrangheta's biggest and most important clans, the Commisso 'ndrina, heavily involved in the global cocaine business and money laundering.

Several clans moved to Canada, in particular the Greater Toronto Area, home to what Canadian law enforcement call the Siderno Group, which has been here since at least the 1950s. "The criminal minds of Siderno are in Canada", according to the Siderno police force. One of them, Antonio Commisso, was arrested in June 2005. Individuals related to the so-called Siderno Group were still active in Southern Ontario in 2018.

== People ==
- Antonio Commisso (born 1956), 'Ndrangheta boss
- Antonio Macrì (1902–1975), historical 'Ndrangheta boss
- Francesco Panetta (born 1963), former long-distance runner
- Nicola Zitara (born 1927), historian
- Leon Panetta (born 1938) – who served in the Obama administration as Director of the Central Intelligence Agency from 2009 to 2011, and as Secretary of Defense from 2011 to 2013, as well as Chief of Staff in the Clinton administration from 1994 to 1997 –, is issued from a family native from Siderno. He was responsible for the operation that led to the Death of Osama bin Laden, the leader and founder of al-Qaeda and the mastermind of the 9/11 attacks
- 'Ndrangheta, Italy's most powerful organized crime syndicate has their roots in Siderno, and continue to use this city as a base of operations.

== Twin cities ==
- Thunder Bay, Canada

== Frazioni ==
Donisi (Greek: Διονυσση, romanized: Dionyssi), Vennerello, Mirto (Greek: Μυρτώς, romanized: Myrtos), Campo, Lucis, Zammariti, Pellegrina, Arona, San Filippo, Leone, Grappidaro, Gonia (Greek: Γωνιά, romanized: Ghonià), Pergola, Lamia.
