= Capobastone =

Hierarchical position in the jargon of the 'Ndrangheta

The Capobastone is a high-ranking 'Ndrangheta who is in charge of a 'ndrina. It is the Calabrian equivalent for the Sicilian Capomandamento.

== Rule ==
In a 'ndrina, the Capobastone make the most important decisions, and report only at the "Capo crimine", the head of the "Crimine". Sometimes he can take the control of all 'Ndrangheta, but he has to be elected by the various Capibastone.
