= 'Ndrina =

Basic unit of the 'Ndrangheta of Calabria

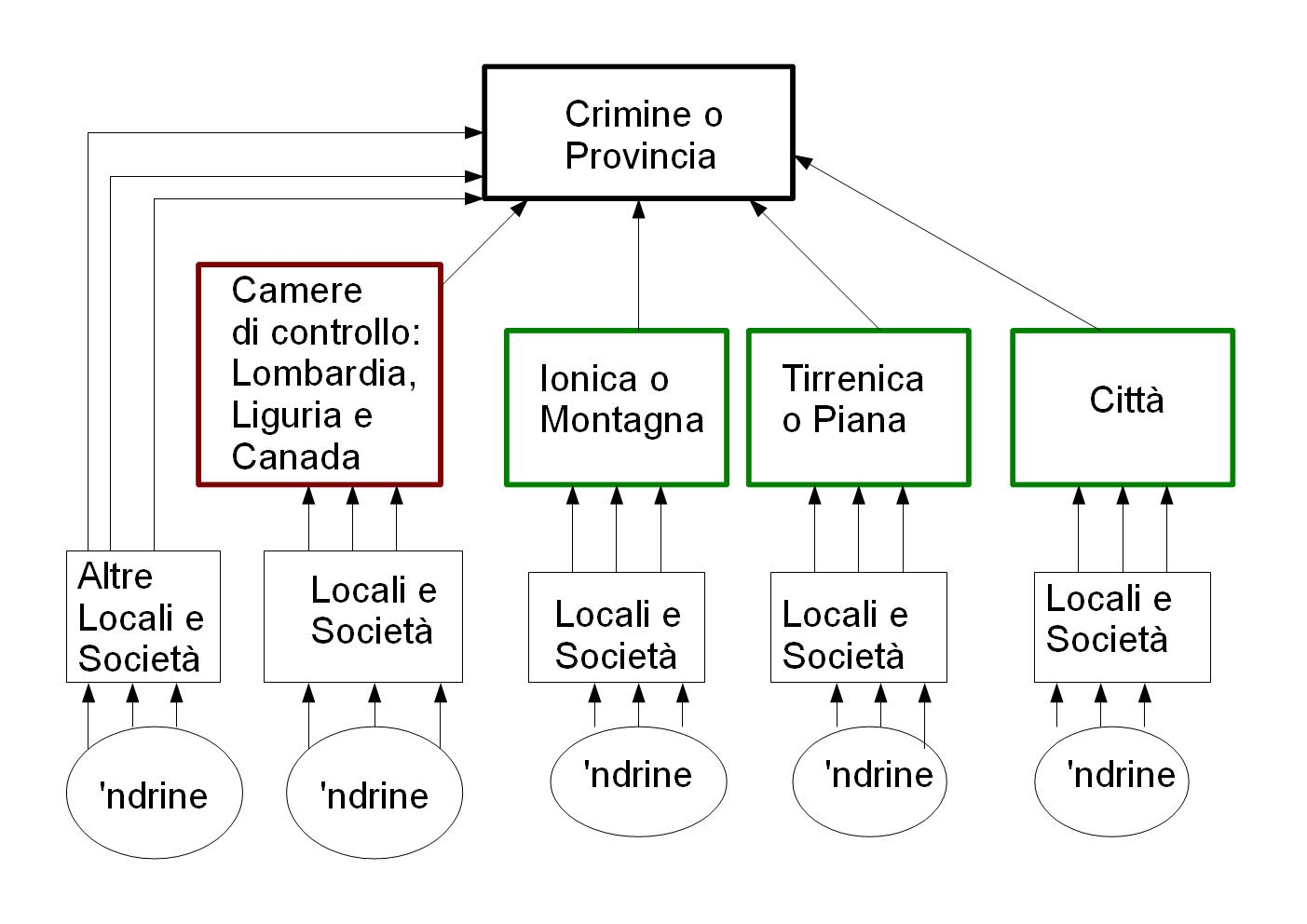
The structure of the 'Ndrangheta. Local 'ndrine are the building blocks, at the base of the hierarchy.

The 'ndrina (Italian: [(a)nˈdriːna], plural: 'ndrine; Calabrian: [(ɳ)ˈɖɽiːna], plural: 'ndrini) is the basic unit of the 'Ndrangheta of Calabria, made up of blood relatives, and is the equivalent of the Sicilian Mafia's "family" or cosca. Each 'ndrina is "autonomous on its territory and no formal authority stands above the 'ndrina boss." The 'ndrina is usually in control of a small town or a neighbourhood in larger cities, even outside Calabria, in cities and towns in the industrial North of Italy, in and around Turin and Milan.

If more than one 'ndrina operates in the same town, they form a locale, the main local organizational unit of the 'Ndrangheta with jurisdiction over an entire town or an area in a large urban center. In some cases, sub-'ndrine have been established. The 'ndrine enjoy a high degree of autonomy – they have a leader, the capobastone, and independent staff. In some contexts the 'ndrine have become more powerful than the locale on which they formally depend.

Blood family and membership of the crime family overlap to a great extent within the 'Ndrangheta. By and large, the 'ndrine consist of men belonging to the same family lineage, under the command of the capobastone. Salvatore Boemi, Anti-mafia prosecutor in Reggio Calabria, told the Italian Antimafia Commission that "one becomes a member for the simple fact of being born in a mafia family", although other reasons might attract a young man to seek membership, and non-kin have also been admitted.

Marriages help cement relations within each 'ndrina and to expand membership. As a result, a few blood families constitute each group, hence "a high number of people with the same last name often end up being prosecuted for membership of a given 'ndrina." Since there is no limit to the membership of a single unit, bosses try to maximize descendants.

== See also ==
- List of 'ndrine
