= 'Ndrangheta =

Criminal organization in Italy

- Onorata Società
- Number of 'ndrina clans per municipality in Calabria as of 2022
- Founding location: Calabria, Italy
- Years active: Since the 19th century
- Territory: Territories with established coordination structures with significant operational territorial control are in Calabria. There is a consolidated presence, especially in the economic and financial sectors, in Northern Italy and Lazio. Organisational coordination structures also exist in Australia and Canada. The 'Ndrangheta also operates in other countries with varying degrees of presence.
- Ethnicity: Calabrians
- Membership (est.): 6,000–10,000 made members; 60,000 affiliates
- Criminal activities: Racketeering, drug trafficking, arms trafficking, loan-sharking, fraud, extortion, murder, robbery, kidnapping, money laundering, agribusiness, agritourism

The 'Ndrangheta (/əndræŋˈɡɛtə/, Italian: [(a)nˈdraŋɡeta], Calabrian: [(ɳ)ˈɖɽaɲɟɪta]) (Note: The initial /n/ is silent in Calabrian unless immediately preceded by a vowel.) is a mafia-type criminal syndicate originating from the Calabria region of Italy. Emerging in the 19th century, it has developed into one of the world's most powerful and pervasive organized crime entities. Characterized by a decentralized, horizontal structure of autonomous operating units known as 'ndrine, the organization's foundational structure is based on family and blood relationships.

Beginning in the mid-20th century, coinciding with significant emigration from Calabria, 'Ndrangheta clans expanded their operations across Northern and Central Italy, Europe, Australia, and the Americas. The syndicate is reportedly involved in a wide array of illegal activities, including drug trafficking, arms trafficking, money laundering, loan sharking, racketeering, and extortion.

The 'Ndrangheta has historically demonstrated a significant capacity to exert its influence on local, regional and national politics through systematic corruption, intimidation, and collusion, and is also known to have infiltrated various sectors of the legal economy, both within Italy and internationally. Estimates in 2013 suggested the organization's revenue reached €53 billion. A U.S. diplomatic cable from 2010 purportedly estimated that the 'Ndrangheta's illicit activities, encompassing drug trafficking, extortion and money laundering, accounted for approximately three percent of Italy's GDP.

Although its origins are contemporary with the Sicilian Cosa Nostra, formal legal designation of the 'Ndrangheta as a mafia-type organization under Article 416 bis of the Italian penal code occurred in 2010. The Italian Supreme Court of Cassation had reached a similar conclusion in March of the same year.

== Etymology ==
In folk culture surrounding the 'Ndrangheta in Calabria, references to the Spanish Garduña often appear. Aside from these references, however, there is nothing to substantiate a link between the two organizations. The Calabrian word 'Ndrangheta derives from the Greek word ἀνδραγαθία (andragathía), meaning "gallantry" or "manly virtue"; or ἀνδράγαθος (andrágathos), a compound of the words ἀνήρ (anḗr; gen. ἀνδρóς, andrós), i.e. man, and ἀγαθός (agathós), i.e. good, brave, meaning a courageous man. In many areas of Calabria, the verb 'ndranghitiari, from the Greek verb andragathízesthai, means "to engage in a defiant and valiant attitude".

The etymological approach is criticised by some historians. John Dickie argues that "the flattering connotations of the word 'Ndrangheta (courage, martial prowess, manliness) indicate that the 'Ndrangheta as a social phenomenon was rooted in the same positive values, and that it only later degenerated into criminality."

A historical and sociological approach shows that 'Ndrangheta is actually the most recent of many earlier descriptions of the phenomenon of organised crime in Calabria. Historical evidence suggests, according to Dickie, the use of 'Ndrangheta as a name for the Calabrian mafia was adopted by Calabrian mafiosi themselves around the time it first appeared in documentary sources of the Carabinieri in the late 1920s. The word 'Ndrangheta was brought to a wider audience by the Calabrian writer Corrado Alvaro in the Corriere della Sera in September 1955.

== Structure ==
=== Organizational structure ===
Formulas from the code of the 'Ndrangheta: The three handwritten pages describe the text for the speech held when a member is promoted to a higher rank. The text, written in uncertain Italian with grammatical and orthographic errors, appears awkward to native speakers.

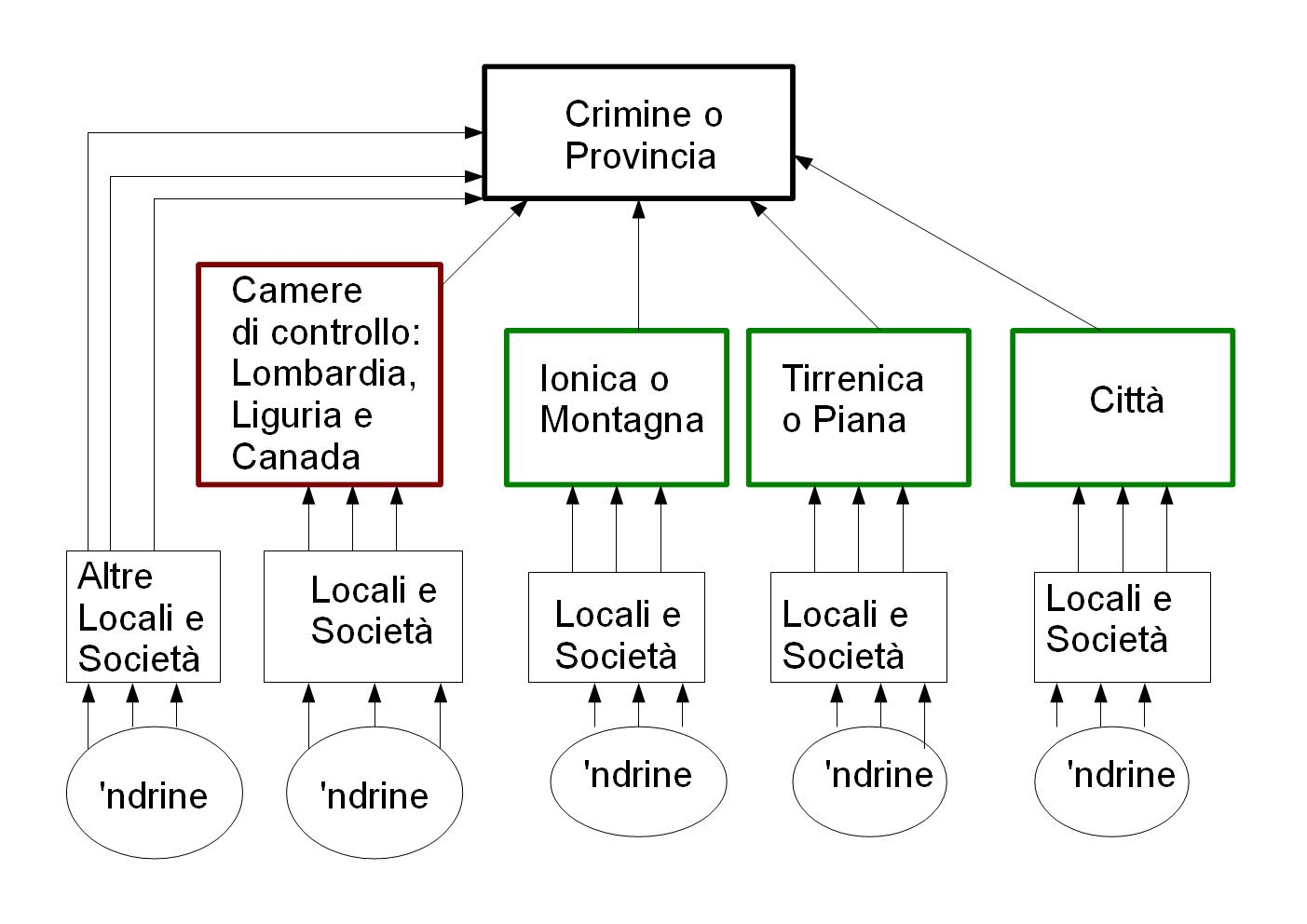
The 'Ndrangheta hierarchy, labeled in Italian

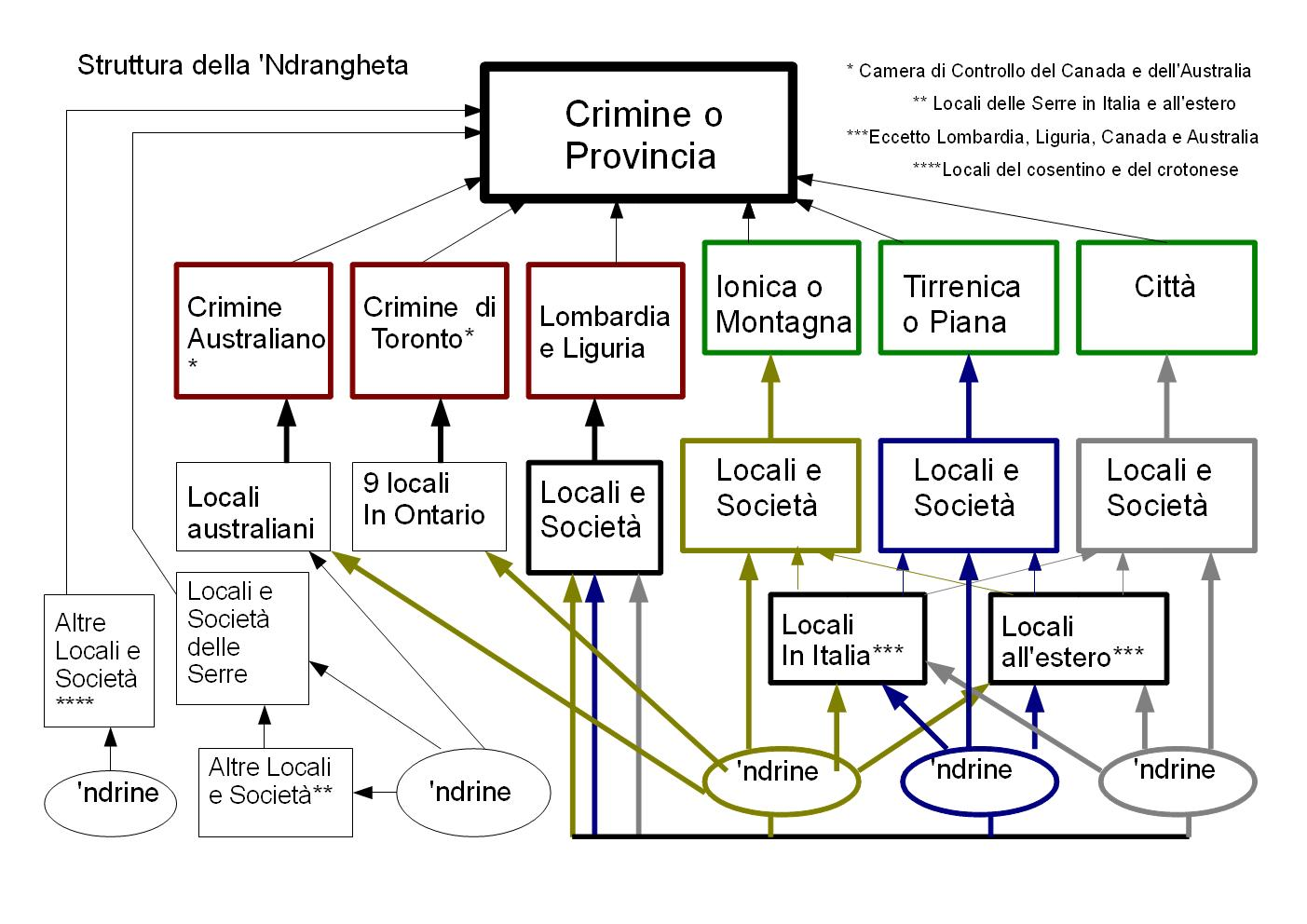
Detailed 'Ndrangheta structure, labeled in Italian

Similar to the Sicilian Cosa Nostra, the 'Ndrangheta is structured as a loose confederation of approximately one hundred groups, referred to as cosche, or families. Each group asserts authority over a specific territory, typically a town or village, although their control over the monopoly of violence in these areas is not always absolute or fully legitimized.

Estimates suggest that there are around 100 of these families, encompassing between 4,000 and 5,000 members within Reggio Calabria. Other estimates indicate a membership of 6,000–7,000 individuals, with a potential worldwide membership reaching approximately 10,000.

The majority of these groups, numbering around 86, are active in the Province of Reggio Calabria. It is also believed that a portion of the reported 70 criminal groups based in the Calabrian provinces of Catanzaro and Cosenza maintain formal affiliations with the 'Ndrangheta. These family groups are primarily concentrated in impoverished towns and villages within Calabria, including Platì, Locri, San Luca, Africo and Altomonte, as well as in Reggio Calabria, the main city and provincial capital.

San Luca is widely regarded as a significant stronghold of the 'Ndrangheta. According to testimony from a former 'ndranghetista, "almost all the male inhabitants belong to the 'Ndrangheta", and the Sanctuary of Our Lady of Polsi has historically served as a meeting place for affiliates. Bosses from regions outside Calabria, including Canada and Australia, are reported to regularly attend meetings at the Sanctuary of Polsi, suggesting that 'ndrine globally perceive themselves as part of a unified collective entity.

The fundamental local organizational unit within the 'Ndrangheta is the locale (local or place), which exercises jurisdiction over a town or a specific area within a larger urban center. A locale may encompass branches known as 'ndrina (plural: 'ndrine), which can be situated in different districts of the same city, in neighbouring towns or villages or even outside Calabria. Notably, 'ndrine have been established in cities and towns in Northern Italy, particularly in the industrial regions around Turin and Milan.

Within the 'Ndrangheta, membership in a crime family and blood relations are significantly intertwined. 'Ndrine predominantly consist of individuals from the same family lineage. Salvatore Boemi, an anti-mafia prosecutor in Reggio Calabria, informed the Antimafia Commission that membership is often acquired "for the simple fact of being born into a mafia family". While other factors may attract individuals to seek membership, and non-kin have been admitted, familial ties remain central. Marriages serve to strengthen relationships within 'ndrine and expand membership. Consequently, each group is often composed of a few core blood families, leading to situations where "a high number of people with the same last name often end up being prosecuted for membership of a given 'ndrina." Given the absence of membership limits within a unit, bosses may prioritize maximizing descendants to strengthen their group.

The hierarchy within an 'ndrina includes various ranks. At the base are the picciotti d'onore (soldiers), expected to execute tasks with unquestioning obedience, until promotion to the level of cammorista (not to be confused with members of the Camorra, another mafia-type group). Cammoristi are granted command over their own group of soldiers. Above the 'ndrina level, but still within the 'Ndrangheta structure, is the rank of santista, followed by vangelista. Aspiring vangelisti are required to swear an oath of dedication to a life of crime upon the Bible. The quintino, also referred to as padrino, represents the second-highest level of command within an 'Ndrangheta clan (Ndrina). This level comprises five privileged members who report directly to the boss, known as the capobastone (head of command).

During a 2018 trial in Toronto, former mobster Carmine Guido testified that the 'Ndrangheta is a collective of family-based clans, each with its own boss, operating within a unified structure and under a board of control.

=== Power structure ===
Historically, individual family power structures served as the primary governing bodies within both Cosa Nostra and the 'Ndrangheta. These family structures have remained central to power dynamics, even after the establishment of superordinate bodies. While Cosa Nostra created the Sicilian Commission in the 1950s, the 'Ndrangheta established a superordinate body only in 1991, following negotiations to resolve prolonged inter-family conflicts. However, the notion of absolute autonomy for Calabrian crime families prior to this period is not universally supported by historical evidence. Evidence suggests that mechanisms for coordination and dispute resolution have existed since at least the late 19th century, with frequent interactions and meetings among bosses of locali. Operation Crimine, a significant investigation culminating in the arrest of 305 'Ndrangheta members in July 2010, indicated a more hierarchical, unified and pyramidal structure than previously understood. Italy's chief anti-mafia prosecutor, Pietro Grasso, described the organization as not solely clan-based.

While the legal classification of the 'Ndrangheta as a hierarchical structure is advantageous for Italian criminal law, enabling broader convictions through the doctrine of criminal association, some criminologists dispute the view of the 'Ndrangheta as a consistently monolithic organization. Criminologist Anna Sergi suggests that while coordinating structures exist, they primarily serve to facilitate business ventures and risk sharing among distinct clans. According to this perspective, clans remain independent territorial units rooted in family ties, and do not consistently operate under a unified strategic plan. Sergi argues that "'Ndrangheta" functions more as a brand than a description of a tightly integrated organization. She posits that the misconception of the 'Ndrangheta as a singular entity may inadvertently benefit these groups, allowing them to leverage the organization's international reputation to exploit political vulnerabilities, invest in new enterprises and expand their influence.

Since at least the 1950s, chiefs of 'Ndrangheta locali have reportedly convened regularly near the Sanctuary of Our Lady of Polsi in San Luca during the September Feast. These annual gatherings, known as the crimine, have traditionally provided a forum for discussing future strategies and resolving disputes among locali. The assembly exercises limited supervisory authority over the activities of all 'Ndrangheta groups. Emphasis is placed on the temporary nature of the crimine boss's position, with a new representative elected at each meeting. Contrary to the "boss of bosses" concept, the capo crimine is believed to possess relatively limited power to intervene in family conflicts or regulate inter-family violence.

During these meetings, each boss is expected to "give account of all the activities carried out during the year and of all the most important facts taking place in his territory such as kidnappings, homicides, etc." The historical prominence of the San Luca family is such that any new group or locale is reportedly required to obtain authorization from San Luca to operate. Furthermore, each 'Ndrangheta group "still has to deposit a small percentage of illicit proceeds to the principale of San Luca in recognition of the latter's primordial supremacy".

Security concerns within the 'Ndrangheta have led to the formation of a secret society within the larger organization, known as La Santa. Membership in La Santa is exclusive, known only to fellow members. In a departure from traditional code, La Santa allowed bosses to cultivate close relationships with state officials, with some even becoming affiliated with La Santa. These connections were often facilitated through Freemasonry, which santisti were permitted to join, despite it being another breach of traditional 'Ndrangheta code.

Since the conclusion of the Second 'Ndrangheta War in 1991, the 'Ndrangheta has been governed by a collegial body or commission, known as La Provincia. Its primary function is to mediate and resolve inter-family disputes. This body, also referred to as the Commission in reference to the Sicilian counterpart, comprises three subordinate bodies known as mandamenti. These include a mandamento for clans on the Ionic side of Calabria (including the Aspromonte mountains and Locride), a second for the Tyrrhenian side (the plains of Gioia Tauro) and a central mandamento for the city of Reggio Calabria.

A July 2019 article published in Canada summarized the traditional 'Ndrangheta structure. According to this report:

"For decades, the 'Ndrangheta families of Siderno operating in Canada—about seven of them—have been governed by a board of directors, called the "camera di controllo", or chamber of control. The local board, as in other countries around the world and other regions of Italy where clans have spread, have all been subservient to the mother clans of Calabria, under a body known as 'il Crimine di Siderno'."

However, by mid-2019, law enforcement in both Italy and Canada reportedly believed that the 'Ndrangheta's presence in Canada had become so powerful that the board north of Toronto possessed the authority to make decisions not only within Canada's underworld but also internationally, potentially even superseding the authority of clans in Siderno.

=== The 'Ndrangheta in Northern Italy ===
The presence of the 'Ndrangheta in Northern Italy can be traced back to the early 1960s, driven by a wave of labour migration from Calabria and the implementation of soggiorno obbligato – a policy of mandatory internal exile intended to isolate crime bosses from their hometowns and criminal base in Calabria and Sicily. However, lawmakers failed to foresee that this strategy would backfire, effectively facilitating the northward expansion of mafia activity.

A notable case is that of Bardonecchia, an alpine town in Piedmont near Turin, where Rocco Lo Presti was relocated in 1963. He was later joined by his cousin, Francesco Mazzaferro. Their criminal involvement in the local construction sector drew the attention of the parliamentary Antimafia Commission, which conducted its first-ever inspection in Northern Italy in 1973, focusing on Bardonecchia. Lo Presti and Mazzaferro were identified as the dominant figures of the 'Ndrangheta in the Val di Susa area. Ultimately, in 1995, Bardonecchia became the first municipality in Northern Italy to be dissolved for suspected mafia infiltration, resulting in Lo Presti’s arrest.

The towns of Corsico and Buccinasco in Lombardy are also considered to be 'Ndrangheta strongholds. Sub-units known as sotto 'ndrine are sometimes established. These subunits possess considerable autonomy, with their own leadership and staff. In some instances, 'ndrine have reportedly become more influential than the locale to which they are formally subordinate. Other perspectives suggest that the 'ndrina itself is the fundamental organizational unit. According to the Antimafia Commission, each 'ndrina operates autonomously within its territory, with no formal authority above the 'ndrina boss. Typically, an 'ndrina controls a small town or a neighborhood. In cases where multiple 'ndrine operate within the same town, they may form a locale.

== Characteristics ==
In 2007, Italian anti-organized crime agencies estimated the 'Ndrangheta's annual revenue to be approximately €35–40 billion (equivalent to US$35–40 billion), representing roughly 3.5% of Italy's GDP. This revenue is primarily generated from illicit drug trafficking, but also from ostensibly legitimate businesses such as construction, restaurants, and supermarkets. The 'Ndrangheta is considered to exert significant control over the economy and governance of Calabria. According to a leaked U.S. diplomatic cable, the organization controls substantial portions of the region's territory and economy, accounting for at least three percent of Italy's GDP through activities including drug trafficking, extortion, skimming of public contracts, and usury.

A key distinction between the 'Ndrangheta and other mafia-type organizations, such as the Sicilian Mafia, lies in recruitment methods. The 'Ndrangheta primarily recruits members based on blood relations, fostering strong cohesion within family clans, which presents considerable challenges for law enforcement investigations. Sons of 'ndranghetisti are generally expected to follow in their fathers' criminal careers, undergoing a socialization process from a young age to become giovani d'onore ('boys of honour') before formally joining the ranks as uomini d'onore ('men of honour'). Compared to the Sicilian Mafia during the early 1990s, relatively few Calabrian mafiosi have become collaborators with the state; by the end of 2002, there were 157 Calabrian witnesses in the state witness protection program. Furthermore, the 'Ndrangheta has generally avoided direct, overt confrontations with the Italian state.

Prosecutions in Calabria are reportedly hampered by the tendency of Italian judges and prosecutors who achieve high exam scores to preferentially choose postings outside of Calabria. Those assigned to Calabria often seek immediate transfers. Combined with a limited government presence and instances of official corruption, a climate of fear and reluctance to cooperate with law enforcement prevails among civilians in the region.

Alex Perry's 2018 book, The Good Mothers: The True Story of the Women Who Took on the World's Most Powerful Mafia, asserts that over the past decade, the Calabrian 'Ndrangheta has been supplanting the Sicilian Cosa Nostra as the dominant drug trafficking organization in North America.

== Activities ==
According to the Italian DIA (Direzione Investigativa Antimafia, Department of the Police of Italy against organized crime) and Guardia di Finanza (Italian Financial Police and Customs Police), the 'Ndrangheta is considered "one of the most powerful criminal organizations in the world." The 'Ndrangheta's economic activities encompass international smuggling of cocaine and weapons. Italian investigators have estimated that approximately 80% of Europe's cocaine transits through the Calabrian port of Gioia Tauro and is controlled by the 'Ndrangheta. However, a report by the European Monitoring Centre for Drugs and Drug Addiction (EMCDDA) and Europol indicates that the Iberian Peninsula is considered the primary entry point for cocaine into Europe and a major gateway to the European market. The United Nations Office on Drugs and Crime (UNODC) estimated that in 2007, cocaine interceptions in Spain (almost 38 metric tons) were nearly ten times greater than in Italy (almost 4 metric tons).

'Ndrangheta and Sicilian Cosa Nostra groups are known to engage in joint ventures in cocaine trafficking operations. Additional activities include skimming funds from large public works projects, money laundering, and traditional criminal activities such as usury and extortion. The 'Ndrangheta reportedly invests illicit profits in legitimate real estate and financial ventures. In February 2017, Italian Carabinieri reportedly arrested 33 individuals suspected of involvement with the Piromalli 'ndrina, a clan associated with the 'Ndrangheta. The arrests were linked to allegations of exporting fraudulently labeled olive oil to the United States. According to reports, inexpensive olive pomace oil was being marketed as more expensive extra virgin olive oil. Earlier, in 2016, the American television program 60 Minutes broadcast a segment that cautioned about the infiltration of the olive oil industry by organized crime, stating that "Agromafia" constituted a $16 billion per year enterprise.

Estimates from Eurispes (Institute of Political, Economic and Social Studies), an Italian private research institute, placed the 'Ndrangheta's business volume at approximately €44 billion in 2007. This figure represented about 2.9% of Italy's GDP. Drug trafficking was identified as the most lucrative activity, accounting for 62% of the total revenue.

Estimated Total Turnover of the 'Ndrangheta in 2007
Illicit activity	Income
Drug trafficking	€ 27.240 billion
Commercial enterprise and public contracts	€ 5.733 billion
Extortion and usury	€ 5.017 billion
Arms trafficking	€ 2.938 billion
Prostitution and human trafficking	€ 2.867 billion
Total	€ 43.795 billion

== History ==
In 1861, the prefect of Reggio Calabria noted the presence of groups referred to as camorristi. This term was used at the time as a general descriptor for organized crime in the region, as the 'Ndrangheta was not yet formally identified, and the Camorra in Naples was a more established and recognized criminal organization. Police reports and local court sentences from the 1880s onward provide substantial evidence of 'Ndrangheta-type groups. During this period, they were often referred to by various names, including picciotteria, onorata società (honored society), 'ndrina, Famiglia Montalbano, fibbia, or simply camorra and mafia. These clandestine societies operating in Calabria's olive and vine-rich areas were distinct from more anarchic forms of local banditry. According to an 1890 court sentence in Reggio Calabria, they were hierarchically organized and adhered to a code of conduct that included omertà, the code of silence. An 1897 court sentence from Palmi referenced a written code of rules discovered in Seminara. This code emphasized honour, secrecy, violence, solidarity (often based on blood relations), and mutual assistance.

=== Modern history ===
Until the 1960s, the 'Ndrangheta primarily confined its operations within Italy to Calabria, focusing mainly on extortion and blackmail. Their involvement in cigarette smuggling expanded their reach and facilitated contacts with the Sicilian Mafia and the Neapolitan Camorra. With the initiation of large public works projects in Calabria, skimming of public contracts became a significant revenue stream. Disagreements over the distribution of illicit gains led to the First 'Ndrangheta war (1974–1977), resulting in approximately 233 fatalities. Factions involved in the conflict began kidnapping wealthy individuals in Northern Italy for ransom. A notable case was the 1973 kidnapping of John Paul Getty III, during which his severed ear was sent to a newspaper in November. He was eventually released in December following a negotiated ransom payment of $2.2 million by his grandfather, J. Paul Getty. It is estimated that the 'Ndrangheta was responsible for over 200 kidnappings between the 1970s and mid-1990s.

The Second 'Ndrangheta war occurred from 1985 to 1991. This six-year conflict between the Condello-Imerti-Serraino-Rosmini clans and the De Stefano-Tegano-Libri-Latella clans resulted in over 600 fatalities. The Sicilian Mafia is believed to have played a role in mediating the end of this conflict, possibly suggesting the establishment of a superordinate body, La Provincia, to prevent future internal disputes.

Francesco Fortugno, Deputy President of the regional parliament of Calabria, was assassinated by the 'Ndrangheta on 16 October 2005 in Locri. This event prompted public demonstrations against the organization, with young protesters displaying banners reading "Ammazzateci tutti!" (Italian for "Kill us all"). In response, the Italian national government initiated a large-scale law enforcement operation in Calabria, leading to the arrest of numerous 'ndranghetisti, including those responsible for Fortugno's murder.

In June 2014, Pope Francis publicly condemned the 'Ndrangheta for their "adoration of evil and contempt of the common good." He stated that the Church would actively combat organized crime and asserted that mafiosi were excommunicated. A Vatican spokesperson clarified that the Pope's statement did not constitute a formal excommunication under canon law, as such a measure requires a formal legal process.

On 12 July 2025, an alleged leader of the Italian 'ndrangheta mafia in Latin America Giuseppe Palermo, also known as "Peppe," was arrested in Colombia.

== Law enforcement operations in Italy ==
The 'Ndrangheta has expanded its operations into Northern Italy, primarily for drug trafficking and investment in legitimate businesses, which can be used for money laundering. In May 2007, twenty individuals identified as 'Ndrangheta members were arrested in Milan. On 30 August 2007, a large-scale police raid involving hundreds of officers targeted San Luca, a town central to the San Luca feud between rival 'Ndrangheta clans. Over 30 individuals, both men and women, with alleged links to the killings of six Italian men in Germany, were apprehended.

On 4 June 2012, a multinational law enforcement operation resulted in numerous arrests across Spain, Croatia, Slovenia, Italy, the Netherlands, Bulgaria, and Finland. This operation followed an investigation by the Milan District Anti-Mafia Prosecutor's Office into Swiss bank accounts and a fleet of ships allegedly used to transport cocaine to Europe from Venezuela, Argentina, and the Dominican Republic.

On 9 October 2012, after a months-long central government investigation, the City Council of Reggio Calabria, led by Mayor Demetrio Arena, was dissolved due to alleged ties to the 'Ndrangheta. Mayor Arena and all 30 city councilors were removed from office to prevent potential "mafia contagion" within the local government. This marked the first instance of a provincial capital's government being dismissed. Three administrators appointed by the central government governed the city for 18 months until new elections were held. The action followed suspicions that unnamed councilors had ties to the 'Ndrangheta during the 10-year center-right administration of Mayor Giuseppe Scopelliti.

'Ndrangheta infiltration of political offices extends beyond Calabria. On 10 October 2012, Domenico Zambetti of People of Freedom (PDL), Milan's regional government commissioner in charge of public housing, was arrested. He was accused of paying the 'Ndrangheta to secure election victories and to solicit favors and contracts, including construction tenders for World Expo 2015 in Milan. This vote-buying investigation highlighted the 'Ndrangheta's infiltration into the political structures of Lombardy, Italy's affluent northern region. Zambetti's arrest was described as the most significant case of 'Ndrangheta infiltration uncovered in Northern Italy to date, prompting calls for the resignation of Lombardy governor Roberto Formigoni.

On 12 December 2017, 48 individuals identified as 'Ndrangheta members were arrested on charges including mafia association, extortion, criminal damage, fraudulent asset transfer, and illegal firearm possession. Of those arrested, four were placed under house arrest, and 44 were ordered to be jailed. Among those indicted were a two-time mayor of Taurianova, Calabria and a former cabinet member. Investigators alleged that 'Ndrangheta clans had infiltrated public works construction, real estate brokerage, the food industry, greenhouse production, and renewable energy sectors.

On 9 January 2018, law enforcement operations in Italy and Germany resulted in the arrest of 169 individuals linked to the 'Ndrangheta, specifically the Farao and Marincola clans based in Calabria. Assets valued at €50 million (£44/$59m) were seized. The indictment detailed how owners of German restaurants, ice cream parlors, hotels, and pizzerias were coerced into purchasing wine, pizza dough, pastries, and other products sourced from Southern Italy. The Farao clan, reportedly led by the imprisoned Giuseppe Farao, who allegedly relayed orders to his sons, controlled businesses including bakeries, vineyards, olive groves, funeral homes, launderettes, plastic recycling plants, and shipyards.

The 'Ndrangheta also infiltrated the waste disposal operations of Ilva steel company in Taranto. Charges in these operations included mafia association, attempted murder, money laundering, extortion, and illegal weapons possession and trafficking. Italian prosecutor Nicola Gratteri characterized these arrests as the most significant action against the 'Ndrangheta in the preceding 20 years. Eleven suspects arrested in Germany were accused of blackmail and money laundering and were subsequently deported to Italy. Alessandro Figliomeni, former mayor of Siderno, Calabria, received a 12-year prison sentence on 7 May 2018 for mafia association, allegedly being a member of the Commisso 'ndrina clan and holding a high-ranking position.

In December 2019, over 300 individuals were arrested in Calabria on suspicion of 'Ndrangheta membership in an operation involving 2,500 police officers. Among those arrested was Giancarlo Pittelli, a prominent lawyer and former member of Silvio Berlusconi's Forza Italia party. Nicola Gratteri, chief prosecutor in Catanzaro, described these arrests as the second largest in Italian organized crime history, surpassed only by the arrests leading to the "Maxi Trial" of Sicilian Mafia bosses in Palermo between 1986 and 1992. The trial of these more than 300 'Ndrangheta members commenced on 13 January 2021.

In early May 2023, a police crackdown targeting the 'Ndrangheta network resulted in the arrest of 108 individuals in Italy by Carabinieri and 30 in Germany by over 1,000 police officers. The operation, prompted by suspicions of cocaine smuggling, money laundering, and other offenses, followed four years of covert investigations and involved coordinated probes by investigators in Belgium, France, Germany, Italy, Portugal, and Spain. Major investigative efforts included gaining insights into the organization's internal operations, including their use of crypto phones and services such as EncroChat and Sky ECC, which the 'Ndrangheta reportedly utilized due to movement restrictions during the COVID-19 pandemic.

Also in 2023, allegations emerged regarding links between the 'Ndrangheta and the Gambino family, suggesting that the 'Ndrangheta uses New York as a training ground for new recruits.

In November 2023, over 200 individuals associated with the 'Ndrangheta were convicted in what was described as the largest mafia trial in three decades. Despite over 100 acquittals following the three-year trial, the convictions were considered a significant setback to the organization's activities in Europe. Almost all defendants had been initially arrested in 2019.

== Outside Italy ==
The 'Ndrangheta has established branches abroad, mainly through migration. The overlap of blood and mafia family seems to have helped the 'Ndrangheta expand beyond its traditional territory: "The familial bond has not only worked as a shield to protect secrets and enhance security, but also helped to maintain identity in the territory of origin and reproduce it in territories where the family has migrated." 'Ndrine are reported to be operating in northern and central Italy, Germany, Belgium, the Netherlands, France, the rest of Europe, the Americas, Australia, West Africa, and Asia. One group of 'ndranghetisti discovered outside Italy was in Ontario, Canada, several decades ago. They were dubbed the Siderno Group by Canadian judges as most of its members hailed from and around Siderno.

In 2007, magistrates in Calabria warned about the international scale of the 'Ndrangheta's operations. It is now believed to have surpassed the traditional axis between the Sicilian and American Cosa Nostra, to become the major importer of cocaine to Europe. Outside Italy the 'Ndrangheta operates in several countries, such as:

=== Albania ===
In a report that was leaked to a Berlin newspaper, the Bundesnachrichtendienst, the German federal intelligence service, stated that the 'Ndrangheta "act in close co-operation with Albanian mafia families in moving weapons and narcotics across Europe's porous borders".

=== Argentina ===
In November 2006, a cocaine trafficking network that operated in Argentina, Spain and Italy was dismantled. The Argentinian police said the 'Ndrangheta had roots in the country and shipped cocaine through Spain to Milan and Turin. In October 2022, an Italian 'Ndrangheta mafia leader, Carmine Alfonso Maiorano, who was responsible for drug and arms trafficking operations between South America and Europe was captured in Guernica, Buenos Aires after years-long of manhunt.

=== Australia ===
Known by the name "The Honoured Society," the 'Ndrangheta have controlled Italian-Australian organized crime all along the east coast of Australia since the early 20th century. 'Ndrangheta operating in Australia include the Sergi, Barbaro and Papalia clans. In Victoria the major families are named as Italiano, Arena, Muratore, Benvenuto, and Condello. In the 1960s, warfare broke out among 'Ndrangheta clans over the control of the Victoria Market in Melbourne, through which an estimated $45 million worth of fruits and vegetables passed each year. After the death of Domenico Italiano, known as Il Papa, different clans tried to gain control over the produce market. At the time it was unclear that most involved were affiliated with the 'Ndrangheta.

The 'Ndrangheta began in Australia in Queensland, where they continued their form of rural organised crime, especially in the fruit and vegetable industry. The 1998–2006 Melbourne gangland killings included the murder of 'Ndrangheta Godfather Frank Benvenuto, and in 2008 the 'Ndrangheta were tied to the importation of 15 million ecstasy pills to Melbourne, at the time the world's largest ecstasy haul. The pills were hidden in a container-load of tomato cans from Calabria. Australian 'Ndrangheta boss Pasquale Barbaro was arrested. Pasquale Barbaro's father Francesco Barbaro was a boss throughout the 1970s and early 1980s until his retirement. Several of the Barbaro clan, including Francesco among others, were suspected in orchestrating the murder of Australian businessman Donald Mackay in July 1977 for his anti-drugs campaign.

Italian authorities believe that the former mayor of the Western Australian city of Stirling, Tony Vallelonga, is an associate of Giuseppe Commisso, boss of the Siderno clan of the 'Ndrangheta. In 2009, Italian police overheard the two discussing 'Ndrangheta activities. Since migrating from Italy to Australia in 1963, Vallelonga has "established a long career in grass-roots politics".

The 'Ndrangheta are also tied to large cocaine imports. Between 2002 and 2004 up to 500 kilograms of cocaine connected to the mafia and Australian associates were smuggled from South America to Melbourne via Italy in slabs of marble, plastic tubes, and canned tuna. A report in 2016 by Vice Media indicated that the activities continued to be profitable: "Between 2004 and 2014, the gang's members amassed more than $10 million [$7.6 million USD] in real estate and race horses in Victoria alone, pouring money into wholesalers, cafes, and restaurants."

A June 2015 report by BBC News discussed an investigation by Fairfax Media and Four Corners which alleged that "the 'Ndrangheta, runs a drugs and extortion business worth billions of euros" in Australia and that "politicians have been infiltrated by the Calabrian mafia".

In February 2020, two individuals said to be "multimillionaire fruit and vegetable kings" were alleged to be 'Ndrangheta "capos", having a relationship with the "secretive criminal organisation". The Sydney Morning Herald report specified that the two "are not accused of any crime in either Italy or Australia". The alleged information was obtained during investigations of other individuals during Operation Eyphemos in Calabria, which "led to the arrest ... of 65 men for alleged mafia activities including extortion and political corruption in Calabria".

=== Belgium ===
'Ndrangheta clans purchased almost "an entire neighbourhood" in Brussels with laundered money originating from drug trafficking. On 5 March 2004, 47 people were arrested, accused of drug trafficking and money laundering to purchase real estate in Brussels for some 28 million euros. The activities extended to the Netherlands where large quantities of heroin and cocaine had been purchased by the Pesce-Bellocco clan from Rosarno and the Strangio clan from San Luca.

=== Brazil ===
The 'Ndrangheta has operated in Brazil since the 1970s, but an alliance between various 'ndrine clans and the Primeiro Comando da Capital since the mid-2010s has increased the mafia's presence in the country. A reliable stream of cocaine from Brazil is crucial to the 'Ndrangheta's grip on the European cocaine market, and the alliance has enabled a massive overseas expansion for the PCC through access to different markets across Africa, Europe and Asia. A share of cocaine exported by the PCC and the 'Ndrangheta moves through West Africa, and international and regional law enforcement investigations have implicated 'Ndrangheta elements in cocaine trafficking in several countries across the region, including Senegal, Niger, Ghana and Côte d'Ivoire. 'Ndrine clans operate in West Africa through the stable presence of individuals in certain countries, as well as through trusted brokers established through visits by 'Ndrangheta clan family members.

In May 2021, a joint operation by the Federal Police of Brazil, Interpol and Italian police arrested Italian mobster Vincenzo Pasquino, in a flat in João Pessoa, along with Rocco Morabito, one of the most wanted Italian drug traffickers at the time. Pasquino held a leadership position in the Calabrian mafia, the 'Ndrangheta.

Several important 'Ndrangheta bosses have been arrested in Brazil, such as Domenico Pelle, Nicola Assisi and Rocco Morabito. Assisi and Morabito (according to investigations by the Brazilian Federal Police) resided in Brazil, where they pretended to be legitimate businessmen and lived in luxury properties, while negotiating with important members of the PCC.

In 2022, a Federal Police investigation on the PCC's usage of the Port of Rio de Janeiro for part of its cocaine exports to Europe revealed a criminal network that included Chendal Wilfrido Rosa, a member of the No Limit Soldiers who was acting as a representative for 'Ndrangheta in Brazil.

In June 2023, the São Paulo Civil Police arrested Garip Uç, a Turkish chemist associated with Hezbollah, during an operation in Praia Grande. Investigations later pointed to Moroccan hashish being imported to Brazil by a criminal network that involved the PCC, 'Ndrangheta, the Balkan Mafia and Hezbollah, by way of Barakat clan entrepreneurs who operated in the Triple Frontier region.

In July 2024, Vincenzo Pasquino, who was arrested in Brazil, decided to tell the authorities in his country about the criminal factions PCC and CV's secrets. He signed a kind of plea bargain with the Italian justice system.

=== Canada ===
According to a May 2018 news report, "Siderno's Old World 'Ndrangheta boss sent acolytes to populate the New World" including Michele (Mike) Racco who settled in Toronto in 1952, followed by other mob families. By 2010, investigators in Italy said that Toronto's 'Ndrangheta had climbed "to the top of the criminal world" with "an unbreakable umbilical cord" to Calabria.

The Canadian 'Ndrangheta is believed to be involved in various activities including the smuggling of unlicensed tobacco products through ties with criminal elements in cross-border Native American tribes. According to Alberto Cisterna of the Italian National Anti-Mafia Directorate, the 'Ndrangheta has a heavy presence in Canada. "There is a massive number of their people in North America, especially in Toronto. And for two reasons. The first is linked to the banking system. Canada's banking system is very secretive; it does not allow investigation. So Canada is the ideal place to launder money. The second reason is to smuggle drugs." The 'Ndrangheta have found Canada a useful North American entry point. The organization used extortion, loan sharking, theft, electoral crimes, mortgage and bank fraud, crimes of violence and cocaine trafficking.

A Canadian branch labelled the Siderno Group has been active in Canada since the 1950s; it was formed originally by Michele (Mike) Racco, who was the head of the Group until his death in 1980. Siderno is also home to one of the 'Ndrangheta's biggest and most important clans, heavily involved in the global cocaine business and money laundering. Antonio Commisso, the alleged leader of the Siderno group, is reported to lead efforts to import "illicit arms, explosives and drugs". Elements of 'Ndrangheta have been reported to have been present in Hamilton, Ontario as early as 1911. Historical crime families in the Hamilton area include the Musitanos, Luppinos and Papalias.

According to an agreed Statement of Fact filed with the court, "the Locali [local cells] outside of Calabria replicate the structure from Calabria, and are connected to their mother-Locali in Calabria. The authority to start Locali outside Calabria comes from the governing bodies of the organization in Calabria. The Locali outside of Calabria are part of the same 'Ndrangheta organization as in Calabria, and maintain close relationships with the Locali where its members come from." The group's activities in the Greater Toronto Area were controlled by a group known as the 'Camera di Controllo' which "makes all of the final decisions", according to the witness' testimony. It consists of six or seven Toronto-area men, who co-ordinate activities and resolves disputes among Calabrian gangsters in Southern Ontario. In 1962, Racco established a crimini or Camera di Controllo in Canada with the help of Giacomo Luppino and Rocco Zito. One of the members was Giuseppe Coluccio, before he was arrested and extradited to Italy. Other members are Vincenzo DeMaria, Carmine Verduci before his death, and Cosimo Stalteri before his death. In August 2015, the Immigration and Refugee Board of Canada (IRB) issued a deportation order for Carmelo Bruzzese. Bruzzese appealed the decision to Canada's Federal Court, but it was rejected, and on 2 October 2015, Bruzzese was escorted onto a plane in Toronto, landing in Rome, where he was arrested by Italian police. Major Giuseppe De Felice, a commander with the Carabinieri, told the IRB that Bruzzese "assumed the most important roles and decisions. He gave the orders."

After living in Richmond Hill, Ontario for five years until 2010, Antonio Coluccio was one of 29 people named in arrest warrants in Italy in September 2014. Police said they were part of the Commisso 'ndrina ('Ndrangheta) crime family in Siderno. In July 2018, Coluccio was sentenced to 30 years in prison for corruption. His two brothers, including Salvatore and Giuseppe Coluccio, were already in prison due to Mafia-related convictions.

In June 2018, Cosimo Ernesto Commisso, of Woodbridge, Ontario, and an unrelated woman were shot and killed in his vehicle whilst outside his home. According to sources contacted by the Toronto Star, "Commisso was related to Cosimo "The Quail" Commisso of Siderno, Italy, who has had relations in Ontario, is considered by police to be a "'Ndrangheta organized crime boss". The National Post reported that Cosimo Ernesto Commisso, while not a known criminal, "shares a name and family ties with a man who has for decades been reputed to be a Mafia leader in the Toronto area". The cousin of "The Quail", Antonio Commisso, was on the list of most wanted fugitives in Italy until his capture on 28 June 2005, in Woodbridge.

In June 2015, RCMP led police raids across the Greater Toronto Area, named Project OPhoenix, which resulted in the arrest of 19 men, allegedly affiliated with the 'Ndrangheta. In March 2018, during the resultant criminal trial north of Toronto, the court heard from a Carabinieri lieutenant-colonel that 'Ndrangheta is active in Germany, Australia and the Greater Toronto Area. "People in Italy have to be responsible for their representatives here but the final word comes from Italy". A member of the Greater Toronto Area's 'Ndrangheta cell, Carmine Guido, who had been a police informant, testified at length in 2018 about the structure and activities of the organization which had been under the control of Italian-born Bradford, Ontario resident, Giuseppe (Pino) Ursino and Romanian-born Cosmin (Chris) Dracea of Toronto. The latter two faced two counts of cocaine trafficking for the benefit of a criminal organization and one charge of conspiracy to commit an indictable offence. Guido was paid $2.4 million by the Royal Canadian Mounted Police between 2013 and 2015 to secretly tape dozens of conversations with suspected 'Ndrangheta members. In February 2019, Ursino was sentenced to 11 1/2 years in prison on drug trafficking charges, with Dracea sentenced to nine years in prison on cocaine trafficking conspiracy. Neither had a previous criminal record. At the sentencing, the presiding judge made this comment: "Based on the evidence at trial, Giuseppe Ursino is a high-ranking member of the 'Ndrangheta who orchestrated criminal conduct and then stepped back to lessen his potential implication. ... Cosmin Dracea knew he was dealing with members of a criminal organization when he conspired to import cocaine".

During the Ursino/Dracea trial, an Italian police expert testified that the 'Ndrangheta operated in the Greater Toronto Area and in Thunder Bay particularly in drug trafficking, extortion, loan sharking, theft of public funds, robbery, fraud, electoral crimes and crimes of violence. After the trial, Tom Andreopoulos, deputy chief federal prosecutor, said that this was the first time in Canada that the 'Ndrangheta was targeted as an organized crime group since 1997, when the Criminal Code was amended to include the offence of criminal organization. He offered this comment about the organization:

"We're talking about structured organized crime. We're talking about a political entity, almost; a culture of crime that colonizes across the sea from Italy to Canada. This is one of the most sophisticated criminal organizations in the world."

In June 2018, a Mafia expert wrote that "A new alliance between Bonanno associates and the Violi family ... is significant, as it suggests a growing prominence for Calabrian mafia – the 'Ndrangheta – within the New York families and in Canada". Criminologist Anna Sergi of the University of Essex added that drug trafficking was the most active pursuit in North America.

On 18 July 2019, the York Regional Police announced the largest organized crime bust in Ontario, part of an 18-month long operation called Project Sindicato that was also coordinated with the Italian State Police. York Regional Police had arrested 15 people in Canada, 12 people in Calabria, and seized $35 million worth of homes, sports cars and cash in a major trans-Atlantic probe targeting the most prominent wing of the 'Ndrangheta in Canada headed by Angelo Figliomeni. On 14 and 15 July, approximately 500 officers raided 48 homes and businesses across the GTA, seizing 27 homes worth $24 million, 23 cars, including five Ferraris, and $2 million in cash and jewelry. Nine of the 15 arrests in Canada included major crime figures: Angelo Figliomeni, Vito Sili, Nick Martino, Emilio Zannuti, Erica Quintal, Salvatore Oliveti, Giuseppe Ciurleo, Rafael Lepore and Francesco Vitucci. The charges laid included tax evasion, money laundering, defrauding the government and participating in a criminal organization.

During a press conference in Vaughan, Ontario, Fausto Lamparelli of the Italian State Police, offered this comment about the relationship between the 'Ndrangheta in Ontario and Calabria:

"This investigation allowed us to learn something new. The 'Ndrangheta crime families in Canada are able to operate autonomously, without asking permission or seeking direction from Italy. Traditionally, 'Ndrangheta clans around the world are all subservient to the mother ship in Calabria. It suggests the power and influence the Canadian-based clans have built."

On 9 August 2019, as part of the same joint investigation, several former Greater Toronto Area residents were arrested in Calabria, including Giuseppe DeMaria, Francesco Commisso, Rocco Remo Commisso, Antonio Figliomeni and Cosimo Figiomeni. Vincenzo Muià had visited Toronto on 31 March 2019 to meet with Angelo and Cosimo Figliomeni, seeking answers to who had ambushed and killed his brother, Carmelo Muià, in Siderno on 18 January 2018; Muià's smartphone was unwittingly and secretly transmitting his closed-door conversations to authorities in Italy.

In 2020, the charges laid against three individuals as a result of Project Sindicato were "stayed" (the prosecution discontinued), unless the prosecutors could find new evidence and proceeded with the charges again within one year. In January 2021, the charges against the remaining six were also stayed, including that of Angelo Figliomeni, "the head of the 'Ndrangheta in Toronto" according to York Regional Police. The charges were stayed after an investigation "into the use of the privileged conversations" that found "improper use of wiretapping" and "significant breaches of solicitor-client privilege". All property seized by police must now be returned – with the exception of illegal possessions.

=== Colombia ===
The 'Ndrangheta clans were closely associated with the AUC paramilitary groups led by Salvatore Mancuso, a son of Italian immigrants; he surrendered to Álvaro Uribe's government to avoid extradition to the U.S. According to Giuseppe Lumia of the Italian Parliamentary Antimafia Commission, 'Ndrangheta clans are actively involved in the production of cocaine. The Mancuso 'ndrina is a powerful 'Ndrangheta family.

=== Germany ===
According to a study by the German foreign intelligence service, the Bundesnachrichtendienst, 'Ndrangheta groups are using Germany to invest cash from drugs and weapons smuggling. Profits are invested in hotels, restaurants and houses, especially along the Baltic coast and in the eastern German states of Thuringia and Saxony. Investigators believe that the mafia's bases in Germany are used primarily for clandestine financial transactions. In 1999, the state Office of Criminal Investigation in Stuttgart investigated an Italian from San Luca who had allegedly laundered millions through a local bank, the Sparkasse Ulm. The man claimed that he managed a profitable car dealership, and authorities were unable to prove that the business was not the source of his money. The Bundeskriminalamt concluded in 2000 that "the activities of this 'Ndrangheta clan represent a multi-regional criminal phenomenon."

A war between the two 'Ndrangheta clans Pelle-Romeo (Pelle-Vottari) and Strangio-Nirta from San Luca that had started in 1991 in their home town in Calabria and resulted in several deaths, spilled into Germany in 2007; six men were shot dead in front of an Italian restaurant in Duisburg on 15 August 2007. (See San Luca feud.)

In 2009, a confidential report by the Bundeskriminalamt said some 'Ndrangheta families were living in Germany, and were involved in gun-running, money laundering, drug-dealing and racketeering, as well as legal businesses. Some 900 people were involved in criminal activity, and were also legal owners of hundreds of restaurants, as well as being major players in the property market in the former East. The most represented 'Ndrangheta family originated from the city of San Luca (Italy), with some 200 members in Germany. According to the head of the German federal police service, Jörg Ziercke, "Half of the criminal groups identified in Germany belong to the 'Ndrangheta. It has been the biggest criminal group since the 1980s. Compared to other groups operating in Germany, the Italians have the strongest organization."

=== Netherlands ===
Sebastiano Strangio allegedly lived for 10 years in the Netherlands, where he managed his contacts with Colombian cocaine cartels. He was arrested in Amsterdam on 27 October 2005. The seaports of Rotterdam and Amsterdam are used to import cocaine. The Giorgi, Nirta and Strangio clans from San Luca have a base in the Netherlands and Brussels (Belgium). In March 2012, the head of the Dutch National Crime Squad (Dienst Nationale Recherche, DNR) stated that the DNR will team up with the Tax and Customs Administration and the Fiscal Information and Investigation Service to combat the 'Ndrangheta.

=== Malta ===
David Gonzi, a son of former Prime Minister of Malta Lawrence Gonzi, was accused of illegal activities by acting as a trustee shareholder in a gaming company. The company in question was operated by a Calabrian associate of the 'Ndrangheta in Malta. His name appeared several times on an investigation document of over 750 pages that was commissioned by the tribunal of the Reggio Calabria. Gonzi called the document unprofessional. A European arrest warrant was published for Gonzi to appear at the tribunal but this never materialised. Gonzi, however, was completely exonerated from the list of potential suspects in the 'Ndrangheta gaming bust.

After investigation of the presence of the 'Ndrangheta, 21 gaming outlets had their operation license temporarily suspended in Malta due to irregularities in a period of one year.

In a Notice of the Conclusion of the Investigation dated 30 June 2016, criminal action was commenced in Italy against 113 persons originally mentioned in the investigation.

=== Mexico ===
According to some reports, the 'Ndrangheta works in conjunction with Mexican drug cartels in the drug trade, such as with the mercenary army known as Los Zetas.

=== Slovakia ===
In February 2018, Slovak investigative journalist Ján Kuciak was shot dead at his home together with his fiancée. At the time of his murder, Kuciak was working on a report about Slovak connections with the 'Ndrangheta. He had previously reported on organized tax fraud involving businesspeople close to the ruling Smer-SD party. On 28 February, Aktuality.sk published Kuciak's last, unfinished story. The article details the activities of Italian businessmen with ties to organised crime who have settled in eastern Slovakia, and have spent years embezzling European Union funds intended for the development of this relatively poor region, as well as their connections to high-ranking state officials, such as Viliam Jasaň, a deputy and the Secretary of the State Security Council of Slovakia, and Mária Trošková, a former nude model who became Chief Adviser of Prime Minister Robert Fico. Both Jasaň and Trošková took leave of absence on the same day, stating that they would return to their positions once the investigations were concluded.

=== Switzerland ===
The crime syndicate has a significant presence in Switzerland since the early 1970s but has operated there with little scrutiny due to the inconspicuous life styles of their members, the Swiss legal landscape, and solid foundations in local businesses. In the aftermath of the San Luca feud in 2007 and subsequent arrests in Italy (Operation "Crimine"), it became clear that the group had also infiltrated the economically proliferous regions of Switzerland and Southern Germany. In March 2016, Swiss law enforcement in cooperation with Italian state prosecutors arrested a total of 15 individuals, 13 in the city of Frauenfeld, 2 in the canton of Valais, accusing them of active membership to an organized crime syndicate also known as "Operazione Helvetica".

Since 2015, the Swiss federal police has conducted undercover surveillance and recorded the group's meetings in a restaurant establishment in a small village just outside of Frauenfeld. The meetings were taking place in a relatively remote location using the now defunct entity the "Wängi Boccia Club" as its cover. According to the Italian prosecutor Antonio De Bernardo, there are several cells operating within the jurisdiction of the Swiss Federation, estimating the number of operatives per cell to about 40, and a couple of 100 in total. All of the arrested persons are Italian citizens, the two men arrested in the Valais have already been extradited to Italy, and as of August 2016, one individual arrested in Frauenfeld has been approved for extradition to Italy.

=== United Kingdom ===
In London, the Aracri and Fazzari clans are thought to be active in money laundering, catering and drug trafficking.

=== United States ===
The earliest evidence of 'Ndrangheta activity in the U.S. points to an intimidation scheme run by the syndicate in Pennsylvania mining towns; this scheme was unearthed in 1906. Current 'Ndrangheta activities in the United States mainly involve drug trafficking, arms smuggling, and money laundering. It is known that the 'Ndrangheta branches in North America have been associating with Italian-American organized crime. The Suraci family from Reggio Calabria has moved some of its operations to the U.S. The family was founded by Giuseppe Suraci, who has been in the United States since 1962. His younger cousin, Antonio Rogliano runs the family in Calabria.

In February 2014, both FBI and Italian Police joint operation named New Bridge, intercepted the transatlantic network of U.S. and Italian crime families. The raid targeted the Gambino and Bonanno families in the U.S. while in Italy, it targeted the Ursino 'ndrina from Gioiosa Jonica. The defendants were charged with drug trafficking, money laundering and firearms offenses, based, in part, on their participation in a transnational heroin and cocaine trafficking conspiracy involving the 'Ndrangheta. The operation began in 2012 when investigators detected a plan by members of the Ursino clan of the 'Ndrangheta to smuggle large amounts of drugs. An undercover agent was dispatched to Italy and was successful in infiltrating the clan. An undercover agent was also involved in the handover of 1.3 kg of heroin in New York as part of the infiltration operation.

In June 2018, a Mafia expert wrote that "A new alliance between Bonanno associates and the Violi family, is significant, as it suggests a growing prominence for Calabrian mafia – the 'Ndrangheta – within the New York families and in Canada". Criminologist Anna Sergi of the University of Essex added that drug trafficking was the most active pursuit in North America.

=== Uruguay ===
On 24 June 2019, 'Ndrangheta leader Rocco Morabito, dubbed the "cocaine king of Milan", escaped from Central Prison in Montevideo, together with three other inmates, "through a hole in the roof of the building". Morabito was awaiting extradition to Italy for international drug trafficking, having been arrested at a Montevideo hotel in 2017 after living in Punta del Este under a false name for 13 years.

== In popular culture ==
Beginning in 2000, music producer Francesco Sbano released three CD compilations of Italian mafia folk songs over a five-year period. Collectively known as La musica della mafia, these compilations consist mainly of songs written by 'Ndrangheta musicians, often sung in Calabrian and dealing with themes such as vengeance (Sangu chiama sangu), betrayal (I cunfirenti), justice within the 'Ndrangheta (Nun c'è pirdunu), and the ordeal of prison life (Canto di carcerato). The 2013 book ZeroZeroZero by Roberto Saviano investigates the activities of the 'Ndrangheta in Italy. Stefano Sollima adapted the book into a 2020 TV series of the same name.

The popular Canadian crime drama series Bad Blood features the 'Ndrangheta as an important part of the series' storyline, as in the second season the series' main criminal organization, the Rizzuto crime family, led by Declan Gardiner (played by Kim Coates) becomes embroiled in a bloody mafia feud with two powerful 'Ndrangheta families: the Cosoleto crime family, led by brothers Domenic Cosoleto and Lorenzo "Enzo" Cosoleto (played by Louis Ferreira and Daniel Kash respectively) and the Langana crime family, whose Canadian branch is headed by Teresa Langana (played by Anna Hopkins) and her twin brother Christian Langana (played by Gianni Falcone), who are the children of the unnamed boss of the Langana crime family's main branch in Italy.

In 2023, the Italian-language TV series The Good Mothers depicting the 'Ndrangheta premiered. It was based on the novel of the same name by British author Alex Perry, and appeared in the 73rd Berlin International Film Festival.

== See also ==
- Camorra
- List of 'ndrine
- List of most wanted fugitives in Italy
- List of members of the 'Ndrangheta
- Museo della 'ndrangheta
- Toxic waste dumping by the 'Ndrangheta
- Sacra Corona Unita
- Sicilian Mafia
