= Church of Saint Mary of Portosalvo, Siderno =

Catholic Church in Calabria, Southern Italy

Church of Saint Mary of Portosalvo Chiesa di Santa Maria di Portosalvo
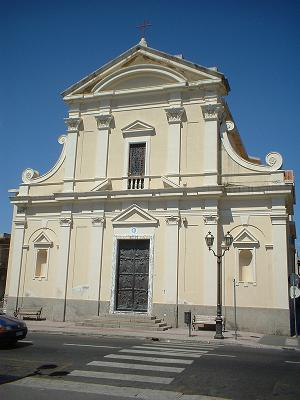
- Church of Saint Mary of Portosalvo's facade

Religion
- Affiliation: Roman Catholic
- Province: Diocese of Locri-Gerace
- Rite: Roman Rite

Location
- Location: Siderno, Italy
- Interactive map of Church of Saint Mary of Portosalvo Chiesa di Santa Maria di Portosalvo
- Coordinates: 38°16′0″N 16°17′44″E

Architecture
- Type: Church
- Style: Neoclassicism (Facade); Baroque (Intern)

The Church of Saint Mary of Portosalvo (Italian: Chiesa di Santa Maria di Portosalvo) is a Neoclassical church with predominant Baroque elements, located in Siderno, in the Metropolitan City of Reggio Calabria, Calabria, Southern Italy.

Its main artistic features include the statue of Saint Mary, the bronze portal and the decorative and pictorial cycle, which contains numerous works inspired by Raphael, Murillo, Tiepolo, Velázquez, Guido Reni, and Mattia Preti.

The church is situated in front of Portosalvo Square, in the modern part of the city known as Siderno Marina, near the Costa dei Gelsomini.

The origins of the church date back to the 17th century. The exact year of construction and its original location remain unknown due to the series of 1783 Calabrian earthquakes. The original structure did not survive these events and was subsequently rebuilt.

In 1908, the church was again damaged by an earthquake, followed by a fire in 1921. As a result of this damage, the old church was demolished and a new one was built. Work began in 1929 and the new church was put into use in 1944.

== Location ==
The church dedicated to Saint Mary of Portosalvo is located in the centre of Siderno Marina. Siderno (Sidernu or Siderni in Calabrian, Sideròni in Calabrian Greek) is an Italian municipality of 18,231 inhabitants situated in the Metropolitan City of Reggio Calabria.

The church is located in the oldest part of the town, located on a hill at 192 meters above sea level, known as Siderno Superiore, above the modern part, called Siderno Marina, developed near the Costa dei Gelsomini. The ancient part is characterized by 18th-century noble palaces, with distinctive barrel balconies and stone portals.

Siderno is a town with uncertain origins. The original city walls, which protected the upper part of the settlement in the 16th century, have now almost entirely disappeared. Archaeological evidence indicates a Greek presence between the 8th and 6th centuries B.C., followed by a Roman presence. Siderno is first mentioned in written sources in 1220, when it appears in Swabian records. The upper part of the town is shaped like a Byzantine kastron. Originally built as a fortress, it served as protection for both the residents and the authorities over the centuries. During the Middle Ages, it also sheltered people fleeing from the Saracen invasions.

The Parish Church of Santa Maria di Portosalvo is one of several religious buildings in Siderno Superiore, which also include Santa Maria dell’Arco and San Nicola di Bari. It is in proximity to the historic Palazzo De Mojà, a Spanish-era residence featuring distinctive stone balconies. Recently restored, it now hosts various cultural events. Other buildings of historical relevance are historic noble residences, such as the 17th century Palazzo Falletti and Palazzo Calautti, as well as Palazzo Correale-Santacroce, known for its unique sculpture depicting three human faces.

== History ==
=== 1783–1819 ===
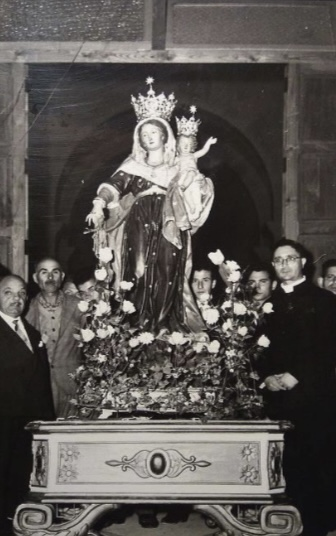
Old picture of the statue of Saint Mary in Siderno

The precise origins of the Church of Saint Mary of Portosalvo, including the date of its first construction and the location of the original chapel, remain uncertain. This uncertainty is largely due to the 1783 earthquakes that struck southern Calabria, initiating a long seismic period that has been described as the most devastating catastrophe to affect southern Italy in the 18th century.

After the earthquake, many residents began moving to Marina di Siderno, resulting in population growth in the area and the consequent expansion of the church.

Reconstruction works took place between 1808 and 1809. The new church featured three naves, three entrance doors, a dome over the presbytery and a bell gable. On the main altar there was an antique painting depicting the church's patroness, Saint Mary of Portosalvo, who would later become the official patron saint of Siderno.

In 1819, a new statue of Saint Mary of Portosalvo, created by Francesco Verzella, was introduced to replace the original painting which had been lost.

By the early 19th century, the church had become a central point for the growing coastal community of Siderno. Its significance continued to increase throughout the following decades, leading to further architectural and spiritual developments in the mid-19th century.

=== 1840–1846 ===
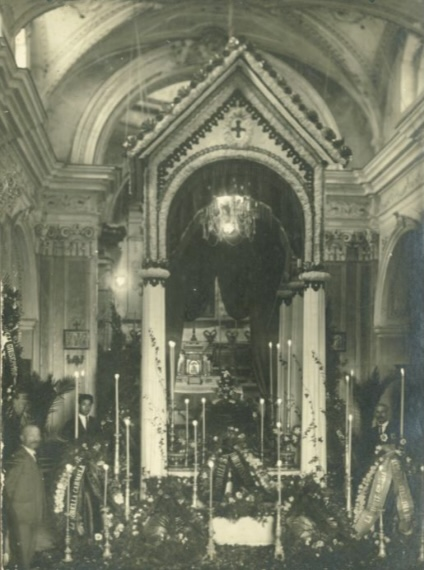
Altar of the Church of Saint Mary of Portosalvo before reconstruction

The population of Siderno grew and the town's increasing prominence attracted the attention of local aristocrats. On 19 May 1846, the church was visited by the Royal Family of Naples, including King Ferdinand II, Maria Theresa of Austria, and the future King Francis II of the Two Sicilies. After arriving in Siderno aboard a steam frigate, they traveled to Agnana to tour a newly opened coal mine. That afternoon, they returned to the port, where they were welcomed by Bishop Perrone before proceeding to the church.

The royal visit made a strong impression on the townspeople, who were struck by the family's public display of faith. The visit of the Royal Family of Naples and the large crowd it attracted demonstrated that the church was far too small to accommodate such gatherings.

In the decades following the royal visit, the church continued to serve as the spiritual and social centre of Siderno. By the early 20th century, structural deterioration and natural events posed challenges to its preservation.

=== 1908–1934 ===
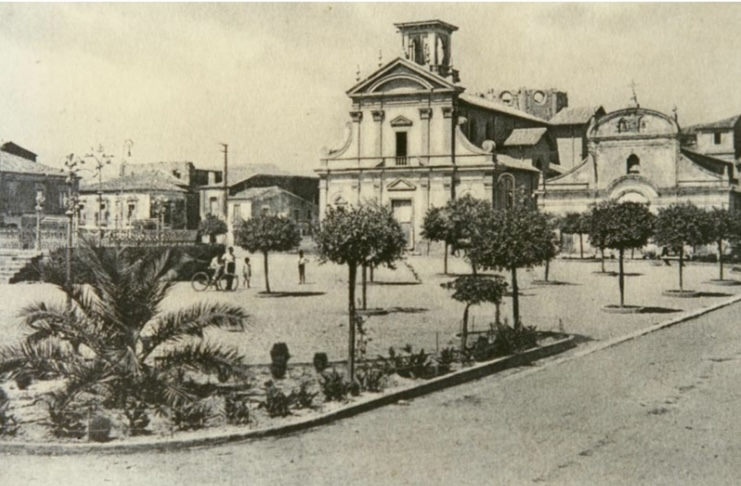
Pictures of the two Churches during the short period of time when they coexisted in Siderno

In 1908, the Messina earthquake caused further damage to the church, and thirteen years later, in 1921, a fire severely damaged the building. It took an additional two years for the state to grant permission for repairs, delaying the church's return to active use.

In 1923, it was decided that a new church would be built to replace the old, heavily damaged one. The planning stage of the church's construction faced numerous delays. The construction did not begin until 14 August 1929. Problems continued throughout the building process. In 1934, a public meeting was held during which Archbishop Raschellà addressed the community's concerns, explaining that the principal cause of the delay was the intention to enlarge the church to better accommodate the growing population.

=== 1944–1959 ===
During the summer of 1944, the new church was opened for worship, as the old one, previously damaged by fire, had been declared unsafe by the city authorities. The old church was demolished between 1944 and 1946, and some of its materials were reused in the construction of the new building.

On 22 April 1953, the church was consecrated. Father Antonio Incognito was appointed archpriest following the death of Archpriest Raschellà in 1954.

In 1959, a marble column was erected on the site of the old church. Featuring an engraved inscription and topped with a statue of the Madonna, it symbolises the site's sacred significance to the people of Siderno.

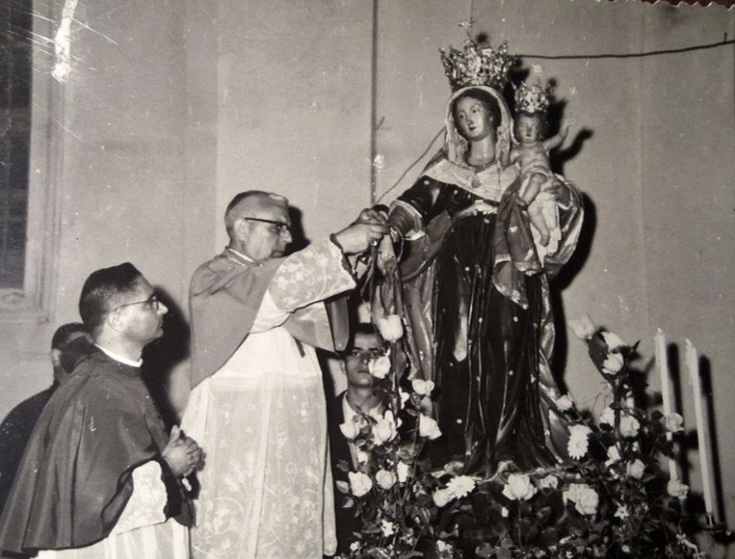
Old photo of the statue of Saint Mary being baptized by the local priest in Siderno

=== 1959–1999 ===
As the new archpriest, Father Antonio Incognito oversaw a significant part of the church's renovation. During his tenure, new flooring, stained-glass windows, and marble decorations were added. He also proposed the installation of a bronze main door. He died on 20 December 1987, before the project was completed.

In February 1988, the bronze door selected by Father Antonio Incognito was blessed and installed. Further renovations took place between 1988 and 1989, focusing primarily on the exterior. Some of these renovations involved changing the roofing and replacing the gutters.

From 1990 to 1999, the interior was decorated with paintings by the artist Guido Faita, commissioned by the new parish priest, Father Giovanni Musolino of the Order of Friars Minor Capuchin. Additional renovations were carried out during the same period. These were mainly concerning the interior of the church and were done under the direction of the new archpriest, Monsignor Cornelio Femia, who was appointed in 1996.

=== 2000–2015 ===
Between 2001 and 2002, restoration work was carried out inside the church to address issues caused by rising damp. Under the supervision of architect Umberto Panetta, the old flooring was removed and replaced with a ventilated foundation system and an innovative underfloor climate-control installation. The interior was updated with new marble paving featuring decorative inlays, marble baseboards along the aisles and columns, and a redesigned presbytery area.

In 2012, deterioration was observed on the church facade, where structural damage and falling debris posed safety concerns. Monsignor Femia commissioned architect Panetta to design a restoration project, which was later approved and co-founded by the Italian Episcopal Conference (CEI).

That same year, structural issues were also identified in the bell tower. As a result, the restoration plan was revised to include both the facade and the bell tower. Approved in 2014, the project began shortly afterward and included the repair and reinforcement of damaged concrete, anti-corrosion treatment of metal elements, protection of exposed surfaces, and repainting. A new main staircase with two side ramps was constructed, and both the structure and balustrade of the bell tower were restored. The work was completed in December 2015.

== Architecture ==
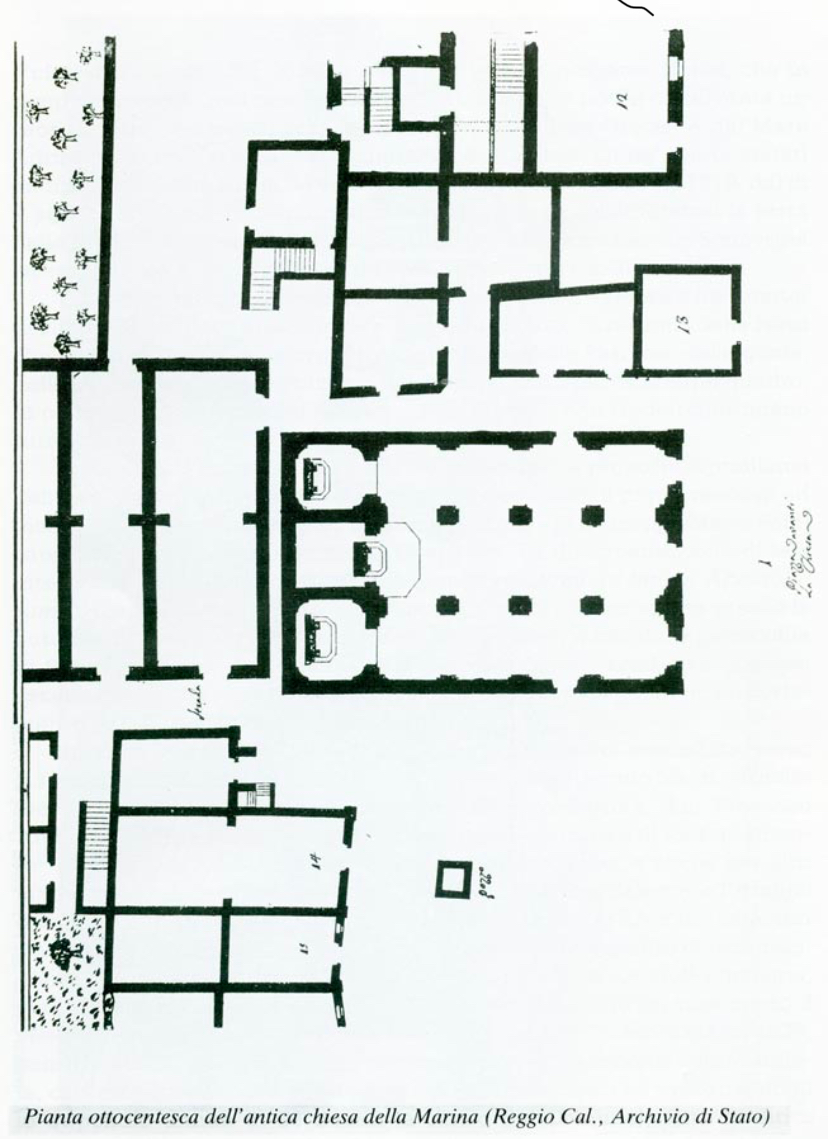
Site plan of the Church of Saint Mary of Portosalvo before reconstruction

According to parish and municipal documentation, the Church of Saint Mary of Portosalvo incorporates elements associated with Baroque and Neoclassical styles, with a façade constructed from pietra serena. The current structure dates from the early 20th century, when the earlier building was demolished and replaced by a new church.

The façade is organised symmetrically on two levels and includes a triangular pediment and a bronze main door created by the local sculptor Giuseppe Correale. Above the entrance is a stained-glass window representing Saint Mary of Portosalvo, designed by Guido Polloni of Florence.

Parish sources describe the interior as having an open and luminous layout, with spatial proportions recalling Renaissance models. The liturgical furnishings, made of Carrara marble, were produced by Tuscan artisans. Bronze sculptures such as The Supper at Emmaus (2009) and The Sower (2007) are the work of Rosario La Seta.

The marble flooring includes decorative inlays added in 2002, featuring the Jubilee 2000 emblem in coloured marble.

Further renovations and artistic additions were carried out during the 20th century, giving the building its present appearance. The church consists of a central nave flanked by two side aisles, forming a three-nave plan.

The interior space features rounded arches supported by slender columns, as documented in parish descriptions, and a high vaulted ceiling. Natural light enters through tall arched windows and a central stained-glass window.

The apse area contains the main marble altar dedicated to the Virgin Mary, surrounded by ornamental stuccoes and gilded reliefs combined with 20th-century additions, including bronze and wrought-iron liturgical furnishings.

Adjacent to the main structure stands a square bell tower approximately 33 metres high, according to municipal documentation. Its simple and functional design complements the façade and serves as a landmark on the town's coastal skyline.

== Decorative and Pictorial Cycle ==
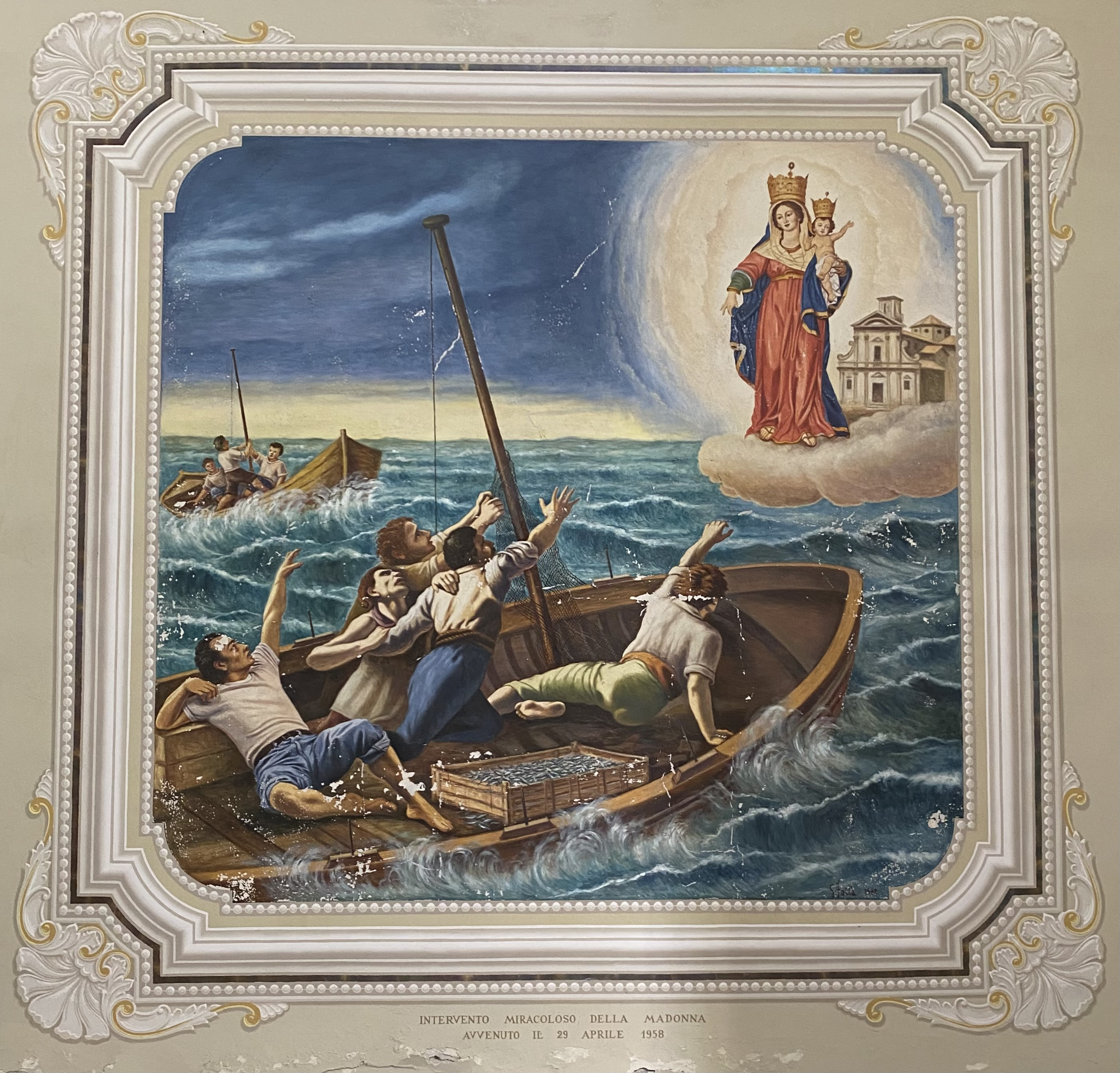
Miracle of the Virgin of Portosalvo, a scene associated with local devotional tradition.

The interior of the Church of Saint Mary of Portosalvo is decorated with a comprehensive pictorial program executed by the contemporary artist Guido Faita. Using trompe-l'œil techniques, Faita created architectural frameworks, ornamental motifs, and narrative scenes that unify the interior decoration.

Independent documentation notes that the decoration includes Marian and Christological themes, reinterpretations of well-known artworks, and elements inspired by Baroque and Renaissance models.

Among the most prominent elements are the apse decoration inspired by Raphael's Disputation of the Sacrament, the dome painting of the Assumption of the Virgin, and the large compositions in the transept, including a representation of the Pentecost and a scene traditionally known as the “Miracle of the Virgin of Portosalvo,” rooted in local religious devotion.

Other portions of the decorative cycle include depictions of the Evangelists, Marian iconography connected to the title Stella Maris, and thematic decorations in the chapels and choir loft, where Saint Cecilia and Saint Francis of Assisi are represented in accordance with traditional Catholic iconography.

== Saint Mary Statue ==
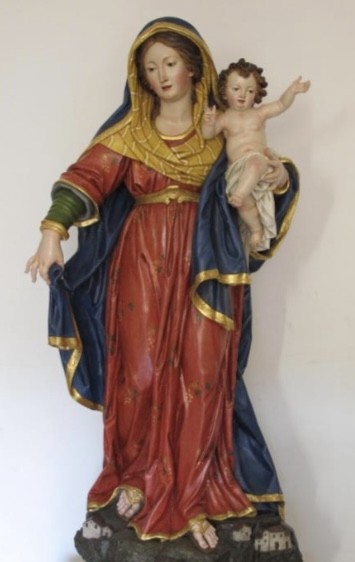
Saint Mary of Portosalvo Statue at Church of Saint Mary of Portosalvo, Siderno

The Church of Saint Mary of Portosalvo houses a wooden statue of Saint Mary also known as Our Lady of Portosalvo. This statue was created in 1819 by the Neapolitan sculptor Francesco Verzella.

The statue remains in excellent condition due to ongoing maintenance work. These interventions include a repainting carried out in 1985 by Dimitri Vakalis and other additional work, in 2002, to improve the statue's stability and in 2019, by Gianpaolo Leone, to prevent deterioration.

Viewed from the front, the statue gives the impression of dynamic movement, as the Virgin is seen as if she is about to take a step forward. It is balanced in motion: the right arm and left leg are both in front of the figure, while the left arm and right leg are behind. There are dual expressions on her face, stern on one side and lenient on the other.

== Bronze Portal of the Church ==
The bronze portal of the Church of Saint Mary of Portosalvo, created in 1987 by the local architect and sculptor Giuseppe Correale, is divided into eight panels. The first four illustrate episodes of Mariology.

The first panel depicts The Angel's Annunciation (L'Annunciazione dell'Angelo). The second one represents The Nativity of Jesus (La Natività di Gesù), which took place in the 1st century. The third panel reproduces The Flight into Egypt (La Fuga in Egitto), undertaken by the Holy Family to escape the Massacre of the Innocents, and the fourth shows The Visitation of the Blessed Virgin Mary (La Visitazione della Beata Vergine Maria) to her relative Elizabeth after the Annunciation.

The remaining four panels reproduce other significant religious episodes. Panel five, The Wedding at Cana (Le Nozze di Cana), commemorates the first miracle of Jesus. The sixth panel describes The Deposition from the Cross (La Deposizione dalla Croce), and the seventh, The Pentecost (La Pentecoste), recalls the feast of the Holy Spirit. The eighth and final panel depicts The Assumption of Mary (L'Assunzione di Maria) into Heaven, which happened after her death.

The artwork was made possible through a donation by Joe Vumbaca, a Siderno resident who was devoted to the town's patron saint, the collaboration of Monsignor Antonino Incognito with a citizens' committee, and the support of architect Correale. To realise the entire bronze portal, additional funds were needed and for this reason Correale, after accepting a modest compensation, created a miniature version of one of the panels for sale and later used the proceeds to cast the full-scale bronze panels and complete the portal.

In 2017, thirty years after its creation, a restoration conducted by Rosario La Seta, a former student of Correale, was made to remove the yellowed acrylic resins and the several layers of dust that had accumulated over the years on the bronze panels. After this, the existing oxidation was treated with specific solvents and some holes in the bronze panels were grouted.

The restoration work returned the portal to its original construction and also revealed previously hidden iconographic details. For example, the depictions of Saint Mary of Portosalvo between two angels and of a fisherman named “Cola”, a figure familiar to all residents of Siderno, were discovered in one of the two panels at the bottom.

In order to understand some artistic techniques implemented by Correale, an investigation has been carried out by taking essential information from Francesco Correale, the sculptor's son, and by analysing samples taken from the portal itself.

== Saint Mary of Portosalvo Celebrations ==
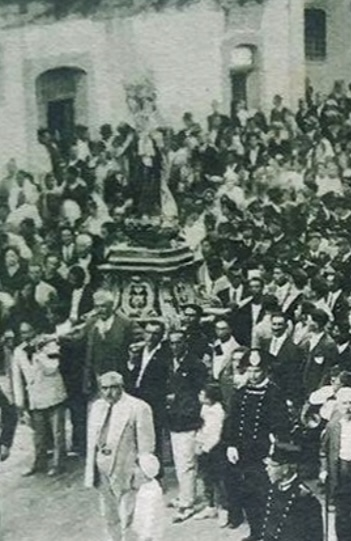
Old photo of the statue of Saint Mary during the procession in Siderno

The parish of Saint Mary of Portosalvo holds several annual celebrations, between the end of August and the beginning of September. These festivities include both religious and secular events.

In 1819, a wooden statue was commissioned from the Neapolitan sculptor Francesco Verzella. That same year, King Ferdinand IV of Bourbon issued a Royal Decree authorising Marina di Siderno to hold a fair in honour of its patron saint, scheduled from 4 to 8 September.

Historical records indicate that by the early 19th century, the celebration and the fair were already well-attended local events.

The fair featured goods supplied by local and regional merchants rather than imported items. Traders came from nearby areas, including the argagnari from Seminara, known for their pottery, and the casciari (comes from the calabrian dialect word casciaru, meaning cheesemaker) from Serra San Bruno. The items sold included household goods such as clay and terracotta objects, amphorae, jars, storage containers, and fresh produce. Many exchanges took place through bartering, often involvingproducts like potatoes, legumes, and beans traded for lemons, olive oil and salted anchovies.

Over time, the festival developed a strong commercial character while maintaining its religious foundation. Despite the growing presence of commercial activities, religious celebrations still retain their primacy over other aspects of the festivity.

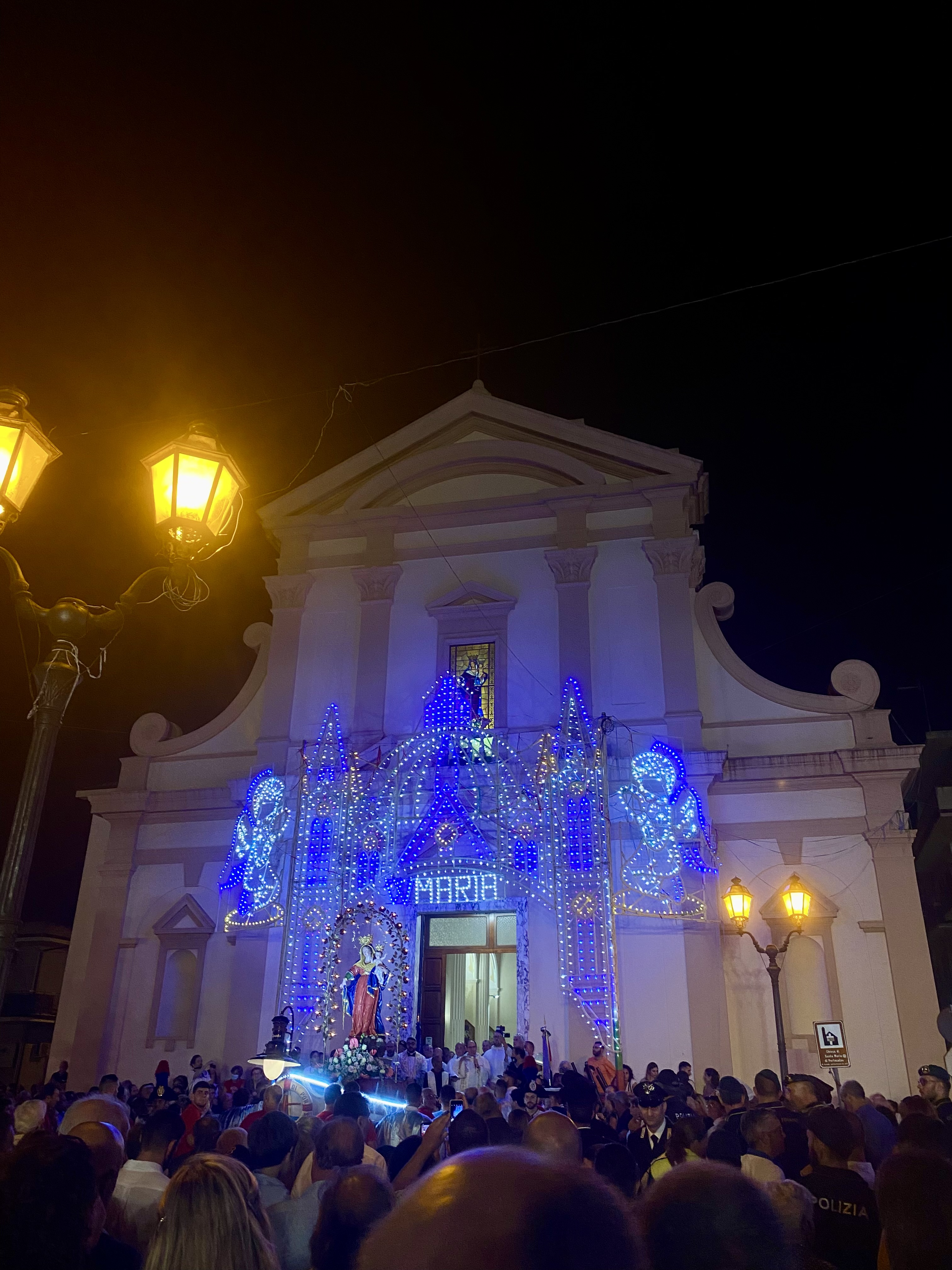
Picture of the Church of Saint Mary of Portosalvo during the celebration of Saint Mary, Siderno

In the present day, the festival is a major event that preserves two key components: one religious and the other secular.

The religious aspect centers on the procession on September 7, during which the statue is carried to the shore of the Ionian Sea, followed by a regatta and a mass celebration on the beach. On September 8, a second procession carries the statue through the main streets of Siderno.

From August 30 to September 7, each evening is marked by “the hour of company” ("l’ura i cummari" in Calabrian dialect), a period of communal prayer, hymns, and reflections often recited in the local dialect. During these gatherings, participants read meditations and invocations written in the 1940s by Monsignor Raschellà, which reflecting on both religious devotion and social themes.

== Miracle of Saint Mary ==
Several local traditions and popular beliefs are associated with the Church of Saint Mary of Portosalvo.

According to one of the most well-known stories, in November 1763 a fishing boat was caught in a violent storm off the coast of Santa Teresa, near Via Savoca. As the legend recounts, the captain and crew prayed to the Madonna of Portosalvo for protection, after which the sea reportedly calmed, allowing them to reach the shore safely. Since then, the Madonna of Portosalvo has been venerated in the area as the protector of fishermen.

== Gallery ==
=== Interior of the Church ===
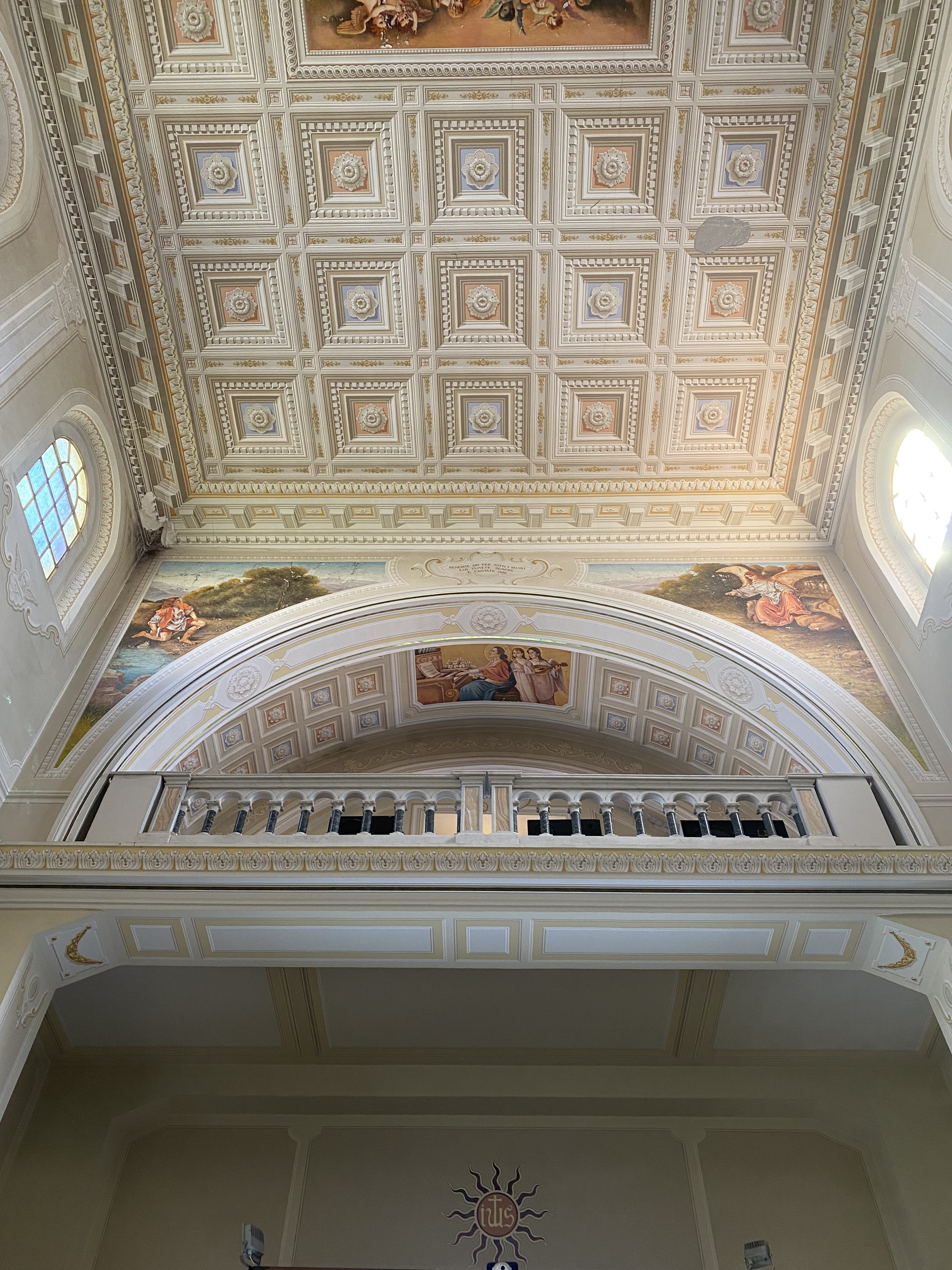
Entrance of the Church of Saint Mary of Portosalvo, Siderno

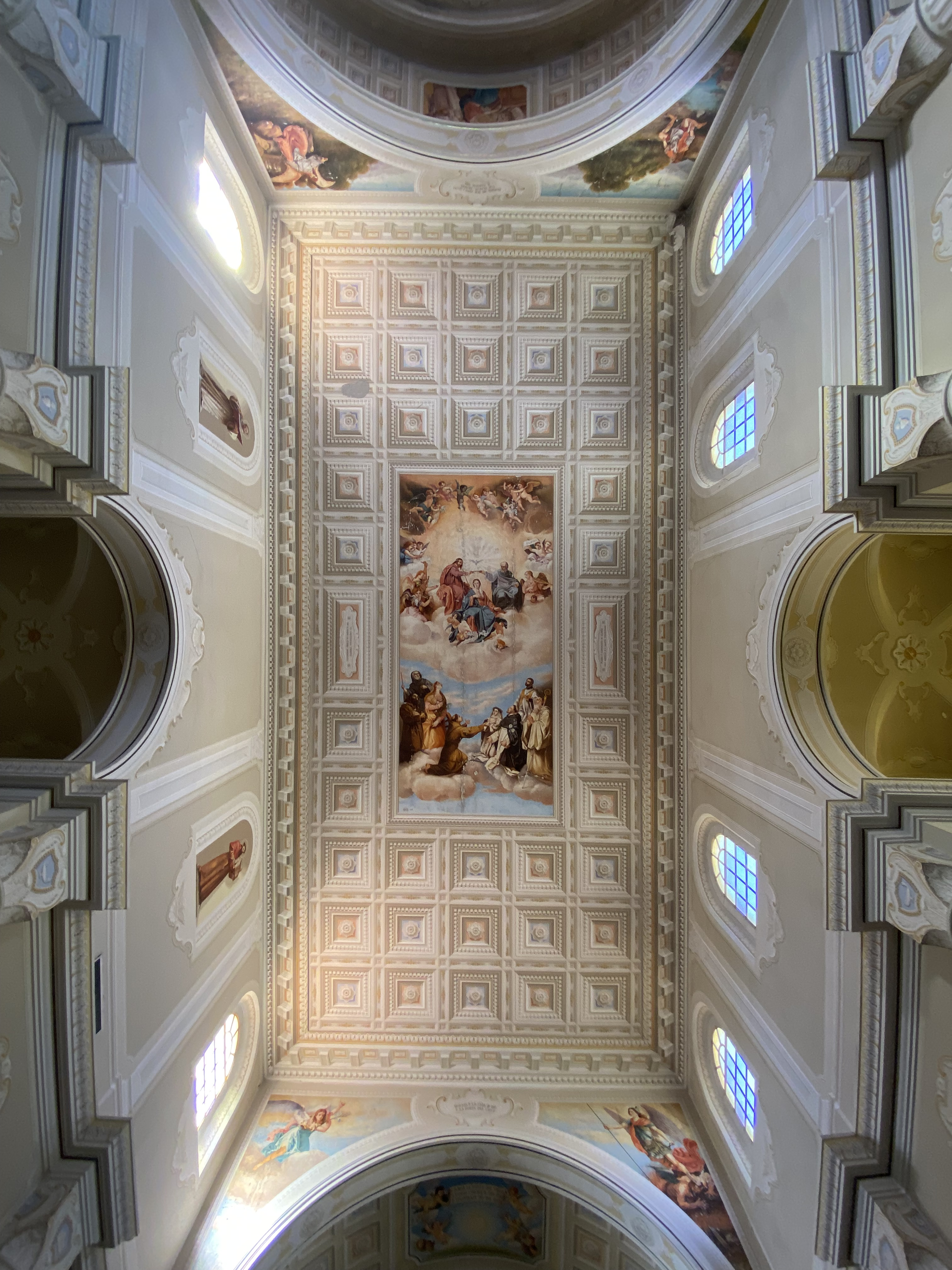
Ceiling of the Church of Saint Mary of Portosalvo, Siderno

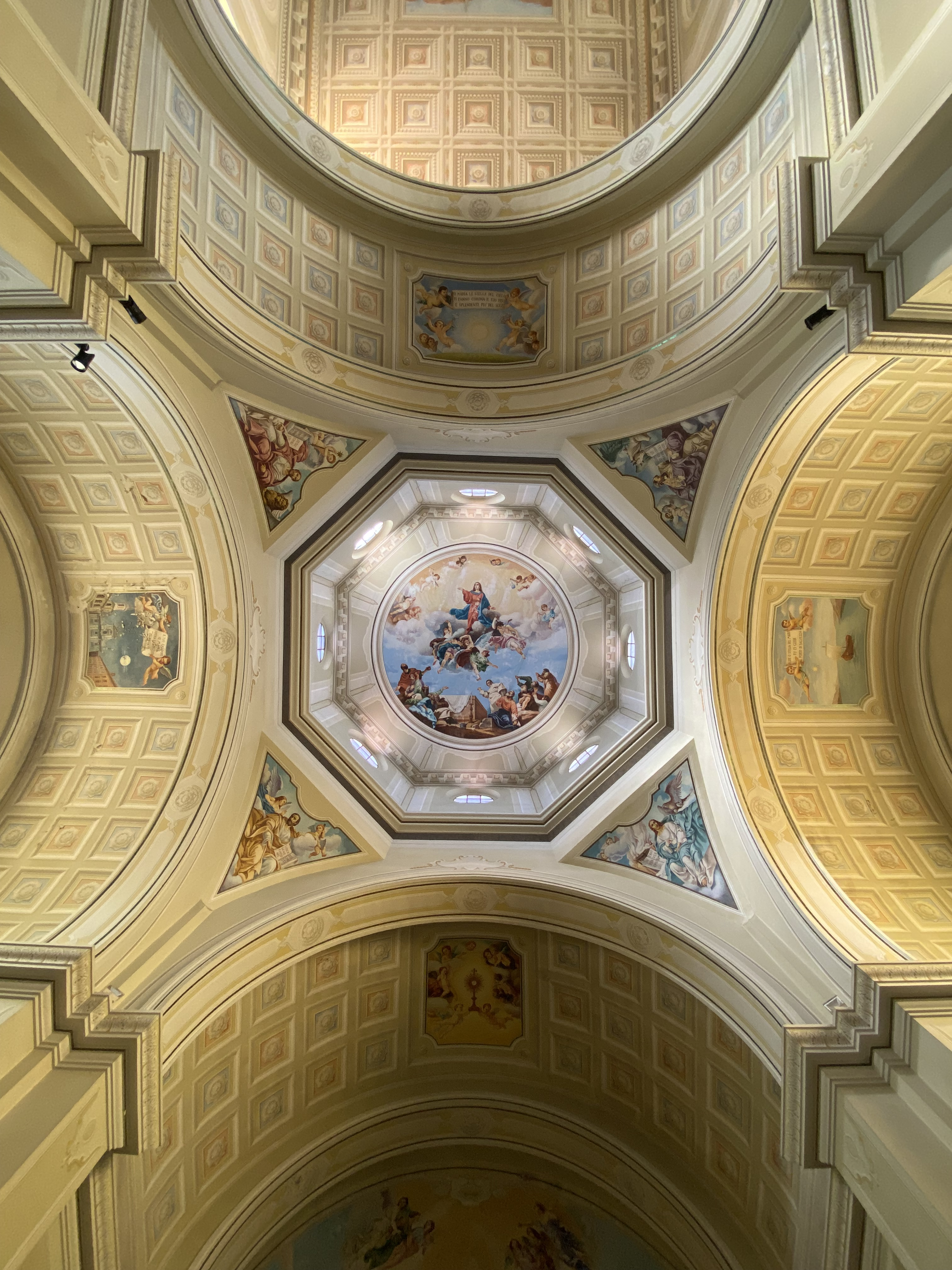
Prospective of the ceiling of the Church of Saint Mary of Portosalvo, Siderno

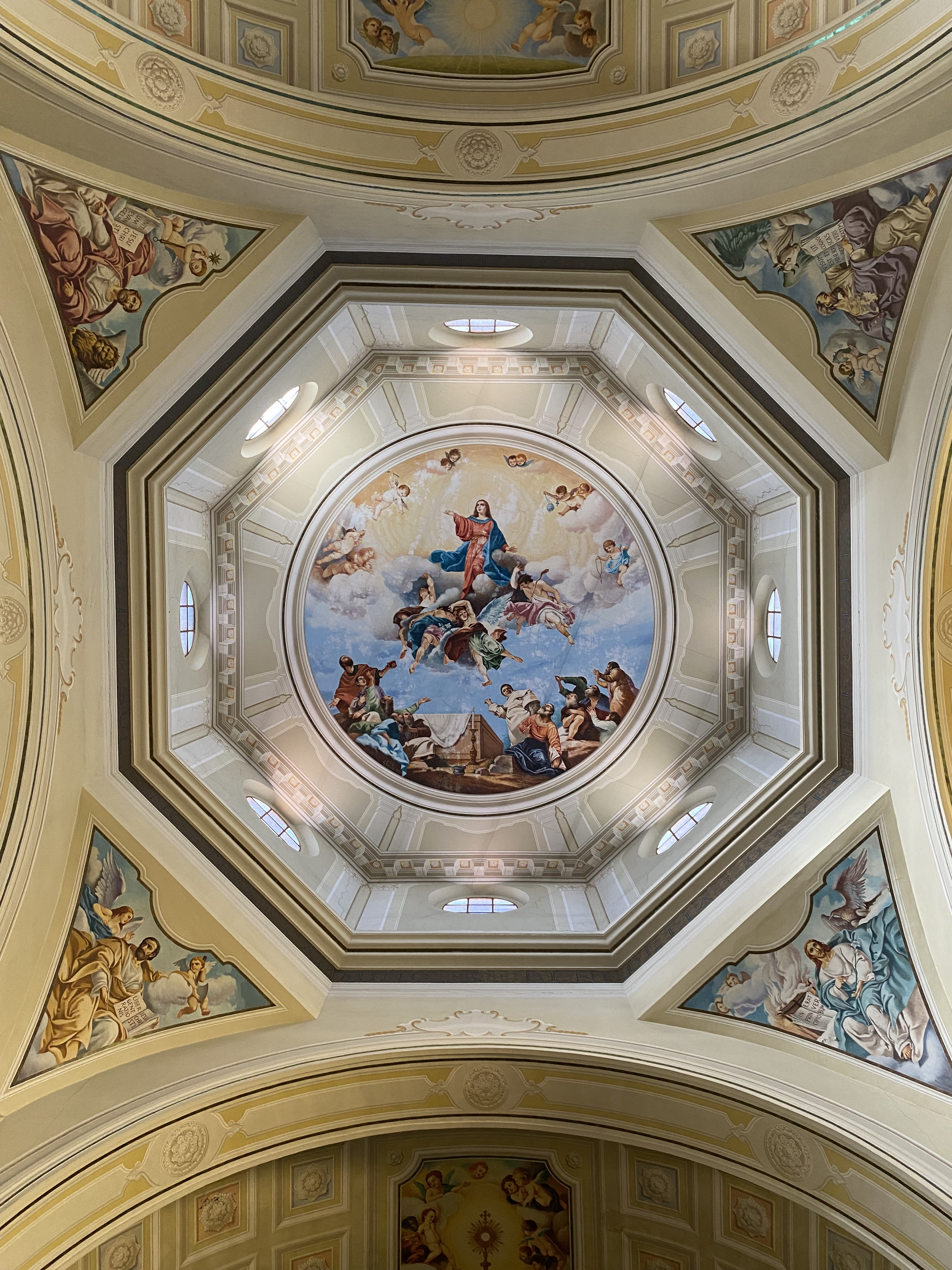
Assumption of the Virgin painting at the Church of Saint Mary of Portosalvo, Siderno

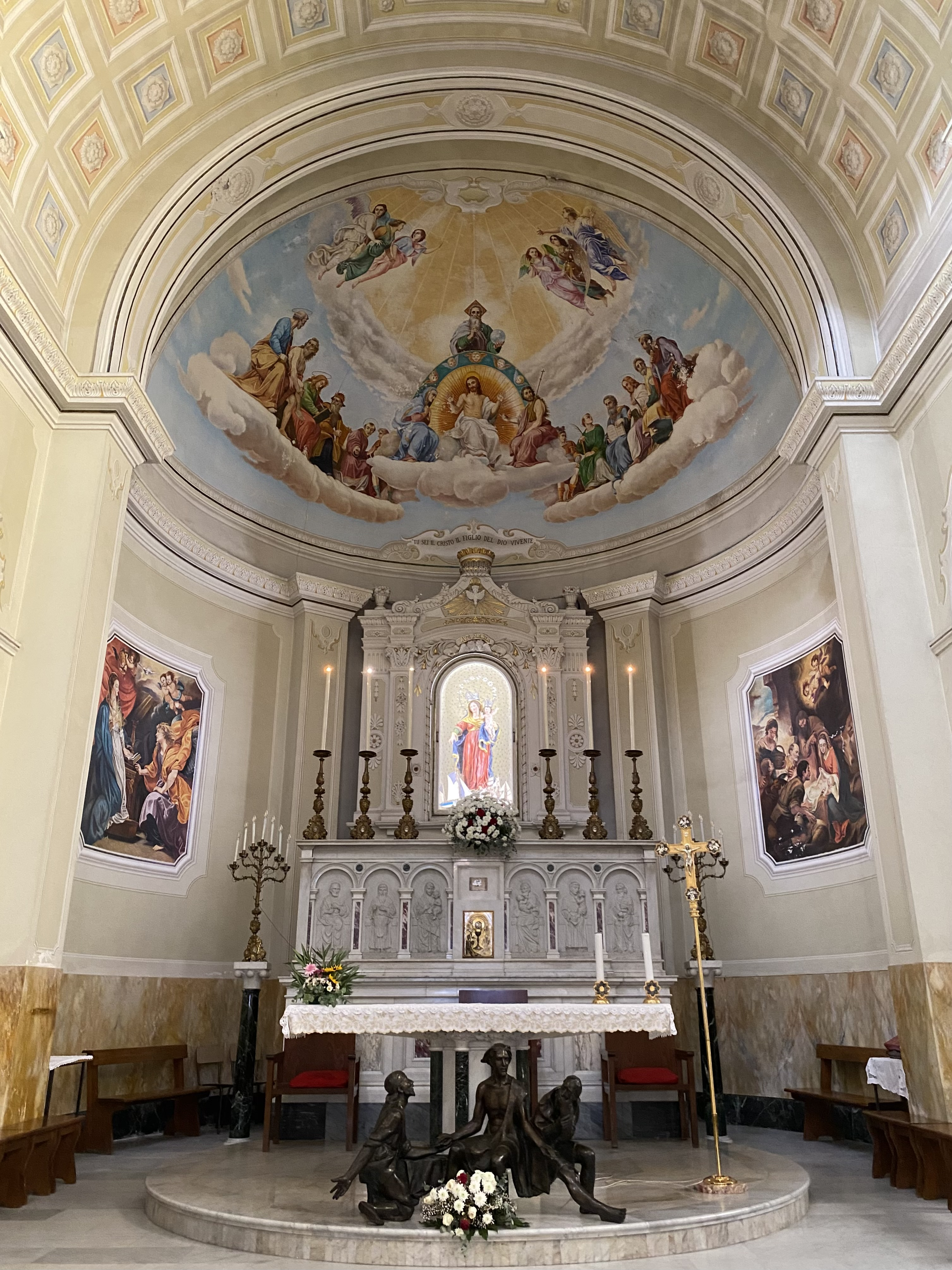
Disputation of the Sacrament painting at the Church of Saint Mary of Portosalvo, Siderno

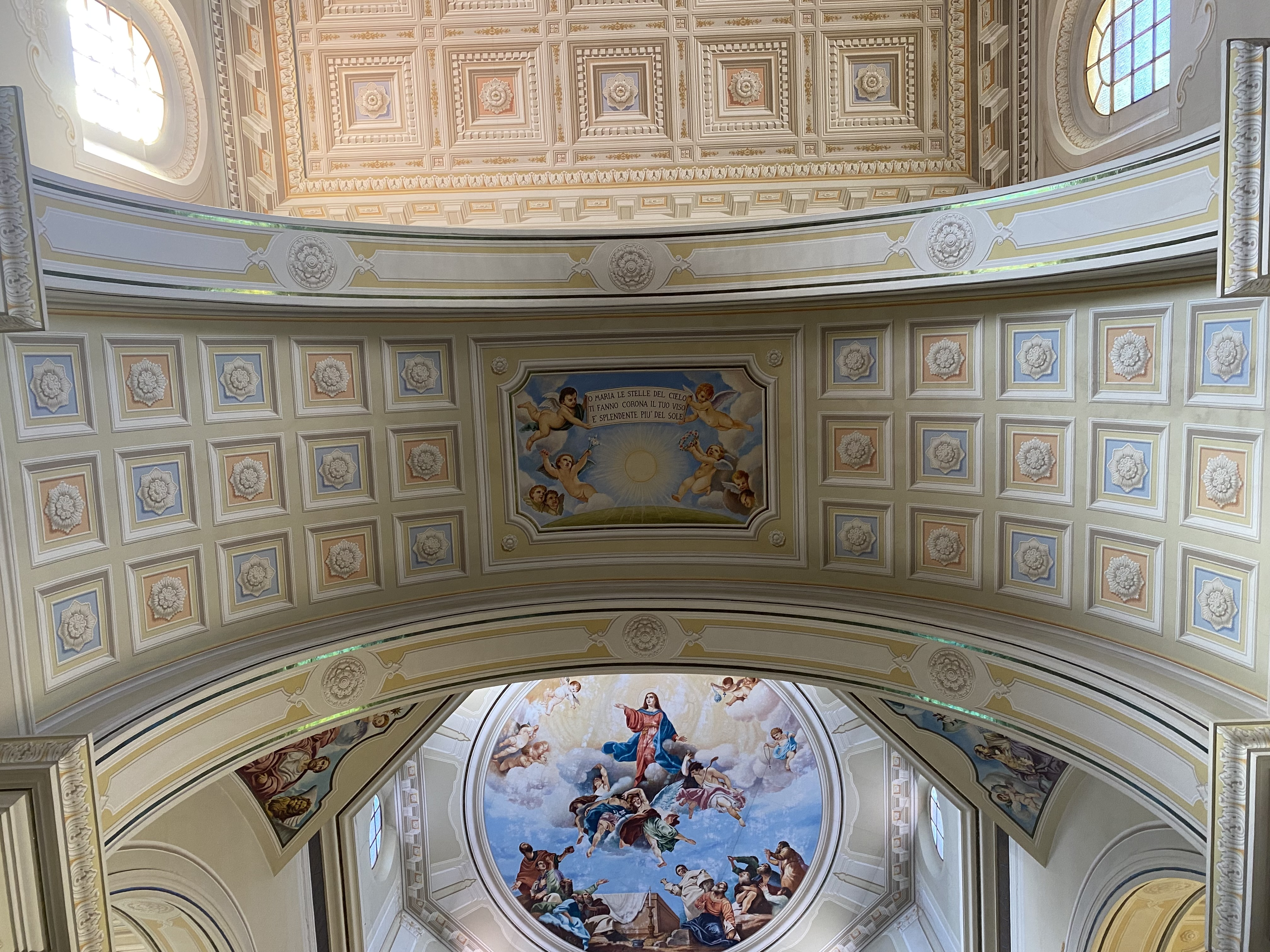
Writing on the ceiling of the Church of Saint Mary of Portosalvo, Siderno

=== Bronze Portal of The Church ===
==== Mariological and other significant religious episodes' panels ====
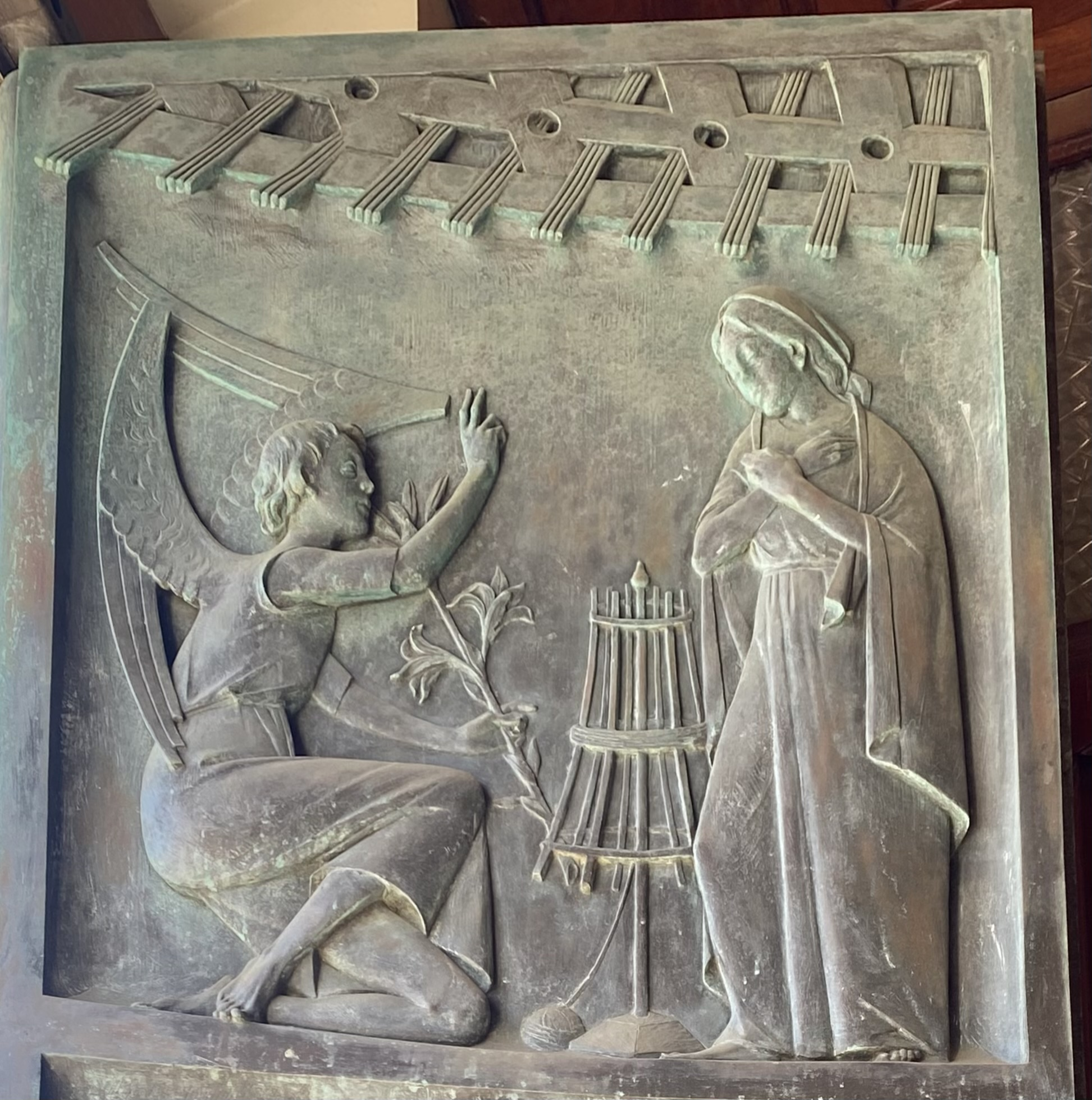
The Angel's Annunciation panel at the Church of Saint Mary of Portosalvo, Siderno

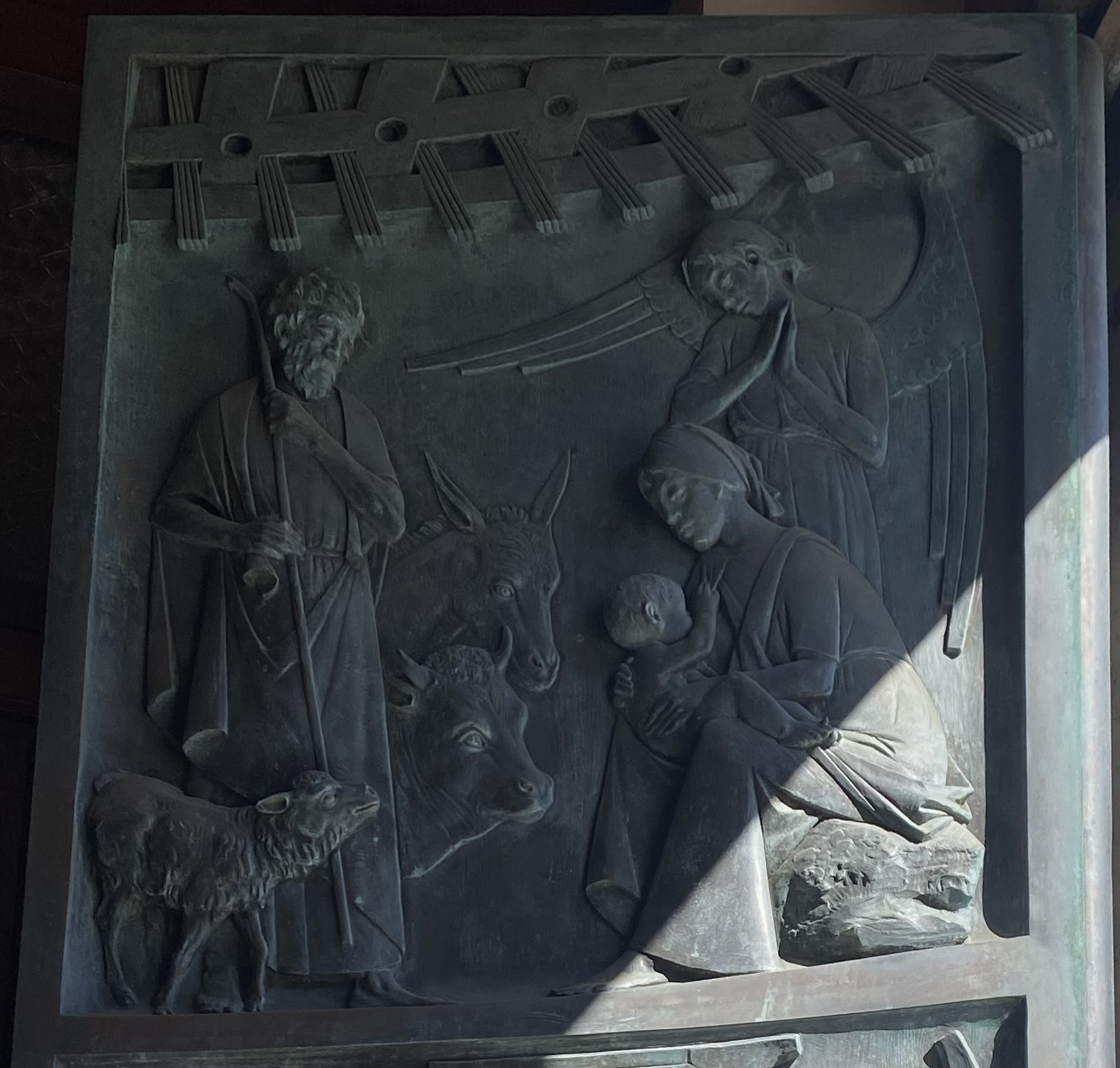
The Nativity of Jesus panel at the Church of Saint Mary of Portosalvo, Siderno

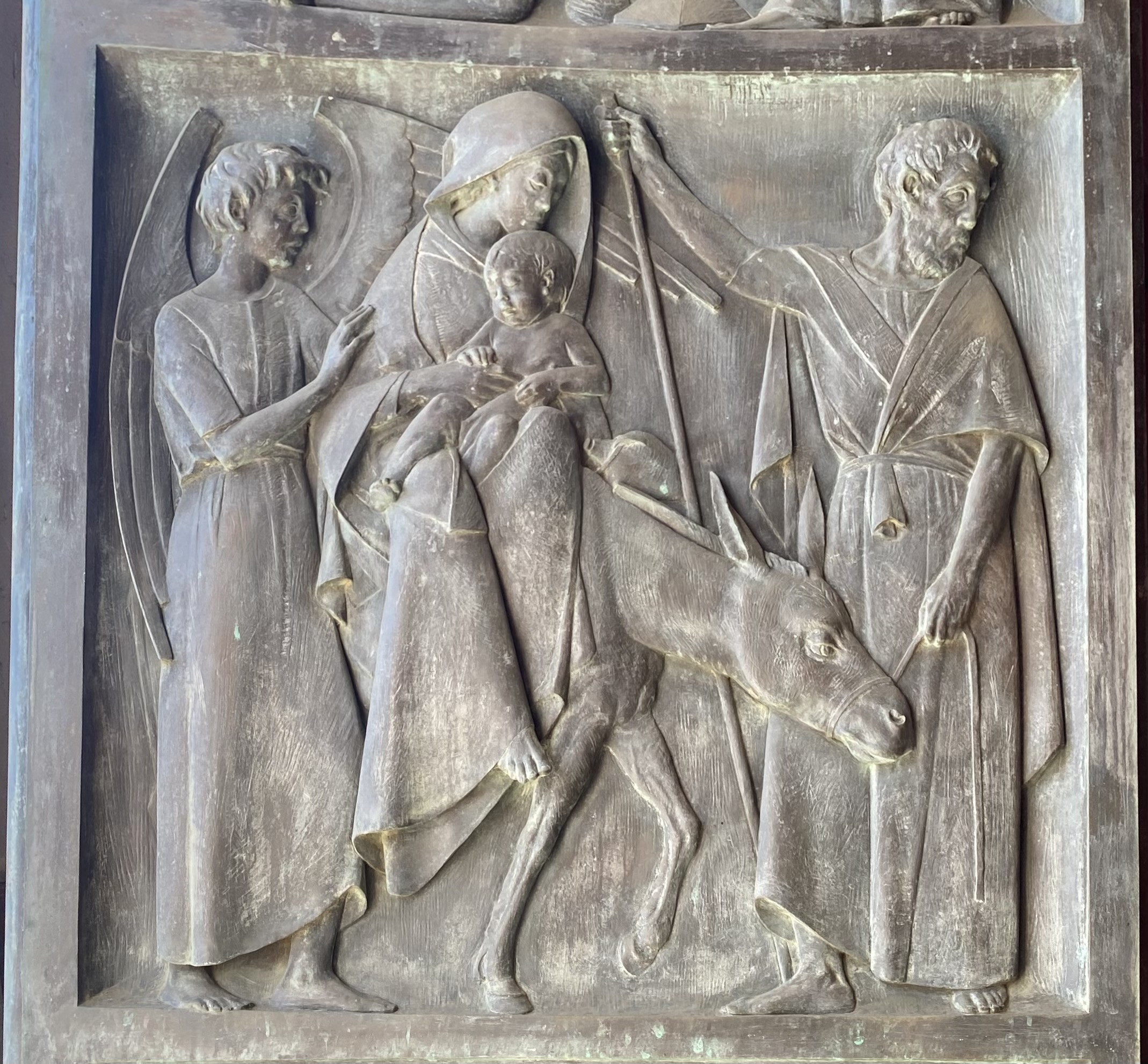
The Flight into Egypt panel at the Church of Saint Mary of Portosalvo, Siderno

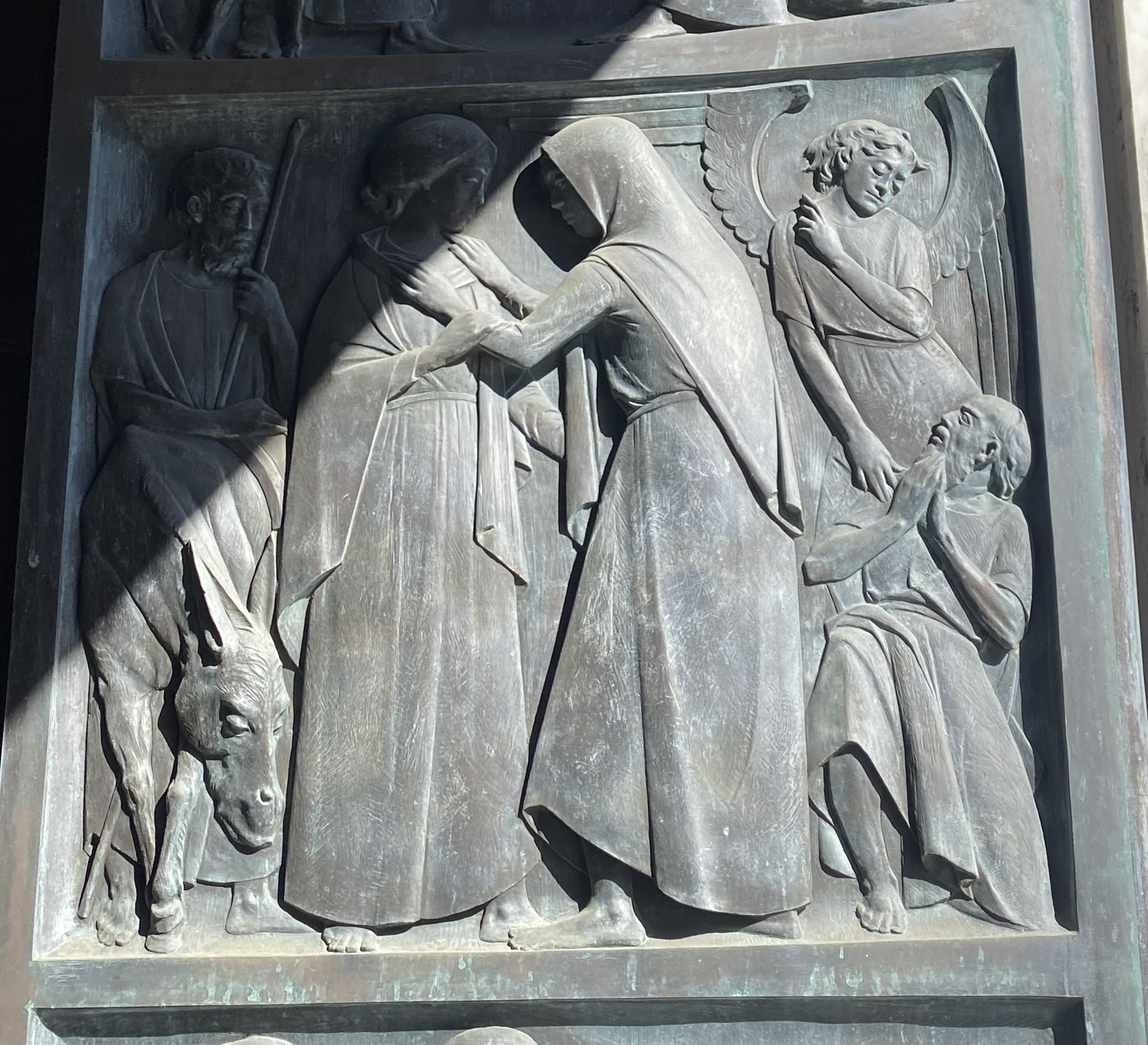
The Visitation of the Blessed Virgin Mary panel at the Church of Saint Mary of Portosalvo, Siderno

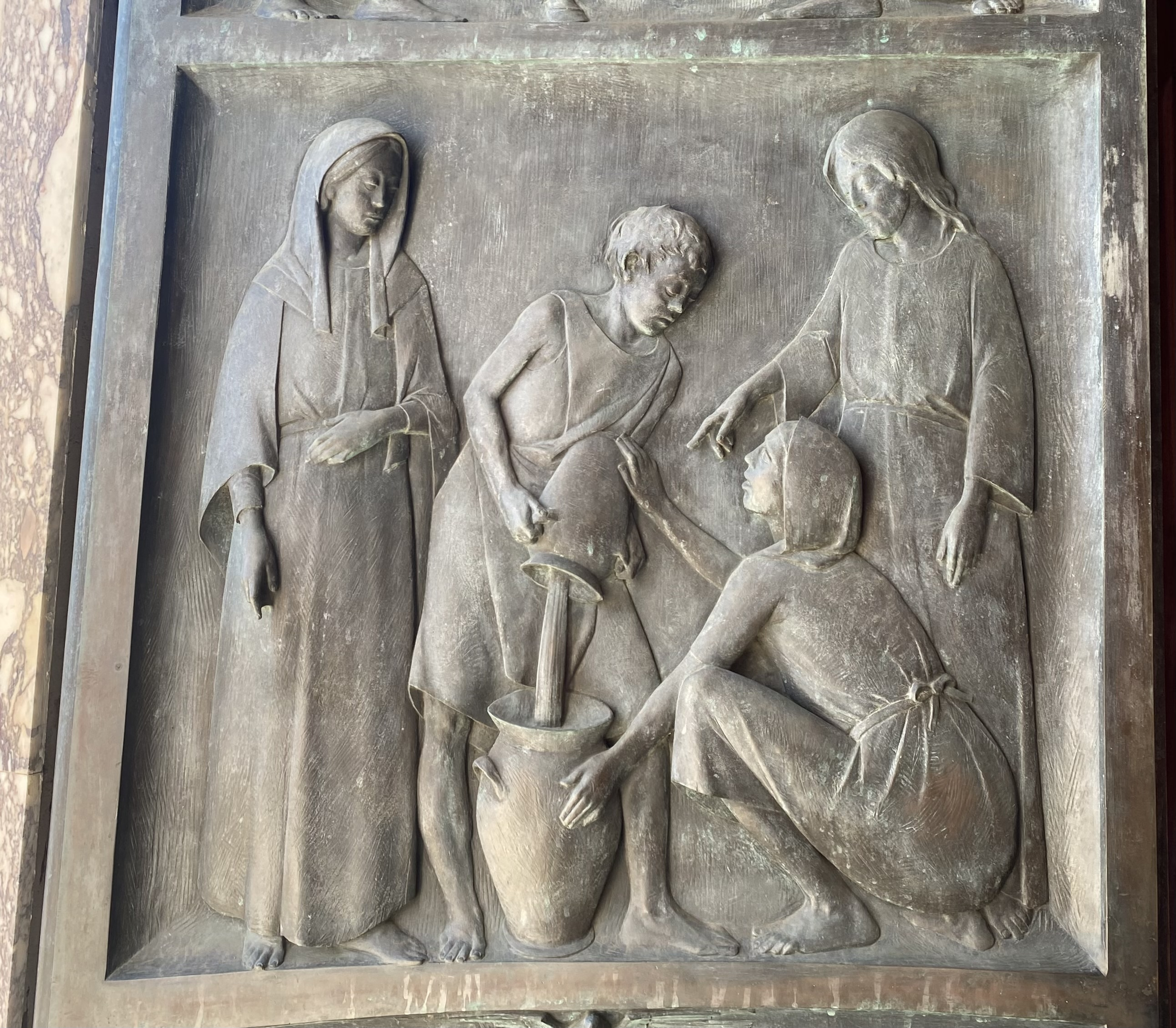
The Wedding at Cana panel at the Church of Saint Mary of Portosalvo, Siderno

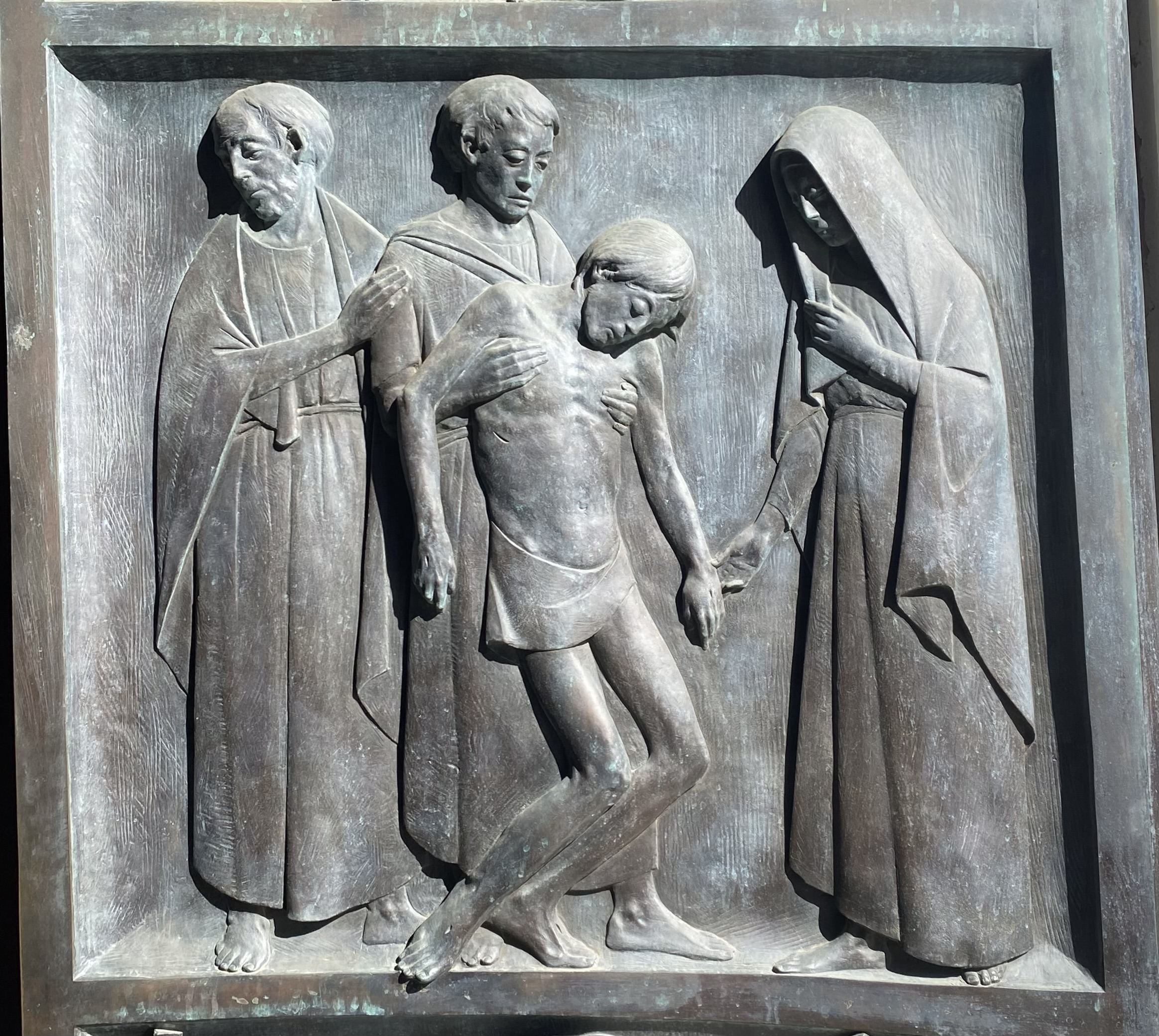
The Deposition from the Cross panel at the Church of Saint Mary of Portosalvo, Siderno

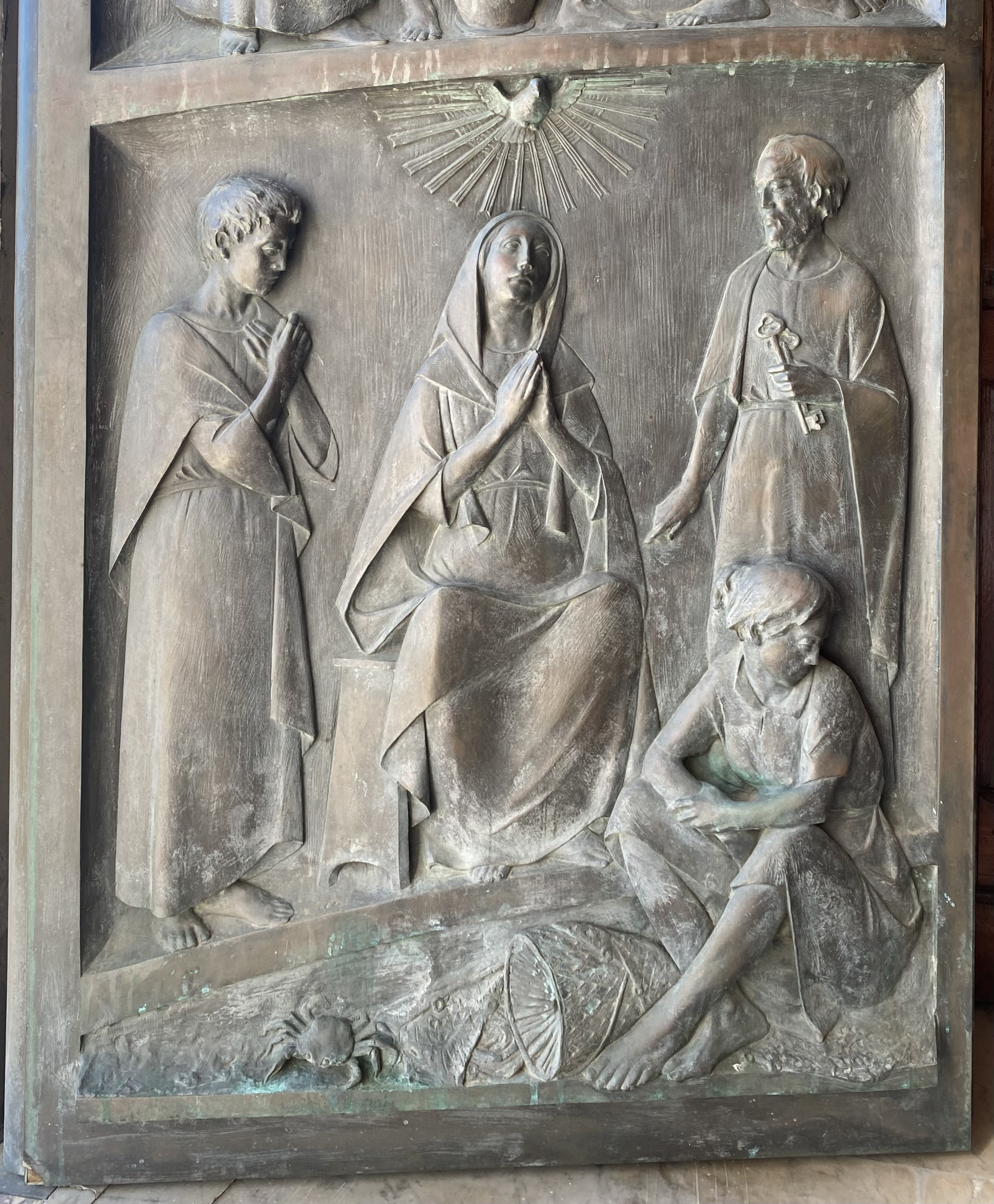
The Pentecost panel at the Church of Saint Mary of Portosalvo, Siderno

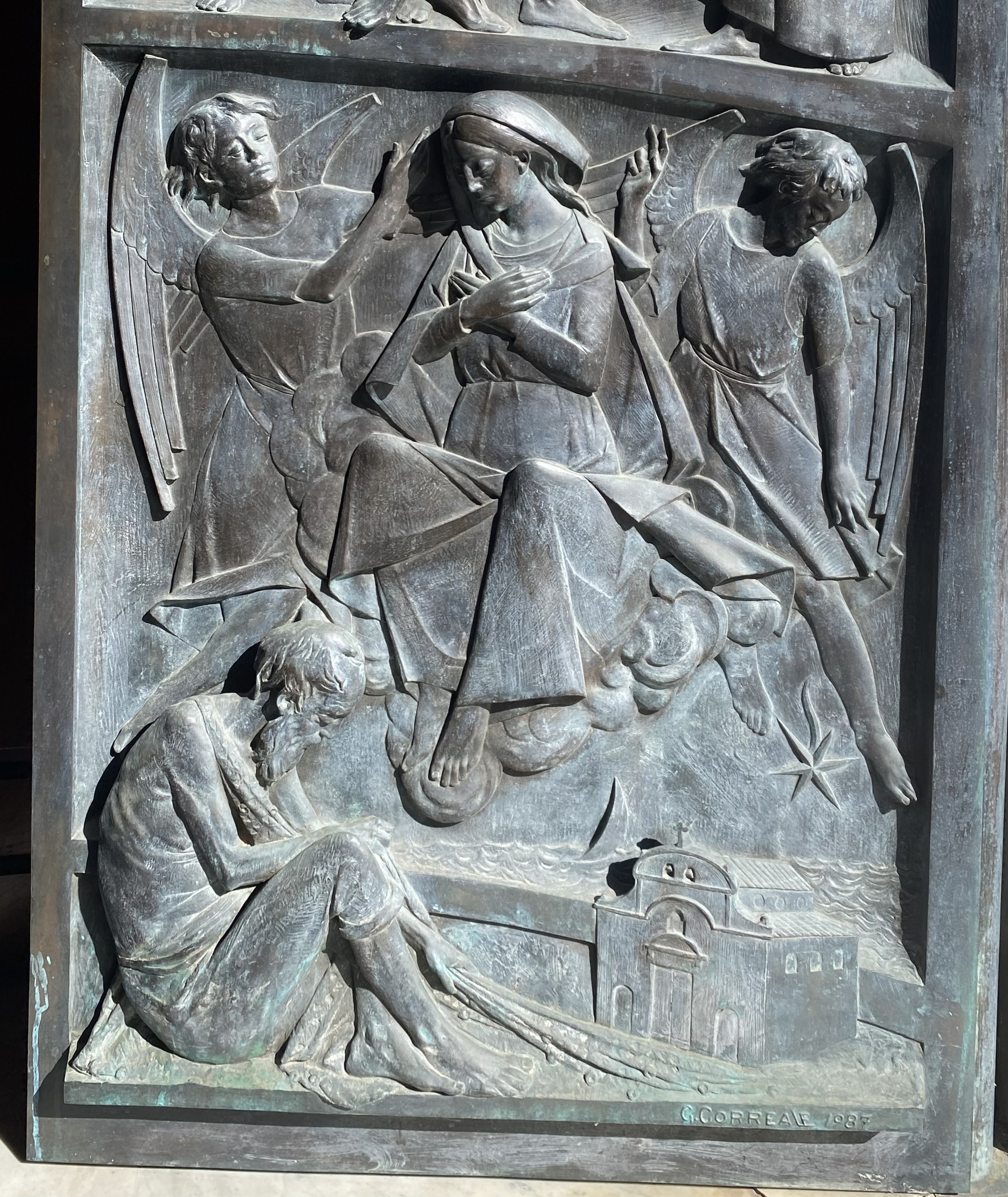
The Assumption of Mary panel at the Church of Saint Mary of Portosalvo, Siderno

=== Saint Mary of Portosalvo Celebrations ===
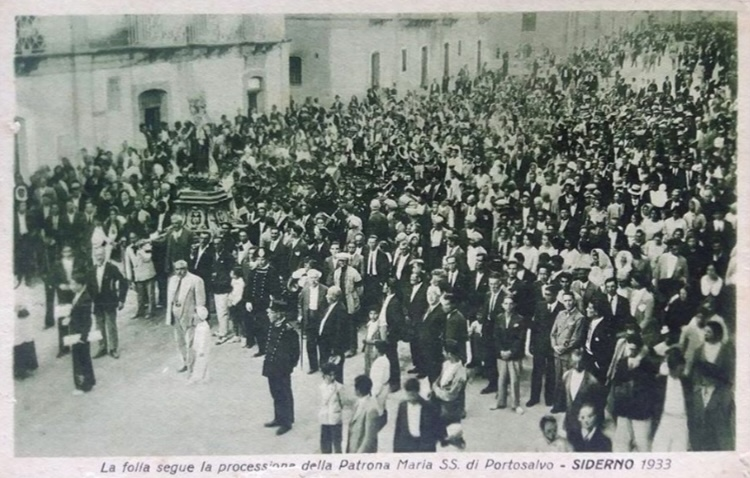
Siderno's Parade

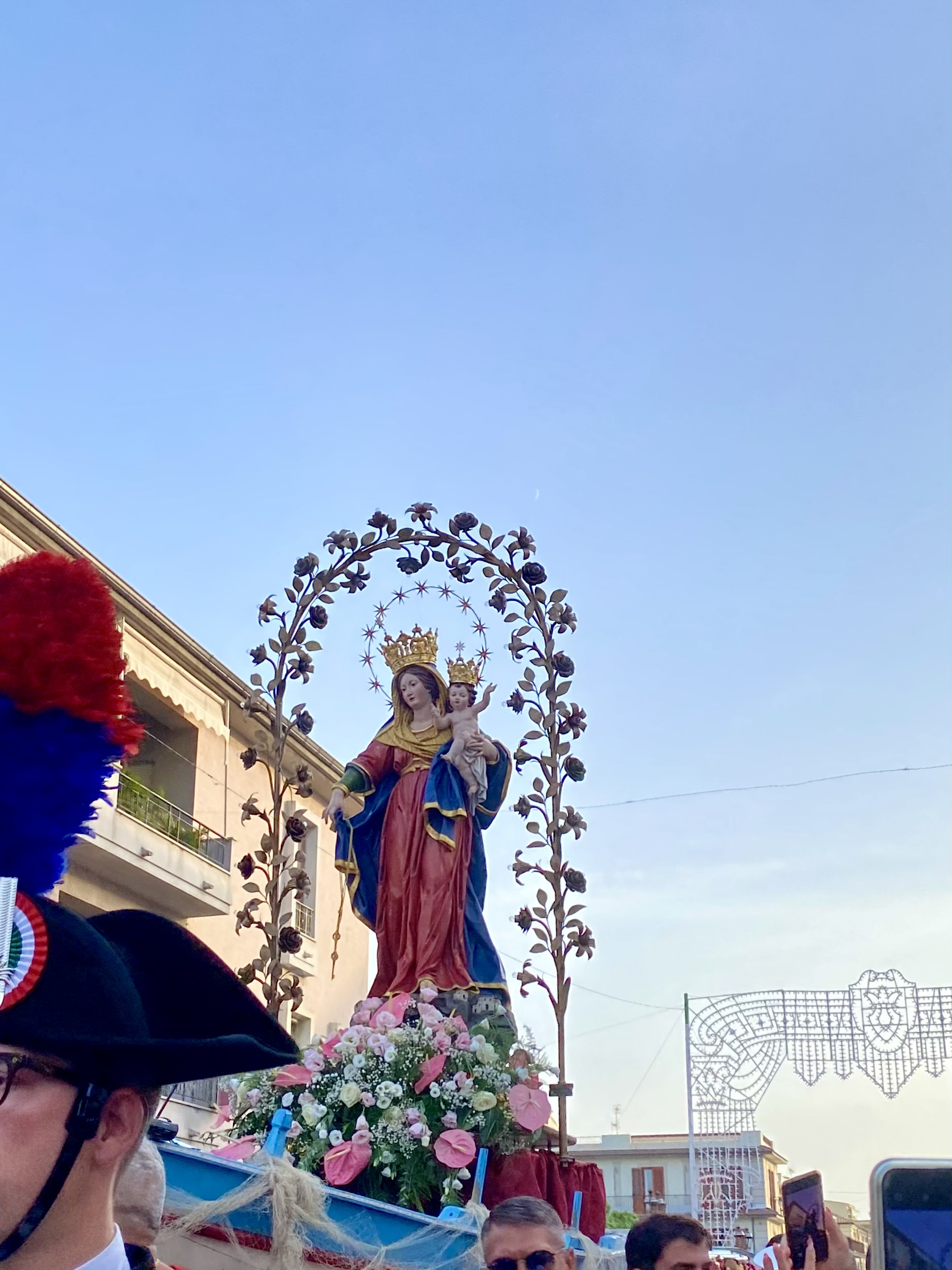
Statue of Saint Mary during the celebration through the city of Siderno

== See also ==
- Diocese of Locri-Gerace
- 17th-century Western domes
- Siderno
