= Descent from the Cross (disambiguation) =

The Descent from the Cross is the scene of taking Christ down from the cross after his crucifixion.

(The) Descent from the Cross may also refer to:

- The Descent from the Cross (Rembrandt, 1633)
- The Descent from the Cross (Rembrandt, 1634)
- The Descent from the Cross (Rembrandt, 1650–52)
- Descent from the Cross (Beckmann)
