= Constantijn à Renesse =

Dutch painter

Workshop of Rembrandt van Rijn: "The Descent from the Cross"

Constantijn à Renesse (1626 – 1680), was a Dutch Golden Age painter and pupil of Rembrandt.

== Biography ==
He was born in Maarssen to the son of Frederick Henry, Prince of Orange's military chaplain. He moved with his family to Breda and was sent to Leiden to the University, where besides literature studies he also took drawing lessons from Rembrandt in 1649. He moved to Eindhoven in 1653 where he later died. He is known for religious prints and drawings and is documented working with Rembrandt on paintings of religious subjects.
