= The Descent from the Cross (Rembrandt, 1634) =

1634 painting by Rembrandt

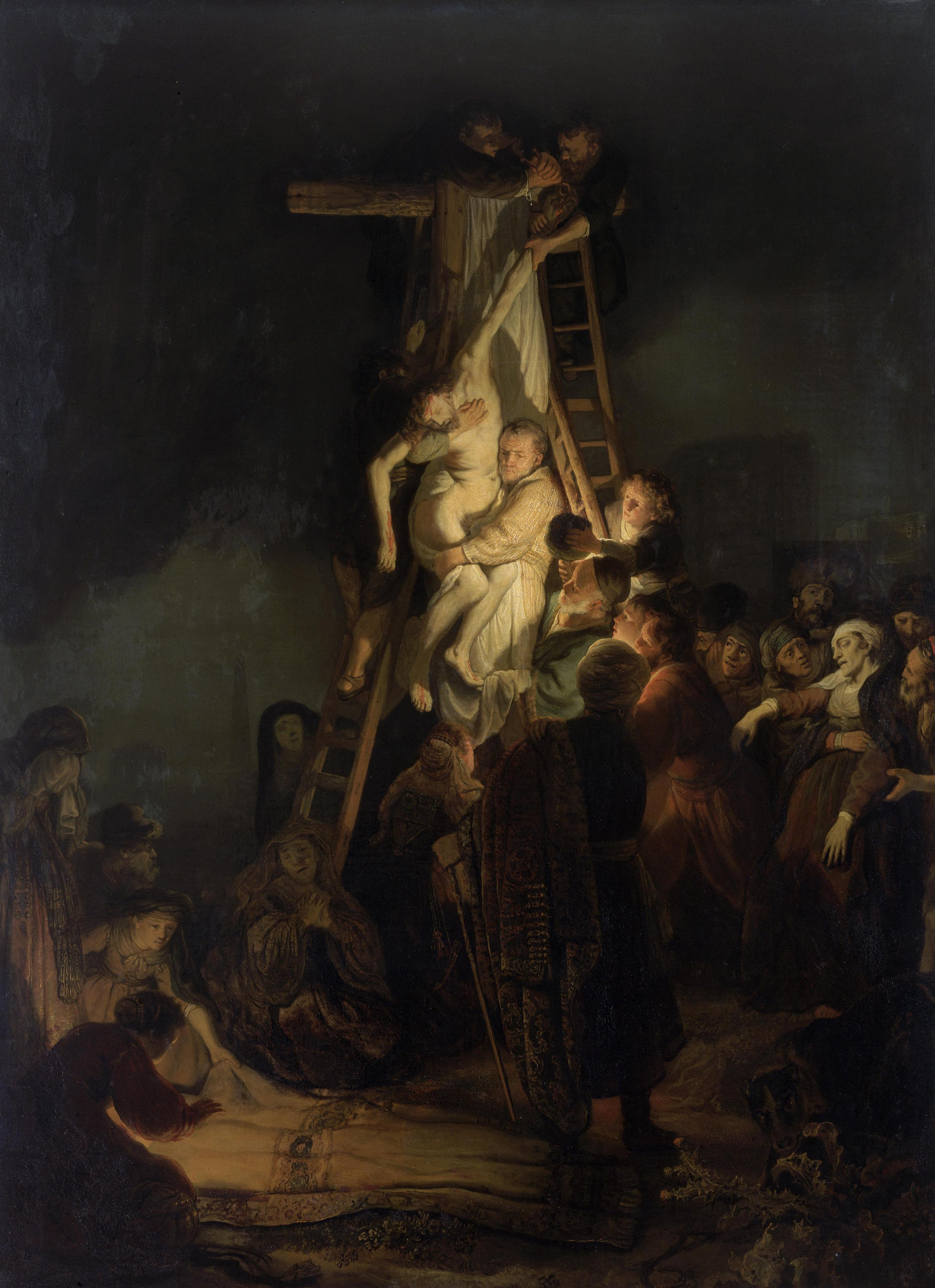
- Artist: Rembrandt
- Year: 1634
- Medium: oil on canvas
- Dimensions: 158 cm × 117 cm (62 in × 46 in)
- Location: Hermitage Museum, St. Petersburg

Descent from the Cross (1634) by Rembrandt is one of his many religious scenes. The piece is oil on canvas and now located in the Hermitage Museum in St. Petersburg. The piece is intriguing stylistically in its unique figural composition and variety of lighting effects. Aside from composition, the painting is notable in terms of its historical context, from the connection between its subject matter and Rembrandt's family situation to its endangered location during World War II.

== Description ==
The Descent from the Cross is a classic scene in religious themed art and, like many artists before and after him, Rembrandt portrayed this scene many times. In the Hermitage edition of the work, the figural arrangement is quite complex. While the scene is crowded, each person in the image has a specific facial expression, for the most part wracked with emotion. This emotion is shown in the weeping, open mourning of the women, and the more pensive, silently tense expressions of inner grief displayed by the men. Jesus' mother, Mary, is portrayed in the work as unconscious, having fainted from the overwhelming grief and sadness. She is portrayed as physically, and likely mentally, supported by the other bystanders. Jesus himself is portrayed in a realistic fashion, with his body slumped and twisted rather unsettlingly as he is carried down the cross displaying the lifeless quality of his form. Jesus' physical body shape is very rounded, almost Rubenesque, raising the question of whether Rembrandt was influenced by Rubens' notably voluptuous figures. Also evident on the body are the marks of the thorn crown and the stigmata on Jesus' hands and feet.

Lighting of this image is very elaborate and strategized upon certain figures creating groupings of bystanders. The intensity of the light is highly varied. The lightest and brightest areas are on Jesus' body, promoting it as the focal point of the piece, and the darkest area in the unlit, nearly black, inky background. Various torches and candles provide the light shed on the figures, as the scene takes place at night. The different types of candles and torches provide different intensities of light. Although varying in degree, light specifically illuminates, and delineates, three main groups. These groups are Jesus and the people carrying him, women laying out what appears to be a burial cloth, and Mary and her supporters. This strategic lighting seems to create a sort of order to the work, shedding light on what has happened, what will happen next, and the effect it has on others.

Rembrandt often used religious scenes and imagery in his paintings. Rembrandt's family was quite wealthy, his father was a miller, and his mother a baker's daughter. Although he later created many biblical works, Rembrandt was not raised in the church. His mother was a Roman Catholic, and father belonged to the Dutch Reformed Church. However, there is no evidence that Rembrandt belonged to a church. Throughout Rembrandt's youth and the early years of his career, the Netherlands was undergoing huge changes in religion in the form of the third wave of the Protestant Reformation. The third wave of the Reformation was followed closely by a large campaign by the Roman Catholic Jesuits to try to rekindle faith among Catholics. Dwindling numbers of Catholics and an influx of Protestant immigrants bringing about the end of the Roman Catholic era and the rise of Orthodox Calvinism that remains in the Netherlands to this day. Rembrandt's choice of this particular scene of biblical reference is part of both the Roman Catholic and the Protestant's belief systems.

In more modern times, during World War II, the Hermitage Museum where Rembrandt's Descent from the Cross is housed faced the dilemma of what to do with the possibility of a siege of Leningrad. The museum's treasures, including Descent from the Cross, were evacuated from their displays. Paintings were taken out of their frames and packed into crates, with works that were too large or too fragile to be packed moved to the museum's vaults and cellars, which were reinforced against impending bombs. After the siege, the Hermitage was repaired and restocked with masterpieces, reopening in 1945.

== See also ==
- The Descent from the Cross (Rembrandt, 1650–1652)
- List of paintings by Rembrandt
