= The Descent from the Cross (Rembrandt, 1650–1652) =

Painting by an unknown painter in the workshop of Rembrandt

- Artist: Rembrandt, Constantijn van Renesse
- Year: 1650–1652
- Medium: Oil on canvas
- Dimensions: 142 cm × 110.9 cm (56 in × 43.7 in)
- Location: National Gallery of Art; Washington, D.C.

The Descent from the Cross is a 1650–1652 painting of the Descent from the Cross by an unknown painter in the workshop of Rembrandt. It is an oil painting on canvas and is now in the National Gallery of Art in Washington.

Rembrandt's student Constantijn van Renesse has been proposed as the painter. The picture's composition would have been conceived by Rembrandt, who may have drawn it onto the canvas for van Renesse to complete, as the finished work does not show Rembrandt's touch.

== See also ==
- The Descent from the Cross (Rembrandt, 1634)
- List of paintings by Rembrandt
