= List of municipalities of the Metropolitan City of Reggio Calabria =

The following is a list of the 97 municipalities (comuni) of the Metropolitan City of Reggio Calabria in the region of Calabria in Italy.

== List ==
Municipality	Population (2026)	Area (km²)	Density
Africo	2,670	53.90	49.5
Agnana Calabra	446	8.49	52.5
Anoia	1,995	10.17	196.2
Antonimina	1,152	22.91	50.3
Ardore	4,906	32.78	149.7
Bagaladi	916	30.02	30.5
Bagnara Calabra	9,102	24.85	366.3
Benestare	2,489	18.72	133.0
Bianco	4,298	29.99	143.3
Bivongi	1,131	25.35	44.6
Bova	460	46.94	9.8
Bova Marina	3,925	29.50	133.1
Bovalino	8,743	18.06	484.1
Brancaleone	3,124	36.14	86.4
Bruzzano Zeffirio	1,010	20.74	48.7
Calanna	735	10.97	67.0
Camini	793	17.41	45.5
Campo Calabro	4,512	8.01	563.3
Candidoni	407	26.95	15.1
Canolo	684	28.30	24.2
Caraffa del Bianco	429	11.46	37.4
Cardeto	1,237	37.27	33.2
Careri	2,049	38.16	53.7
Casignana	680	24.54	27.7
Caulonia	6,649	101.76	65.3
Ciminà	510	49.24	10.4
Cinquefrondi	6,235	29.95	208.2
Cittanova	9,580	61.98	154.6
Condofuri	4,491	60.30	74.5
Cosoleto	728	34.37	21.2
Delianuova	3,052	21.38	142.8
Feroleto della Chiesa	1,489	7.56	197.0
Ferruzzano	685	19.11	35.8
Fiumara	789	6.59	119.7
Galatro	1,391	51.34	27.1
Gerace	2,275	28.99	78.5
Giffone	1,553	14.72	105.5
Gioia Tauro	19,324	39.87	484.7
Gioiosa Ionica	6,834	36.07	189.5
Grotteria	2,815	37.98	74.1
Laganadi	321	8.19	39.2
Laureana di Borrello	4,557	35.69	127.7
Locri	11,856	25.75	460.4
Mammola	2,335	81.07	28.8
Marina di Gioiosa Ionica	6,303	16.16	390.0
Maropati	1,291	10.52	122.7
Martone	476	8.34	57.1
Melicuccà	780	17.40	44.8
Melicucco	4,842	6.53	741.5
Melito di Porto Salvo	10,314	35.41	291.3
Molochio	2,122	37.45	56.7
Monasterace	3,234	15.73	205.6
Montebello Ionico	5,451	56.45	96.6
Motta San Giovanni	5,377	46.48	115.7
Oppido Mamertina	4,674	58.88	79.4
Palizzi	1,826	52.62	34.7
Palmi	17,983	32.12	559.9
Pazzano	497	15.57	31.9
Placanica	977	29.51	33.1
Platì	3,646	50.87	71.7
Polistena	9,822	11.77	834.5
Portigliola	994	6.00	165.7
Reggio di Calabria	167,925	239.04	702.5
Riace	1,796	16.24	110.6
Rizziconi	7,603	40.22	189.0
Roccaforte del Greco	291	43.86	6.6
Roccella Ionica	6,119	37.82	161.8
Roghudi	897	46.92	19.1
Rosarno	14,528	39.56	367.2
Samo	679	50.22	13.5
San Ferdinando	4,469	14.20	314.7
San Giorgio Morgeto	2,945	35.40	83.2
San Giovanni di Gerace	394	13.57	29.0
San Lorenzo	2,068	64.52	32.1
San Luca	3,297	105.35	31.3
San Pietro di Caridà	923	48.08	19.2
San Procopio	469	11.36	41.3
San Roberto	1,479	34.64	42.7
Sant'Agata del Bianco	524	20.20	25.9
Sant'Alessio in Aspromonte	299	3.99	74.9
Sant'Eufemia d'Aspromonte	3,625	32.88	110.2
Sant'Ilario dello Ionio	1,308	14.00	93.4
Santa Cristina d'Aspromonte	707	23.41	30.2
Santo Stefano in Aspromonte	1,001	17.80	56.2
Scido	797	17.53	45.5
Scilla	4,405	44.13	99.8
Seminara	2,473	33.85	73.1
Serrata	788	22.06	35.7
Siderno	17,619	31.86	553.0
Sinopoli	1,798	25.22	71.3
Staiti	161	16.31	9.9
Stignano	1,143	17.77	64.3
Stilo	2,306	78.11	29.5
Taurianova	14,643	48.55	301.6
Terranova Sappo Minulio	402	9.12	44.1
Varapodio	2,062	29.12	70.8
Villa San Giovanni	12,676	12.17	1,041.6

== See also ==
- List of municipalities of Calabria
- List of municipalities of Italy
