= Giaffone =

Giaffone (Italian: [dʒafˈfoːne], Brazilian Portuguese: [ʒaˈfoni]) is an Italian surname, primarily associated with a family of Brazilian racing drivers. Notable people with the surname include:

- Affonso Giaffone (born 1968), Brazilian racing driver
- Felipe Giaffone (born 1975), Brazilian racing driver
- Nicolas Giaffone (born 2004), Brazilian racing driver

== See also ==
- Ciaffone
- Giffone
- Giffoni
