= San Giorgio Morgeto =

San Giorgio Morgeto Griko: Agios Giorgis
- Comune
- Comune di San Giorgio Morgeto
- Location within Italy Location within Calabria
- Coordinates: 38°23′N 16°6′E
- Country: Italy
- Region: Calabria
- Metropolitan city: Reggio Calabria (RC)

Area
  - Total: 35.1 km^{2} (13.6 sq mi)

Population (Dec. 2004)
  - Total: 3,356
  - Density: 95.6/km^{2} (248/sq mi)
- Demonym: Sangiorgesi
- Time zone: UTC+1 (CET)
  - Summer (DST): UTC+2 (CEST)
- Postal code: 89017
- Dialing code: 0966

San Giorgio Morgeto (Calabrian: San Giorgiu Morgetu or simply San Giorgi) is a comune (municipality) in the Province of Reggio Calabria in the Italian region Calabria, located about 70 kilometres (43 miles) southwest of Catanzaro and about 50 km (31 mi) northeast of Reggio Calabria. As of 31 December 2004, it had a population of 3,356 and an area of 35.1 square kilometres (13.6 sq mi).

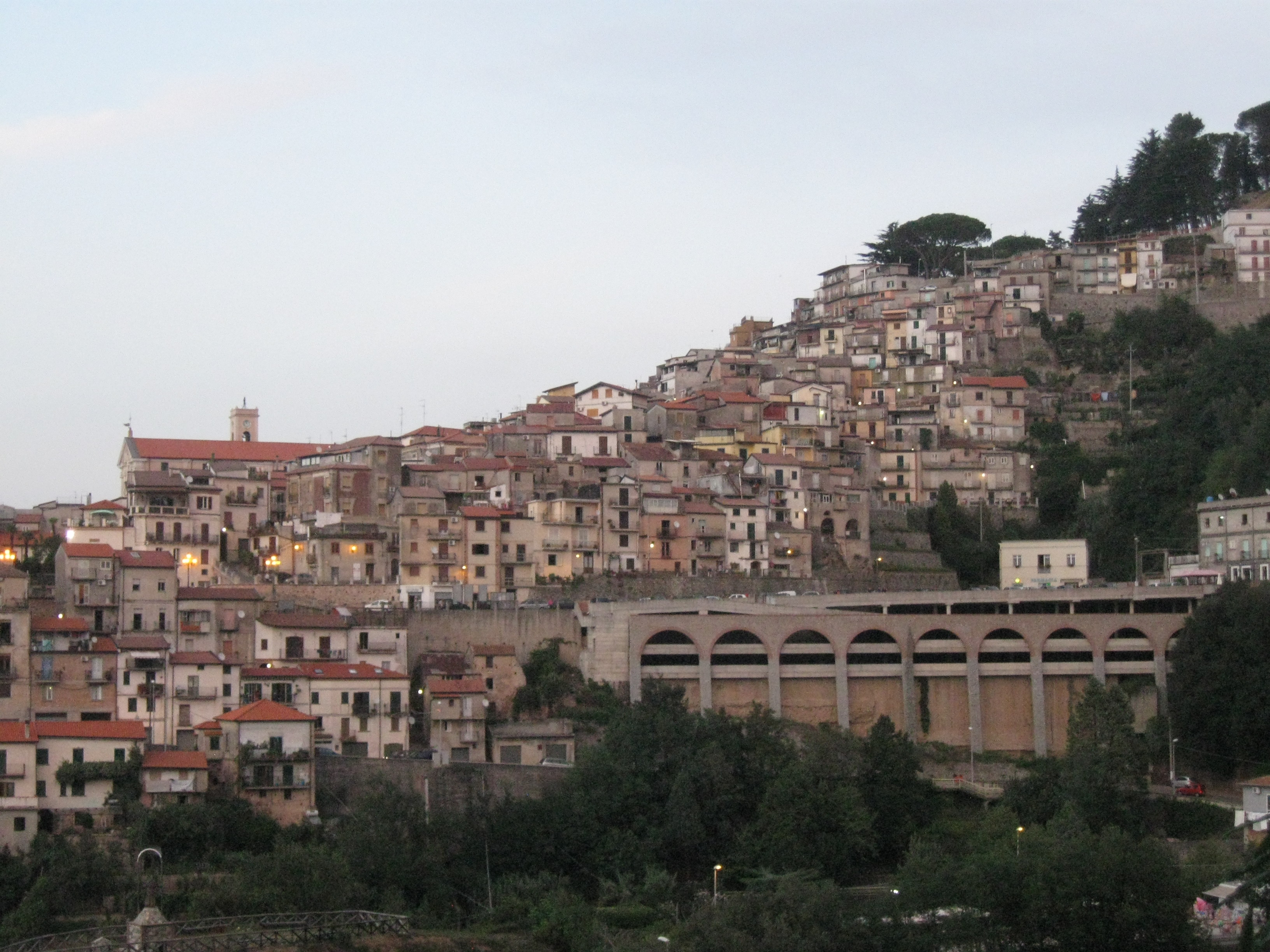
San Giorgio Morgeto

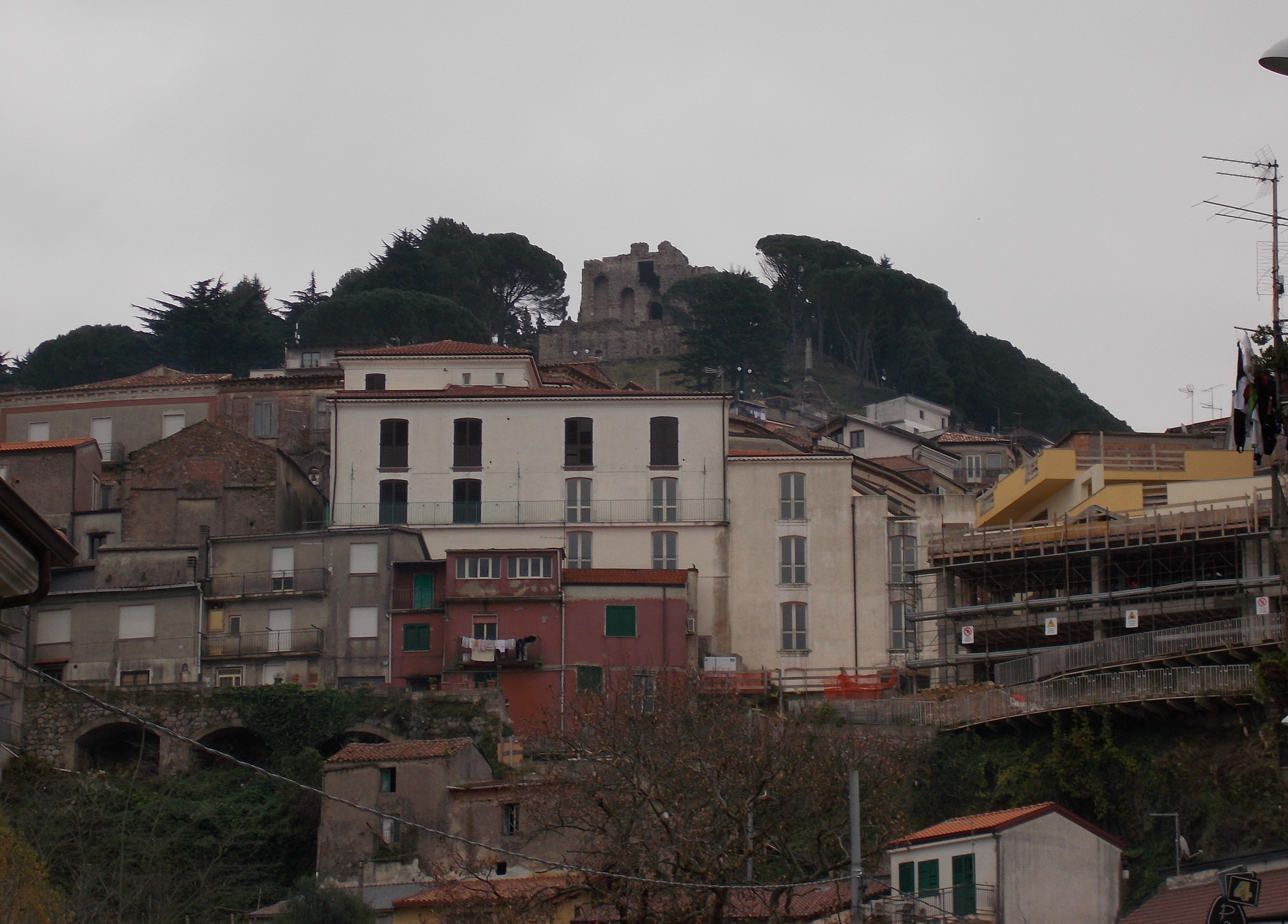
San Giorgio Morgeto, with the castle

San Giorgio Morgeto borders the following municipalities: Canolo, Cinquefrondi, Cittanova, Mammola, Polistena.

== History ==
The history of San Giorgio Morgeto is the topic of many myths concerning King Italus and the Morgetes which centre on the citadel, located on a hill which falls within the Aspromonte National Park.

It is a very ancient citadel, which Morges son of Italus built, and after whom it is named Morgeto

— Girolamo Marafioti, Croniche, et antichita di Calabria pag.114, Padova, Ad instanza de gl'Uniti, 1601.

The area was certainly a point of great military and strategic significance and it may have previously served as an outpost of the Ancient Greek inhabitants of Locri to assure their control of their colonies on the Tyrrhenian coast: Medma, Hipponion and Metaurus. Archaeological work has revealed that a fortress was built nearby at Altanum by Justinian to defend the area against Gothic forces during the Gothic War.

In the 9th century AD, there were Byzantine monks on the site, who influenced the economic and religious activities of the community. They built a monastery and a church (Hodegetria), which became a central point for the people of the area. According to S.Nico, when there was a plague, Morgeto and its monastery did not suffer any harm and accepted refugees from Taureana di Palmi and Oppido Mamertina.

Subsequently, the area was conquered by the Normans, who built the castle on the site and whose feudatories remained in control of the area until the reign of the Hohenstaufens. In 1324, San Giorgio became a barony, containing Polistena, Anoia, Cinquefrondi, Prateria and Galatro. In 1343, this barony was given to Antonio Caracciolo by Queen Joanna I. Subsequently, the barony endured under the suzereinity of the Angevins, the Hohenstaufens, and the Aragonese.

In 1684, the borders of the barony extended east as far as Prateria and south to San Fili. The barony passed from the Caracciolo to the Correale and then to the Milano family (Barons of San Giorgio from 1501 and Marquesses from 1593), who retained the title until 1806, when Napoleon abolished feudalism.

In 1864, Victor Emmanuel II changed the name of San Giorgio to San Giorgio Morgeto. Previously it had sometimes been known as San Giorgio di Polistena, because it was part of the Polistena region.

== Architecture ==
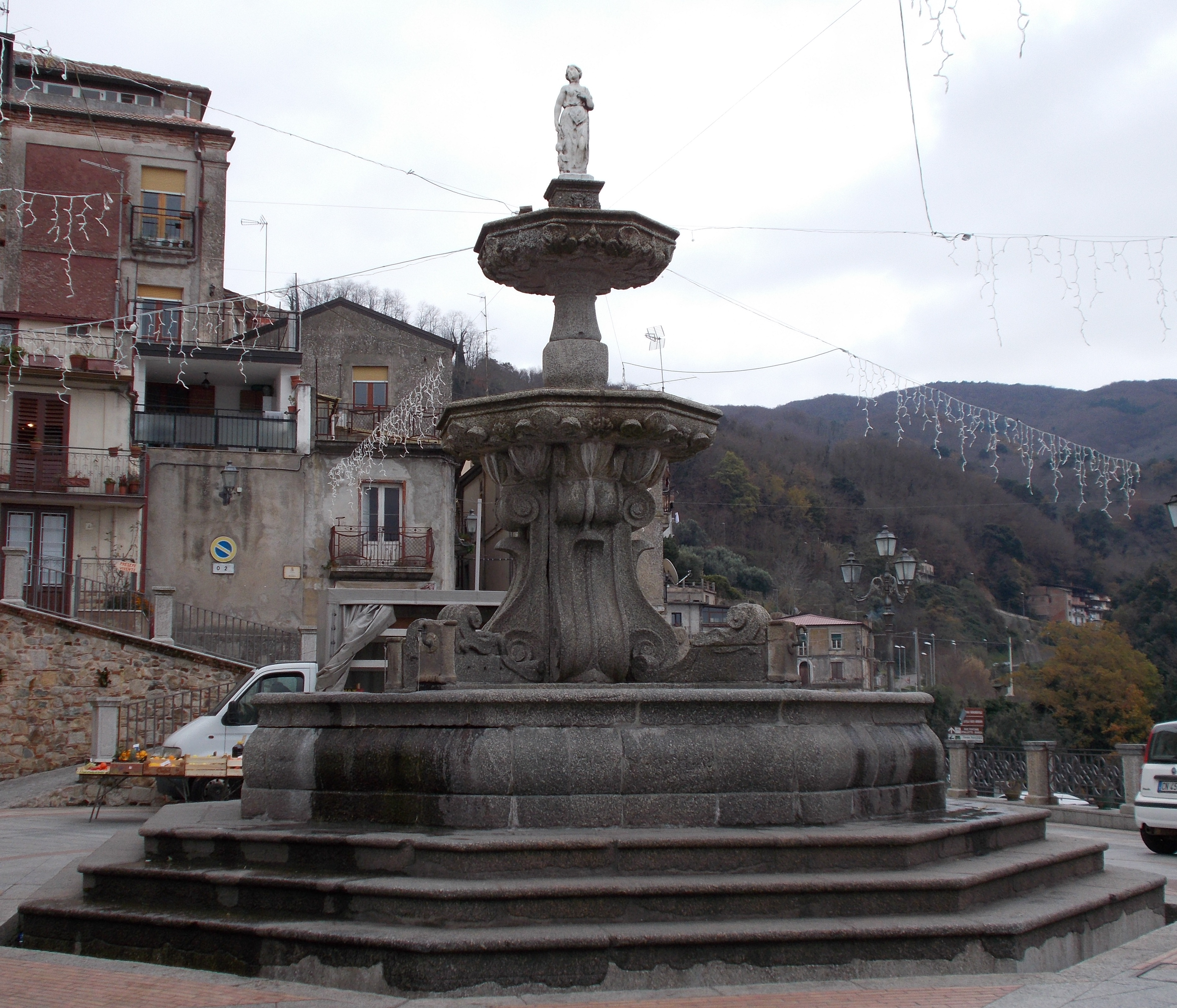
Fontana Grande, symbol of the town of San Giorgio Morgeto

=== Religious structures ===
The Convent of San Domenico, of Byzantine origin, was granted to Baron Caracciolo in 1393 by Pope Boniface IX, where he erected a church dedicated to the Annunciation. Tommaso Campanella undertook his early education and said his vows at the age of fourteen at the convent. In 1818, the convent of San Giorgio was renovated, along with the other six Dominican convents of Calabria.

The Mother church dell'Assunta is the religious centre of San Giorgio Morgeto. It contains wooden statues of the Neapolitan school depicting Saint George and Saint James as companions, a crucifix, and a polychrome marble main altar from the eighteenth century, as well as a nineteenth century Neapolitan organ. The ancient "Pietra Santa" (Holy rock) is visible in the external wall of the church having been revealed during restoration work on the church. It was probably an object of veneration for the worshipers, as the corrosion to it (probably resulting from believers kissing it) indicates. There is also a carving of a cross visible on it.

The Tommaso Campanella Comunale Library is the centre of San Giorgio Morgeto's cultural life and is located in the historic centre of the town on two floors. Originally it was for ecclesiastical use; it is now used for conferences and meetings. The library is named for Tommaso Campanella, the Dominican theologian who began his monastic life at the Convent of San Giorgio Morgeto.

=== The Castle ===
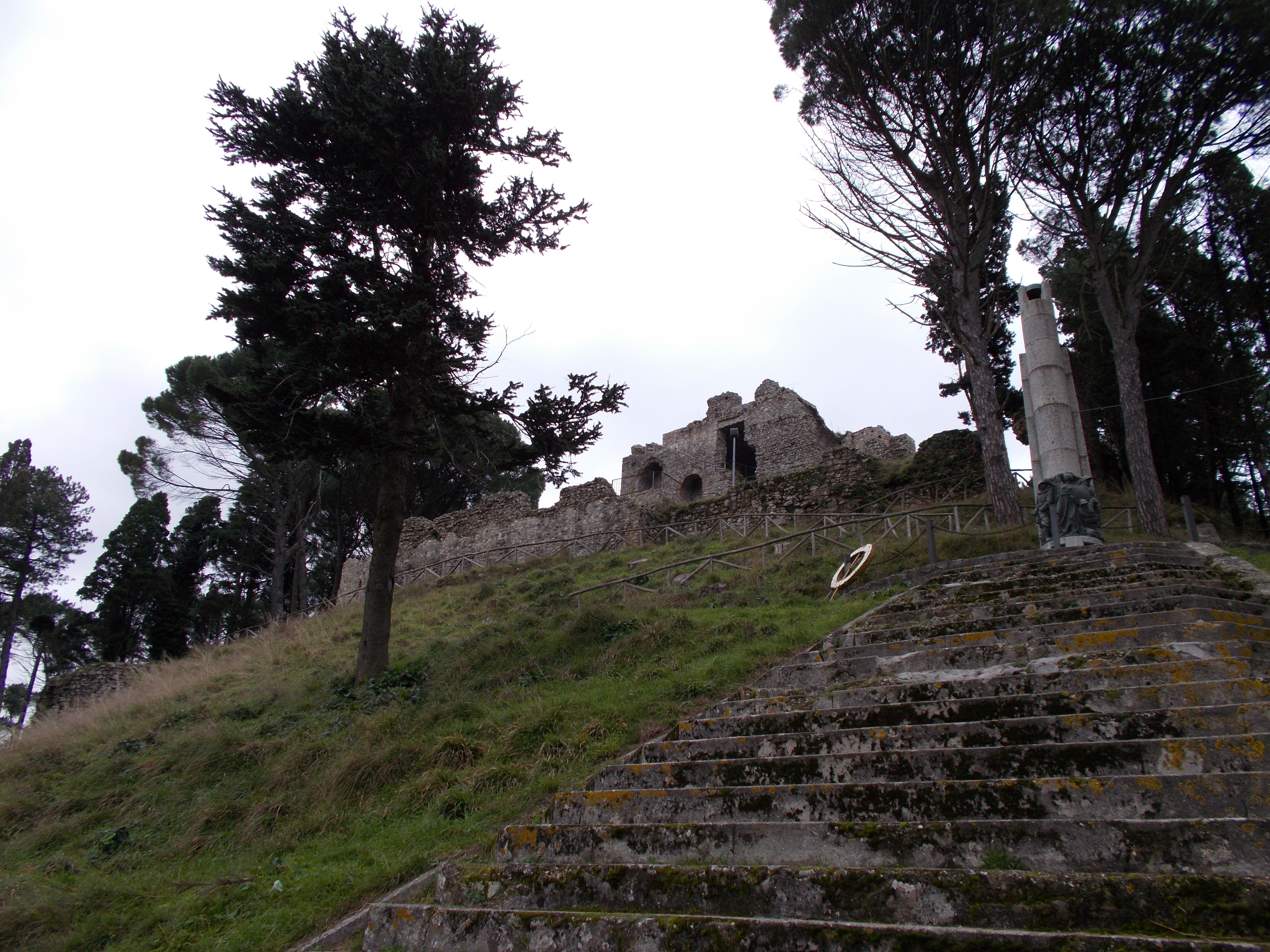
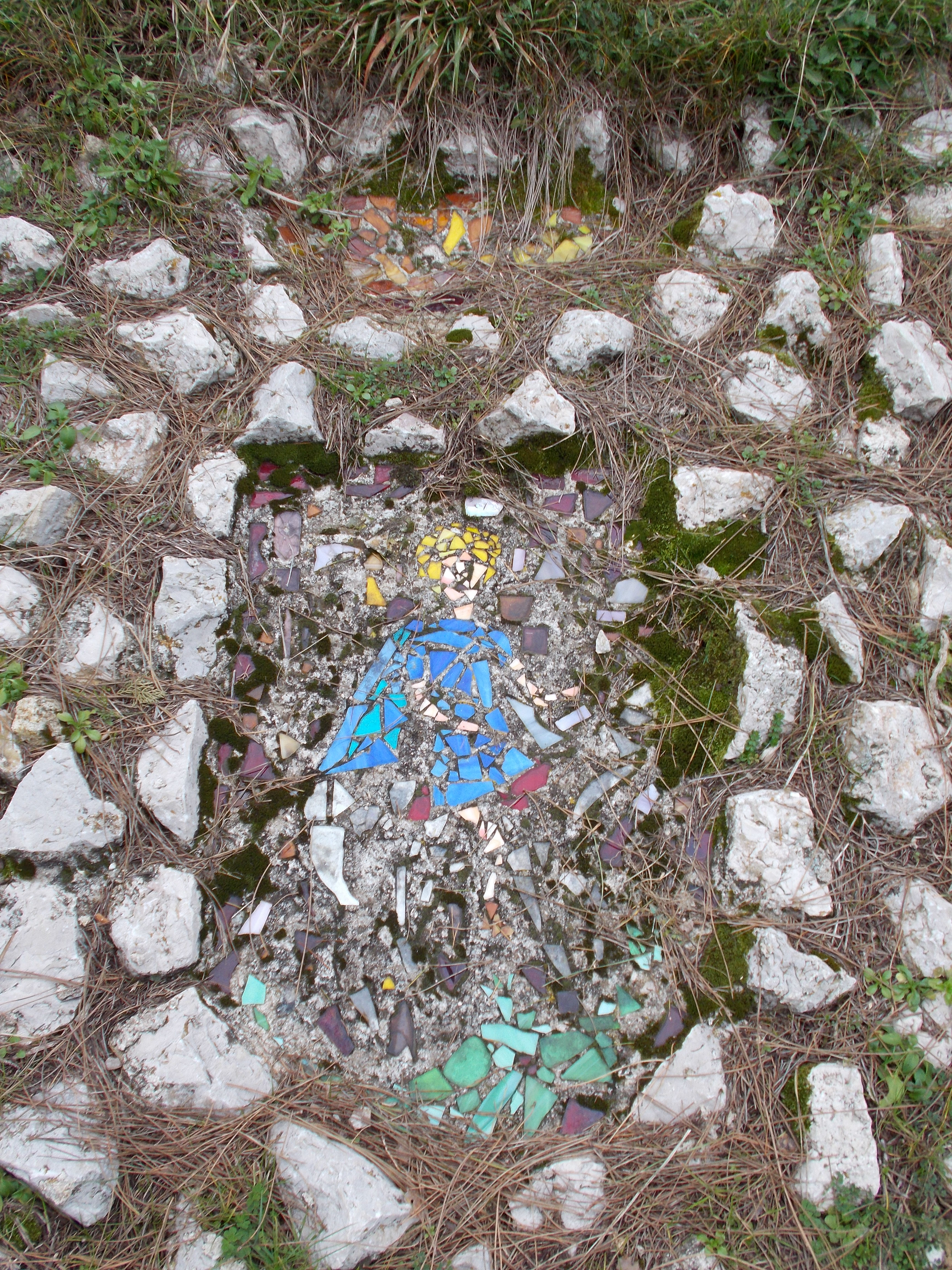
The castle with the monument to the fallen (left); the mosaic of the castle (right).

The Castle of San Giorgio Morgeto was built in the 9th or 10th century AD on the summit of a rocky peak near the settlement. It is one of the few examples of High Medieval Calabrian architecture and one of the few fortifications in the region to have undergone restoration work. Even today it dominates the plain of Gioia Tauro from the Tyrrhenian Sea to Capo Vaticano, with a view of Stromboli and the Aeolian Islands. Local legend attributes the original fortification to the mythical King Morges of the Morgetes, son of Italus. Morges' shade or ghost is meant to appear on the walls from time to time.

Rebuilt and expanded by the Normans in the eleventh century, during the reign of Roger I, it underwent various changes over the centuries, mostly in response to changing military requirements, at the hands of the Caracciolo, Curreale di Sorrento, and Milano families. It was finally abandoned in the sixteenth century.

The surviving structure consists of the walls, the foundations of the towers and the cistern, which is now used as a gallery and conference hall. The field below the castle is used for concerts and cultural events. The keep is difficult to access, but the cistern and the lower part of the castle can be reached easily by means of a stairway from the monument to the fallen. The ruins of the keep have been the object of restoration work, while the wider area requires further work. In February 2010, artistic nocturnal lighting was installed.

=== War memorials ===
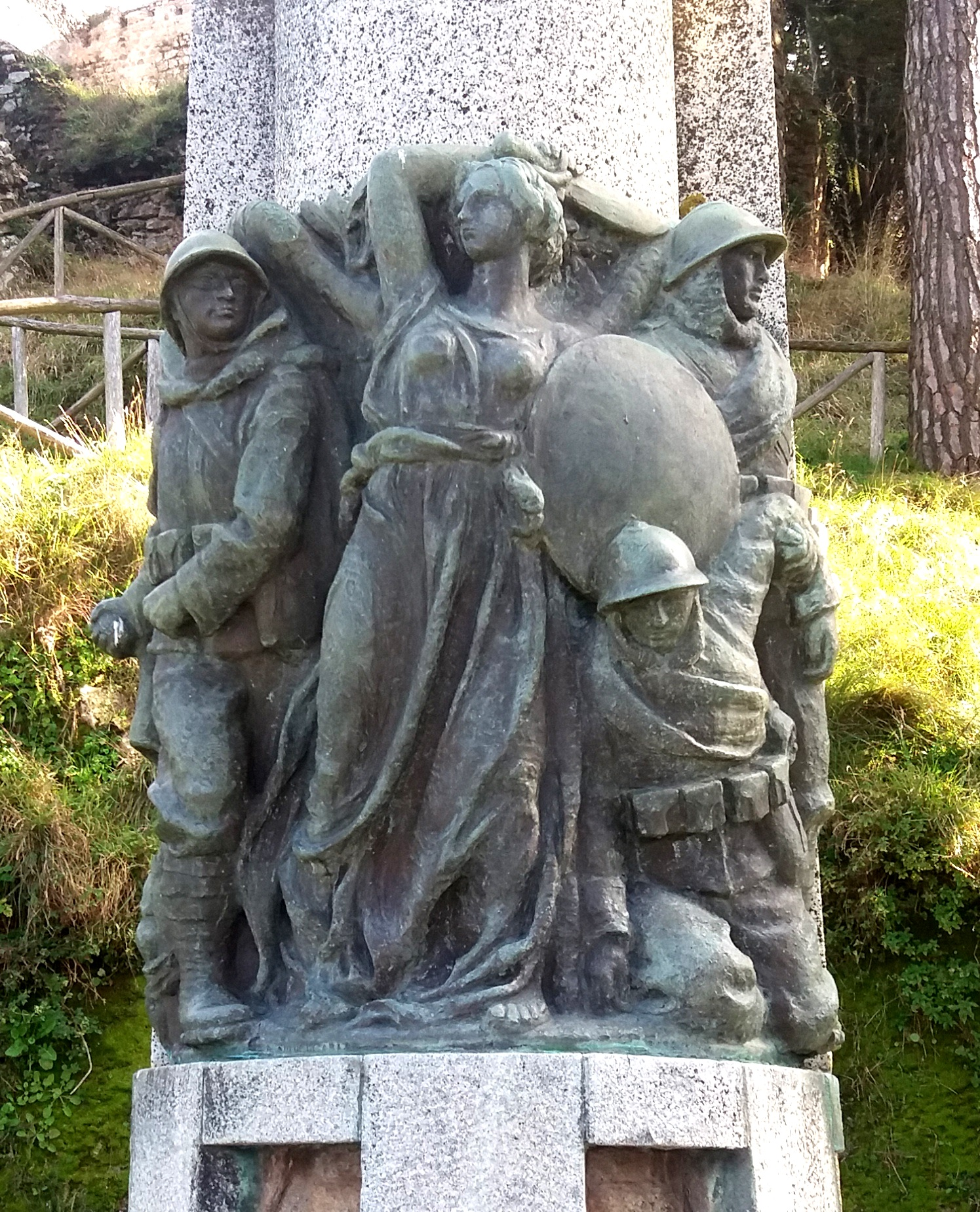
Fortunato Longo Monument

In the 1920s, the comune of San Giorgio Morgeto commissioned Fortunato Longo (a sculptor with strong links to the town) to create a memorial for the soldiers killed in the First World War. The resulting monument still stands near the castle. It is a bronze sculptured group, with a winged female warrior in the centre holding sword and shield, symbolising attack and defence. There are three Italian soldiers at her sides. The soldier at her right is in the process of throwing a grenade of the type employed by the Italian army in 1915, the SIPE (Società Italiana Prodotti Esplondenti). The man at her left carries a wounded soldier out of battle.

In September 1943, a German pilot was shot down by an Allied pilot over San Giorgio. His body was found in a field nearby with no means of identification. The comune erected a monument for this unknown airman on a hill in the comunale cemetery.

=== Archaeological site ===
In 1921, Paolo Orsi assigned Vincenzo De Cristo to perform excavations at Altanum, near San Giorgio. The large walls, remains of a circular tower (called the "Bombardiera") were identified by Minuto as the remains of a sixth-century Byzantine fortress from the reign of Justinian, part of the defensive network built after the Goths invaded Calabria during the Gothic War. During the excavations near the cistern, a large amount of ceramic material and bone fragments were found.

== Demographic evolution ==
Historical population

Year	Pop.	±%
1861	4,806	—
1871	5,375	+11.8%
1881	5,180	−3.6%
1901	4,645	−10.3%
1911	5,368	+15.6%

Year	Pop.	±%
1921	6,063	+12.9%
1931	6,536	+7.8%
1936	5,908	−9.6%
1951	6,181	+4.6%
1961	5,451	−11.8%

Year	Pop.	±%
1971	4,570	−16.2%
1981	4,046	−11.5%
1991	3,764	−7.0%
2001	3,384	−10.1%

Source: Data from ISTAT

== Notable people ==
- Francesco Florimo (1800-1888), musician, composer and librarian
- Fortunato Longo (sculptor).
- Francesco Macri (1931-2019), Italian-Argentine businessman
- Tommaso Campanella (1568-1639), Dominican theologian

== International relations ==
=== Twin towns — Sister cities ===
San Giorgio Morgeto is twinned with:

- Aosta, Italy
- San Luca, Italy
