= Ardore =

Ardore Greek: Ardor
- Comune
- Comune di Ardore
- Location within Italy Location within Calabria
- Coordinates: 38°11′N 16°10′E
- Country: Italy
- Region: Calabria
- Metropolitan city: Reggio Calabria (RC)

Area
  - Total: 32.7 km^{2} (12.6 sq mi)

Population (Dec. 2004)
  - Total: 4,822
  - Density: 147/km^{2} (382/sq mi)
- Time zone: UTC+1 (CET)
  - Summer (DST): UTC+2 (CEST)
- Postal code: 89031
- Dialing code: 0964

Ardore (Calabrian: Ardùri; Ancient Greek: Άρδωρ, romanized: Ardor) is a comune (municipality) in the Province of Reggio Calabria in the Italian region Calabria, located about 90 kilometres (56 mi) southwest of Catanzaro and about 45 kilometres (28 mi) east of Reggio Calabria. As of 31 December 2004, it had a population of 4,822 and an area of 32.7 square kilometres (12.6 mi^{2}).

Ardore borders the following municipalities: Benestare, Bovalino, Ciminà, Platì, Sant'Ilario dello Ionio.

== Demographic evolution ==
Historical population

Year	Pop.	±%
1861	4,850	—
1871	5,225	+7.7%
1881	5,824	+11.5%
1901	6,078	+4.4%
1911	6,788	+11.7%

Year	Pop.	±%
1921	7,941	+17.0%
1931	7,419	−6.6%
1936	7,593	+2.3%
1951	7,846	+3.3%
1961	6,482	−17.4%

Year	Pop.	±%
1971	5,200	−19.8%
1981	5,130	−1.3%
1991	5,037	−1.8%
2001	4,820	−4.3%

Source: Data from ISTAT

== External ==
Ardore Extractions-Hosts images of actual Vital Records of the residents of Ardore
