= Feroleto =

Feroleto may refer to a pair of Italian municipalities located in Calabria:

- Feroleto Antico, in the Province of Catanzaro
- Feroleto della Chiesa, in the Province of Reggio Calabria
