= Bovalino =

Bovalino Βοειδίν (Greek)
- Comune
- Comune di Bovalino
- Location within Italy Location within Calabria
- Coordinates: 38°9′N 16°10′E
- Country: Italy
- Region: Calabria
- Metropolitan city: Reggio Calabria (RC)
- Frazioni: Bosco S. Ippolito, Belloro, Russellina, Bricà, S. Nicola, Pozzo, Bovalino Superiore, Biviera, Rosa, Cipparello

Area
  - Total: 18.0 km^{2} (6.9 sq mi)

Population (Dec. 2004)
  - Total: 8,406
  - Density: 467/km^{2} (1,210/sq mi)
- Demonym: Bovalinesi
- Time zone: UTC+1 (CET)
  - Summer (DST): UTC+2 (CEST)
- Postal code: 89034
- Dialing code: 0964
- Website: Official website

Bovalino is a comune (municipality) in the Province of Reggio Calabria in the Italian region Calabria, located about 90 kilometres (56 mi) southwest of Catanzaro and about 46 kilometres (29 mi) east of Reggio Calabria. As of 31 December 2004, it had a population of 8,406 and an area of 18.0 square kilometres (6.9 mi^{2}).

The municipality of Bovalino contains the frazioni (subdivisions, mainly villages and hamlets) Bosco S. Ippolito (Greek: Aghios Ippolytos), Belloro, Russellina, Bricà, S. Nicola, Pozzo, Bovalino Superiore, Biviera, Rosa, and Cipparello.

Bovalino borders the following municipalities: Ardore, Benestare, Casignana, San Luca.

Bovalino was also the birthplace of the Blessed Camillus Costanzo.

== Demographic evolution ==
Historical population

Year	Pop.	±%
1861	2,152	—
1871	2,617	+21.6%
1881	3,666	+40.1%
1901	4,530	+23.6%
1911	5,250	+15.9%

Year	Pop.	±%
1921	5,364	+2.2%
1931	6,131	+14.3%
1936	6,469	+5.5%
1951	7,435	+14.9%
1961	6,929	−6.8%

Year	Pop.	±%
1971	6,463	−6.7%
1981	6,989	+8.1%
1991	8,307	+18.9%
2001	8,358	+0.6%

Source: Data from ISTAT
