= Careri =

Careri Hàreri (Greek)
- Comune
- Comune di Careri
- Location within Italy Location within Calabria
- Coordinates: 38°11′N 16°7′E
- Country: Italy
- Region: Calabria
- Metropolitan city: Reggio Calabria (RC)

Area
  - Total: 38.2 km^{2} (14.7 sq mi)

Population (Dec. 2004)
  - Total: 2,427
  - Density: 63.5/km^{2} (165/sq mi)
- Time zone: UTC+1 (CET)
  - Summer (DST): UTC+2 (CEST)
- Postal code: 89030
- Dialing code: 0964

Careri is a comune (municipality) in the Province of Reggio Calabria in the Italian region Calabria, located about 90 kilometres (56 mi) southwest of Catanzaro and about 40 kilometres (25 mi) east of Reggio Calabria. As of 31 December 2004, it had a population of 2,427 and an area of 38.2 square kilometres (14.7 mi^{2}). Careri borders the following municipalities: Benestare, Platì, San Luca, Santa Cristina d'Aspromonte.

== Demographic evolution ==
Historical population

Year	Pop.	±%
1861	954	—
1871	1,061	+11.2%
1881	1,259	+18.7%
1901	1,591	+26.4%
1911	1,848	+16.2%

Year	Pop.	±%
1921	1,987	+7.5%
1931	2,374	+19.5%
1936	2,565	+8.0%
1951	2,953	+15.1%
1961	2,965	+0.4%

Year	Pop.	±%
1971	2,679	−9.6%
1981	2,470	−7.8%
1991	2,536	+2.7%
2001	2,443	−3.7%

Source: Data from ISTAT
