= Rizziconi =

Rizziconi Rizzìcuni (Sicilian)
- Comune
- Comune di Rizziconi
- Location within Italy Location within Calabria
- Coordinates: 38°25′N 15°58′E
- Country: Italy
- Region: Calabria
- Metropolitan city: Reggio Calabria (RC)
- Frazioni: Drosi, Cirello, Spina, Russo

Area
  - Total: 39.7 km^{2} (15.3 sq mi)
- Elevation: 87 m (285 ft)

Population (Dec. 2004)
  - Total: 7,926
  - Density: 200/km^{2} (517/sq mi)
- Demonym: Rizziconesi
- Time zone: UTC+1 (CET)
  - Summer (DST): UTC+2 (CEST)
- Postal code: 89016
- Dialing code: 0966
- Website: Official website

Rizziconi (Italian: [ritˈtsiːkoni], also hypercorrected as [ridˈdziːkoni]; Calabrian: Rizzìcuni [ʐɪtˈtsiːkʊnɪ]) is a comune (municipality) in the Province of Reggio Calabria in the Italian region Calabria, located about 80 kilometres (50 mi) southwest of Catanzaro and about 45 kilometres (28 mi) northeast of Reggio Calabria. As of 31 December 2004, it had a population of 7,926 and an area of 39.7 square kilometres (15.3 mi^{2}).

The municipality of Rizziconi contains the frazioni (subdivisions, mainly villages and hamlets) Drosi, Cirello, Spina, and Russo.

Rizziconi borders the following municipalities: Cittanova, Gioia Tauro, Oppido Mamertina, Rosarno, Seminara, Taurianova.

== Mafia infiltration of city council ==
The city council of Rizziconi was dissolved in 2001 because of influence by the 'Ndrangheta. The town is home to the 'ndrina of Teodoro Crea.

== Demographic evolution ==
Historical population

Year	Pop.	±%
1861	1,833	—
1871	2,294	+25.2%
1881	2,484	+8.3%
1901	3,814	+53.5%
1911	4,523	+18.6%

Year	Pop.	±%
1921	5,020	+11.0%
1931	5,475	+9.1%
1936	5,902	+7.8%
1951	7,268	+23.1%
1961	6,767	−6.9%

Year	Pop.	±%
1971	6,887	+1.8%
1981	7,075	+2.7%
1991	7,479	+5.7%
2001	7,650	+2.3%

Source: Data from ISTAT
