= Placanica =

Placanica Griko: Lakonìka
- Comune
- Comune di Placanica
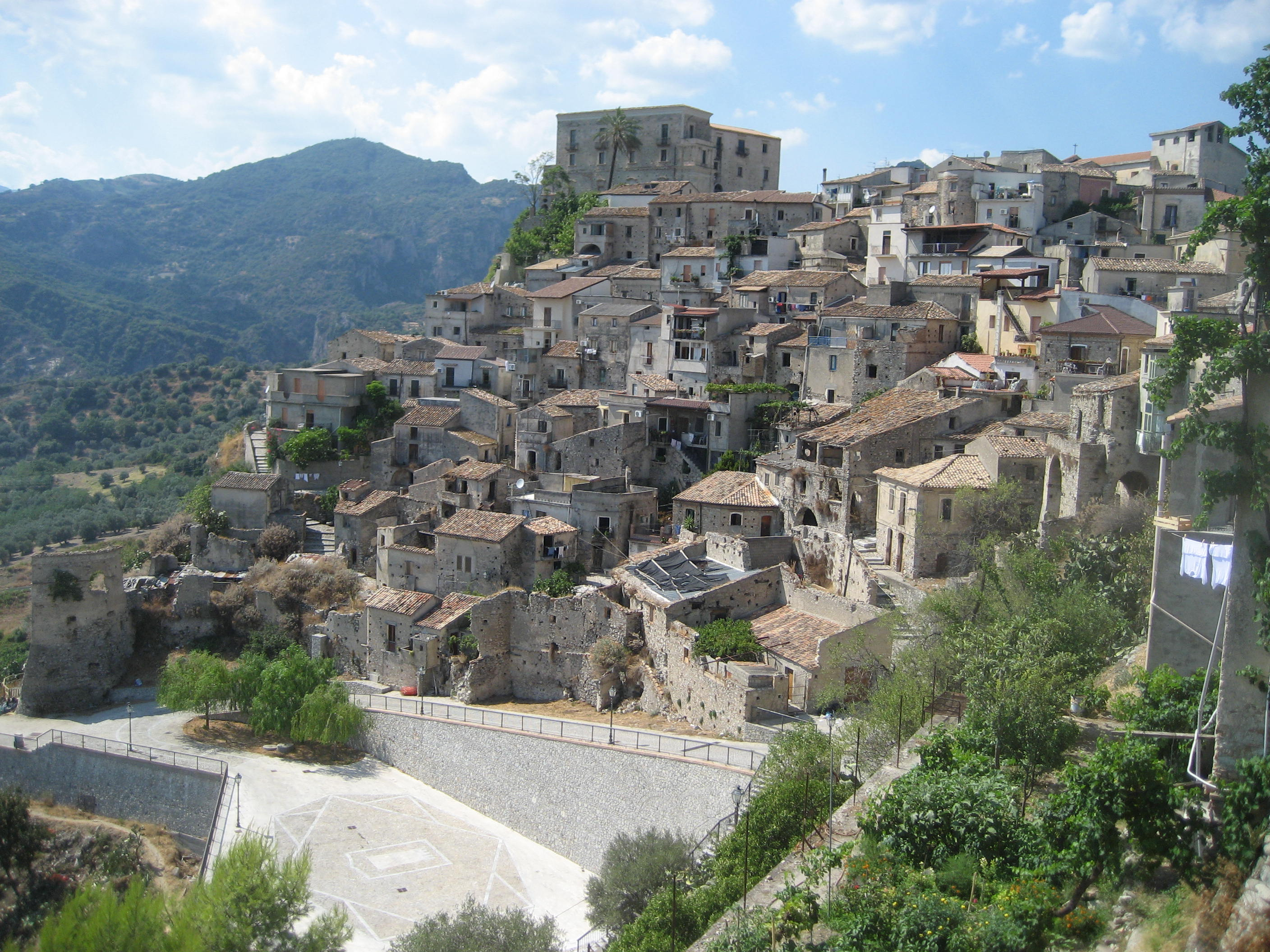

- Coat of arms

- Location within Italy Location within Calabria
- Coordinates: 38°25′N 16°27′E
- Country: Italy
- Region: Calabria
- Metropolitan city: Reggio Calabria (RC)

Government
  - Mayor: Rocco Mario Clemeno

Area
  - Total: 29.3 km^{2} (11.3 sq mi)

Population (December 2007)
  - Total: 1,308
  - Density: 44.6/km^{2} (116/sq mi)
- Demonym: Placanichesi
- Time zone: UTC+1 (CET)
  - Summer (DST): UTC+2 (CEST)
- Postal code: 89040
- Dialing code: 0964

Placanica (Greek: Λακονηκὰ, romanized: Lakonikà) is a comune (commune or municipality) in the Province of Reggio Calabria in the Italian region Calabria, located about 60 kilometres (37 mi) south of Catanzaro and about 80 kilometres (50 mi) northeast of Reggio Calabria. Placanica borders the following communes: Caulonia, Pazzano, Stignano.

== See also ==
- Vallata dello Stilaro Allaro
