= Melicucco =

- Comune
- Comune di Melicucco
- Location within Italy Location within Calabria
- Coordinates: 38°26′N 16°3′E
- Country: Italy
- Region: Calabria
- Metropolitan city: Reggio Calabria (RC)
- Frazioni: San Fili

Area
  - Total: 6.4 km^{2} (2.5 sq mi)

Population (Dec. 2004)
  - Total: 5,024
  - Density: 780/km^{2} (2,000/sq mi)
- Time zone: UTC+1 (CET)
  - Summer (DST): UTC+2 (CEST)
- Postal code: 89020
- Dialing code: 0966

Melicucco (Greek: Μελικούκος, romanized: Melikoúkos) is a comune (municipality) in the Province of Reggio Calabria in the Italian region Calabria, located about 70 kilometres (43 mi) southwest of Catanzaro and about 50 kilometres (31 mi) northeast of Reggio Calabria. As of 31 December 2004, it had a population of 5,024 and an area of 6.4 square kilometres (2.5 mi^{2}).

The municipality of Melicucco contains the frazione (subdivision) San Fili (Greek: Aghia Phyli).

Melicucco borders the following municipalities: Anoia, Cittanova, Feroleto della Chiesa, Polistena, Rosarno.

== Demographic evolution ==
Historical population

Year	Pop.	±%
1861	989	—
1871	1,018	+2.9%
1881	1,007	−1.1%
1901	1,363	+35.4%
1911	1,719	+26.1%

Year	Pop.	±%
1921	1,809	+5.2%
1931	2,487	+37.5%
1936	2,495	+0.3%
1951	3,069	+23.0%
1961	3,449	+12.4%

Year	Pop.	±%
1971	3,813	+10.6%
1981	4,358	+14.3%
1991	5,063	+16.2%
2001	4,996	−1.3%

Source: Data from ISTAT
