= Stignano =

Stignano Greek: Stenano
- Comune
- Comune di Stignano
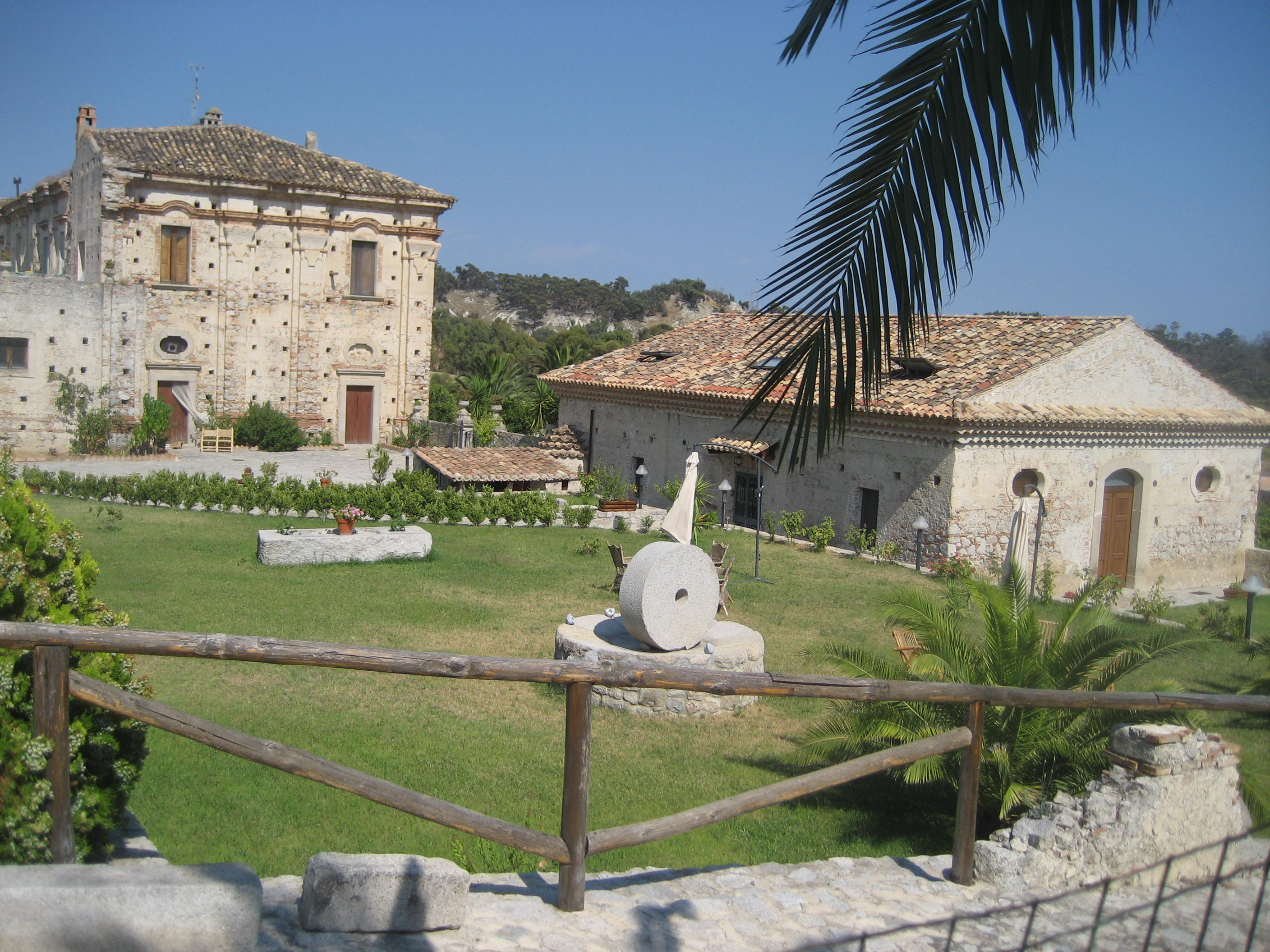
- Villa Caristo in Stignano.

- Coat of arms

- Location within Italy Location within Calabria
- Coordinates: 38°25′N 16°28′E
- Country: Italy
- Region: Calabria
- Metropolitan city: Reggio Calabria (RC)
- Frazioni: Stignano mare, Favaco, Sala, Colture, Scinà

Government
  - Mayor: Giuseppe Trono

Area
  - Total: 17.3 km^{2} (6.7 sq mi)
- Elevation: 343 m (1,125 ft)

Population (October 2006)
  - Total: 1,372
  - Density: 79.3/km^{2} (205/sq mi)
- Demonym: Stignanesi
- Time zone: UTC+1 (CET)
  - Summer (DST): UTC+2 (CEST)
- Postal code: 89040
- Dialing code: 0964

Stignano is a comune (municipality) in the Province of Reggio Calabria in the Italian region Calabria, located about 50 kilometres (31 mi) south of Catanzaro and about 80 kilometres (50 mi) northeast of Reggio Calabria. Stignano borders the following municipalities: Camini, Caulonia, Pazzano, Placanica, Riace, Stilo.
