= Francesco Anile =

Italian tenor

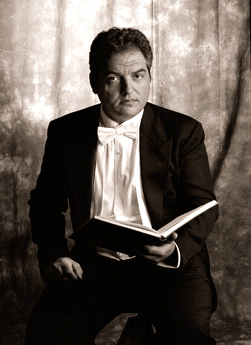
Francesco Anile

Francesco Anile (born 12 February, 1962 in Polistena) is an Italian tenor. He regularly sings in Italy and abroad, performing in theatres such as the Teatro Massimo in Palermo and San Carlo in Naples. Turandot, Norma and Otello are some of the works of his repertory which he plays enthusiastically. In March 2009, he was Manrico in Verdi's Il trovatore, and he has performed Canio in Pagliacci, directed by Franco Zeffirelli.

== Biography ==
Graduated in clarinet and singing at the "F. Cilea" Conservatory of Reggio Calabria, Francesco Anile completed his studies with the baritone Aldo Protti in Cremona, and later as a tenor with Ottavio Taddei in Firenze. In 2001, he took a high-specialization course at Opera Verdi Festival in Parma, under the supervision of Renata Scotto.

Anile made his New York City Opera debut on the NYCO's Opening Night for the 2016-17 season, on September 8, 2016 in a new production double bill of two operas that both premiered in May 1892. He debuted as Canio in Pagliacci directed by Lev Pugliese with conductor James Meena leading the NYCO Orchestra at Rose Theater at Jazz at Lincoln Center's Rose Hall. New York Classical Review wrote: "Anile ... has the voice: a clear, expressive instrument that pleasantly “pings” above the orchestra, and equally, what appears to be a fountain of acting chops. In the famous scene in which Canio realizes that Nedda has been unfaithful, the soft sobbing into his costume was undeniably affecting. And when he leaped onstage to open the traveling show, his drunkenness was believable, not overdone." The Huffington Post wrote: "Anile’s Canio was a virile, force of nature performance."

== Awards ==
Finalist in several nationwide competitions, he won the first prize "E. Bastianini" at the Grandi Voci Toscane in Campi Bisensio and the third prize at the "M. Del Monaco" in Marsala.

== Conductors and directors ==
Francesco Anile has worked with some of the more notable international conductors, such as Nello Santi, Maurizio Benini, Evelino Pidò, Maurizio Arena, Gianandrea Noseda, Massimo Pradella, Niksa Bareza, Loris Voltolini, Stefano Ranzani, Peter Mianiti, Antonio Pirolli, Giampaolo Bisanti, Patrick Fourniller, and Julian Kovatchev. He also worked with several internationally renowned directors, such as Eimuntas Nekrosius, Roberto De Simone, Gianfranco de Bosio, Federico Tiezzi, Plamen Kartalof, Henning Brockhaus, Pierfrancesco Maestrini, Aldo Tarabella, and J. Peter Messner.

== Repertoire ==
Over a number of few years, Francesco Anile's repertory has gradually grown enriched by major roles, such as: Cavaradossi (Tosca), Pinkerton (Madama Butterfly), Luigi (Tabarro), Ishmael (Nabucco), Manrico (Il trovatore), Duke of Mantua (Rigoletto), and Radamès (Aida).

His vocal timbre has recently improved, changing him into a lyric and dramatic tenor. He has reached a heavier vocal weight, enabling his voice to be "pushed" to dramatic climaxes without strain. It is the reason why he now prefers roles such as Calaf (Turandot), Cavaliere Des Grieux (Manon Lescaut), Canio (Pagliacci), Pollione (Norma) and Otello.

He made his Metropolitan Opera debut on April 23, 2016 in the role of Otello, replacing Aleksandrs Antonenko, who lost his voice near the end of the opera.

He also interprets the Messa di Requiem by Verdi, the Messa di Gloria by Puccini and the Messe à S. Cecile by Bizet.

=== Performances ===
Year	n.	Title	Composer	Role	Theatre	City
	76	Aida	G. Verdi	Radames	Seul Art Center	Seul - Korea
	75	Otello	G. Verdi	Otello	Teatro Regio	Torino
	74	Cavalleria Rusticana	P. Mascagni	Turiddu	Teatro Sociale	Como
	73	Turandot	G. Puccini	Calaf	Teatro Lirico	Cagliari
	72	Norma	V. Bellini	Pollione	Teatro Lirico	Cagliari
2014	71	Tosca	G. Puccini	Cavaradossi	teatro Politeama	Lecce
	70	Tosca	G. Puccini	Cavaradossi	Bassano Opera Festival	Bassano del Grappa
	69	Pagliacci	R. Leoncavallo	Canio	Teatro Lirico	Cagliari
	68	Otello	G. Verdi	Otello	Teatro degli Arcimboldi	Milano
	67	Otello	G. Verdi	Otello	Teatro Sociale di Como	Como
	66	Aida	G. Verdi	Radames	Teatro Nazionale	Kiev - Ukraine
	65	Il tabarro	G. Puccini	Luigi	Gran Teatro Puccini	Torre del Lago (LU)
	64	Cavalleria rusticana	P. Mascagni	Turiddu	Gran Teatro Puccini	Torre del Lago (LU)
	63	Aida	G. Verdi	Radames	Arena Romana di Viminacium	Belgrado - Serbia
	62	Pagliacci	R. Leoncavallo	Canio	Teatro Coliseo	Buenos Aires - Argentine
	61	Otello	G. Verdi	Otello	Teatro Lirico di Cagliari	Cagliari
2013	60	Manon Lescaut	G. Puccini	Des Grieux	Hamburgische Staatsoper	Amburgo - Germany
	59	Pagliacci	R. Leoncavallo	Canio	Teatro Comunale	Bologna
	58	Pagliacci	R. Leoncavallo	Canio	Festival Lirico	Ascoli Piceno
2012	57	Turandot	G. Puccini	Calaf	Teatro Comunale	Bologna
	56	Madama Butterfly	G. Puccini	Pinkerton	Seoul Arts Center	Seul - Korea
	55	Turandot	G. Puccini	Calaf	Busan Teatro Nazionale	Busan - Korea
	54	Aida	G. Verdi	Radames	Terme di Caracalla	Roma
	53	Manon Lescaut	G. Puccini	Des Grieux	London (SBC)	Londra - UK
	52	Manon Lescaut	G. Puccini	Des Grieux	Teatro del Maggio Fiorentino	Firenze
2011	51	Cavalleria rusticana	P. Mascagni	Turiddu	Teatro alla Scala	Milano
	50	Trovatore	G. Verdi	Manrico	Macao Music Festival	Macao - China
	49	Pagliacci	R. Leoncavallo	Canio	Teatro G. Di Stefano	trapani
	48	Cavalleria rusticana	P. Mascagni	Turiddu	Teatro G. Di Stefano	Trapani
	47	Aida	G. Verdi	Radames	Teatro Massimo Palermo	Palermo
	46	Carmen	G. Bizet	Don Josè	Cairo Opera House	Cairo - Egypt
	45	Requiem	G. Verdi	Tenore	Cairo Symphony Orchestra	Cairo - Egypt
2010	44	Tosca	G. Puccini	Cavaradossi	Limoges Teatro Comunale	Limoges - France
	43	Pagliacci	R. Leoncavallo	Canio	Teatro Marrucino di Chieti	Chieti
	42	Manon Lescaut	G. Puccini	Des Grieux	Teatro La Fenice di Venezia	Venezia
	41	Norma	V. Bellini	Pollione	Teatro Sociale	Trento
	40	Norma	V. Bellini	Pollione	Teatro Sociale	Como
	39	Norma	V. Bellini	Pollione	Teatro Ponchielli	Cremona
	38	Norma	V. Bellini	Pollione	Teatro Fraschini	Pavia
	37	Norma	V. Bellini	Pollione	Teatro Giuseppe Verdi	Pisa
	36	Madama Butterfly	G. Puccini	Pinkerton	Teatro San Carolo di Napoli	Napoli
	35	Pagliacci	R. Leoncavallo	Canio	Teatro Massimo di Palermo	Palermo
	34	Cavalleria rusticana	P. Mascagni	Turiddu	Teatro Lirico di Cagliari	Cagliari
	33	Il trovatore	g. Verdi	Manrico	Teatro Pérez Galdòs	Las Palmas de Gran Canaria
	32	Pagliacci	R. Leoncavallo	Canio	Teatro del Maggio Fiorentino	Firenze
	31	Turandot	G. Puccini	Calaf	Teatro Filarmonico	Verona
2009	30	Turandot	G. Puccini	Calaf	Opera de Massy	Massy - France
	29	Tosca	G. Puccini	Cavaradossi	Teatro Rendano	Cosenza
	28	Aida	G. Verdi	Radames	Teatro Massimo	Palermo
	27	Turandot	G. Puccini	Calaf	Teatro Grande	Brescia
	26	Turandot	G. Puccini	Calaf	Teatro Ponchielli	Cremona
	25	Turandot	G. Puccini	Calaf	Teatro dell'Aquila	Fermo
	24	Turandot	G. Puccini	Calaf	Teatro Fraschini	Pavia
	23	Turandot	G. Puccini	Calaf	Teatro Sociale di Como	Como
	22	Cavalleria rusticana	G. Mascagni	Turiddu	Teatro delle Asturie	Gijon - Spain
	21	Aida	G. Verdi	Radames	Terme di Caracalla	Roma
	20	Manon Lescaut	G. Puccini	Des Grieux	Teatro Massimo	Catania
	19	Manon Lescaut	G. Puccini	Des Grieux	Teatro Massimo	Palermo
	18	Norma	V. Bellini	Pollione	Teatro Comunale	Bologna
	17	Iris	P. Mascagni	Osaka-Jor	Teatro Verdi	Trieste
2008	16	Il tabarro	G. Puccini	Luigi	Teatro Alighieri	Ravenna
	15	Madama Butterfly	G. Puccini	Pinkerton	Daegu National Theater	Seoul - Korea
	14	Cavalleria rusticana	P. Mascagni	Turiddu	Croatian National Theatre	Zagabria - Croatia
	13	Cavalleria rusticana	P. Mascagni	Turiddu	Bunka Kaikan Theatre	Tokyo - Japan
	12	Cavalleria rusticana	P. Mascagni	Turiddu	Biwako Hall Theatre	Otzu - Japan
	11	Cavalleria rusticana	P. Mascagni	Turiddu	Teatro Massimo	Palermo
	10	Cavalleria rusticana	P. Mascagni	Turiddu	Teatro San Carlo	Napoli
	9	Aida	G. Verdi	Radames	Seoul Arts Center	Seul - Korea
2007	8	Il tabarro	G. Puccini	Luigi	Teatro del Giglio	Lucca
	7	Il trovatore	G. Verdi	Manrico	SNG Opera in balet	Ljubljana - Slovenia
	6	Il trovatore	G. Verdi	Manrico	Teatro Opera	Zagabria - Croatia
2006	5	Otello	G. Verdi	Otello	Seoul Arts Center	Seul - Korea
	4	Carmen	G. Bizet	Don Josè	Cairo Opera House	Il Cairo - Egypt
	3	Madama Butterfly	G. Puccini	Pinkerton	Cairo Opera House	Il Cairo - Egypt
2005	2	Il trovatore	G. Verdi	Manrico	Teatro Verdi	Campobasso
2004	1	Aida	G. Verdi	Radames	Arena Antica	Plovdiv - Bulgaria
