= Samo, Calabria =

Samo Samu (Sicilian) Σάμος (Greek)
- Comune
- Comune di Samo
- Location within Italy Location within Calabria
- Coordinates: 38°04′N 16°04′E
- Country: Italy
- Region: Calabria
- Metropolitan city: Reggio Calabria (RC)

Area
  - Total: 50 km^{2} (19 sq mi)
- Elevation: 390 m (1,280 ft)

Population (2001)
  - Total: 1,091
  - Density: 22/km^{2} (57/sq mi)
- Time zone: UTC+1 (CET)
  - Summer (DST): UTC+2 (CEST)
- Postal code: 89030
- Dialing code: 0964
- Website: http://comune.samo.rc.it/

Samo (Calabrian: Samu; Calabrian Greek: Σάμος) is a small town and comune located in the Province of Reggio Calabria, southern Italy. Samo has a population of 1,090, but this increases seasonally. Samo is about 10 kilometres (6 mi) inland and about 390 metres (1,280 ft) above sea level. It is located at the foot of Aspromonte National Park.

Samo has a number of fresh water springs running in the nearby mountains and through the town which are used by most of the population for drinking.

== History ==
Samo has been historically a city of much trade and import. From the 16th century onwards, people would trade sheepskins, lambs and pineapple.

== Main sights ==
The main attractions of Samo are the ruins of the old town destroyed in the 1908 Messina earthquake and hiking in the nearby Aspromonte National Park.

== Sport ==
The town has a football team called AC Samo and is currently playing in the lower regional divisions.

== Twin towns ==
Samo is the sister town of the Greek island of Samos.
