= Feroleto della Chiesa =

Feroleto della Chiesa Greek: Farlìto
- Comune
- Comune di Feroleto della Chiesa
- Location within Italy Location within Calabria
- Coordinates: 38°28′N 16°4′E
- Country: Italy
- Region: Calabria
- Metropolitan city: Reggio Calabria (RC)
- Frazioni: Plaesano

Area
  - Total: 7.6 km^{2} (2.9 sq mi)

Population (Dec. 2004)
  - Total: 1,849
  - Density: 240/km^{2} (630/sq mi)
- Time zone: UTC+1 (CET)
  - Summer (DST): UTC+2 (CEST)
- Postal code: 89050
- Dialing code: 0966

Feroleto della Chiesa (Calabrian: Ferlitù) is a comune (municipality) in the Province of Reggio Calabria in the Italian region Calabria, located about 70 kilometres (43 mi) southwest of Catanzaro and about 50 kilometres (31 mi) northeast of Reggio Calabria. As of 31 December 2004, it had a population of 1,849 and an area of 7.6 square kilometres (2.9 mi^{2}).

== Geography ==
The municipality of Feroleto della Chiesa contains the frazione (subdivision) Plaesano.

Feroleto della Chiesa borders the following municipalities: Anoia, Galatro, Laureana di Borrello, Maropati, Melicucco, Rosarno.

== Demographic evolution ==
Historical population

| Year | Pop. | ±% |
|---|---|---|
| 1861 | 1,140 | — |
| 1871 | 1,044 | −8.4% |
| 1881 | 944 | −9.6% |
| 1901 | 1,256 | +33.1% |
| 1911 | 1,453 | +15.7% |

| Year | Pop. | ±% |
|---|---|---|
| 1921 | 1,763 | +21.3% |
| 1931 | 1,785 | +1.2% |
| 1936 | 1,884 | +5.5% |
| 1951 | 2,028 | +7.6% |
| 1961 | 2,135 | +5.3% |

| Year | Pop. | ±% |
|---|---|---|
| 1971 | 2,035 | −4.7% |
| 1981 | 1,954 | −4.0% |
| 1991 | 2,018 | +3.3% |
| 2001 | 1,872 | −7.2% |

Source: Data from ISTAT
