= Maropati =

Maropati Greek: Monopation
- Comune
- Comune di Maropati
- Location within Italy Location within Calabria
- Coordinates: 38°26′N 16°6′E
- Country: Italy
- Region: Calabria
- Metropolitan city: Reggio Calabria (RC)
- Frazioni: Tritanti

Area
  - Total: 10.3 km^{2} (4.0 sq mi)
- Elevation: 239 m (784 ft)

Population (Dec. 2004)
  - Total: 1,655
  - Density: 161/km^{2} (416/sq mi)
- Demonym: Maropatesi
- Time zone: UTC+1 (CET)
  - Summer (DST): UTC+2 (CEST)
- Postal code: 89020
- Dialing code: 0966
- Website: Official website

Maropati (Calabrian: Maropàtri; Greek: Monopation) is a comune (municipality) in the Province of Reggio Calabria in the Italian region Calabria. It is located about 70 kilometres (43 mi) southwest of Catanzaro and about 50 kilometres (31 mi) northeast of Reggio Calabria. As of 31 December 2004, it had a population of 1,655 and an area of 10.3 square kilometres (4.0 mi^{2}).

The municipality of Maropati contains the frazione (subdivision) Tritanti.

Maropati borders municipalities of Anoia, Feroleto della Chiesa, Galatro, and Giffone.

== Demographic evolution ==
Historical population

| Year | Pop. | ±% |
|---|---|---|
| 1861 | 2,079 | — |
| 1871 | 2,157 | +3.8% |
| 1881 | 2,136 | −1.0% |
| 1901 | 2,103 | −1.5% |
| 1911 | 2,489 | +18.4% |

| Year | Pop. | ±% |
|---|---|---|
| 1921 | 2,648 | +6.4% |
| 1931 | 2,701 | +2.0% |
| 1936 | 2,778 | +2.9% |
| 1951 | 2,973 | +7.0% |
| 1961 | 2,653 | −10.8% |

| Year | Pop. | ±% |
|---|---|---|
| 1971 | 2,106 | −20.6% |
| 1981 | 2,028 | −3.7% |
| 1991 | 1,836 | −9.5% |
| 2001 | 1,736 | −5.4% |

Source: Data from ISTAT
