= Ciaffone =

Ciaffone (pronounced [tʃafˈfoːne]) is an Italian surname from Central Italy. Notable people with the surname include:

- Bob Ciaffone (1940–2022), American author and poker player
- Larry Ciaffone (1924–1991), American baseball player

== See also ==
- Giaffone
