= Bruzzano Zeffirio =

Bruzzano Zeffirio Greek: Zephyrion
- Comune
- Comune di Bruzzano Zeffirio
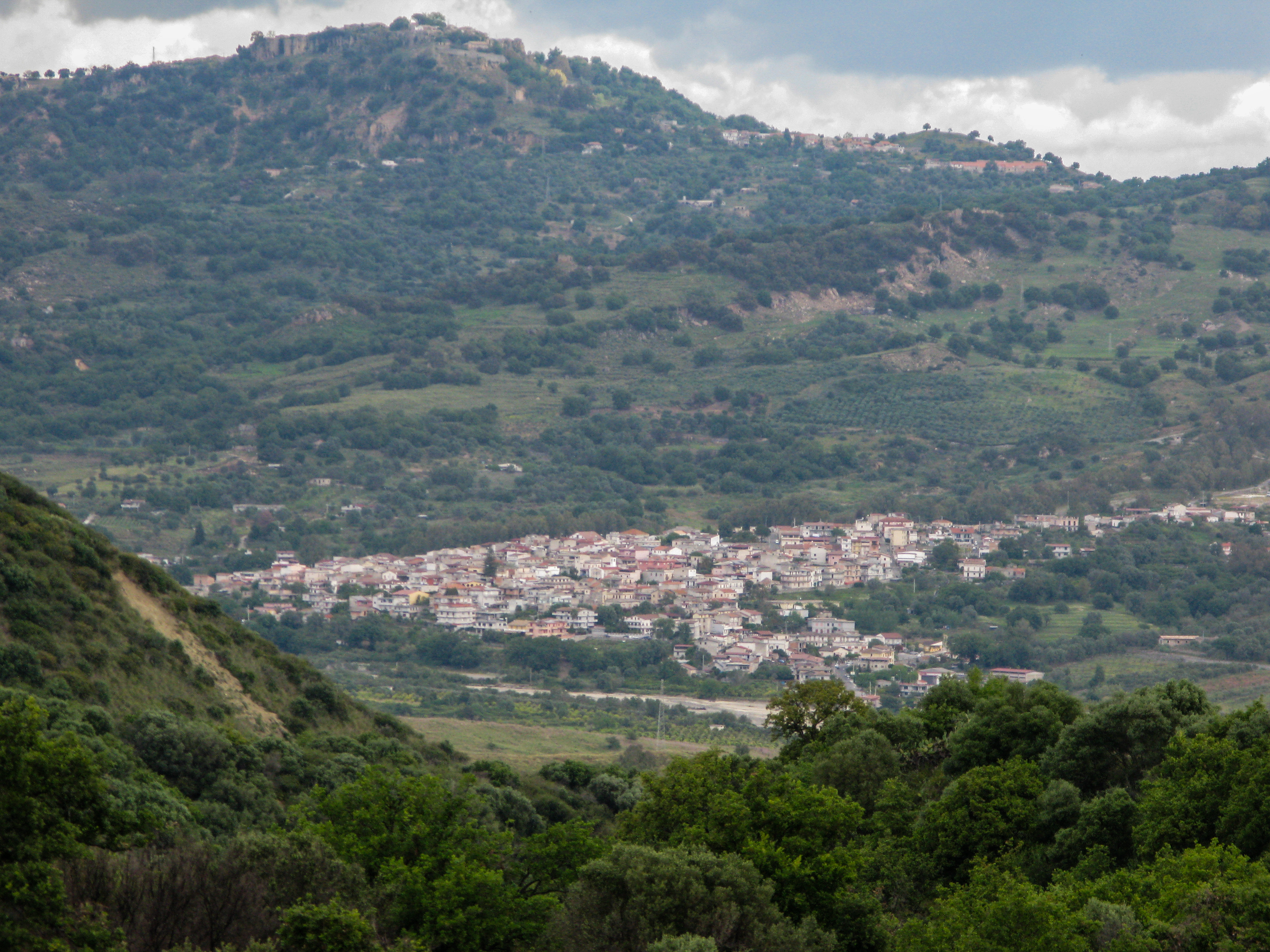

- Location within Italy Location within Calabria
- Coordinates: 38°1′N 16°5′E
- Country: Italy
- Region: Calabria
- Metropolitan city: Reggio Calabria (RC)

Government
  - Mayor: Francesco Cuzzola

Area
  - Total: 20.9 km^{2} (8.1 sq mi)

Population (December 2006)
  - Total: 1,255
  - Density: 60.0/km^{2} (156/sq mi)
- Time zone: UTC+1 (CET)
  - Summer (DST): UTC+2 (CEST)
- Postal code: 89030
- Dialing code: 0964

Bruzzano Zeffirio (Greek: Zephyrion) is a comune (municipality) in the Province of Reggio Calabria in the Italian region Calabria, located about 110 kilometres (68 mi) southwest of Catanzaro and about 40 kilometres (25 mi) southeast of Reggio Calabria.

Its territory is included in the Aspromonte National Park.
