= San Ferdinando =

- Comune
- Comune di San Ferdinando
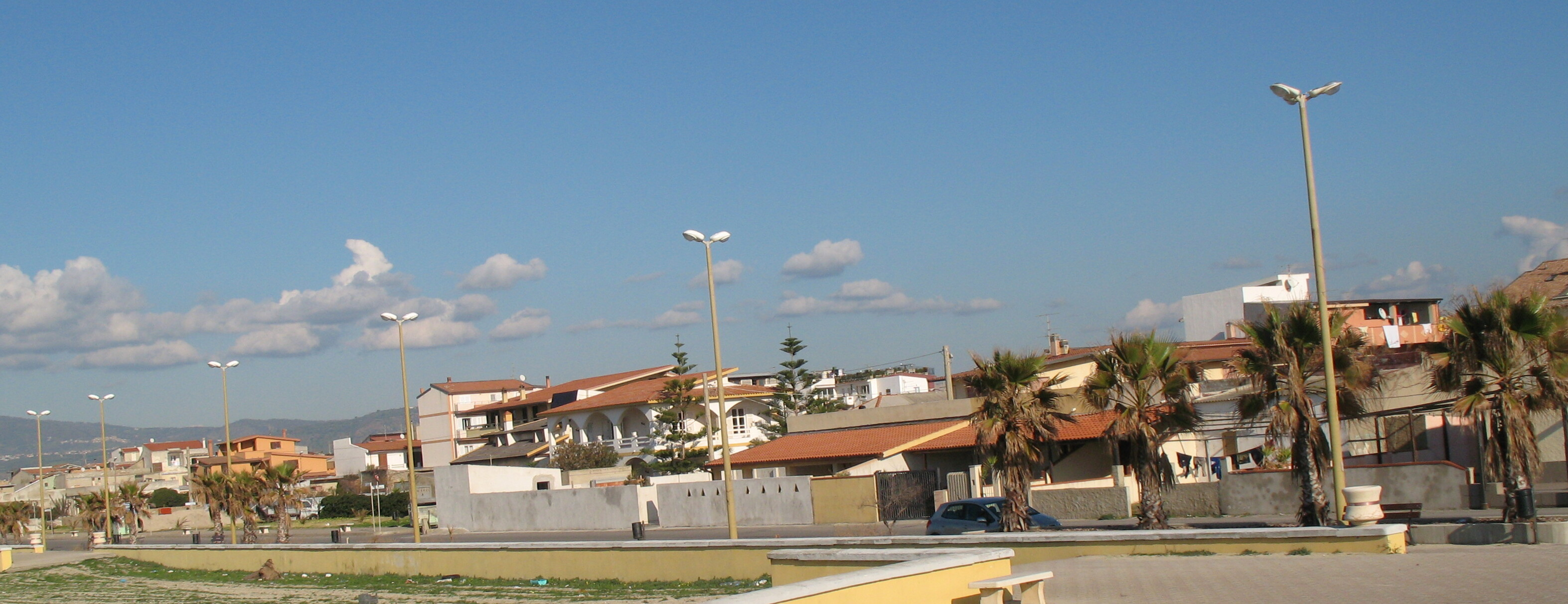

- Location within Italy Location within Calabria
- Coordinates: 38°29′N 15°55′E
- Country: Italy
- Region: Calabria
- Metropolitan city: Reggio Calabria (RC)
- Frazioni: Eranova, Villaggio Praia

Area
  - Total: 14.0 km^{2} (5.4 sq mi)

Population (Dec. 2004)
  - Total: 4,487
  - Density: 321/km^{2} (830/sq mi)
- Demonym: Sanferdinandesi
- Time zone: UTC+1 (CET)
  - Summer (DST): UTC+2 (CEST)
- Postal code: 89026
- Dialing code: 0966

San Ferdinando (Calabrian: San Ferdinandu) is a comune (municipality) in the Province of Reggio Calabria in the Italian region Calabria, located about 80 kilometres (50 mi) southwest of Catanzaro and about 45 kilometres (28 mi) northeast of Reggio Calabria. As of 31 December 2004, it had a population of 4,487 and an area of 14.0 square kilometres (5.4 mi^{2}).

The municipality of San Ferdinando contains the frazioni (subdivisions, mainly villages and hamlets) Eranova and Villaggio Praia.

San Ferdinando borders the following municipalities: Nicotera, Gioia Tauro, and Rosarno.

== Early history ==
The area around San Ferdinando is within the borders of the historic town of Rosarno, which along with the town of Nicotera is the area of the ancient Greek city of Medma. Present day Rosarno and its environs sprung up during the Byzantine Era and appeared for the first time in history in a document in 1037. The rule of Rosarno was greatly contested, due to its strategic importance in giving a hold over of the fertile Mesima River valley and was controlled by various feudal lords, including the Ruffo and the Pignatelli families. Situated along the sea, San Ferdinando was a planned community to support a major public works project of the early 19th Century to transform the malaria-ridden Mesima valley into a commercial agricultural town. Following the five major 1783 Calabrian earthquakes, the Mesima River Valley and the Rosarno plain were said to have sunk nearly a meter creating significant shifts in water flow and the creation of lakes and swamps. This change in the geology and ecology of the area provided for an environment for malaria to breed. The earthquakes and subsequent malaria epidemic resulted in upwards of 50,000 deaths in the region and is said to have halved the population by the start of the 19th Century. This cataclysm left no passable roads and the destruction of a majority of the buildings in the area.

In response to these disasters the government set out to rebuild to alleviate unemployment, poverty and the backwardness that reigned in the southern provinces. This included a plan for better access though roads and bridges and the reclamation of the unhealthy swamps and lakes. In 1818, King Ferdinand I of the Two Sicilies authorized a government financed project for the reclamation of wetlands in Rosarno, as proposed by General Vito Nunziante. The General was familiar with the local farmers, who were experts in the cultivation of hemp, cereals, flax and breeding of silkworms and proposed the development of an agricultural town that would employ the latest best practice in farming. After the wetlands were drained and made suitable for cultivation, a plan for small houses and a church was created and families from nearby Tropea and the surrounding villages settled there.

In 1823, Pasquale Barbalace came from nearby Carciadi as the first settler, with his wife and five children - Antonia (née Punturiero), Francesco, Pietro, Carlo, Giacomo and Antonio. After he settled with his family in San Ferdinando, he father eight more children and was known for his extraordinary work ethic and dynamism in various efforts in establishing the community. During the next few years (1823–1825) the families that followed Mr. Barbalace were: Pantano and Tavella from S. Nicolò di Ricadi; Loiacono, Celi and Polimeni from S. Nicolò; Petracca from Lampazone; Rizzo, Taccone, and Naso from Spilinga; Tripodi from Brivadi; Loiacono from Orsigliadi; Punturiero from Carciadi; and Falduti from Caroniti. As financial and social prospects were proving positive in this new enterprise, successive years brought the families of:Zungri and Mumoli from Lampazone; Bagnato from Comerconi; and Rombolà from Brattirò.

Pasquale Barbalace was the Nunziante family's administrator for the village and the family's agricultural business. The first village that he is said to have founded was called Romulus, after one of the legendary twin founders of Rome who were raised by a she-wolf. After many years working hard in San Ferdinando, Barbalace died aged 96. His son Pasquale continued as the Nunziante family's administrator and also served as the mayor of Rosarno starting in 1860 for several terms.

The original six houses of San Ferdinando, remembered today as the “case del Principe”, were built away from the Mesima River and close to the beach in the current area of Via Bologna and Via Como and near a modest palazzo that he General Nunziante built for himself (recently the home of the heirs of Pasquale Loiacono). As more families came houses were built along Via Bologna, Via Salerno, Via Rosarno, and to the corner of Via Magazzini, as well as the Church of the Forgiveness (Chiesa del Perdono). The small one-story houses, which were organized around a courtyard, included a bedroom, kitchen, pantry and toilet and were made of volcanic stone sent by boat from the Aeolian Island of Lipari by Marquis, Don Francesco Barresi, father of General Nunziante. Some of these still remain standing, despite the progress of reconstruction in the center of town.

As the town grew in size and citizens prospered, the town that was locally known as Casette was renamed San Ferdinando in honor of the King, who sponsored the development of the area. While archival records document houses being built since 1823, the first record of rents paid for farm houses was in 1840 and a contract dating back to 1842 recording the lease of houses by Don Paolo DeLauretis (heir to Nunziante) for a period of two years to the Pantano, Loiacono, and others of the original families of San Ferdinando. The base fee was 4 ducats, with 6 ducats for those with individual rooms. In addition to the fees, the tenants were obliged to deforest and improve their property.

Despite the influx of families from the surrounding villages, in 1842 Marchese Nunziante wanted to recruit more skilled manpower for the construction of more houses to grow the commercial enterprise of the town. He turned to the Bourbon government to enlist the work of the men convicted for common crimes, who had demonstrated good behavior and had served less than four years of their sentence. The government agreed and Nunziante paid them a salary, to make sure they were able to be housed and pay the government the penalty associated with their crime. Many men, with the intention to rehabilitate themselves rather than remain in prison took up the offer and worked side-by-side with other settlers. This practice of employing petty criminals lasted for a couple decades until 1862.

The following is a list of these men from the parish records and courts documents during those 20 years: Del Vecchio from Ioppolo; Contartese from Ricadi, Tambaro from Scafati; Naccarato from Cosenza; Pantano from Brivadi; Megna from Coccorino; Russo and Falcone from S. Maria Capua Vetere; Baglivo from Potenza; Bovolo from Torre del Greco; Zavaglia from Polistina; Porretti from Monteleone; and Faggiano, Ferraro, Pignatelli, and Cusano from various other parts of the kingdom. Most came from Campania, Sicilia and Basilicata.

== Demographic evolution ==
Historical population

Year	Pop.	±%
1861	784	—
1871	813	+3.7%
1881	1,014	+24.7%
1901	1,640	+61.7%
1911	2,081	+26.9%

Year	Pop.	±%
1921	2,283	+9.7%
1931	2,559	+12.1%
1936	2,897	+13.2%
1951	3,866	+33.4%
1961	3,901	+0.9%

Year	Pop.	±%
1971	3,928	+0.7%
1981	4,286	+9.1%
1991	4,335	+1.1%
2001	4,339	+0.1%

Source: Data from ISTAT
