= Giffoni =

Giffoni may refer to:

- Giffoni Sei Casali, Italian municipality of the Province of Salerno
- Giffoni Valle Piana, Italian municipality of the Province of Salerno
  - Giffoni Film Festival, a children's film festival placed in Giffoni Valle Piana

== See also ==
- Giffone, an Italian municipality of the Province of Reggio Calabria
