= Mammola =

- Comune
- Comune di Mammola
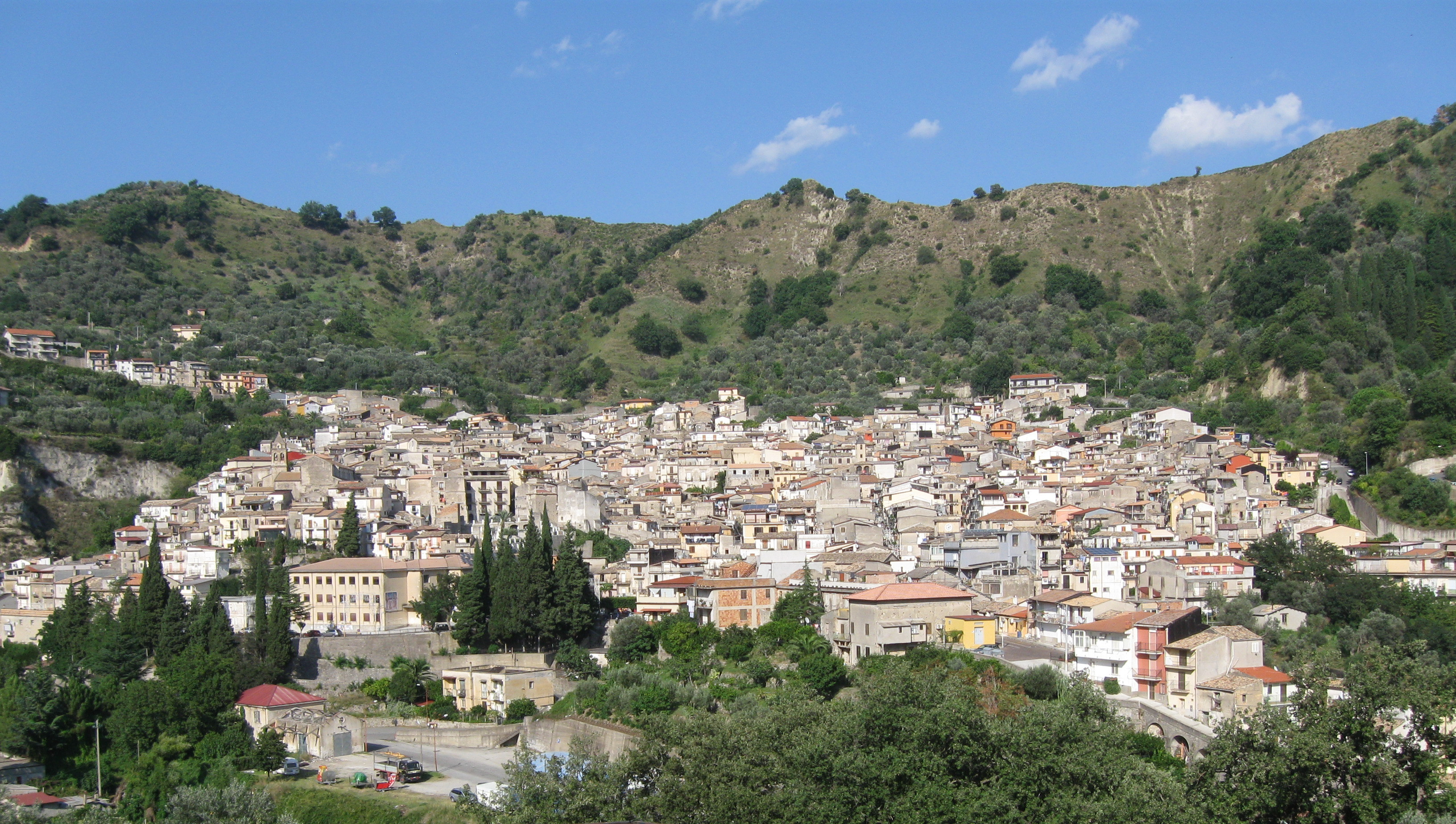

- Location within Italy Location within Calabria
- Coordinates: 38°22′N 16°14′E
- Country: Italy
- Region: Calabria
- Metropolitan city: Reggio Calabria (RC)

Government
  - Mayor: Stefano Raschellà

Area
  - Total: 81.07 km^{2} (31.30 sq mi)
- Elevation: 240/390 m (2.02 ft)

Population (30 September 2017)
  - Total: 2,746
  - Density: 33.87/km^{2} (87.73/sq mi)
- Demonym: Mammolesi
- Time zone: UTC+1 (CET)
  - Summer (DST): UTC+2 (CEST)
- Postal code: 89045
- Dialing code: 0964
- Website: Official website

Mammola is a comune (municipality) in the Metropolitan City of Reggio Calabria in the Italian region Calabria, located about 70 kilometres (43 mi) southwest of Catanzaro and about 60 kilometres (37 mi) northeast of Reggio Calabria.

Mammola borders the following municipalities: Agnana Calabra, Canolo, Cinquefrondi, Galatro, Giffone, Grotteria, San Giorgio Morgeto, Siderno.

== People ==
- Sal Albanese, a former New York City Councilman and candidate for Mayor elections 2013.
- Nick Mancuso, actor.
- Nik Spatari, internationally renowned artist and sculptor, creator and producer of the Park Museum Santa Barbara.
- Alan Barillaro, director, animator and screenwriter.
- Vincenzo Cotroni, Italian Canadian crime boss. Founder of the now called Rizzuto crime family.

== Twin towns ==
- Mezdra, Bulgaria, February 4, 2007
- Saint-Clair-du-Rhône, France, May 17, 2010
