= Cittanova =

- Comune
- Comune di Cittanova
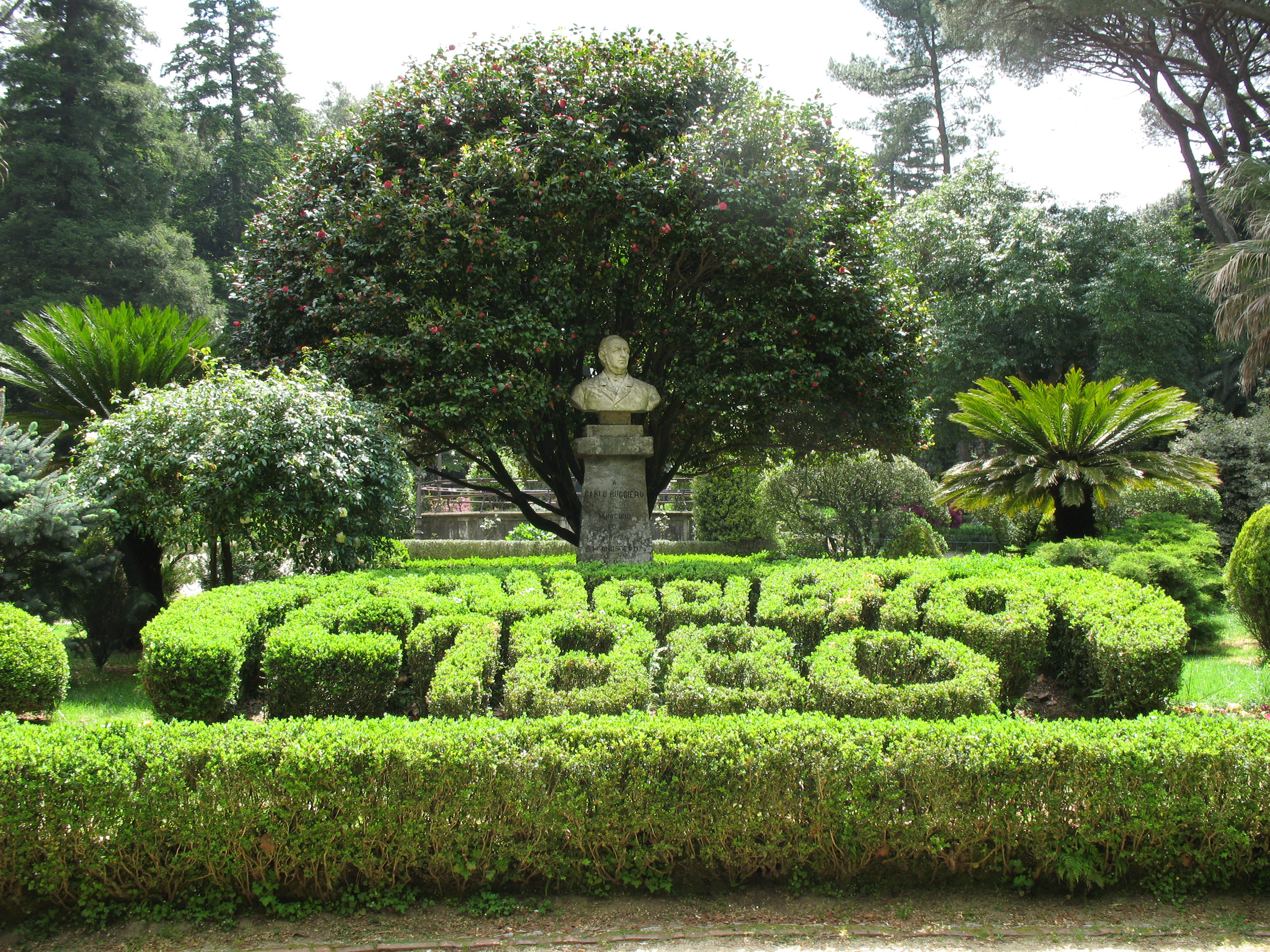
- Villa "Carlo Ruggiero" (entrance).

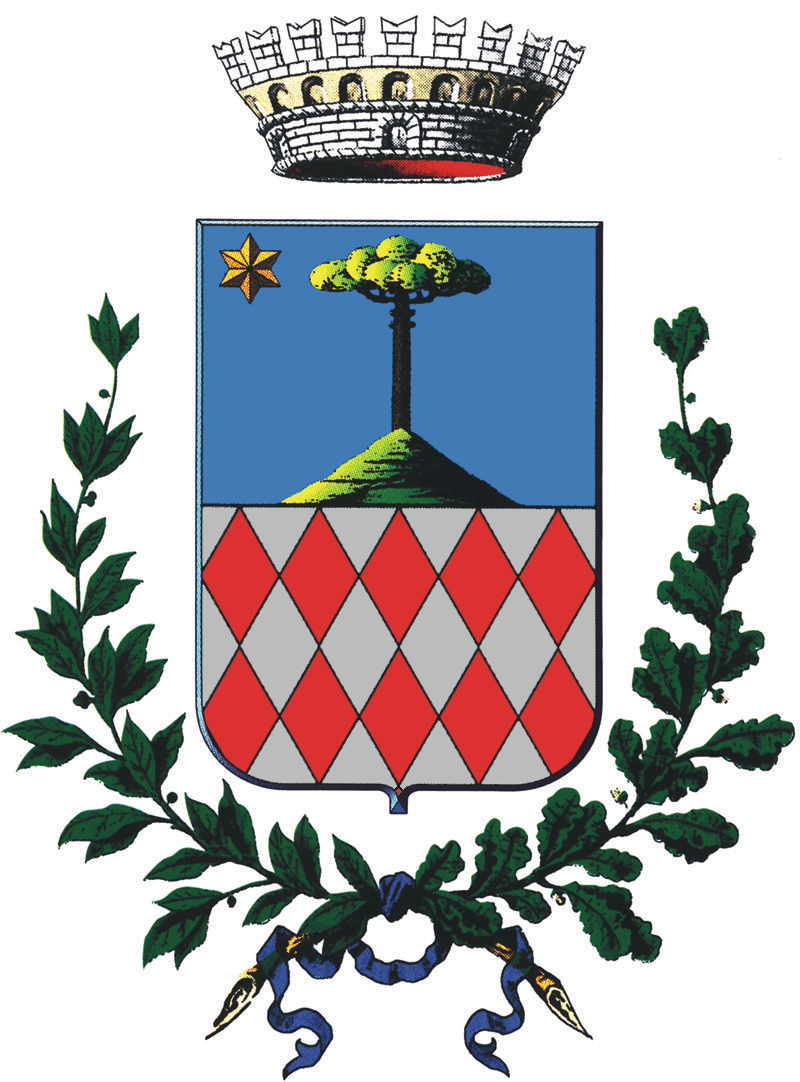
- Coat of arms

- Cittanova within the Province of Reggio Calabria

- Location of Cittanova in Italy Cittanova (Calabria)
- Coordinates: 38°21′N 16°5′E
- Country: Italy
- Region: Calabria
- Metropolitan city: Reggio Calabria (RC)

Government
  - Mayor: Domenico Antico

Area
  - Total: 61.8 km^{2} (23.9 sq mi)
- Elevation: 400 m (1,300 ft)

Population (November 2020)
  - Total: 9,977
  - Density: 161/km^{2} (418/sq mi)
- Demonym: Cittanovesi
- Time zone: UTC+1 (CET)
  - Summer (DST): UTC+2 (CEST)
- Postal code: 89022
- Dialing code: 0966
- Patron saint: St. Jerome
- Saint day: September 30
- Website: Official website

Cittanova is a comune (municipality) in the Metropolitan City of Reggio Calabria in the Italian region Calabria, located about 80 kilometres (50 mi) southwest of Catanzaro and about 45 kilometres (28 mi) northeast of Reggio Calabria.

Located on the slopes of Aspromonte and facing the Gioia Tauro plain, it is characterized by the presence of numerous churches and a public park which extends for 2.65 hectares (6.55 ac).

== Geography ==
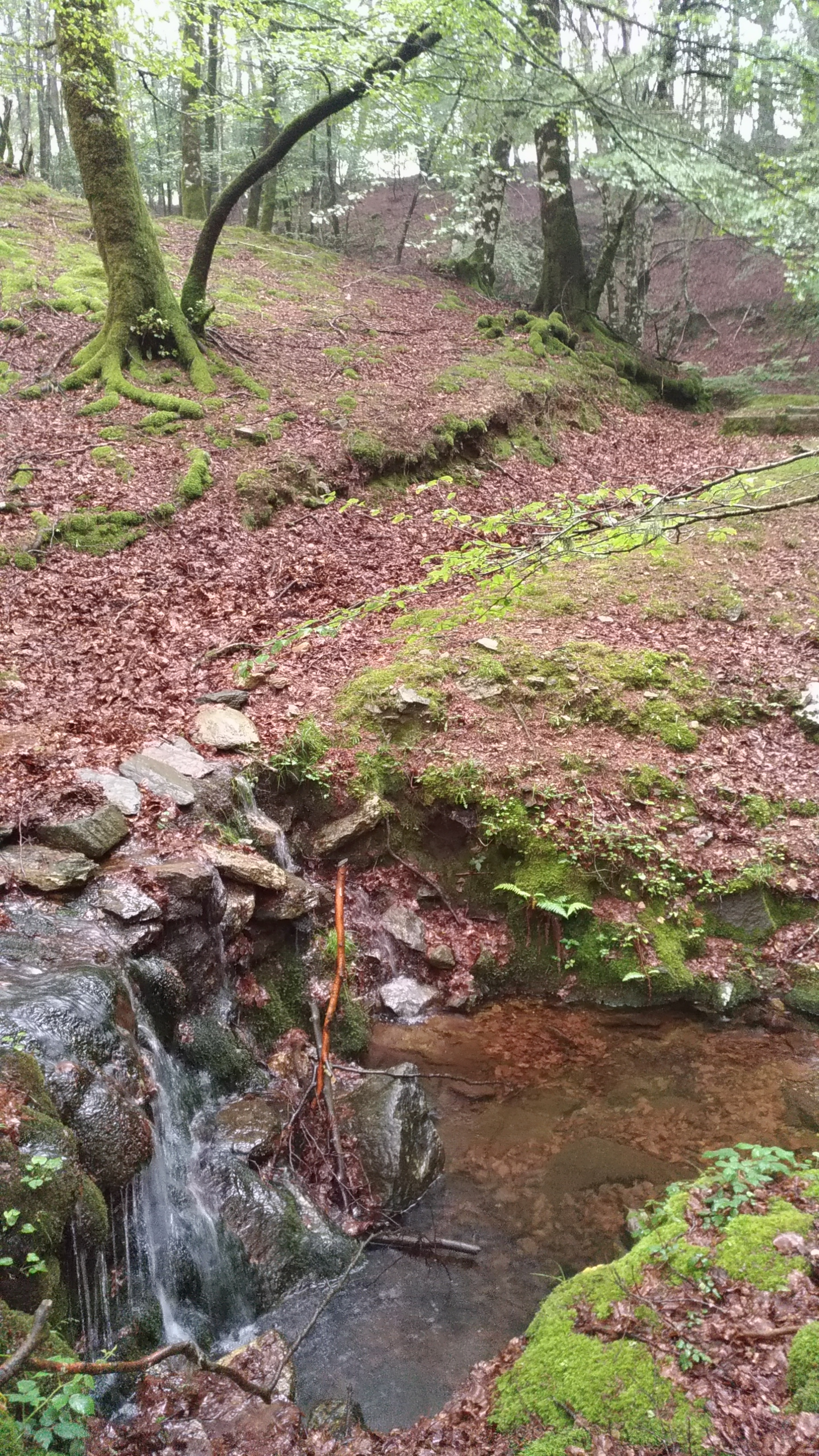
Glimpse of Zomaro plateau

The town is located at the foot of the Aspromonte, on alluvial quaternary soils, consisting of incoherent sands and gravels that cover the large terraces sloping down towards the Gulf of Gioia. Cittanova dominates the Gioia Tauro plain from the highest terrace, the one bordering the massif of the Serre Calabresi, almost in contact between the two lithological formations: alluvial and crystalline.

This geological conformation favors the propagation of earthquakes, as the incoherence of the alluvial cover is increased during earthquakes by the contiguous and underlying crystalline formation. The territory of Cittanova is crossed by the homonymous fault which is part of the Serre-Aspromonte fault system, 30 kilometers long and still active.

The altitude referring to the town hall building is 400 meters above mean sea level, in the municipal area the minimum altitude reaches 77 m above mean sea level while the maximum reaches 996 meters. The surface is 61.98 km^{2} (23.93 sq mi) (about 65% in flat land planted with olive trees and 35% in mountainous wooded land and natural pastures).

The main water courses are the torrents Serra and Vacale.

Main peaks: Melìa plateau (m. 1,000), Zomaro (m. 920) and Mount Cuculo (m. 725).

Zomaro is located on the Melìa plateau, inside the Aspromonte National Park. The flora that characterizes it is mainly composed of beeches, holm oaks, firs and brooms. Also present is Woodwardia radicans, an ancient giant fern which survived the Cenozoic. The fauna has numerous wild boars as well as squirrels, badgers, foxes, owls and black kites. The plateau is also rich in spring waters.

Cittanova borders the following municipalities: Antonimina, Canolo, Ciminà, Gerace, Melicucco, Molochio, Polistena, Rizziconi, Rosarno, San Giorgio Morgeto and Taurianova.

=== Climate ===
The climate is Mediterranean. The plain of Gioia, open to the sea but sheltered from the winds, increases the humidity, making the land particularly fertile.

Climate data for Cittanova
Month	Jan	Feb	Mar	Apr	May	Jun	Jul	Aug	Sep	Oct	Nov	Dec	Year
Daily mean °C (°F)	9 (48)	10 (50)	11 (52)	13 (55)	16 (61)	21 (70)	24 (75)	23 (73)	22 (72)	17 (63)	12 (54)	9 (48)	15.6 (60.1)
Average precipitation mm (inches)	233 (9.2)	164 (6.5)	155 (6.1)	100 (3.9)	92 (3.6)	44 (1.7)	21 (0.8)	27 (1.1)	83 (3.3)	159 (6.3)	234 (9.2)	221 (8.7)	1,533 (60.4)
Source: Ambiente fisico e dissesto idrogeologico del versante tirrenico reggino

== History ==
Cittanova (Italian for "New City") was born in 1618, in the wake of the disastrous earthquake of 1616, as the Nuovo Casale di Curtuladi ("New Hamlet of Curtuladi"), then Casalnuovo upgraded to city status as Cittanova.

The city was all but demolished in the great earthquake of 1783 that damaged Messina.

== Demographics ==
Historical population

Year	Pop.	±%
1861	11,022	—
1871	12,030	+9.1%
1881	11,547	−4.0%
1901	11,575	+0.2%
1911	14,879	+28.5%

Year	Pop.	±%
1921	15,842	+6.5%
1931	18,751	+18.4%
1936	13,796	−26.4%
1951	15,777	+14.4%
1961	12,880	−18.4%

Year	Pop.	±%
1971	11,863	−7.9%
1981	10,926	−7.9%
1991	10,540	−3.5%
2001	10,675	+1.3%
2011	10,344	−3.1%

Source: Data from ISTAT

== Twin towns ==
- Ivangorod, Russia
- Caltanissetta, Italy
- Vimodrone, Italy
