= Cinquefrondi =

Cinquefrondi Griko: Pènte Kàstra
- Comune
- Comune di Cinquefrondi
- Location within Italy Location within Calabria
- Coordinates: 38°25′N 16°6′E
- Country: Italy
- Region: Calabria
- Metropolitan city: Reggio Calabria (RC)

Area
  - Total: 29.95 km^{2} (11.56 sq mi)
- Elevation: 257 m (843 ft)

Population (30 June 2017)
  - Total: 6,503
  - Density: 217.1/km^{2} (562.4/sq mi)
- Demonym: Cinquefrondesi
- Time zone: UTC+1 (CET)
  - Summer (DST): UTC+2 (CEST)
- Postal code: 89021
- Dialing code: 0966
- Patron saint: St. Michael Archangel
- Saint day: 2nd Sunday of May
- Website: Official website

Cinquefrondi (Calabrian: Cincufrùndi or Cincrùnde) is a comune (municipality) in the Metropolitan City of Reggio Calabria in the Italian region Calabria, located about 70 kilometres (43 mi) southwest of Catanzaro and about 50 kilometres (31 mi) northeast of Reggio Calabria.

Cinquefrondi borders the following municipalities: Anoia, Giffone, Mammola, Polistena, San Giorgio Morgeto. It is part of the Aspromonte National Park.

== Geography ==
=== Climate ===
Climate data for Cinquefrondi, Province of Reggio Calabria, Italy
Month	Jan	Feb	Mar	Apr	May	Jun	Jul	Aug	Sep	Oct	Nov	Dec	Year
Mean daily maximum °C (°F)	14.5 (58.1)	14.8 (58.6)	16.0 (60.8)	18.3 (64.9)	22.4 (72.3)	26.4 (79.5)	29.7 (85.5)	29.9 (85.8)	27.2 (81.0)	22.9 (73.2)	18.7 (65.7)	15.7 (60.3)	21.4 (70.5)
Mean daily minimum °C (°F)	9.8 (49.6)	9.6 (49.3)	10.7 (51.3)	12.5 (54.5)	16.1 (61.0)	19.9 (67.8)	23.0 (73.4)	23.5 (74.3)	21.1 (70.0)	17.4 (63.3)	14.0 (57.2)	11.3 (52.3)	15.7 (60.3)
Average rainfall mm (inches)	114.30 (4.50)	99.06 (3.90)	83.82 (3.30)	60.96 (2.40)	33.02 (1.30)	12.70 (0.50)	20.32 (0.80)	25.40 (1.00)	55.88 (2.20)	109.22 (4.30)	106.68 (4.20)	116.84 (4.60)	838.2 (33)
Source: The Weather Channel
