= Agnana Calabra =

Agnana Calabra Griko: Aniàna
- Comune
- Comune di Agnana Calabra
- Location within Italy Location within Calabria
- Coordinates: 38°18′N 16°13′E
- Country: Italy
- Region: Calabria
- Metropolitan city: Reggio Calabria (RC)

Government
  - Mayor: Caterina Furfaro

Area
  - Total: 8.49 km^{2} (3.28 sq mi)
- Elevation: 210 m (690 ft)

Population (30 April 2017)
  - Total: 541
  - Density: 63.7/km^{2} (165/sq mi)
- Demonym: Agnanesi
- Time zone: UTC+1 (CET)
  - Summer (DST): UTC+2 (CEST)
- Postal code: 89040
- Dialing code: 0964
- Website: Official website

Agnana Calabra is a comune (municipality) in the Metropolitan City of Reggio Calabria in the Italian region Calabria, located about 70 kilometres (43 mi) southwest of Catanzaro and about 50 kilometres (31 mi) northeast of Reggio Calabria.

Agnana Calabra borders the following municipalities: Canolo, Gerace, Mammola, Siderno.
