= Giffone =

Giffone Griko: Kasàli
- Comune
- Comune di Giffone
- Location within Italy Location within Calabria
- Coordinates: 38°26′N 16°9′E
- Country: Italy
- Region: Calabria
- Metropolitan city: Reggio Calabria (RC)

Area
  - Total: 14.5 km^{2} (5.6 sq mi)

Population (Dec. 2004)
  - Total: 2,154
  - Density: 149/km^{2} (385/sq mi)
- Time zone: UTC+1 (CET)
  - Summer (DST): UTC+2 (CEST)
- Postal code: 89020
- Dialing code: 0966

Giffone (Calabrian: Giffùni or Casàli) is a comune (municipality) in the Province of Reggio Calabria in the Italian region Calabria, located about 60 kilometres (37 mi) southwest of Catanzaro and about 60 kilometres (37 mi) northeast of Reggio Calabria. As of 31 December 2004, it had a population of 2,154 and an area of 14.5 square kilometres (5.6 mi^{2}).

== Geography ==
Giffone borders the following municipalities: Anoia, Cinquefrondi, Galatro, Mammola, Maropati.

== Demographic evolution ==
Historical population

Year	Pop.	±%
1861	2,573	—
1871	2,826	+9.8%
1881	2,904	+2.8%
1901	3,142	+8.2%
1911	3,244	+3.2%

Year	Pop.	±%
1921	3,273	+0.9%
1931	3,617	+10.5%
1936	3,898	+7.8%
1951	4,434	+13.8%
1961	4,104	−7.4%

Year	Pop.	±%
1971	3,099	−24.5%
1981	2,646	−14.6%
1991	2,420	−8.5%
2001	2,182	−9.8%

Source: Data from ISTAT
