= Canolo =

Canolo Greek: Canàlo
- Comune
- Comune di Canolo
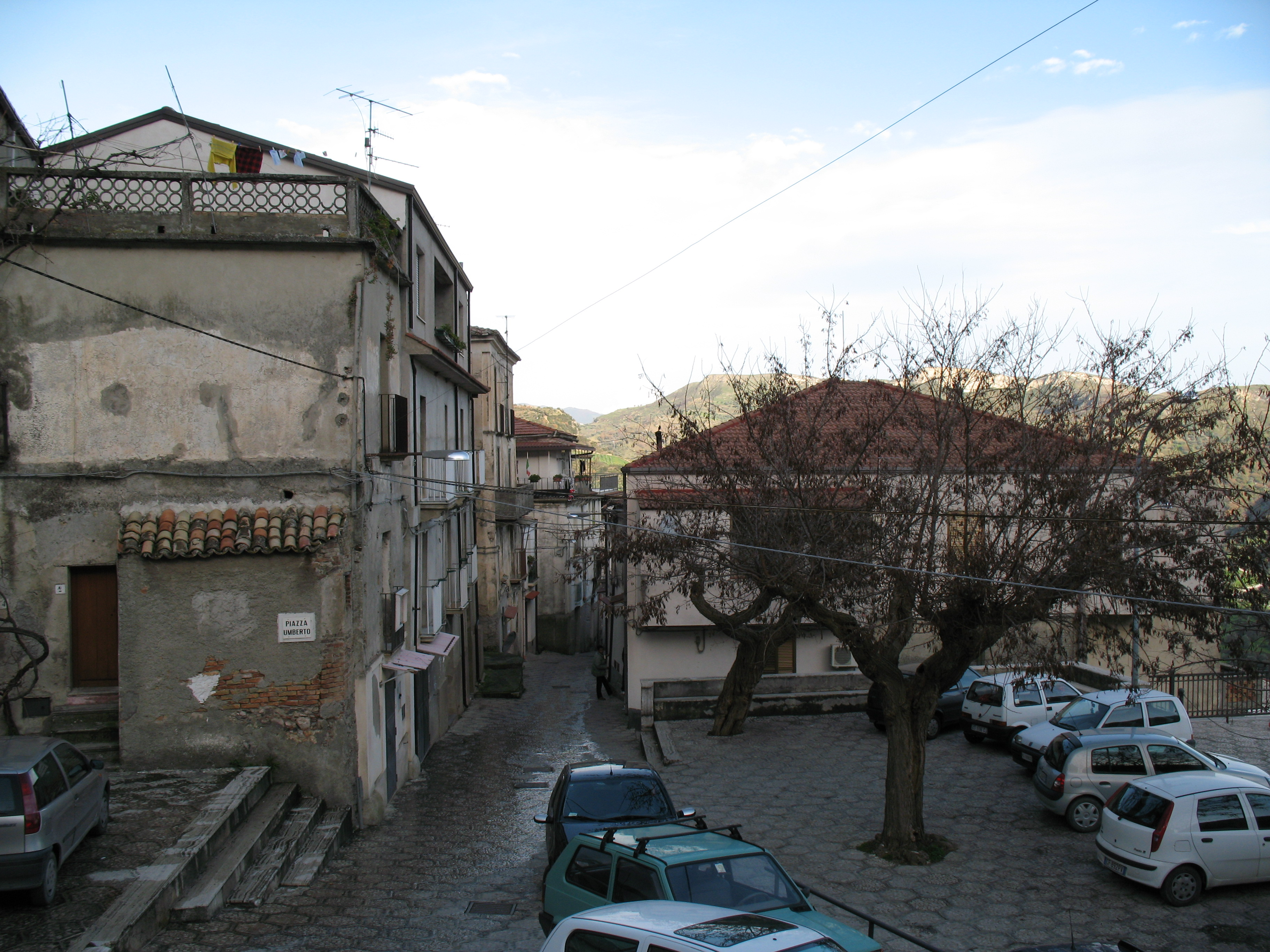

- Location within Italy Location within Calabria
- Coordinates: 38°19′N 16°12′E
- Country: Italy
- Region: Calabria
- Metropolitan city: Reggio Calabria (RC)

Government
  - Mayor: None (commune disbanded for Mafia allegiance)

Area
  - Total: 28.2 km^{2} (10.9 sq mi)
- Elevation: 432 m (1,417 ft)

Population (30 April 2017)
  - Total: 714
  - Density: 25.3/km^{2} (65.6/sq mi)
- Demonym: Canolesi
- Time zone: UTC+1 (CET)
  - Summer (DST): UTC+2 (CEST)
- Postal code: 89040
- Dialing code: 0964
- Patron saint: St. Nicholas of Bari
- Saint day: 6 December
- Website: Official website

Canolo is a comune (municipality) in the Metropolitan City of Reggio Calabria in the Italian region Calabria, located about 70 kilometres (43 mi) southwest of Catanzaro and about 50 kilometres (31 mi) northeast of Reggio Calabria. As of 31 December 2004, it had a population of 901 and an area of 28.2 square kilometres (10.9 mi^{2}).

Canolo borders the following municipalities: Agnana Calabra, Cittanova, Gerace, Mammola, San Giorgio Morgeto.

== History ==
Canolo was believed to be founded in the Byzantine Era by survivors of an attack on Gerace in 952 by the Arabs, but is believed to have been populated long before them after human remains and tools dating as far back as the Neolithic period have been found in the area. During the Bourbon period, surrounding mountains were mined for their deposits of lignite, antimony, barium, and chalk.
