= Galatro =

Galatro Greek: Γαλοτυριον, romanized: Galotyrion
- Comune
- Comune di Galatro
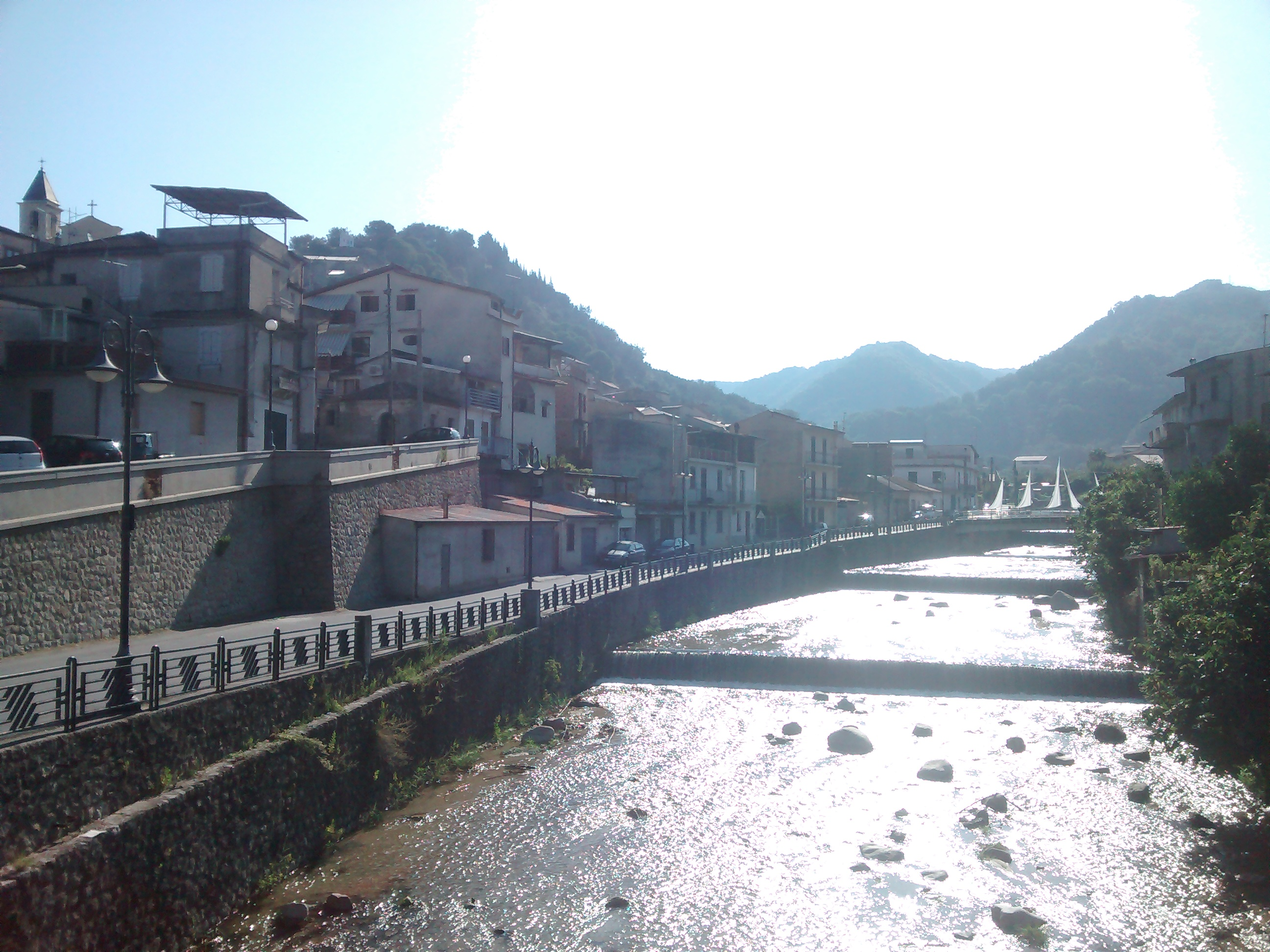

- Location within Italy Location within Calabria
- Coordinates: 38°28′N 16°7′E
- Country: Italy
- Region: Calabria
- Metropolitan city: Reggio Calabria (RC)

Area
  - Total: 50.5 km^{2} (19.5 sq mi)

Population (Dec. 2004)
  - Total: 2,077
  - Density: 41.1/km^{2} (107/sq mi)
- Demonym: Galatresi
- Time zone: UTC+1 (CET)
  - Summer (DST): UTC+2 (CEST)
- Postal code: 89054
- Dialing code: 0966

Galatro (Greek: Γαλοτυριον, romanized: Galotyrion) is a comune (municipality) in the Province of Reggio Calabria in the Italian region Calabria, located about 60 kilometres (37 mi) southwest of Catanzaro and about 60 kilometres (37 mi) northeast of Reggio Calabria. As of 31 December 2004 it had a population of 2,077 and an area of 50.5 square kilometres (19.5 mi^{2}).

It borders the municipalities of Fabrizia, Feroleto della Chiesa, Giffone, Grotteria, Laureana di Borrello, Mammola, Maropati, and San Pietro di Caridà.

== Demographic evolution ==
Historical population

Year	Pop.	±%
1861	1,858	—
1871	1,937	+4.3%
1881	1,888	−2.5%
1901	2,483	+31.5%
1911	2,822	+13.7%

Year	Pop.	±%
1921	3,183	+12.8%
1931	3,261	+2.5%
1936	3,482	+6.8%
1951	3,782	+8.6%
1961	3,192	−15.6%

Year	Pop.	±%
1971	3,120	−2.3%
1981	3,059	−2.0%
1991	3,032	−0.9%
2001	2,307	−23.9%

Source: Data from ISTAT
