= Polistena =

Polistena Πολυξένη (Greek)
- Comune
- Comune di Polistena
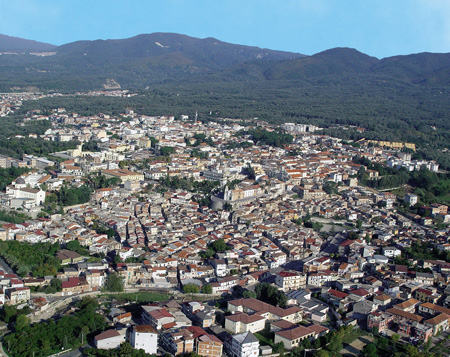

- Location within Italy Location within Calabria
- Coordinates: 38°24′N 16°4′E
- Country: Italy
- Region: Calabria
- Metropolitan city: Reggio Calabria (RC)
- Frazioni: Primogenito

Government
  - Mayor: Michele Tripodi (PdCI)

Area
  - Total: 11.77 km^{2} (4.54 sq mi)
- Elevation: 254 m (833 ft)

Population (31 March 2018)
  - Total: 10,367
  - Density: 880.8/km^{2} (2,281/sq mi)
- Demonym: Polistenesi
- Time zone: UTC+1 (CET)
  - Summer (DST): UTC+2 (CEST)
- Postal code: 89024
- Dialing code: 0966
- Patron saint: Santa Marina Vergine
- Saint day: July 17
- Website: Official website

Polistena (Calabrian Greek: Πολυξένη, romanized: Polyxénē, or Πολυσθένη Polysthénē) is a comune (municipality) in the Metropolitan City of Reggio Calabria in the Italian region Calabria, located about 70 kilometres (43 mi) southwest of Catanzaro and about 50 kilometres (31 mi) northeast of Reggio Calabria.

Polistena borders the following municipalities: Anoia, Cinquefrondi, Cittanova, Melicucco, San Giorgio Morgeto.

== History ==
Of uncertain historical origins, the territory around Polistena has been inhabited since prehistoric times. From the remains found, it appears to be the territory of transit of the Locresi during their ancestral migration. A village with the modern name is mentioned for the first time in the 13th century AD.

In 1783 Polistena was devastated by a violent earthquake, that razed to the ground most of the city and killed more than 2,000 people. The city was rebuilt quickly, basing on a design by Neapolitan architect Pompeo Schiantarelli, creating an urban center in the upper part of the city.

== Main sights ==
The Monument to the Fallen (Monumento ai Caduti) is located in Piazza del Popolo, and was sculpted by Francesco Jerace. The Palazzo Avati is located in the same square. In its facade is a portal where there is an apotropaic mark.

== Twin towns — sister cities ==
Polistena is twinned with:

- Anzola dell'Emilia, Italy

== People ==
- Fra' Girolamo Marafioti
- Francesco Jerace
- Ferdinando Adornato
- Mimmo Calopresti
- Franco Anile
- Franco Macri
