= Metropolitan City of Reggio Calabria =

Metropolitan City of Reggio Calabria Città metropolitana di Reggio Calabria (Italian)
- Metropolitan City
- Flag Coat of arms

- Location of the Metropolitan City of Reggio Calabria in Italy
- Coordinates: 38.1114°N 15.6619°E
- Country: Italy
- Region: Calabria
- Established: 1 January 2017
- Capital(s): Reggio Calabria
- Municipalities: 97

Government
  - Metropolitan mayor: Francesco Cannizzaro

Area
  - Total: 3,210.37 km^{2} (1,239.53 sq mi)

Population (2026)
  - Total: 510,590
  - Density: 159.04/km^{2} (411.92/sq mi)

GDP
  - Total: €9.901 billion (2015)
  - Per capita: €17,778 (2015)
- Time zone: UTC+1 (CET)
  - Summer (DST): UTC+2 (CEST)
- Postal code: 89121–89135 (Reggio Calabria); 89010-89018, 89020-89036, 89039-89050, 89052, 89054, 89056-89058, 89060, 89063-89065, 89069 (other municipalities)
- Telephone prefix: 0964, 0965, 0966
- ISO 3166 code: IT-RC
- Vehicle registration: RC
- ISTAT code: 280
- Website: www.cittametropolitana.rc.it

The Metropolitan City of Reggio Calabria (Italian: Città metropolitana di Reggio Calabria) is a metropolitan city in the region of Calabria in southern Italy. Its capital is the city of Reggio Calabria. It has a population of 510,590 in an area of 3,210.37 square kilometres (1,239.53 sq mi) across its 97 municipalities. It replaced the province of Reggio Calabria in 2017.

Comprising the "toe" of the boot-shaped Italian Peninsula, the Aspromonte massif dominates the western part of the metropolitan city's territory: with its long coastline, it is a popular tourist destination during the summer.

== History ==
The Metropolitan City was created by the reform of local authorities (Law 142/1990), and then established by the Law 56/2014.

== Government ==
The Metropolitan City is headed by the Metropolitan Mayor (sindaco metropolitano) and the Metropolitan Council (consiglio metropolitano).

=== List of metropolitan mayors ===
	Metropolitan Mayor	Term start	Term end	Party
1	Giuseppe Falcomatà	2 February 2017	10 January 2026	Democratic Party
2	Francesco Cannizzaro	4 June 2026	Incumbent	Forza Italia

=== Municipalities ===
The metropolitan city has 97 municipalities:

- Africo
- Agnana Calabra
- Anoia
- Antonimina
- Ardore
- Bagaladi
- Bagnara Calabra
- Benestare
- Bianco
- Bivongi
- Bova
- Bova Marina
- Bovalino
- Brancaleone
- Bruzzano Zeffirio
- Calanna
- Camini
- Campo Calabro
- Candidoni
- Canolo
- Caraffa del Bianco
- Cardeto
- Careri
- Casignana
- Caulonia
- Ciminà
- Cinquefrondi
- Cittanova
- Condofuri
- Cosoleto
- Delianuova
- Feroleto della Chiesa
- Ferruzzano
- Fiumara
- Galatro
- Gerace
- Giffone
- Gioia Tauro
- Gioiosa Ionica
- Grotteria
- Laganadi
- Laureana di Borrello
- Locri
- Mammola
- Marina di Gioiosa Ionica
- Maropati
- Martone
- Melicuccà
- Melicucco
- Melito di Porto Salvo
- Molochio
- Monasterace
- Montebello Ionico
- Motta San Giovanni
- Oppido Mamertina
- Palizzi
- Palmi
- Pazzano
- Placanica
- Platì
- Polistena
- Portigliola
- Reggio di Calabria
- Riace
- Rizziconi
- Roccaforte del Greco
- Roccella Ionica
- Roghudi
- Rosarno
- Samo
- San Ferdinando
- San Giorgio Morgeto
- San Giovanni di Gerace
- San Lorenzo
- San Luca
- San Pietro di Caridà
- San Procopio
- San Roberto
- Sant'Agata del Bianco
- Sant'Alessio in Aspromonte
- Sant'Eufemia d'Aspromonte
- Sant'Ilario dello Ionio
- Santa Cristina d'Aspromonte
- Santo Stefano in Aspromonte
- Scido
- Scilla
- Seminara
- Serrata
- Siderno
- Sinopoli
- Staiti
- Stignano
- Stilo
- Taurianova
- Terranova Sappo Minulio
- Varapodio
- Villa San Giovanni

== Demographics ==
As of 2026, the population is 510,590, of which 48.8% are male, and 51.2% are female. Minors make up 15.8% of the population, and seniors make up 24.6%.

Historical population

Year	Pop.	±%
1861	323,862	—
1871	354,332	+9.4%
1881	375,528	+6.0%
1901	437,209	+16.4%
1911	470,400	+7.6%
1921	525,304	+11.7%
1931	565,518	+7.7%
1936	578,262	+2.3%

Year	Pop.	±%
1951	639,471	+10.6%
1961	609,140	−4.7%
1971	578,323	−5.1%
1981	573,093	−0.9%
1991	576,693	+0.6%
2001	564,223	−2.2%
2011	550,967	−2.3%
2021	522,127	−5.2%

Source: ISTAT

=== Immigration ===
As of 2025, immigrants make up 7.6% of the population. The 5 largest foreign countries of birth are Romania, Morocco, India, Ukraine, and Argentina.

== See also ==
- Province of Reggio Calabria
