= Anoia, Calabria =

Anoia Anòyia (Greek)
- Comune
- Comune di Anoia
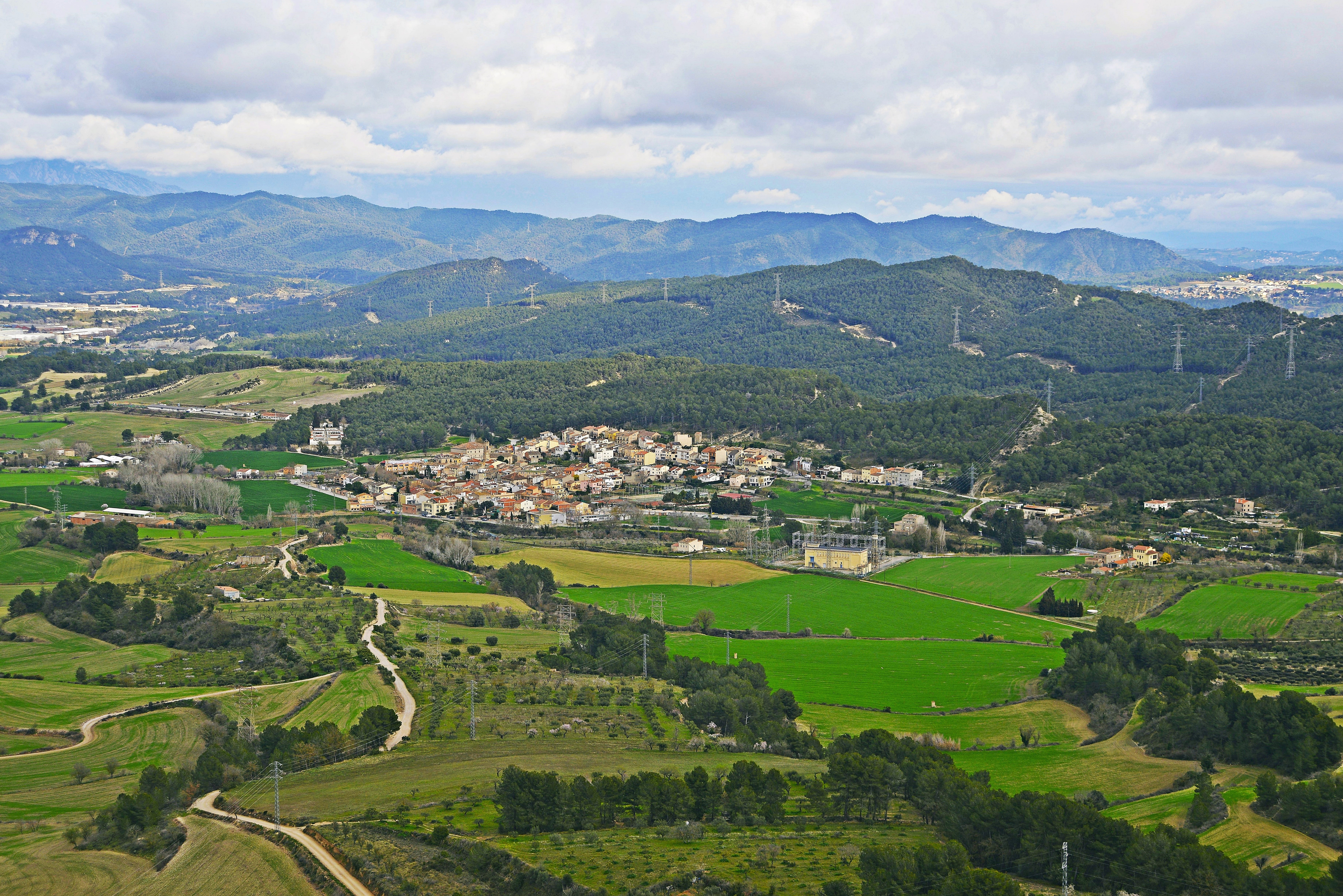
- View of Anoia

- Location within Italy Location within Calabria
- Coordinates: 38°26′N 16°05′E
- Country: Italy
- Region: Calabria
- Metropolitan city: Reggio Calabria (RC)
- Frazioni: Anoia Superiore, Anoia Inferiore

Government
  - Mayor: Alessandro Demarzo

Area
  - Total: 10.17 km^{2} (3.93 sq mi)
- Elevation: 210 m (690 ft)

Population (1 January 2017)
  - Total: 2,179
  - Density: 214.3/km^{2} (554.9/sq mi)
- Demonyms: Sanoiesi, Anoiani
- Time zone: UTC+1 (CET)
  - Summer (DST): UTC+2 (CEST)
- Postal code: 89020
- Dialing code: 0966
- Patron saint: St. Nicholas, St. Sebastian
- Saint day: December 6, January 20
- Website: Official website

Anoia (Calabrian: Anòi) is a comune in the Metropolitan City of Reggio Calabria, Calabria (southern Italy) It is bordered by Melicucco and Primogenito to the southwest, Maropati to the northeast and Cinquefrondi to the southeast. Anoia is formed by two separate settlements, the frazioni of Anoia Inferiore and Anoi Superiore, the latter located about c. 800 m to the southeast of the other along the SS536 road between Cinquefrondi and Maropati.
