= Benestare =

- Comune
- Comune di Benestare
- Coat of arms

- Location within Italy Location within Calabria
- Coordinates: 38°11′N 16°8′E
- Country: Italy
- Region: Calabria
- Metropolitan city: Reggio Calabria (RC)
- Frazioni: Ammendolare, Ancone Greek: Angon, Armerà, Belloro, Bosco, Bruca, Canale, Collura, Drafà, Esopo Greek: Aesopos, Fego, Gistratico Greek: Geostratiko, Ientile, Martilli, Meta, Nasida Greek: Nesida, Palmieri, Pignatarco, Piraino, Ricciolio, Rodia Greek: Rhodià, Russellina, S.Giovanni, Scarparina, Schianata, Varraro, Zopà

Government
  - Mayor: Domenico Mantegna

Area
  - Total: 18.6 km^{2} (7.2 sq mi)
- Elevation: 250 m (820 ft)

Population (2007)
  - Total: 2,521
  - Density: 136/km^{2} (351/sq mi)
- Demonym: Benestaresi
- Time zone: UTC+1 (CET)
  - Summer (DST): UTC+2 (CEST)
- Postal code: 89030
- Dialing code: 0964
- Website: Official website

Benestare is a comune (municipality) in the Province of Reggio Calabria in the Italian region Calabria, located about 90 kilometres (56 mi) southwest of Catanzaro and about 40 kilometres (25 mi) east of Reggio Calabria.
