= Province of Reggio Calabria =

Former province of Calabria, Italy

Coordinates: 38°06′41″N 15°39′43″E

- Province (1817–2017)
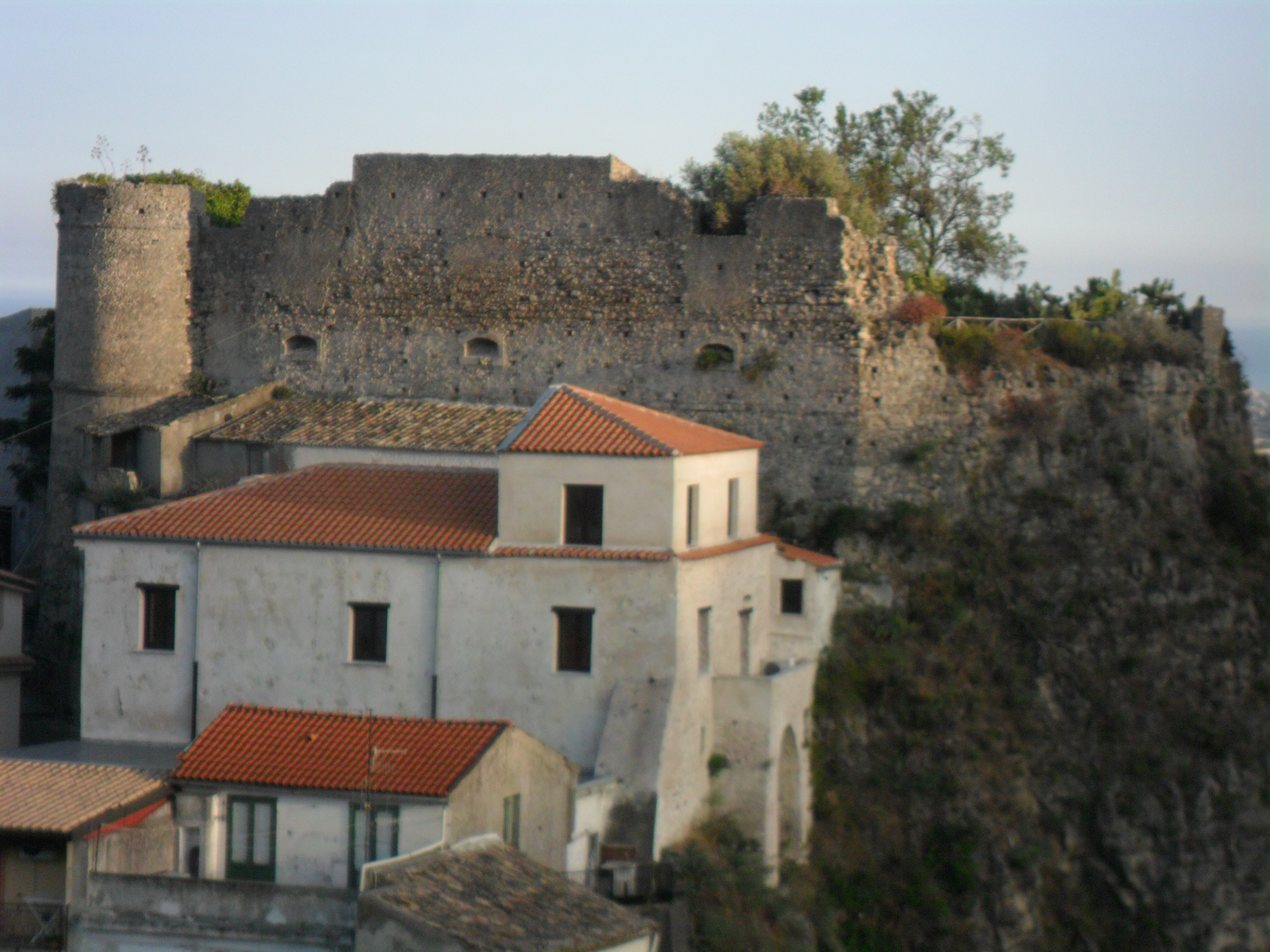
- Castle and theatre of Gioiosa Ionica

- Flag Coat of arms

- Map highlighting the location of the province of Reggio Calabria in Italy
- Country: Italy
- Region: Calabria
- Capital(s): Reggio di Calabria
- Comuni: 97

Area
  - Total: 3,183 km^{2} (1,229 sq mi)

Population (28 February 2014)
  - Total: 559,675
  - Density: 175.8/km^{2} (455.4/sq mi)
- Time zone: UTC+1 (CET)
  - Summer (DST): UTC+2 (CEST)
- Postal code: 89010-89018, 89020-89036, 89039-89050, 89052, 89054, 89056-89058, 89060, 89063-89065, 89069
- Telephone prefix: 0964, 0965, 0966
- Vehicle registration: RC
- ISTAT: 080

The province of Reggio Calabria (Italian: provincia di Reggio Calabria) was a province in the Calabria region of Italy. It was the southernmost province in mainland Italy and is separated from the island of Sicily by the Strait of Messina. The capital was the city of Reggio.

It was effectively replaced by the Metropolitan City of Reggio Calabria in 2017.

== Geography ==
The province of Reggio Calabria was located at the extreme southern tip of mainland Italy. To the west lies the Tyrrhenian Sea and to the south and southeast lies the Ionian Sea. The land borders are short; to the northeast lies the province of Catanzaro and to the northwest, the province of Vibo Valentia. Across the Strait of Messina, some 3 kilometres (1.9 mi) to the southwest, lies the island of Sicily.

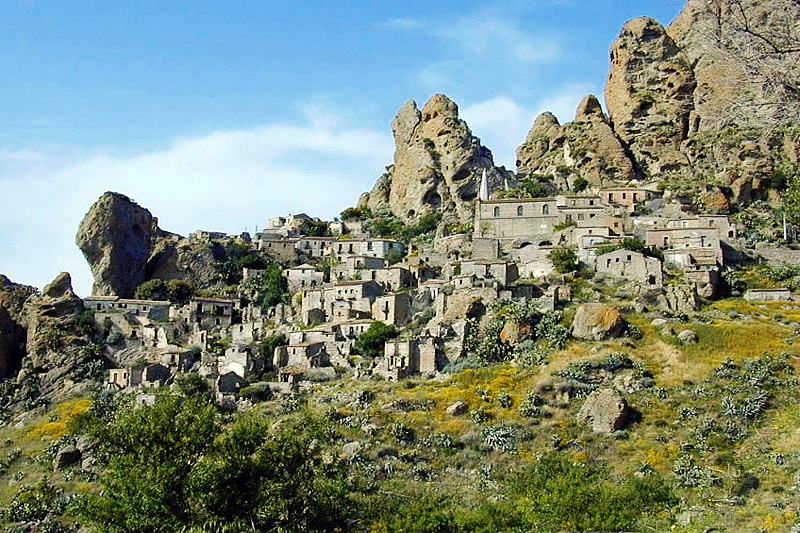
A village on the Aspromonte massif.

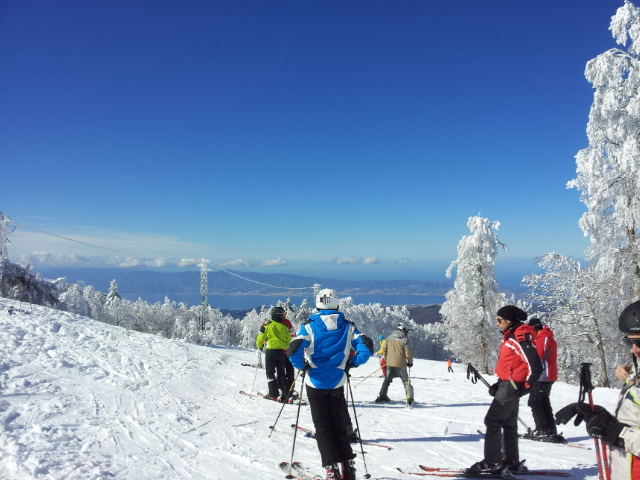
the skiresort of Gambarie over the Strait of Messina is very close to the sea

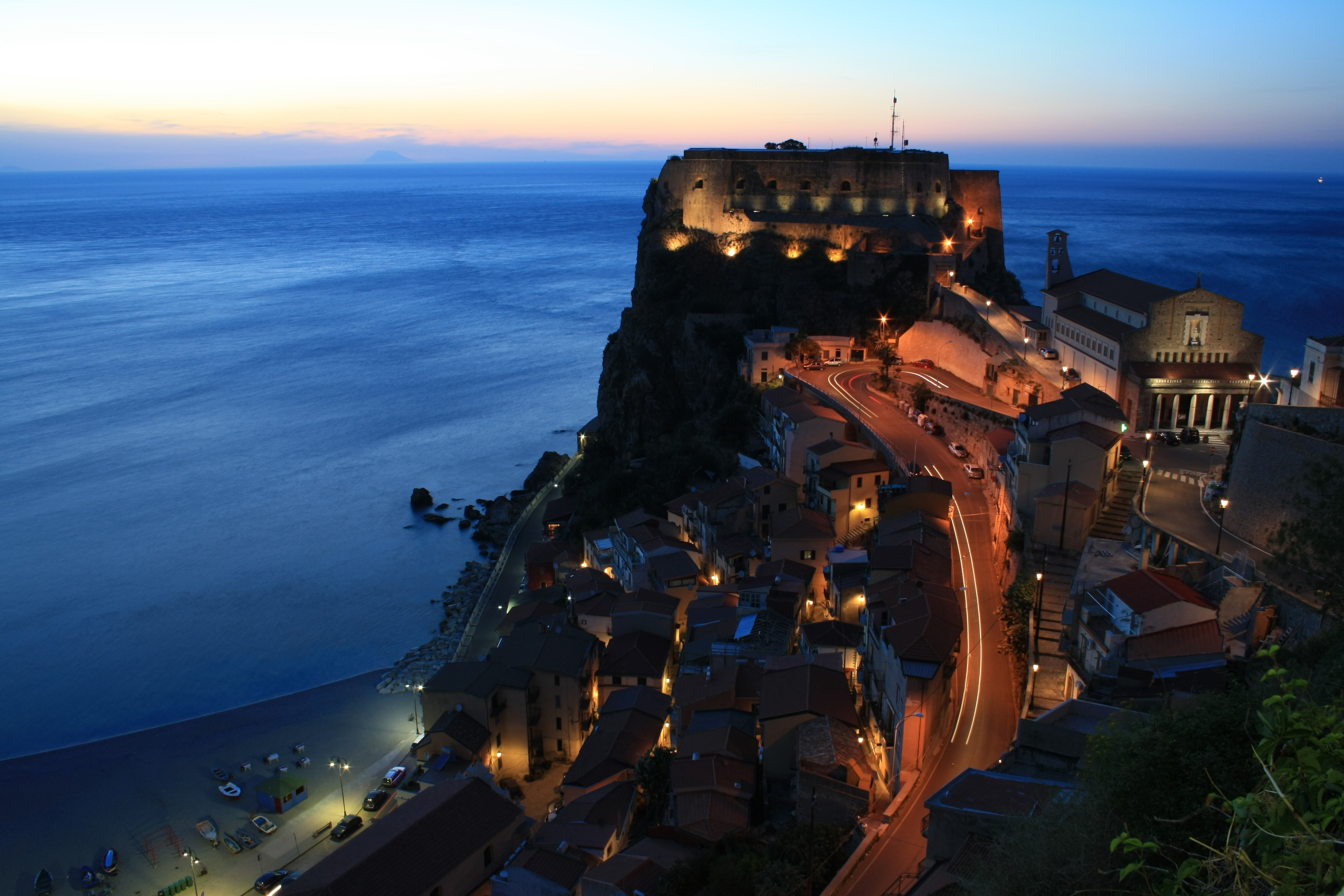
Scilla and its castle.

The province can be divided into three types of terrain. Near the west, it is mountainous, with the Aspromonte massif being formed of overlapping terraces of gneiss and mica schists. The highest point is 1,956 m (6,417 ft) and this area is part of the Aspromonte National Park. From the mountains flow many, often seasonal, creeks and rivers, the largest being the Amendolea and the Calopinace. The lower hills are terraced for the cultivation of citrus fruits, olives, and vines, and the higher parts are wooded, with chestnuts, beeches, holm oaks, pines, Sicilian firs, and Mediterranean maquis shrubland. The southern part of the province has a coastal plain and to the east of the mountainous area, there is a plateau that extends from the Tyrrhenian Sea to the Ionian Sea, the distance from Rosarno to Punta Stilo being about 220 kilometres (140 mi).

== History ==
The present-day southern part of Calabria was the place where the name "Italy" was first used, some 3500 years ago.

The Ancient Greeks built a town "Rhegion" at the site of present-day Reggio, a strategic site beside the Strait of Messina. The town's Museo Nazionale houses two bronze statues, the Riace bronzes, recovered from the sea at Riace some 50 miles (80 km) to the east.

By the third century BC, the Greeks were conquered by tribes from the north, including a branch of the Samnites called the Bruttii. They established their sovereignty over present day Calabria and founded new cities, including their own capital "Consentia", now known as Cosenza. After their victory in the Pyrrhic War (280–275 BC), Rome occupied Calabria, and it remained under their control until the fifth century AD.

The whole region of present-day Reggio province has been a wealthy area for centuries, and particularly during Byzantine age, till 1860s, when the Italian Unification happened.

The town of Reggio and other parts of the province, as well as Messina and neighbouring parts of Sicily, were devastated by the 1908 Messina earthquake. This was followed by a series of tsunamis that wreaked further damage.

In the 1950s there was a mass migration of rural people from Reggio and other provinces in southern Italy to the cities of Rome, Milan and particularly Turin in the north. They were driven by poverty, the poor soils of the region and the chronic lack of employment opportunities to move to places with more thriving economies.

Between 1969 and 1973, southern Italy suffered from urban unrest due to the lack of employment possibilities and poor living conditions, and urban protest took place. In 1970, Catanzaro was chosen as the location for a new regional government. Reggio was then the scene of a popular uprising - known as the Moti di Reggio - against the government choice of Catanzaro as capital of the newly instituted Region of Calabria. Strikes and demonstrations occurred and went on for more than a year, and were sometimes put down brutally by the police and the army. The railway service from Sicily was disrupted, the airport, post offices and TV station were occupied at different times, and police stations were assaulted. Three people were killed, more than two hundred wounded and over four hundred were charged with public-order offences.

The Italian government responded to this by confirming Catanzaro as the regional capital but arranging for the regional assembly to be held at Reggio. A new port and steel works were announced at Gioia Tauro, to create employment in the area, but before the steel works was completed, the price of steel collapsed and the steel works were abandoned. The port however was built, but another project, a new power station, did not go ahead because of environmental factors. The port has since become a busy container terminal handling more than three million shipping containers each year, and new roads have been built to handle the resulting increase in traffic.

== Economy ==
The region is famous for the production of the Bergamot orange. Production mostly is limited to the Ionian coastal region of the province of Calabria in Italy, to such an extent that it is a symbol of the entire region. Clementines are cultivated in the fertile area of Piana di Gioia Tauro. This area is also used for the cultivation of other citrus fruits and olive trees, and much of the local economy is involved in olive oil extraction and the processing of citrus products.

== See also ==
- Metropolitan City of Reggio Calabria
- Calabrian wine
