= Ruffo di Calabria =

Italian noble family

House of Ruffo di Calabria
- Country: Kingdom of Naples; Kingdom of the Two Sicilies; Kingdom of Italy; Italy
- Founded: 10th century (origin); 1578 (princely title)
- Founder: Pietro I, Count of Catanzaro; Fabrizio (VIII Count of Sinopoli, I Prince of Scilla)
- Titles: List: Cardinal (non-hereditary); Queen consort of the Belgians; Prince of Calabria; Prince of Scilla; Prince of Palazzolo; Prince of Scaletta; Prince of Castelcicala; Prince of Floresta; Prince of Sant'Antimo; Prince of Fiumara; Prince of Motta San Giovanni; Duke of San Martino; Duke of Guardia Lombardi; Duke of Bagnara; Duke of Baranello; Duke of Santa Cristina; Marquis of Licodia; Marquis of Panaghia; Marquis of Crotone; Marquis of Guardia; Marquis of Courbons; Marquis of Lafare; Count of Sinopoli; Count of Nicotera; Count of Catanzaro; Count of Mesoraca; Count of Montalto and Corigliano; Count of Laric; Baron of Calanna and Crispano; Baron of Guidomandri; Baron of Monaco; Baron of Luponaro; Baron of San Giorgio; Baron of Cucco; Baron of Randé; Baron of Castellana; Baron of Fegotto; Baron of San Lucido; Baron of Castelcicada; Baron of Oze; Lord of Giampilieri; Lord of Molino; Lord of Altolia; Lord of Beauvezet; Lord of Bonneval; Lord of Lamanon and Aurons; Neapolitan Patrician; Messinese Patrician; Grandee of Spain, first class
- Motto: Omnia bene ("Everything is good")
- Cadet branches: Ruffo di Catanzaro; Ruffo di Montalto; Ruffo di Sinopoli; Ruffo di Bagnaro (extinct); Ruffo della Scaletta; Ruffo di Castelcicada (extinct); Ruffo de Laric (or de La Ric) (extinct); Roux de Lemanon; Roux de Beauvezet (extinct); Ruffo de Bonneval de La Fare

The Ruffo di Calabria are one of the oldest and most illustrious families of the Italian nobility, already counted among the seven greatest noble houses of the Kingdom of Naples.

== Origins ==
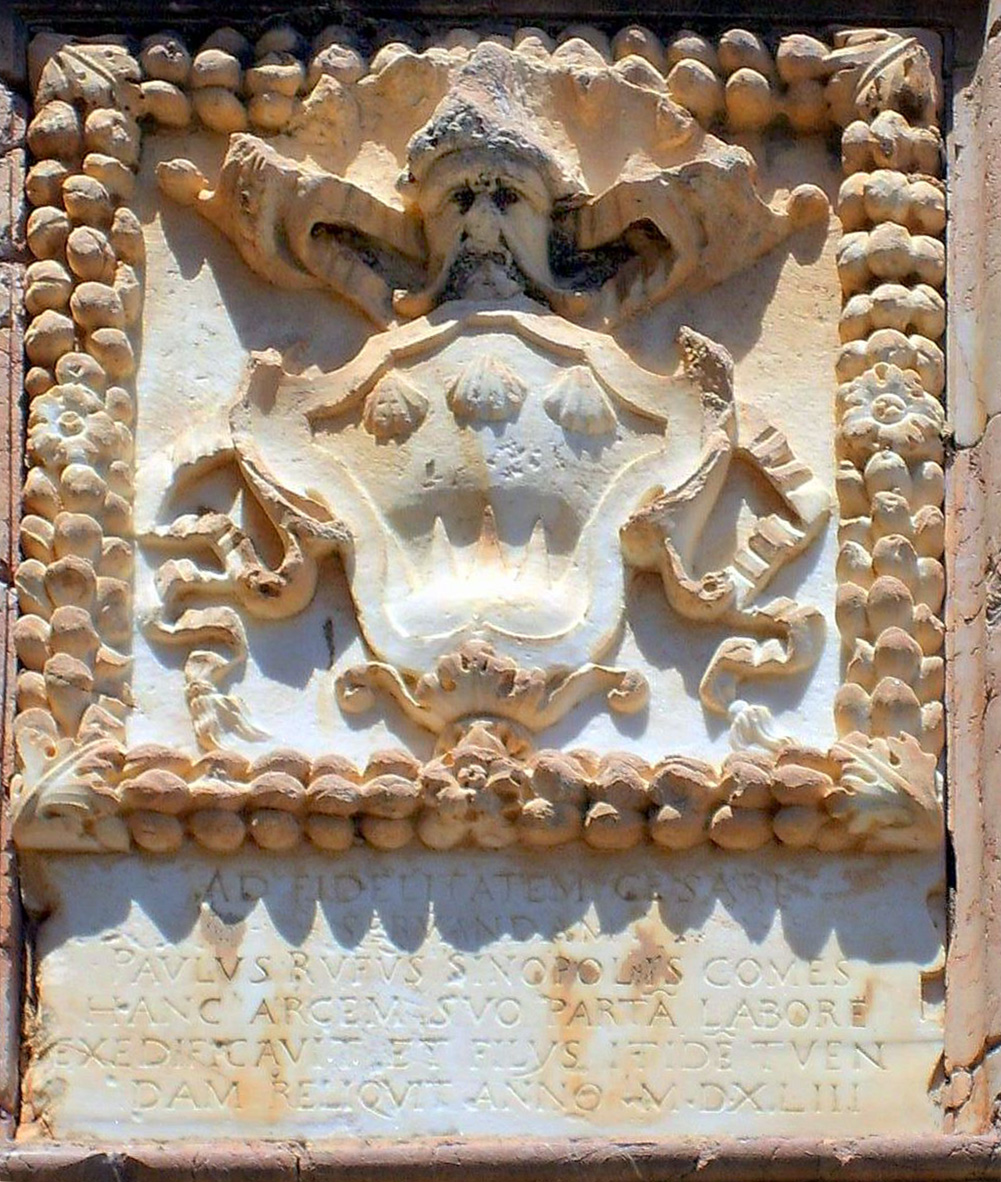
Stone version of the Ruffo di Calabria coat of arms at castello Ruffo di Scilla (Reggio Calabria) Motto: Omnia bene. Blazon: Troncato, cuneato d'argento e di nero, il capo caricato di tre conchiglie al naturale

The antiquity of the origins of the Magna Domus of the Ruffo di Calabria has long been the subject of hagiographical and genealogical writings. In the second half of the 13th century, Simone da Lentini, Bishop of Syracuse, wrote: "Rufa nobilissima et vetustissima familia, tempore romanae reipublicae magnopere vixit et usque ad meum tempus potentissime vivit", testifying to the family's prestige and longevity.

In the 17th century, Giovanni Fiore wrote in greater detail: "The Ruffo di Calabria are attributed with remote origins, as if their name derived from the Latin Rufo. Chroniclers reported that the Ruffo and the Giuliani were lords of vast territories, so much so that around the year 1000 'the Emperor of Constantinople, having allied himself with them, reconquered Apulia and Calabria'. Others consider them of Norman origin: Filippo and Errigo Ruffo, in the service of Robert Guiscard, occupied Terra d'Otranto and Basilicata."

Historical sources unanimously attest that the Ruffo were already flourishing in Calabria before the year 1000. As for the alleged Roman origin and the fanciful genealogical reconstructions proposed, these can only be read as a sort of founding myth — a politically legitimising legend in whose construction the family, taking great pride in it over the following centuries, can hardly have been entirely uninvolved. Less implausible, as will be seen, is the hypothesis of a Byzantine origin, for which, however, the same considerations expressed for the Roman one apply; the hypothesis of a Norman origin, though still conjectural, appears to be the most plausible.

=== Roman hypothesis ===
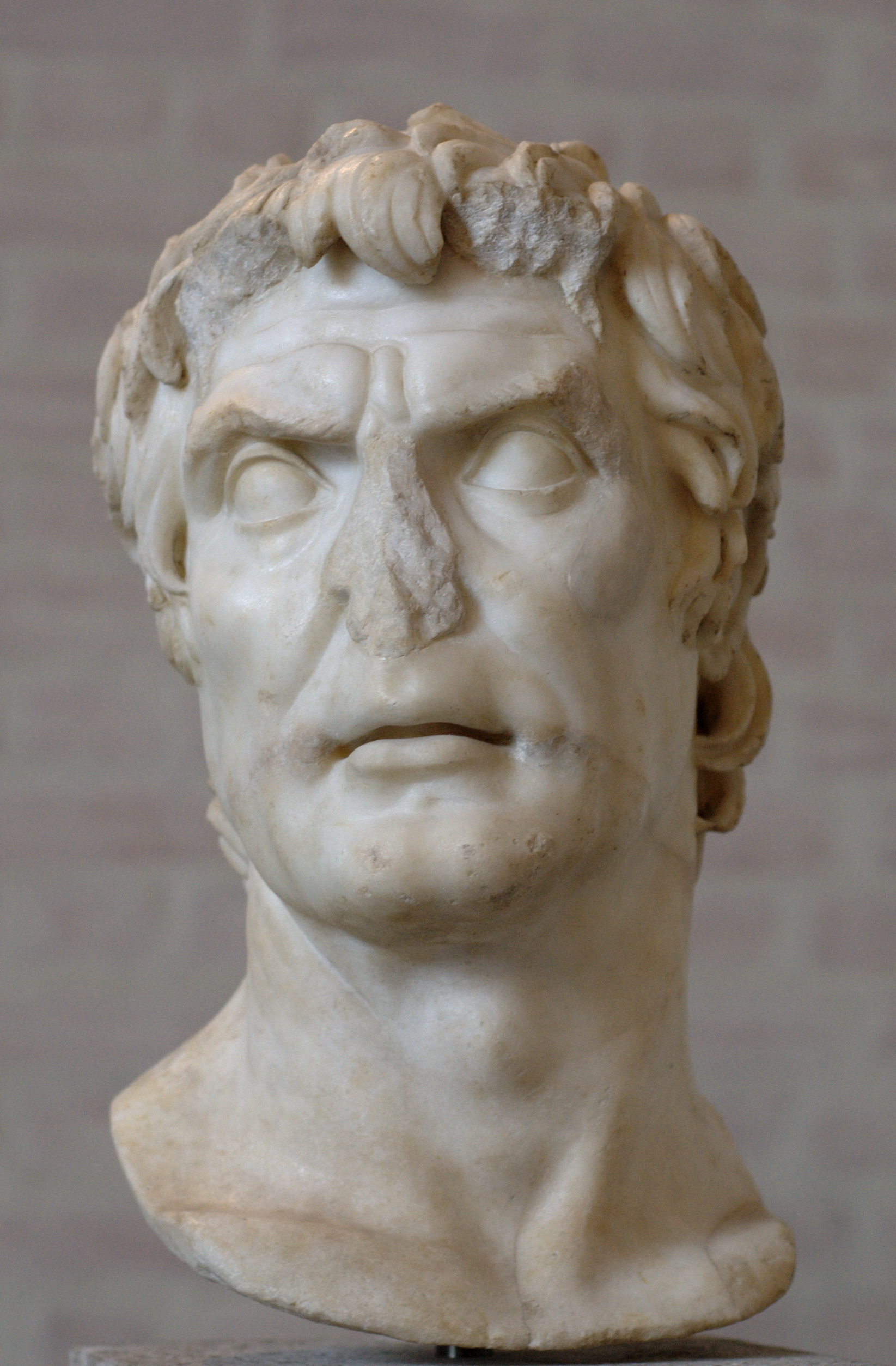
Bust of Lucius Cornelius Sulla.

According to this colourful but largely fanciful hypothesis, based solely on the similarity of names, the Ruffo were said to descend from the Gens Cornelia, and in particular from its consular branch, the Rufi. This line claimed kinship with Sulla, tracing its eponymous ancestor to a Cornelius Rufus who, according to the Sibylline Books, proposed the institution of the ludi apollinares.

An obscure figure referred to as "Tamusio Tinga" even claimed that the family originated from Ascanio Silvio, son of Aeneas, through his third son Rufus.

This supposed connection, along with the family's veneration of Saint Rufus of Capua — a 1st-century martyr and third bishop of Capua — cannot be regarded as evidence of Roman origins or of an early conversion to Christianity.

=== Byzantine hypothesis ===
Like the previous one, this genealogical hypothesis is not supported by historical documentation and can be considered nothing more than a family vulgata. However, the presence at the imperial court of Byzantium of prominent figures — consuls and generals — bearing the surname Rufus is historically attested. Early hagiographers of the Ruffo family, though not particularly reliable, listed among their supposed ancestors:

- Marcus Antonius Rufus I (4th century), probably converted to Christianity, a general of Constantius Chlorus who fought alongside Constantine the Great against Maxentius at the Battle of the Milvian Bridge. In gratitude, Constantine was said to have made his family one of the most prominent in the newly refounded Constantinople.
- Lucius Rufus (son of the above, 4th century), an officer under Constantine II who died around 340 during the unsuccessful campaign against Constans.
- Lucius Antonius Rufus (5th century), a general of Valentinian III who fought against the Vandals under Genseric; the Roman army he possibly commanded was defeated in 431.
- Marcus Antonius Rufus II (late 7th century), a general who distinguished himself in Macedonia. Loyal to Emperor Justinian II, he was removed from office by the usurper Leontios and subsequently assassinated around 695.

According to family tradition, over the centuries the Ruffo became connected to the Byzantine imperial dynasties of the Heraclian, Isaurian, and Macedonian houses, which are said to have entrusted them with the governance of Calabria.

=== Norman hypothesis ===
This is generally considered the most plausible theory. Individuals bearing the surname Ruffus or Rufus are documented in the 11th and 12th centuries — the same period in which the Ruffo are first historically attested in Calabria — in England, Sicily, and southern Italy.

It should be noted, however, that this theory could coexist with the previous one, allowing for a possible Norman–Byzantine origin of the family, as Varangian and Norman mercenaries were present in Constantinople as early as the 9th century.

=== Historical attestation ===
The earliest historical records of the Ruffo di Calabria date back to around the year 1000. In the Chronica Monasterii Casinensis by Leo of Ostia there is mention of the previously noted alliance between the Byzantine emperor and the Ruffo and Giuliani families to recover Calabria and Apulia for the Byzantines.

About a century later, a Pietro Ruffo — said to have been born in 1118 — was created cardinal by Pope Gelasius II. In 1125, a Gervasio Ruffo was appointed strategoto of Messina and, in 1146, was elevated by Roger II of Sicily to the rank of lord of Mizzillicar and Chabucas.

A probable descendant, named Ruggero de Gervasio, was appointed vallectus camerae by Frederick II in 1223. Around the same time, a Serio Ruffo, Grand Marshal of the kingdom, is recorded as having taken part in the escort of the emperor's body to Taranto.

== Cadet branches ==
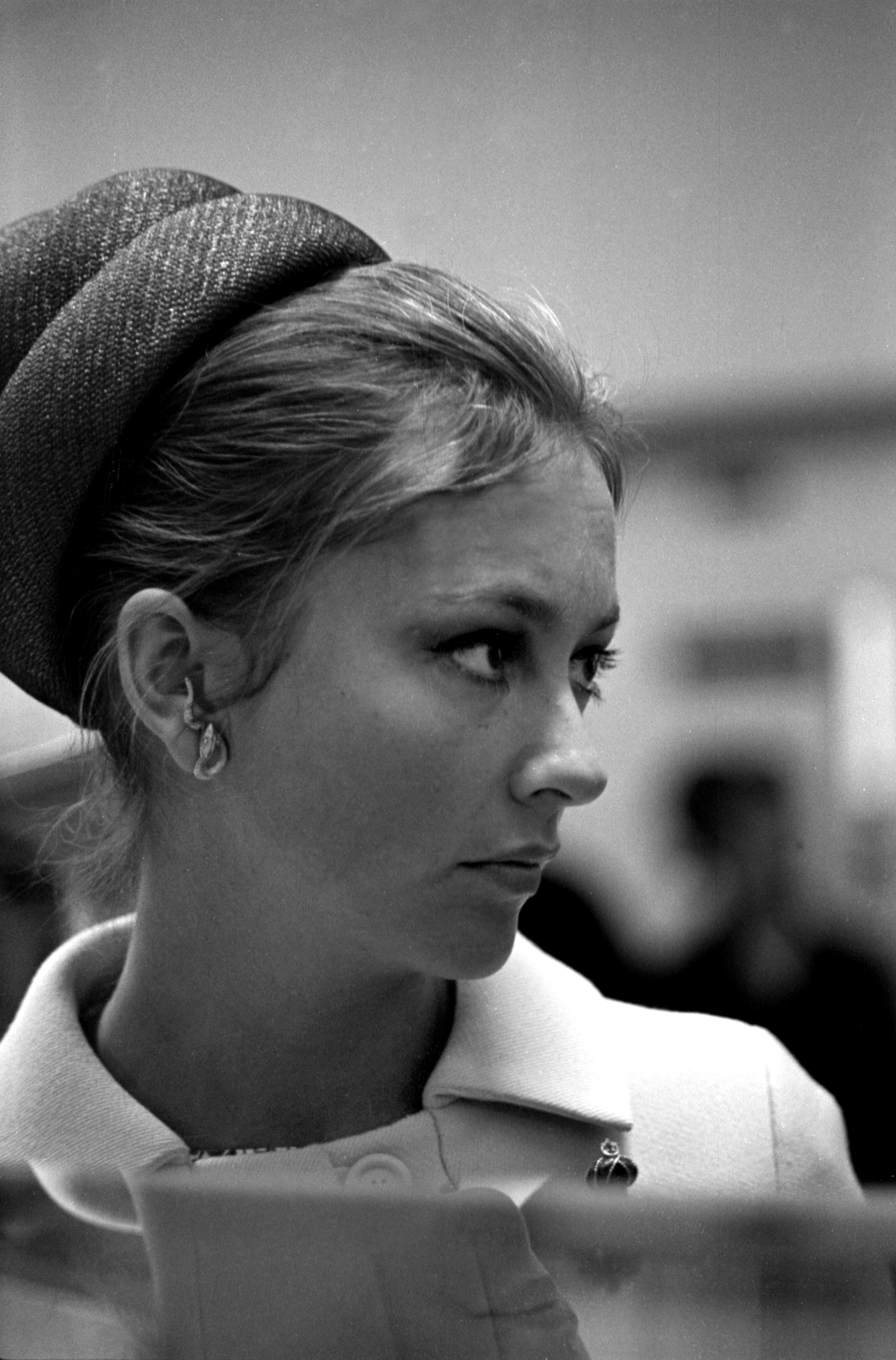
Queen Paola of Belgium in 1967

- Ruffo della Scaletta: branch originating from the Bagnara line in the 17th century with Antonio Ruffo (1610–1678); Princes of Scaletta, Princes of Floresta, Barons of Guidomandri, Monaco, Luponaro, San Giorgio, Cucco, Randé, Castellana and Fegotto; lords of Giampilieri, Molino and Altolia; noble patricians of Messina.
- Ruffo di Bagnara: extinct branch originating from the Sinopoli line in the late 15th century with Esaù Ruffo; Barons of San Lucido; Dukes of Bagnara and Baranello; Princes of Sant’Antimo, Fiumara di Muro, and Motta San Giovanni; Marquesses of Guardia; Neapolitan patricians.
- Ruffo di Castelcicala: branch from the Bagnara line in the 17th century with Fabrizio (1648–1720); Barons and later Princes of Castelcicala; Neapolitan patricians. This branch became extinct in the second half of the 19th century through the marriage of Giustina, daughter of Paolo, to Marquis Giuseppe Corio di Sacconago. Their daughter Paolina married Giuseppe Sallier de La Tour in 1893, who maritali nomine obtained the titles of Prince of Castelcicala and Duke of Calvello (Ministerial Decree, 20 October 1907).
- Ruffo de Laric or de La Ric (formerly Roux de Laric): extinct French branch originating from the Sinopoli line in the 14th century with Carlo Ruffo; Counts of Laric; Marquesses of Courbons; Barons of Oze; Neapolitan patricians.
- Roux de Lamanon: French branch originating in the 15th century from the de Laric line; co-lords of Lamanon and Aurons.
- Roux de Beauvezet: extinct French branch originating in the 15th century from the de Laric line; lords of Beauvezet.
- Ruffo de Bonneval de La Fare (formerly Roux de Bonneval): French, later Belgian, branch originating from the Sinopoli line with Ruggero Ruffo in the 14th century; Lords of Bonneval; Marquesses de La Fare; Neapolitan patricians.

== See also ==
- Castello Ruffo di Scilla
- Castello Ruffo di Amendolea
- Castello Ruffo di Nicotera
- Palazzo Ruffo della Scaletta
