= Domenico =

- Pronunciation: Italian: [doˈmeːniko]
- Gender: Male

Origin
- Region of origin: Italy

Other names
- Related names: Dominic

Domenico is an Italian given name for males and may refer to:

- Domenico Agostini (1825–1891), Italian Roman Catholic cardinal
- Domenico Alfani, Italian painter
- Domenico Allegri, Italian composer
- Domenico Alvaro, Italian mobster
- Domenico Ambrogi, Italian painter
- Domenico Auria, Italian architect
- Domenico del Barbiere, Florentine artist
- Domenico di Bartolo, Italian painter
- Domenico Bartolucci, Italian Roman Catholic cardinal
- Domenico di Pace Beccafumi, Italian painter
- Domenico Pignatelli di Belmonte, Italian Roman Catholic cardinal
- Domenico Berardi, Italian footballer
- Domenico Bernini, son of Gian Lorenzo Bernini
- Domenico Bidognetti, Italian criminal
- Domenico Bollani, Venetian diplomat and politician
- Domenico Canale, Italian-American distributor
- Domenico Caprioli, Italian painter
- Domenico Caruso, Italian poet and writer
- Domenico Cefalù, Italian-American mobster
- Domenico Cimarosa, Italian composer
- Domenico Cirillo, Italian physician and patriot
- Domenico Colombo, father of Christopher Columbus
- Domenico Comino, Italian politician
- Domenico Condello, Italian mobster
- Domenico Corcione, Italian general
- Domenico Cotugno, Italian physician
- Domenico Criscito, Italian footballer
- Domenico Crivelli, British singer
- Domenico De Sole, Italian businessman
- Domenico della Rovere, Italian Roman Catholic cardinal
- Domenico dell'Allio, Italian architect
- Domenico Di Carlo, Italian football coach
- Domenico Dolce, Italian fashion designer
- Domenico Fetti, Italian painter
- Domenico Fisichella, Italian academic and politician
- Domenico Fontana, Italian Renaissance architect
- Domenico Gabrielli, Italian composer and cello player
- Domenico Gagini, Italian sculptor
- Domenico Gallo, Italian composer
- Domenico Gargiulo, Italian painter
- Domenico Gattilusio, ruler of Lesbos
- Domenico Ghirlandaio, Italian painter
- Domenico Ghislandi, Italian painter
- Domenico Giannace, Italian politician
- Domenico Gilardi, Italian architect
- Domenico Ginnasi, Italian Roman Catholic cardinal
- Domenico Gnoli, several people
- Domenico Grimani, Italian Roman Catholic cardinal
- Domenico Guglielmini, Italian scientist
- Domenico Leccisi, Italian politician
- Domenico Losurdo, Italian Marxist philosopher
- Domenico Lucano, Italian politician
- Domenico Maggiotto, Italian painter
- Domenico Meldolesi, Italian cyclist
- Domenico di Michelino, Italian painter
- Domenico Michiel, Doge of Venice
- Domenico Millelire, Italian patriot
- Domenico Modugno, Italian singer, actor and politician
- Domenico Montagnana, Italian master luthier
- Domenico Morelli (1823–1901), Italian painter
- Domenico Maria Muratori, Italian painter
- Domenico Mustafà, Italian singer and composer
- Domenico Quaglio the Elder, Italian painter
- Domenico Quaglio the Younger, German painter
- Domenico Padovano, Italian Roman Catholic prelate
- Domenico Passignano, Italian painter
- Domenico da Piacenza, Italian Renaissance dancing master
- Domenico Piola, Italian painter
- Domenico Pellegrini, several people
- Domenico Riccio, Italian painter
- Domenico Rosselli, Italian sculptor
- Domenico Rossi, several people
- Domenico Savino, Italian conductor
- Domenico Scarlatti, Italian composer
- Domenico Starnone, Italian writer
- Domenico Tedesco, Italian-German football manager
- Domenico Tintoretto, Italian painter
- Domenico Trezzini, Swiss-Italian architect
- Domenico Maria Viani, Italian painter
- Domenico Zampaglione, Italian footballer
- Domenico Zipoli (1688–1726), Italian composer and Jesuit missionary.

Surname

People with the surname include:

- Daniel D. Domenico, American federal district judge
- Di Domenico brothers, Italian film directors

== See also ==
- Domenic
- Dominic
- Mimmo, a hypocorism
