= Mimmo =

Mimmo is an Italian masculine given name, often occurring as a short form for Domenico. Notable people with the name include:

- Mimmo Calopresti (born 1955), Italian film director, screenwriter, producer and actor
- Mimmo Candito (1941–2018), Italian war correspondent
- Mimmo Catania (born 1955), Italian painter
- Mimmo Cavallo (born 1951), Italian singer-songwriter and composer
- Mimmo Cozzolino (born 1949), Italian-born Australian graphic designer and photo media artist
- Mimmo Cuticchio (born 1948), Italian cantastorie, puppeteer, actor and playwright
- Mimmo Jodice (1934–2025), Italian photographer and academic
- Mimmo Liguoro (1941–2026), Italian journalist
- Mimmo Locasciulli (born 1949), Italian singer-songwriter, composer, producer and musician
- Mimmo Lucà (1953–2025), Italian politician
- Mimmo Paladino (born 1948), Italian sculptor, painter and printmaker
- Mimmo Palmara (1928–2016), Italian actor
- Mimmo Poli (1920–1986), Italian film character actor
- Mimmo Politanò (born 1958), Italian singer-songwriter, writer, painter and radio host
- Mimmo Rotella (1918–2006), Italian artist
- Mimmo Sepe (1955–2020), Italian actor and comedian

== See also ==
- Charley and Mimmo, an animated children's television series (1999–2002)
