= Fondacaro =

Fondacaro is a surname. Notable people with the surname include:

- Carlos Fondacaro (born 1987), Argentine footballer
- Phil Fondacaro (born 1958), American actor and stuntman
- Vincenzo Fondacaro (1844–1893), Italian captain
