= Guidomandri =

Former comune in Italy

- Frazione
- Location of Guidomandri in Italy
- Coordinates: 38.04706°N 15.44738°E
- Country: Italy
- Region: Sicily
- Metropolitan city: Messina
- Comune: Scaletta Zanclea
- Elevation: 97 m (318 ft)

Population (2012)
  - Total: est. 150
- Time zone: UTC+1 (CET)
  - Summer (DST): UTC+2 (CEST)
- GeoNames ID: 9035606

Guidomandri was a comune (municipality) in Sicily; in 1928, it was incorporated as a frazione into the modern-day comune Scaletta Zanclea.

During the 2009 Messina floods and mudslides, Guidomandri was particularly affected.

== Related comuni ==
- Itala
- Scaletta Zanclea
