= Scido =

Scido Σκιντούς (Greek)
- Comune
- Comune di Scido
- Location within Italy Location within Calabria
- Coordinates: 38°15′N 15°56′E
- Country: Italy
- Region: Calabria
- Metropolitan city: Reggio Calabria (RC)
- Frazioni: Santa Giorgia

Area
  - Total: 17.7 km^{2} (6.8 sq mi)
- Elevation: 435 m (1,427 ft)

Population (Dec. 2004)
  - Total: 1,029
  - Density: 58.1/km^{2} (151/sq mi)
- Demonym: Scidesi
- Time zone: UTC+1 (CET)
  - Summer (DST): UTC+2 (CEST)
- Postal code: 89010
- Dialing code: 0966
- Website: Official website

Scido (Calabrian Greek: Σκιντούς, romanized: Skintoús) is a comune (municipality) in the Province of Reggio Calabria in the Italian region Calabria, located about 90 kilometres (56 mi) southwest of Catanzaro and about 30 kilometres (19 mi) northeast of Reggio Calabria. As of 31 December 2004, it had a population of 1,029 and an area of 17.7 square kilometres (6.8 mi^{2}).

The municipality of Scido contains the frazione (subdivision) Santa Giorgia.

Scido borders the following municipalities: Cosoleto, Delianuova, San Luca, Santa Cristina d'Aspromonte.

== Demographic evolution ==
Historical population

Year	Pop.	±%
1861	914	—
1871	1,163	+27.2%
1881	1,289	+10.8%
1901	1,620	+25.7%
1911	1,894	+16.9%

Year	Pop.	±%
1921	2,007	+6.0%
1931	2,156	+7.4%
1936	2,225	+3.2%
1951	2,257	+1.4%
1961	1,835	−18.7%

Year	Pop.	±%
1971	1,455	−20.7%
1981	1,291	−11.3%
1991	1,152	−10.8%
2001	1,047	−9.1%

Source: Data from ISTAT
