= Sant'Eufemia d'Aspromonte =

Sant'Eufemia d'Aspromonte Αγία Ευθυμία (Greek)
- Comune
- Comune di Sant'Eufemia d'Aspromonte
- Sant'Eufemia within the Province of Reggio Calabria

- Location within Italy Location within Calabria
- Coordinates: 38°16′N 15°52′E
- Country: Italy
- Region: Calabria
- Metropolitan city: Reggio Calabria (RC)

Area
  - Total: 32.9 km^{2} (12.7 sq mi)

Population (Dec. 2004)
  - Total: 4,061
  - Density: 123/km^{2} (320/sq mi)
- Time zone: UTC+1 (CET)
  - Summer (DST): UTC+2 (CEST)
- Postal code: 89027
- Dialing code: 0966

Sant'Eufemia d'Aspromonte is a comune (municipality) in the Province of Reggio Calabria in the Italian region Calabria, located about 90 kilometres (56 mi) southwest of Catanzaro and about 25 kilometres (16 mi) northeast of Reggio Calabria. As of 31 December 2004, it had a population of 4,061 and an area of 32.9 square kilometres (12.7 mi^{2}).

== Overview ==
Sant'Eufemia d'Aspromonte borders the following municipalities: Bagnara Calabra, Melicuccà, San Procopio, Scilla, Sinopoli.

Robert Guiscard established a monastery here in the 11th century. Its first abbot was Robert de Grantmesnil, the exiled abbot of Saint-Evroul-sur-Ouche, who brought with him 11 monks and began a musical tradition at Sant'Eufemia to rival the fame of that of Saint-Evroul.

Sant'Eufemia was one of 300 villages devastated by the 1783 Calabrian earthquakes.

The PBS show Finding Your Roots revealed that the ancestors of Joy Behar hailed from this village.

== Demographic evolution ==
Historical population

Year	Pop.	±%
1861	5,967	—
1871	6,289	+5.4%
1881	5,888	−6.4%
1901	6,285	+6.7%
1911	6,136	−2.4%

Year	Pop.	±%
1921	6,027	−1.8%
1931	6,199	+2.9%
1936	6,057	−2.3%
1951	6,477	+6.9%
1961	5,897	−9.0%

Year	Pop.	±%
1971	5,081	−13.8%
1981	4,223	−16.9%
1991	4,184	−0.9%
2001	4,074	−2.6%

Source: Data from ISTAT
