= San Procopio =

San Procopio San Pricopi (Sicilian), Ágios Prokópios (Greek)
- Comune
- Comune di San Procopio
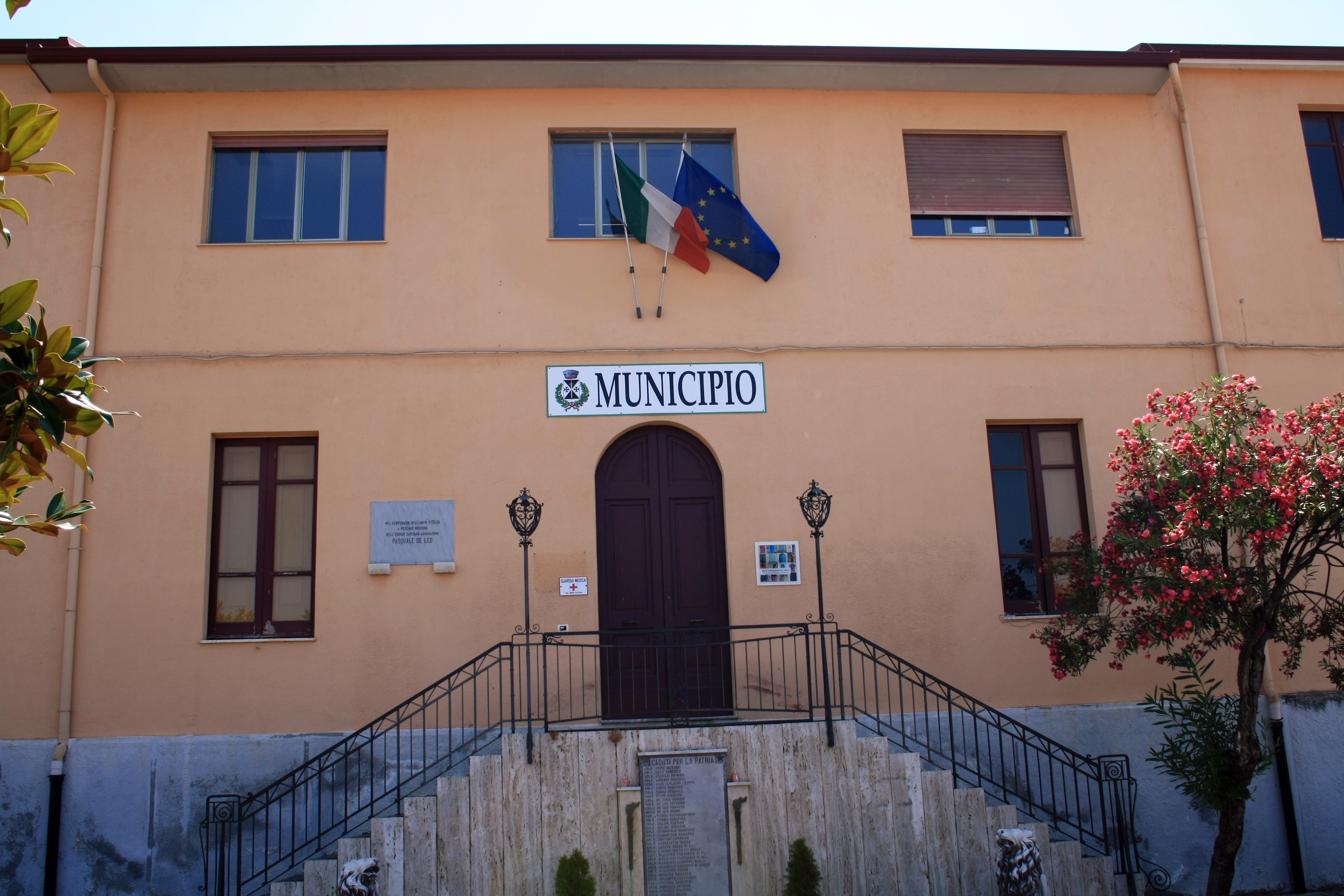
- Town hall

- Location within Italy Location within Calabria
- Coordinates: 38°17′N 15°54′E
- Country: Italy
- Region: Calabria
- Metropolitan city: Reggio Calabria (RC)

Area
  - Total: 10.7 km^{2} (4.1 sq mi)

Population (Dec. 2004)
  - Total: 592
  - Density: 55.3/km^{2} (143/sq mi)
- Time zone: UTC+1 (CET)
  - Summer (DST): UTC+2 (CEST)
- Postal code: 89020
- Dialing code: 0966

San Procopio (Calabrian: San Pricopi; Greek: Άγιος Προκόπιος, romanized: Ágios Prokópios) is a comune (municipality) in the Province of Reggio Calabria in the Italian region Calabria, located about 90 kilometres (56 mi) southwest of Catanzaro and about 30 kilometres (19 mi) northeast of Reggio Calabria. As of 31 December 2004, it had a population of 592 and an area of 10.7 square kilometres (4.1 mi^{2}).

San Procopio borders the following municipalities: Cosoleto, Melicuccà, Oppido Mamertina, Sant'Eufemia d'Aspromonte, Seminara, Sinopoli.

== Demographic evolution ==
Historical population

Year	Pop.	±%
1861	990	—
1871	1,078	+8.9%
1881	951	−11.8%
1901	1,004	+5.6%
1911	1,149	+14.4%

Year	Pop.	±%
1921	1,179	+2.6%
1931	1,336	+13.3%
1936	1,405	+5.2%
1951	1,523	+8.4%
1961	1,208	−20.7%

Year	Pop.	±%
1971	876	−27.5%
1981	738	−15.8%
1991	708	−4.1%
2001	617	−12.9%

Source: Data from ISTAT
