= Leontius Pilatus =

Italian scholar (died 1366)

- Born: Leontius Pilatus (Leonzio Pilato); Seminara, Reggio Calabria, Calabria
- Died: 1366; Gulf of Venice
- Occupations: Greek literature, Latin literature, Theology and Philosophy
- Writing career
- Literary movement: Italian Renaissance

Leontius Pilatus (Greek: Λεόντιος Πιλάτος, Leontios Pilatos, Italian: Leonzio Pilato; died 1366) was a Greek scholar from Calabria and was one of the earliest promoters of Greek studies in Western Europe. Leontius translated into Latin and commented upon works of Euripides, Aristotle and Homer, including the Odyssey and the Iliad, and was the first professor of Greek in western Europe.

== Biography ==
Leontius Pilatus was of Greek origin, born in Calabria. He was a disciple of Barlaam of Seminara. Giovanni Boccaccio and Petrarch persuaded Leontius to produce a complete translation of the Homeric poems. For more than two years, from 1360 to 1362, Leontius lived in Boccaccio's house in Florence, worked with him on Homer, and taught Greek. Boccaccio's mythological works, and especially, The Genealogy of the Pagan Gods were influenced by Leontius and his knowledge; according to Edward Gibbon: "a work, in that age, of stupendous erudition, and which he ostentatiously sprinkled with Greek characters and passages, to excite the wonder and applause of his more ignorant readers." Petrarch received copies of Leontius' translations around 1367, from Boccaccio. It is through this connection with Petrarch and Boccaccio, that the important contribution of Pilatus to the revival of Greek in Western scholarship was effected. Petrarch's manuscripts contain a number of notes which show that he, like Boccaccio, gathered information on Greek mythology from Leontius. However, unlike Boccaccio, Petrarch seems to have been disappointed with Leontius' translations. Leontius had followed the word-for-word method used for translation from Greek into Latin in the West during the Middle Ages, which guarantees that the factual contents of the original are kept intact, but which does not entirely grasp the text's literary and stylistic qualities. Collucio Salutati also owned copies of Leontius' translations of the Homeric poems, but like Petrarch, he was critical of them. The Marquis de Sade praised the "lively and dramatic manner" of Leontius' translations. Pilatus was killed when lightning struck a ship's mast while he was standing against it, on a voyage from Constantinople. He and his translations were made known in modern times through the writings and acknowledgments of Humphrey Hody and the Marquis de Sade.

== See also ==
- Byzantine scholars in Renaissance
- Barlaam of Seminara
- Greek–Calabrian dialect
