= Domenico Maceri =

Italian-American educator and journalist

Domenico Maceri (born 1952) is an Italian-American educator and journalist. He retired after teaching for thirty-five years at Allan Hancock College but continues his work as a journalist, writing a weekly column in Italian for America Oggi.

== Early life and education ==
Maceri was born in Pellegrina, Bagnara, Reggio Calabria, Italy, and moved to the US with his family as a teenager. After completing high school, he went on to obtain a BA in French and Spanish at New Jersey City University. Subsequent studies led to an MA in Italian literature at UCLA where he also served as a teaching assistant. In 1990, he completed a PhD in Comparative Literature (Italian, French, Spanish) at the University of California at Santa Barbara.

== Academic career ==
As a faculty member at Allan Hancock College, Maceri taught Spanish, French, and Italian. He published a book on Pirandello, one on Spanish grammar, and another on Italian grammar. He also published a number of academic articles in Italian Quarterly, Selecta, Hispania, Mosaic, Mester, Language Magazine, Italian Journal, Teacher Magazine, World Literature Today, and elsewhere.

== Journalistic career ==
Maceri has published op-ed pieces in English in The Japan Times, The Washington Times, The Chicago Tribune, The New York Times, and many other newspapers on a wide range of topics including multilingualism, immigration, and politics. Maceri has also published op-eds in Italian on similar topics in Il Nuovo Riformista, Le Opinioni delle Libertà, L'Unità, etc. He writes a weekly column for America Oggi. In 2005, one of his editorials won an award from the National Association of Hispanic Publications.
