= Cosoleto =

- Comune
- Comune di Cosoleto
- Location within Italy Location within Calabria
- Coordinates: 38°16′N 15°56′E
- Country: Italy
- Region: Calabria
- Metropolitan city: Reggio Calabria (RC)

Area
  - Total: 33.8 km^{2} (13.1 sq mi)

Population (Dec. 2004)
  - Total: 1,006
  - Density: 29.8/km^{2} (77.1/sq mi)
- Time zone: UTC+1 (CET)
  - Summer (DST): UTC+2 (CEST)
- Postal code: 89050
- Dialing code: 0966

Cosoleto (Calabrian: Cosolìtu) is a comune (municipality) in the Province of Reggio Calabria in the Italian region Calabria, located about 90 kilometres (56 mi) southwest of Catanzaro and about 30 kilometres (19 mi) northeast of Reggio Calabria. As of 31 December 2004, it had a population of 1,006 and an area of 33.8 square kilometres (13.1 mi^{2}).

Cosoleto borders the following municipalities: Africo, Delianuova, Oppido Mamertina, Roghudi, Samo, San Luca, San Procopio, Santa Cristina d'Aspromonte, Scido, Sinopoli.

== Demographic evolution ==
Historical population

Year	Pop.	±%
1861	1,389	—
1871	1,715	+23.5%
1881	1,429	−16.7%
1901	1,817	+27.2%
1911	2,206	+21.4%

Year	Pop.	±%
1921	2,313	+4.9%
1931	2,361	+2.1%
1936	2,514	+6.5%
1951	2,603	+3.5%
1961	1,984	−23.8%

Year	Pop.	±%
1971	1,724	−13.1%
1981	1,382	−19.8%
1991	1,154	−16.5%
2001	976	−15.4%

Source: Data from ISTAT
