= Briga Superiore =

- Frazione
- Location of Briga Superiore in Italy
- Coordinates: 38°05′N 15°28′E
- Country: Italy
- Region: Sicily
- Province: Messina
- Comune: Messina
- Elevation: 50 m (160 ft)

Population (2001)
  - Total: 215
- Demonym: Brigoti
- Time zone: UTC+1 (CET)
  - Summer (DST): UTC+2 (CEST)
- Dialing code: 090
- Patron saint: Saint George

Briga Superiore is a frazione of the comune of Messina in the Province of Messina, Sicily, southern Italy. It stands at an elevation of 50 metres above sea level. At the time of the Istat census of 2001 it had 215 inhabitants.

The frazione suffered heavily in the mudslides which devastated the area in 2009.
