= Melicuccà =

Melicuccà Μελικούκοι (Greek)
- Comune
- Comune di Melicuccà
- Coat of arms

- Location within Italy Location within Calabria
- Coordinates: 38°18′N 15°53′E
- Country: Italy
- Region: Calabria
- Metropolitan city: Reggio Calabria (RC)

Government
  - Mayor: Emanuele Antonio Oliveri

Area
  - Total: 17.2 km^{2} (6.6 sq mi)

Population (December 2007)
  - Total: 1,028
  - Density: 59.8/km^{2} (155/sq mi)
- Demonym: Melicucchesi
- Time zone: UTC+1 (CET)
  - Summer (DST): UTC+2 (CEST)
- Postal code: 89020
- Dialing code: 0966

Melicuccà (Calabrian Greek: Μελικούκοι, romanized: Melikoúkoi) is a comune (municipality) in the Province of Reggio Calabria in the Italian region Calabria, located about 90 kilometres (56 mi) southwest of Catanzaro and about 30 kilometres (19 mi) northeast of Reggio Calabria.

Melicuccà borders the following municipalities: Bagnara Calabra, San Procopio, Sant'Eufemia d'Aspromonte, Seminara.
