= Seminara =

- Comune
- Comune di Seminara
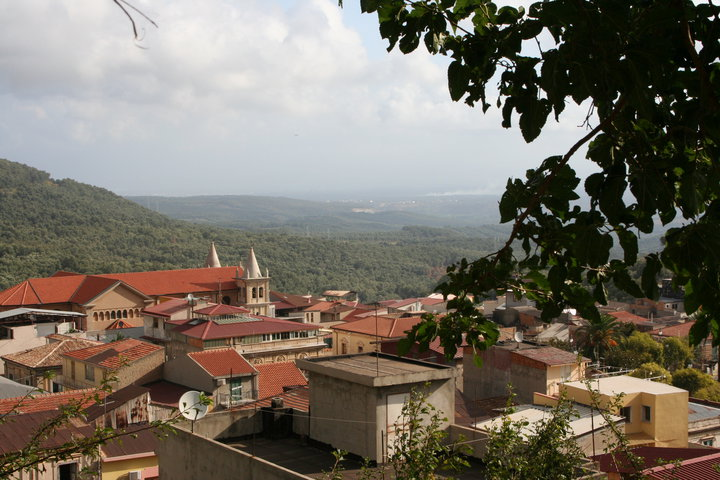

- Location within Italy Location within Calabria
- Coordinates: 38°20′N 15°52′E
- Country: Italy
- Region: Calabria
- Metropolitan city: Reggio Calabria (RC)
- Frazioni: Barritteri, Sant'Anna di Seminara

Government
  - Mayor: Antonio Bonamico

Area
  - Total: 33.6 km^{2} (13.0 sq mi)
- Elevation: 290 m (950 ft)

Population (31 October 2008)
  - Total: 3,125
  - Density: 93.0/km^{2} (241/sq mi)
- Time zone: UTC+1 (CET)
  - Summer (DST): UTC+2 (CEST)
- Postal code: 89028
- Dialing code: 0966

Seminara is a comune (municipality) in the Province of Reggio Calabria in the Italian region Calabria, located about 90 kilometres (56 mi) southwest of Catanzaro and about 30 kilometres (19 mi) northeast of Reggio Calabria.

Seminara borders the following municipalities: Bagnara Calabra, Gioia Tauro, Melicuccà, Oppido Mamertina, Palmi, Rizziconi, San Procopio.

The Battle of Seminara in the First Italian War occurred near the town in 1495. Seminara was also the birthplace of Barlaam of Seminara and Leontius Pilatus, who were two of the most important Byzantine scholars of the Renaissance period.

== Notable people ==
- Barlaam of Seminara (14th century Greek scholar, humanist, philologist and theologian)
- Leontius Pilatus (14th century Greek scholar, philosopher and theologian)
