= Mimmo Catania =

Italian painter (born 1955)

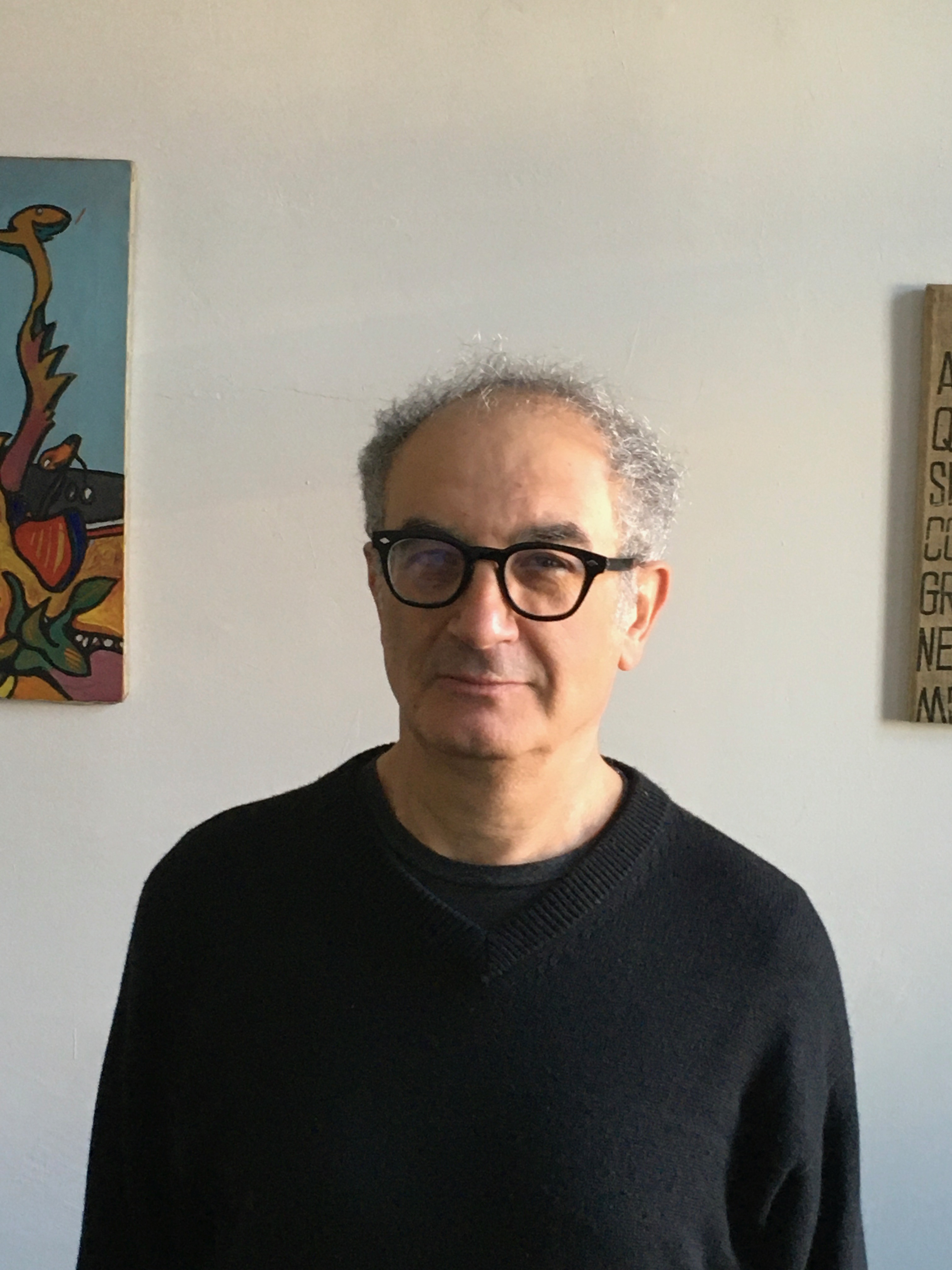
- Born: 1955 (age 70–71); Vittoria, Sicily, Italy
- Education: Accademia di Belle Arti di Urbino
- Occupation: Painter

Mimmo Catania (born 1955 in Vittoria, Sicily) is a painter. He works also as a graphic artist, draftsman, photographer, installation artist and writer.

== Life ==
He attended the Academy of Fine Arts in Urbino where he studied painting from 1980 to 1984, and moved after graduation to Berlin where he has been living ever since.

== Career ==
In 1995, he was artist in residence at Art/Omi Artists international Residency, Ghent N.Y., supported by the Senate of Berlin, in 1996, he spent six months in Israel with a grant from KULTURFONDs Berlin, where he was also invited as a lecturer at the Haifa University, Department of Fine Arts, and at the Wizo College. In 1998, he was artist in residence for six months at the Casa di Goethe, thanks to a grant of the DaimlerCrysler Foundation, Rome.

In 2005, he received the Pollock-Krasner Foundation Grant, New York, and again in 2016.

In 2007, he was artist in residence at the Santa Fe Art Institute, Santa Fe, with a grant of the Joan Mitchell Foundation, New York, and in 2008 in Beijing.

== Works ==
Catania mainly works as a painter in oil on canvas. At the beginning of his artistic career he was strongly influenced by informal art, which allowed him to create artworks in his very own personal style. Following a residency at the Casa di Goethe in Rome in 1998 Catania turned to figurative art by developing a very special language which he calls ‘meta-realism’. They recall images which belong to our collective memory. They deal with crises of identity, aggression and loneliness, as virulent phenomena of our time.

In the series of ‘Attacks’ (2013) or ‘Burning cars’ (2014) Catania turned to topics of crude and primordial energy.

Other works capture spaces/interiors that are impossible to define, in which volatile light sources mark unstable levels of reality.

In his paintings gestural expressions are severely reduced. The focus is on the absence rather than on the presence, backgrounds swap with foregrounds, the rules of perspective are suspended, interiors are bloated. The cohesion of the world is in dissolution, pattern of carpets, ornaments have gained their own lives, various light sources are disorientating, reflections make it impossible to understand what is inside and what is outside of one's sphere.

== Writings ==
His novel “Quattro secondi di Nero” was published in 2018 by Albatros/Il Filo, Rome. Ranging from comic to grotesque, it deals with the contemporary art market, “inspired”, as the author says “by not entirely unlikely events.”

== Residencies and grants ==
2016	Pollock-Krasner Foundation Grant, New York
2012	Katalogförderung, Senate of Berlin, Berlin
2008	Studio at Pickled Art Centre, Beijing
2007	Joan Mitchell Foundation Grant, New York, for Residency at Santa Fe Art Institute, Santa Fe
2006	Residency at House Radobolja Colony, Mostar
2005	Pollock-Krasner Foundation Grant, New York
1998–99	DaimlerChrysler Grant for Residency at Casa di Goethe, Rome
1996	Grant from KULTURfonds Foundation, Berlin, for a residency in Haifa
1995	Grant from the Senate of Berlin for Art Omi, International Artists' Residency Program, New York

== Solo exhibitions (selection) ==
2019	Interior Shot, Dispari&Dispari Project, Berlin
2016	Overturn, Galleria Civica d'Arte Contemporanea Montevergini, Siracusa, IT
2015	Storm, TAM, Torrance Art Museum, Torrance (CA), US
	Shutter-Schütter, Irena Kos Arte Contemporanea, Pietrasanta, Italy
2009	Expected News, Galerija Charlama, Sarajevo
	Shouting all lifelong, Istituto Italiano di Cultura, Cologne
	Catcher in the Act, Tallina Kunstihoone/City Art Hall Gallery, Tallinn
2007	Set on Wet, Santa Fe Art Institute, Santa Fe, New Mexico
1999	Mimmo Catania, Casa di Goethe Museum, Rome

== Group exhibitions (selection) ==
2019	Bridges and Walls, Walls and Bridges, AC Institute, New York
2016	Murder, she said, Anya and Andrew Shiva Gallery, New York
2013	Personal Structures, Palazzo Bembo, Collateral Events, 55. Biennale di Venezia, Venice
2001	Markers (Tableau der Menschheit), 49. Biennale di Venezia, Venice
1994	Schattensprung, Center for Contemporary Art, Ujazdowski Castle, Warsaw
1992	Projekt 37 Räume, Kunst-Werke, Institute for Contemporary Art, Berlin

== Catalogues (selection) ==
“Odd One Out”, Verlag für zeitgenössische Kunst und Theorie, Berlin, 2017
“Overturn”, Galleria Civica d’Arte Contemporanea Montevergini, Siracusa, 2016
“Storm”, Torrance Art Museum, Torrance, CA, 2015
“Reunion | Works 1982–2012”, Verlag für zeitgenössische Kunst und Theorie, Berlin, 2012
“Markers”, 49. Biennale di Venezia, Venice, 2001
“Schattensprung”, Warsaw -Berlin, Museumspädagogischer Dienst Berlin, 1994
“Reflessioni”, Galerie Lou-Lou Lazard, Berlin, 1990

== Works in Public Collections ==
Works by Mimmo Catania are in the Francis Greenburger Collection, New York, DaimlerChrysler Casa di Goethe, Rome, Museum Bagheria, Bagheria, Center for Contemporary Art, Warsaw, Künstlerförderung des Landes Berlin, IIC, Los Angeles, IIC, Colonia, Tallinn City Hall, Tallinn, Galleria Civica Arte Contemporanea, Marsala, Santa Fe Art Institute, Santa Fe

== Interviews (selection) ==
2016 Brainard Carey: Interviews from Yale University Radio WYBCX
2013 Marie j Burrows: Painting no-place but still smiling. Artparasites, Berlin
2009 Selma Karadza: Unexpectedly on the Expected Events. Depo Portal, Sarajevo
