= Domenico Pellegrini =

Domenico Pellegrini may refer to:

- Domenico Pellegrini (painter) (1759–1840), painter in Milan
- Domenico Pellegrini Giampietro (1899–1970), fascist academic in Italy
