= Domenico Rossi =

Domenico Rossi may refer to:

- Domenico Rossi (architect) (1657–1737), Swiss-born Italian architect
- Domenico Rossi (footballer) (born 2000), Italian football player
- Domenico Rossi (general) (born 1951), Italian general and politician
- Domenico Egidio Rossi (1659–1715), Italian architect

== See also ==
- Domenico de' Rossi (1659–1730), Italian sculptor and engraver
