= Giampilieri Superiore =

Giampilieri Superiore Γκαμπιλιέρι Σουπεριόρε
- Frazione
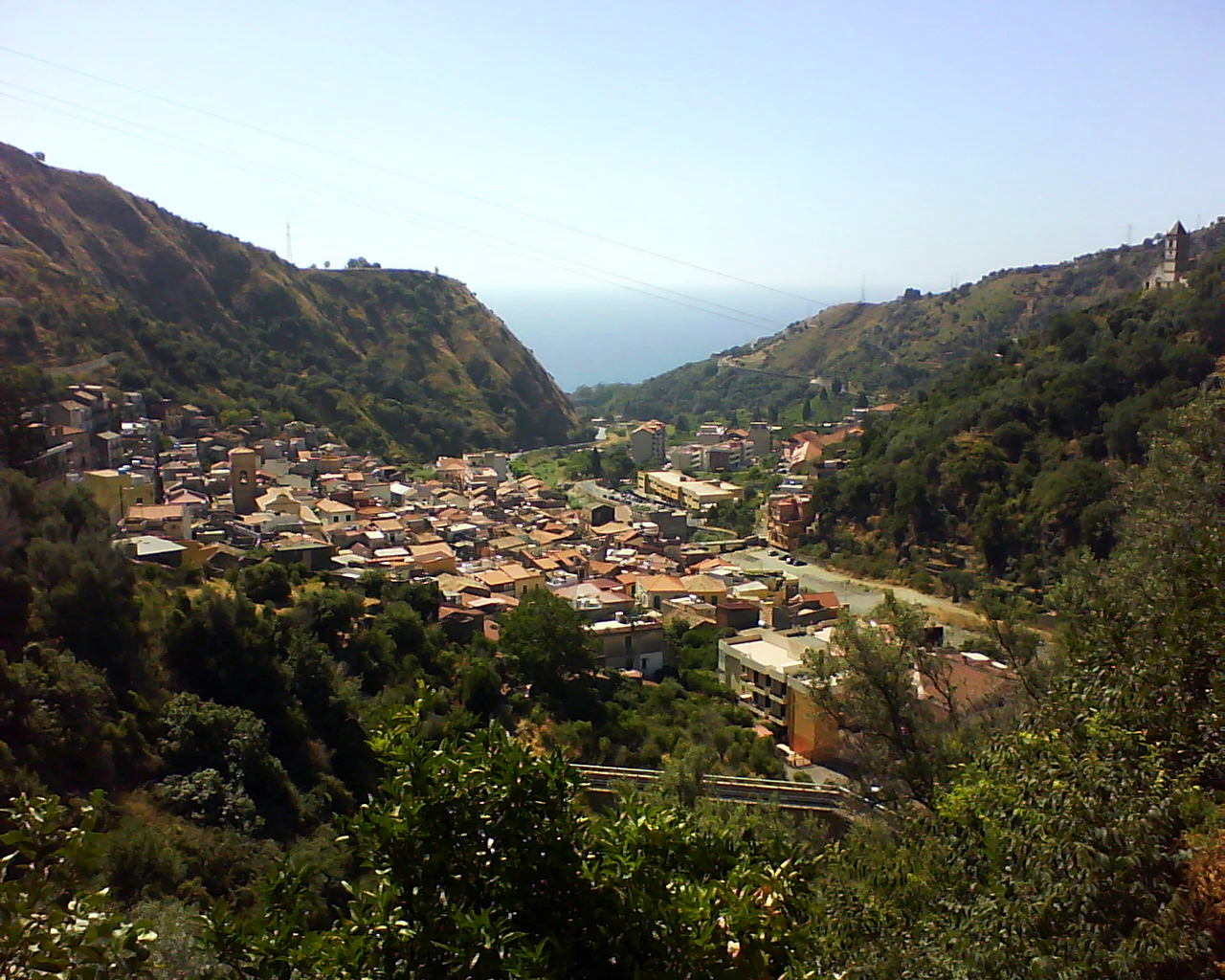
- panoramic view of the upper Giampilieri

- Location of Giampilieri Superiore in Italy
- Coordinates: 38°04′N 15°28′E
- Country: Italy
- Region: Sicily
- Province: Messina
- Comune: Messina
- Elevation: 75 m (246 ft)

Population (2001)
  - Total: 1,800
- Demonym: Giampilieresi
- Time zone: UTC+1 (CET)
  - Summer (DST): UTC+2 (CEST)
- Dialing code: 090
- Patron saint: Saint Nicholas
- Saint day: first Sunday of July

Giampilieri Superiore is a frazione of the comune of Messina in the Province of Messina, Sicily, southern Italy. It stands at an elevation of 75 metres above sea level. At the time of the Istat census of 2001, it had 1800 inhabitants.

== History ==
Between the sixteenth and early seventeenth centuries Giampilieri was affected by a consistent urban development, acquiring great importance in the area south of Messina and becoming the most important farmhouse. This is certainly confirmed by the fact that in this period two very important public buildings were built, the prison and the hospital, which involved the presence in the village of both a garrison of twenty soldiers and religious orders and knightly orders.

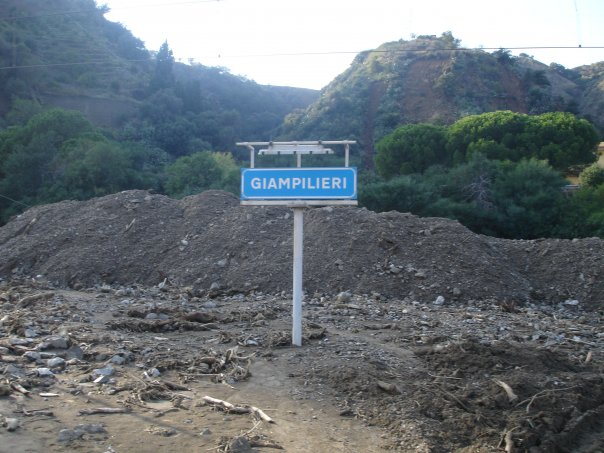
Giampilieri Superiore after the 2009 mudslide, 2 October 2009

On 1 October 2009 it sadly jumped to the headlines for the flood and the landslide, which cost 37 victims, 21 of which in the village of Giampilieri alone, together with the other neighboring territories of Giampilieri railway station, Molino, Altolia, Briga Marina, Briga Superiore and the town of Scaletta Zanclea. The village suffered heavily in the mudslides which devastated the area in 2009. Buried in mud, now it has been rebuilt.

== Traffic and public transport ==
The village is connected to the state road 114 Orientale Sicula by the provincial road nº 33, which, starting from the Giampilieri Marina crossroads, crosses the village, continuing towards Molino and Altolia. The minor viability is made up of alleys and stairways. Giampilieri is connected to the city center by two ATM bus lines: shuttle line nº 1 (Torre Faro - Giampilieri Superiore) and shuttle line nº 2 (Briga Sup.- Altolia).

Since 2010, a suburban train service has been carried out along the Messina-Catania-Syracuse railway with routes serving the stations of Fiumara Gazzi, Contesse, Tremestieri, Mili Marina, Galati, Ponte Santo Stefano, Ponte Schiavo, San Paolo and Giampilieri.

== Religious monuments ==
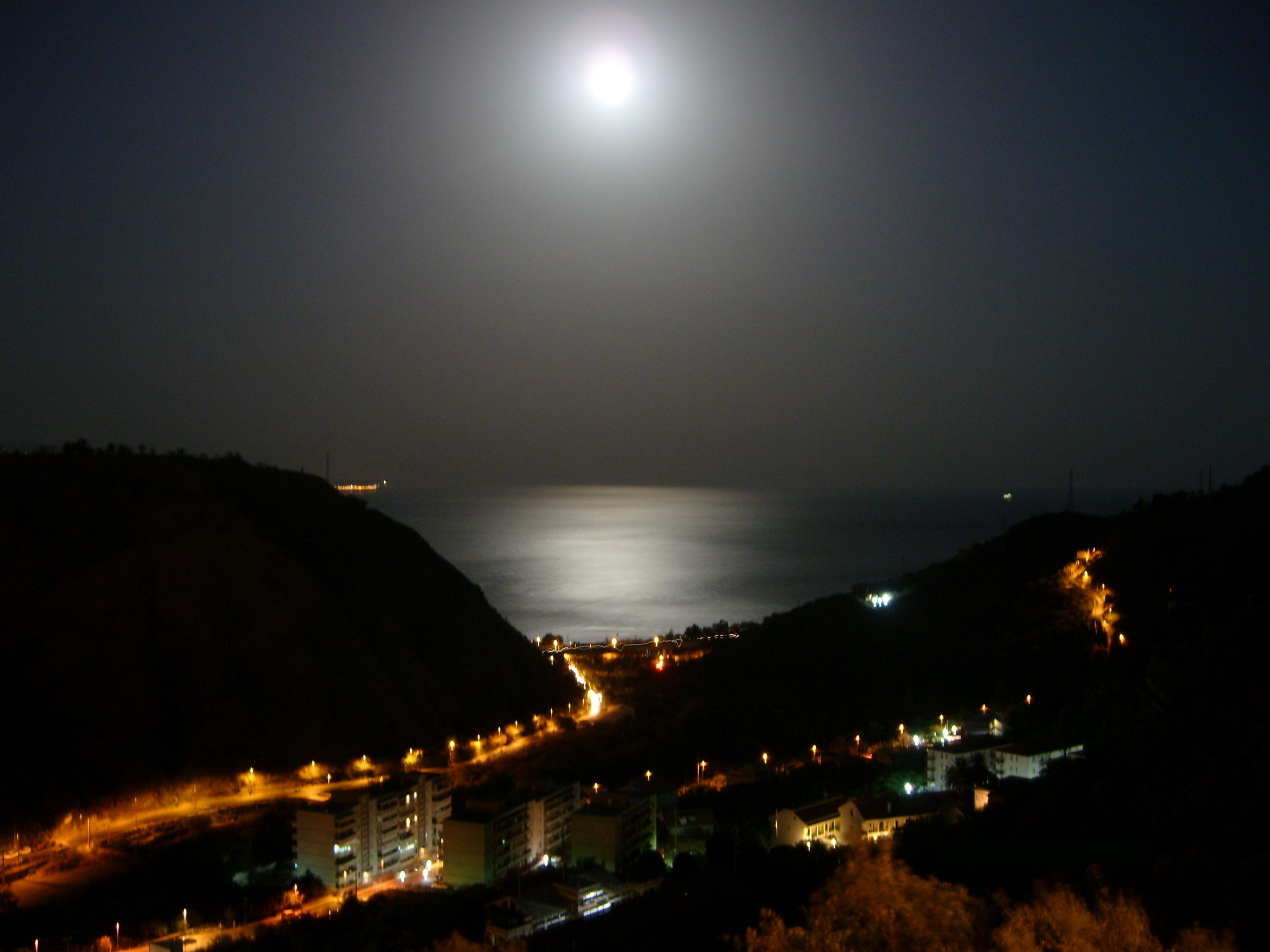
Night view from the Church of the Madonna delle Grazie

The village church is dedicated to St. Nicholas of Bari, whose cult is widespread in the area (it is also present in Pezzolo, Zafferia, Briga Superiore and Bordonaro). The church with additions and modifications, maintains the Renaissance character that distinguishes it. The interior is full of works of art of particular importance. On the hill located on the southern side of the torrent, in front of the village, stands the ancient sanctuary of the Madonna delle Grazie.
