= Bagnara Calabra =

- Comune
- Comune di Bagnara Calabra
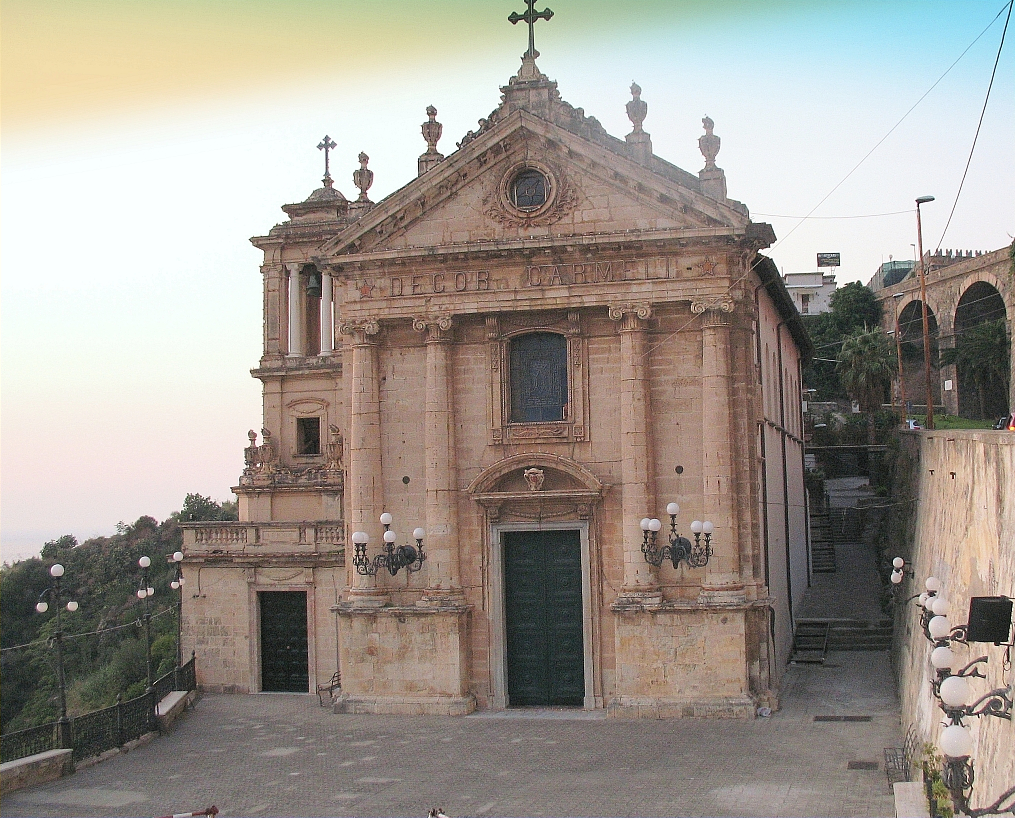
- Carmine's Church

- Location within Italy Location within Calabria
- Coordinates: 38°17′N 15°49′E
- Country: Italy
- Region: Calabria
- Metropolitan city: Reggio Calabria (RC)
- Frazioni: Ceramida (Calabrian Greek: Keramida), Solano, Pellegrina

Government
  - Mayor: Francesco Albanese Agostino

Area
  - Total: 24.85 km^{2} (9.59 sq mi)
- Elevation: 50 m (160 ft)

Population (2025)
  - Total: 9,164
  - Density: 368.8/km^{2} (955.1/sq mi)
- Demonym: Bagnaroti
- Time zone: UTC+1 (CET)
  - Summer (DST): UTC+2 (CEST)
- Postal code: 89011
- Dialing code: 0966
- Patron saint: St. Nicholas of Bari
- Saint day: 6 December
- Website: Official website

Bagnara Calabra (or simply Bagnara) is a municipality in the Province of Reggio Calabria in Calabria, Southern Italy. It is located in the hills facing the Tyrrhenian Sea on the southern tip of the region, about 100 kilometres (62 mi) southwest of Catanzaro and about 25 kilometres (16 mi) northeast of Reggio Calabria. It has a population of 9,164.

== History ==
The first organized village for which we have historical proof was around 1085 AD, with edification of "S. Mary's V.G. and XII Apostles Abbey Nullius" ordered by Roger I of Sicily.

Other historical assumptions supported by indirect proofs allow dating much further back, to being directly connected with Mamertini (sons of war-god Mars), following the First Punic War. Supporting this theory, ancient coins with the likeness of Mars were discovered and documented in this area around 1800.

Roman presence is historically proven by the ancient "Via Capua-Regium", also known as Via Popilia, built in 132 BC, through Bagnara's territory.

During the Roman era, the village was known as "Balnearum", at that time a thermal spring used by Romans.

Others claim that Bagnara was founded by Phoenicia around the 8th century BC, but there's no archaeological proof supporting this theory.

Since 1130 AD, Bagnara was part of the Kingdom of Sicily established by Roger II.

The village was almost completely destroyed by the 1783 Calabrian earthquakes and tsunami. It is recorded as the most powerful in the area, killing 59% of the population and collapsing the Abbey Nullius. The only evidence left of a late-eighteenth-century building is Carmine's Church, which was rebuilt after the earthquakes.

On 24 August 1860 followed by ten official Giuseppe Garibaldi fighting for Italian unification reached Bagnara where they were host by a member of the National Guard.

In the past the name was just Bagnara, but after the 1861 and unification of Italy, it became Bagnara Calabra to distinguish it from Bagnara di Romagna.

Bagnara was also heavily hit by the 1908 Messina earthquake.

During World War II Bagnara Calabra was involved in operations in southern Italy, which began the Allied invasion of Italy. Starting 21 July 1943, some parts of the village were lightly bombed by the Allies, in order to attack Wehrmacht forces that were preparing to retreat. Albert Kesselring and his staff strategically chose not to defend Calabria, leaving only the 29th Panzergrenadier Division's 15th Panzergrenadier Regiment, and began the German retreat. On 3 September, most of this unit was in prepared positions at Bagnara, some 40 km (25 mi) from the landings which it had orders to hold until 6 September.

On 3 September 1943 the British Eighth Army's XIII Corps, composed of the 1st Canadian and British 5th Infantry Divisions and commanded by Lieutenant-General Miles Dempsey, launched Operation Baytown under General Bernard Montgomery's direction. At 4:30 AM on 4 September 1943 the retreating Germans blew up the Caravilla Bridge. On 4 September, the British 5th Infantry Division reached Bagnara Calabra.

Bagnara preserves evidence of this British presence since the rail station area of the village is commonly known as Rione Inglese (English Quarter).

Historical monument

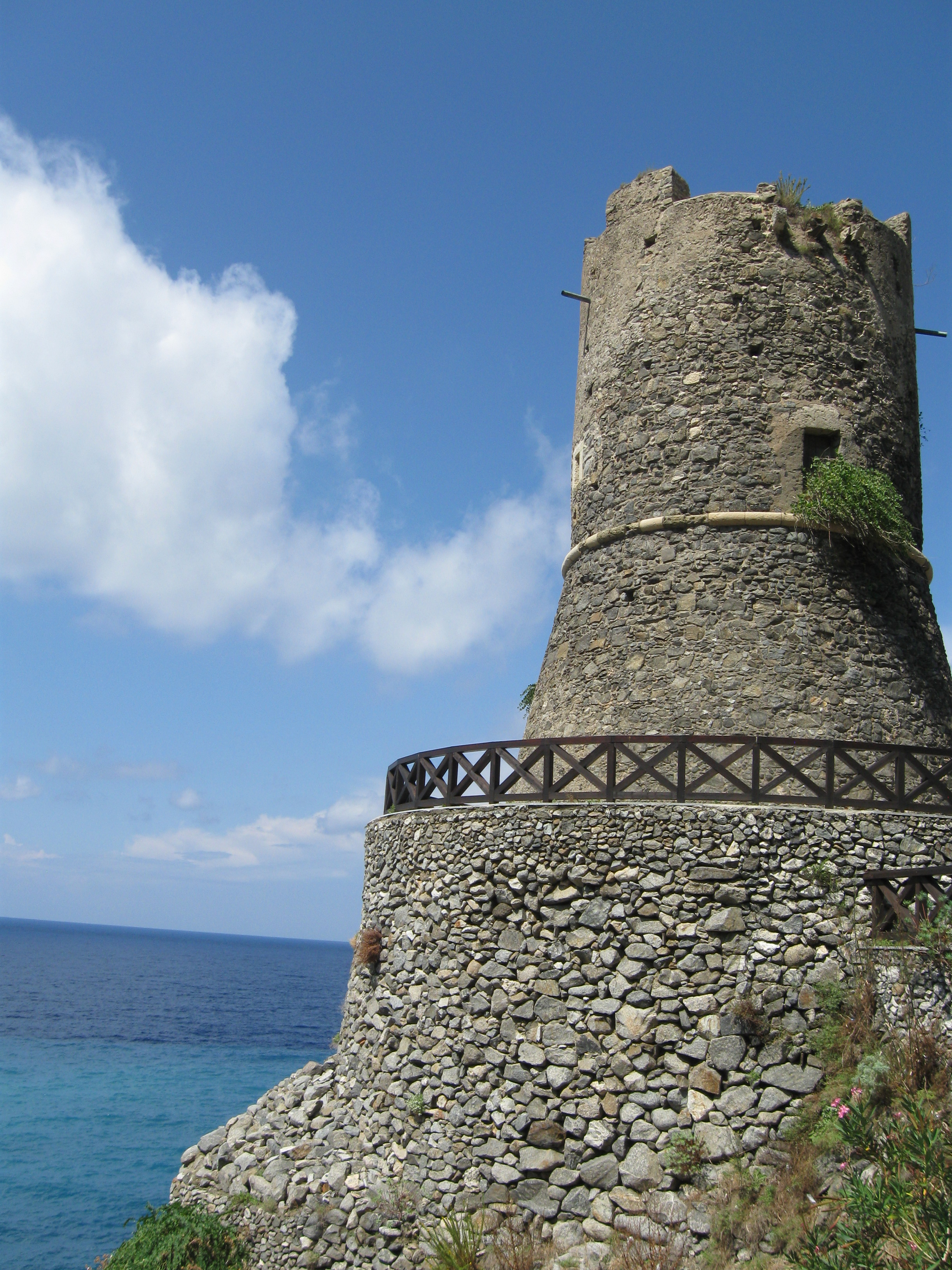
Roger's Tower

- The Aragonese Tower or Capo Rocchi Tower, locally known as Roger's Tower, was built in the 15th and 16th centuries.

It is located in the historic fishermen district known as Marinella. In ancient times the Tower was known as the "32nd Tower of the Calabria Ulterior". It was built as a part of a military system of several watchtowers to guard against the incursions of Saracens along the Tyrrhenian coast.

- Bridge of Caravilla -built on 1825- is a monumental stone bridge, which is notably passing thrice.

This Bridge is famous for a distinctive trait. It is probably the only one in Italy (perhaps on the World), since the same road cross the same bridge (passing down to two arches and turning up the bridge) three times. It is a part of Strada statale 18 Tirrena Inferiore. After being blown up by German mines on 4 September 1943, the bridge was rebuilt in 1943 by the Allies with the cooperation of the women of Bagnara Calabra.

- Fonte Garibaldi

A popular legend relate that Garibaldi stopped twice to drink water on the same fountain. A Palladian style fountain was edificated on 1866 in order to remember Garibaldi in Bagnara.

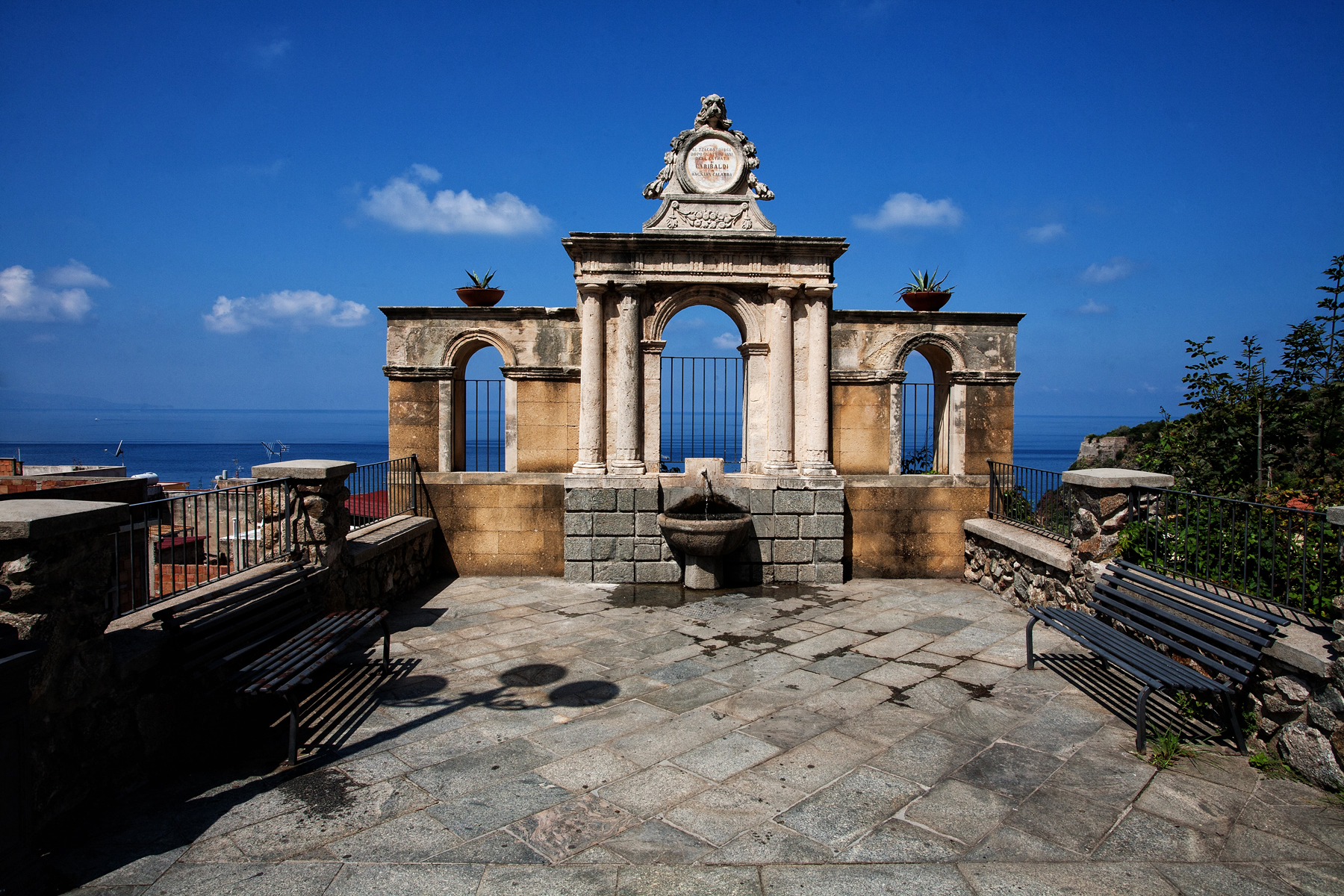
Fonte Garibaldi

- Audere Semper

In the central square of the village is located a marble monument to remember Vincenzo Fondacaro. It is a marmoreal representation of the legendary "Leone di Caprera", a small 9 meter boat which on 1880-1881 Fondacaro and his crew recorded a brave endeavour crossing the Atlantic Ocean.

== Geography ==
Bagnara Calabra borders the Tyrrhenian Sea on the west. It is located by a bay, embraced by overhanging hills which extend to the cliffs down to the sea, within a Calabrian coastal area known as the "Violet Coast".

Bagnara looks out on north-east Sicily, across the Strait of Messina. The Aeolian Islands can be seen to the west across the Tyrrhenian Sea.

The municipality of Bagnara Calabra contains territorial subdivisions, mainly localities (frazioni), such as Ceramida, Solano, and Pellegrina.

Bagnara Calabra borders the following municipalities: Melicuccà, Sant'Eufemia d'Aspromonte, Scilla, and Seminara.

== Demographics ==
Historical population

Year	Pop.	±%
1861	8,494	—
1871	8,630	+1.6%
1881	9,526	+10.4%
1901	11,136	+16.9%
1911	11,279	+1.3%
1921	11,717	+3.9%
1931	12,421	+6.0%
1936	12,574	+1.2%

Year	Pop.	±%
1951	12,976	+3.2%
1961	12,697	−2.2%
1971	11,793	−7.1%
1981	11,194	−5.1%
1991	11,048	−1.3%
2001	11,230	+1.6%
2011	10,622	−5.4%
2021	9,373	−11.8%

Source: ISTAT

== Economy ==
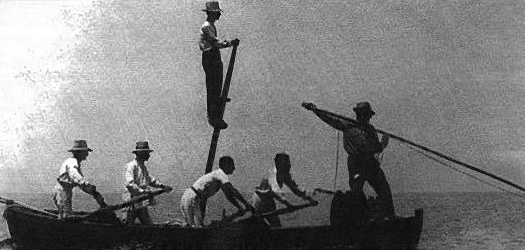
Traditional swordfish fishery at Bagnara

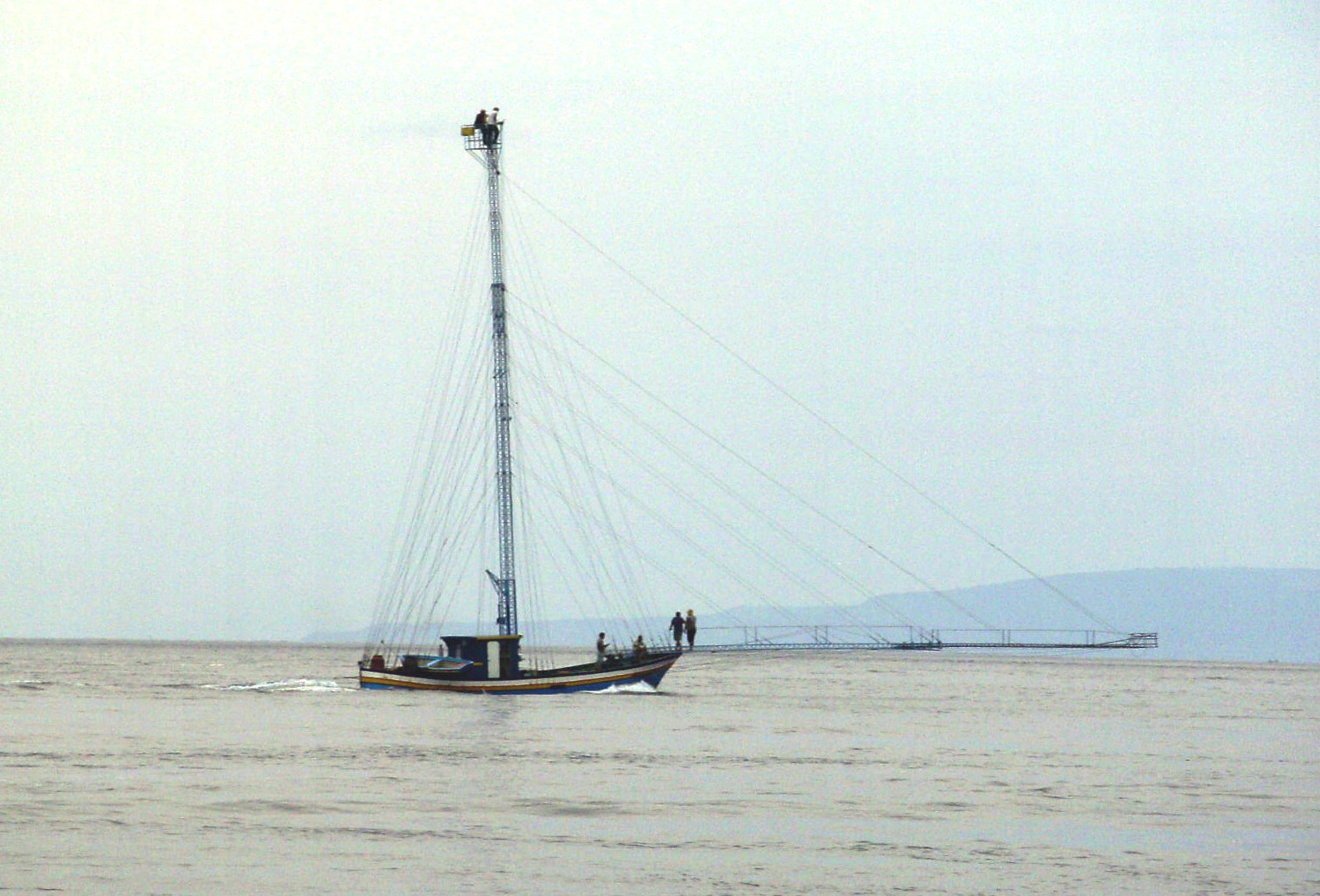
A felucca used in the Strait of Messina

Bagnara is known in Calabria and Italy as the maincenter of production of a torrone which it has awarded with the quality brand of "I.G.P.". But overall the village is known for the way of fishing for swordfish, with a boat known as felucca or passerella, where the fisherman hunts the swordfish with a harpoon. Between 1950 and 1970 the boats were modified with engines, but previously the fishermen used sails. Before 1950 this kind of swordfish fishing boat was made by hand.

Bagnara has traditionally been a fishing and agriculture center, with several terraces converted to vineyards for the cultivation of wine grapes. It was a highly esteemed area of Zibibbo vineyards. This farming has been lost because of emigration.

It is also a tourist center in the summer, and even in other seasons Bagnara has become a location for flying paragliders

- Railway station -

- Ferrovie dello Stato Italiane

- Highway -

- A2 Salerno-Reggio motorway.
- Strada statale 18 Tirrena Inferiore

== People ==
- Vincenzo Fondacaro (Bagnara 3 March 1844 – Atlantic Ocean October 1893), sailor, navy captain, officer of Merchant Royal
- Mia Martini (1947–1995), singer and songwriter
- Loredana Bertè (born 1950), singer and songwriter
- Benito Carbone (born 1971), football player
- Domenico Maceri (born 1952), Italian-American Journalist
- Susy&Co.
