= Altolia =

Altolia Αλτόλια
- Frazione
- Location of Altolia in Italy
- Coordinates: 38°05′N 15°27′E
- Country: Italy
- Region: Sicily
- Province: Messina
- Comune: Messina
- Elevation: 282 m (925 ft)

Population (2019)
  - Total: 180
- Demonym: Altoliesi
- Time zone: UTC+1 (CET)
  - Summer (DST): UTC+2 (CEST)
- Dialing code: 090
- Patron saint: Saint Biagio
- Saint day: last Sunday in July
- Website: Official website

Altolia is a village of Messina district in northeast of Sicily, southern Italy. It stands at an elevation of 282 metres (925 ft) above sea level. At the time of the Istat census of 2021 it had less than 180 inhabitants.

== Physical geography ==
The village is located on the border with the municipality of Scaletta Zanclea and Itala, on the high hills overlooking the valley of the Giampilieri stream.

After the devastating flood that struck several hamlets in southern Messina in 2009, a slow landslide from a rocky ridge persisted in Altolia. This has endangered the safety of residents for over a decade, especially during persistent rains.

Since 2019, a satellite system has been monitoring the slow landslides on the rocky slopes overlooking the village of Altolia. Thanks to the latest technology, all the information needed to plan a successful intervention can now be acquired.

At the beginning of 2026, the Municipal Council approved measures to secure the landslide-prone slope with a total investment of €5 million, which includes a two-tiered strategy and then final consolidation.

== History ==
At the time of the Norman domination, Altolia became a fief of the Chiaromonte (XII century), whose territory extended to the sea, as the hamlets of Giampilieri and Molino did not yet exist. During the anti-Spanish revolt of Messina of 1674–78, Altolia sided with the Spaniards, also due to the proximity of the fief of Scaletta, whose prince Ruffo was an ally of the latter. During the four years of struggle, the houses and districts of the valley were repeatedly looted and burned, now by the Spaniards and now by the French. In 1678, at the end of the revolt, despite the support given by the Altoliesi to the Spaniards for the achievement of victory, the lands of the valley between Altolia, Molino a Giampilieri were confiscated and put up for sale. Francesco Piccinini bought them on behalf of Don Placido Ruffo, prince of Scaletta and of Floresta, who thus also became "Baron of Artalìa, Molino and Giampilieri". However, in 1727 the land was expropriated and returned by the royal state property. The plague that devastated Messina in 1743 did not affect the village. The various earthquakes that occurred in Messina in 1783, 1854 and 1908 did not particularly damage the town, except for the collapse of the wooden ceiling of the Mother Church. In 1940 the provincial road was built that from Giampilieri Marina leads to the village, passing through Giampilieri Superiore and Molino, replacing the old mule track which along the stream bed reached Altolia.

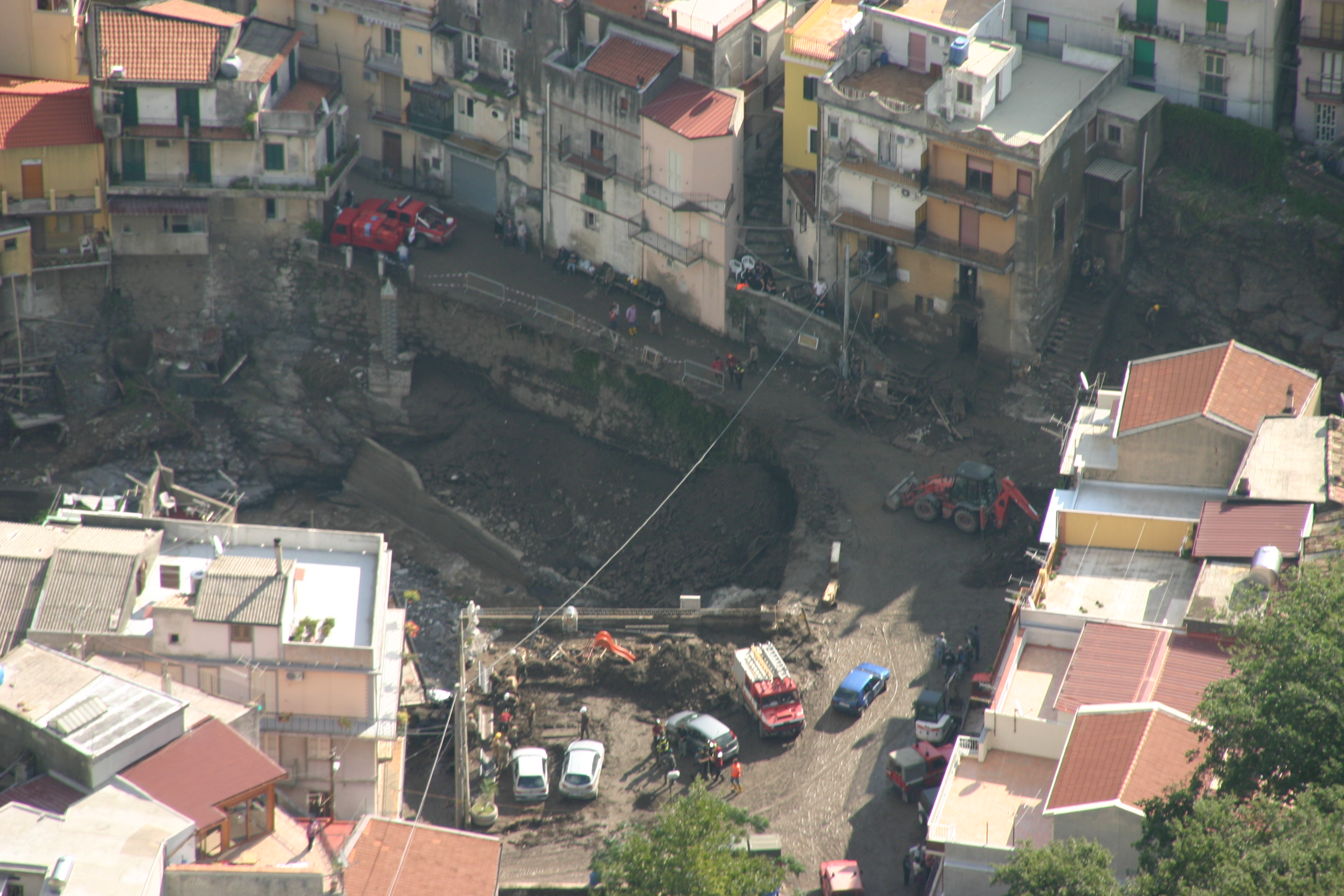
The chasm opened in the hamlet

On 1 October 2009 it jumped to the headlines for the flood and the landslide, which cost 37 victims together with Giampilieri Superiore, Giampilieri Marina, Molino, Briga Marina, Briga Superiore and Scaletta Zanclea.

Since 2019, a satellite system has been monitoring the slow landslides on the rocky slopes, overlooking the village of Altolia, which has been putting the safety of residents at risk for ten years, especially during persistent rains. Thanks to the most modern technologies, all the elements necessary to plan a decisive intervention can now be acquired.

== Infrastructure and public transport ==
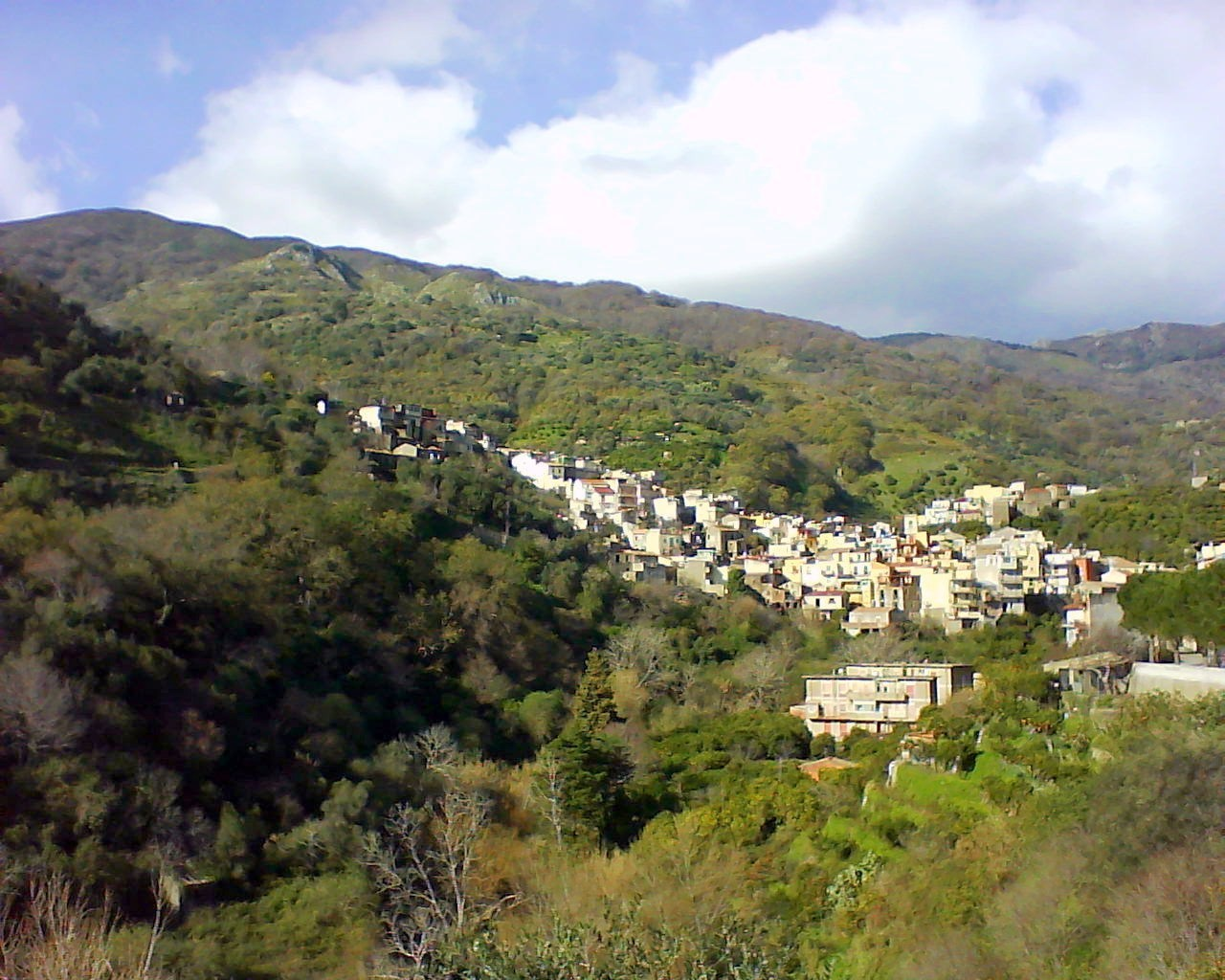
Panoramic view

The village of Altolia can be reached via the provincial road 33 of Altolia which, starting from the Giampilieri Marina junction, crosses Giampilieri Superiore and, passing through the Molino junction, finally reaches the village. The minor viability is represented by alleys and stairways.

Altolia is connected to the city center by two ATM bus lines: shuttle line n ° 2 (Altolia - Giampilieri Railway Station - Briga superiore - Terminal ZIR) and line n ° 1 Shuttle 100 (Giampilieri superiore - Central Railway Station - Torre Faro).

== Culture ==
=== Events ===
- Last Sunday of July: Celebrations of San Biagio, patron saint

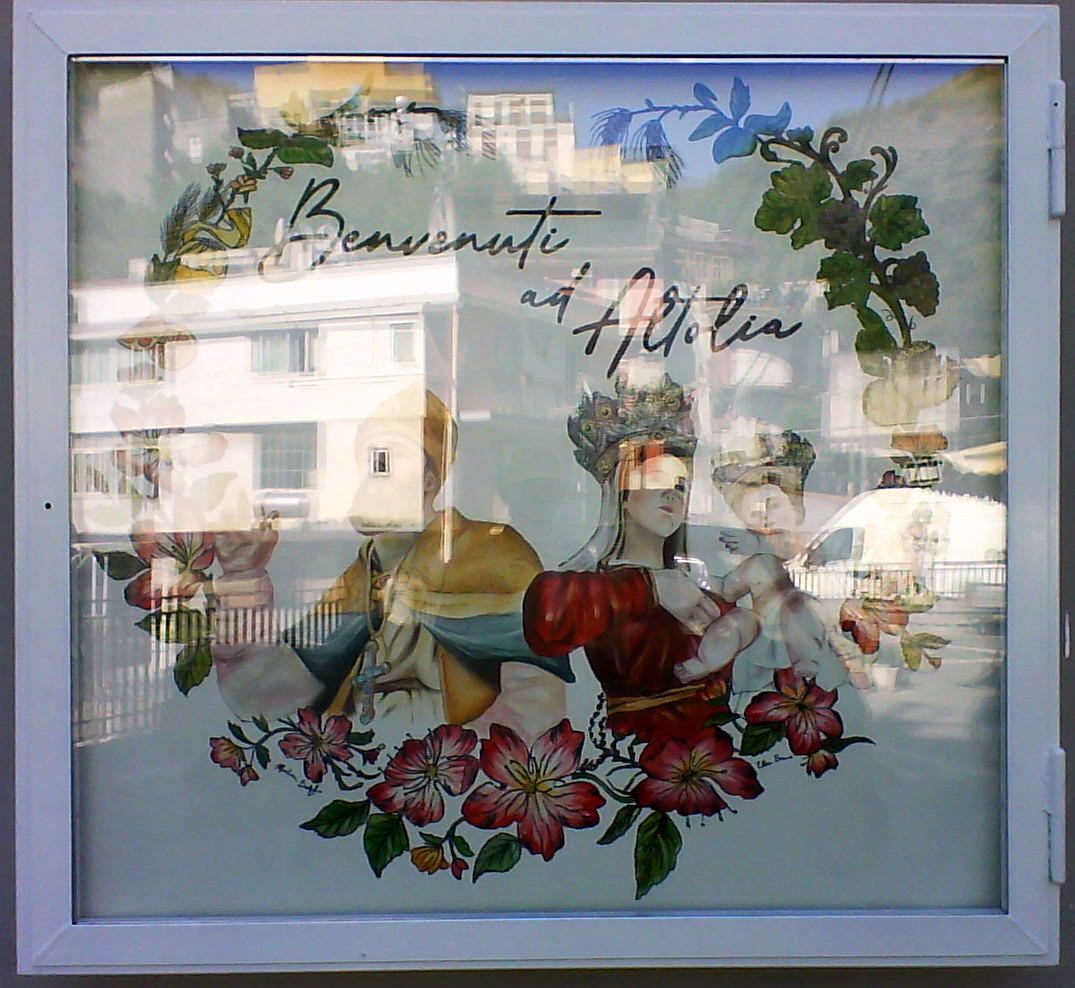
welcome to Altolia

- Last weekend of October: “Profumi d'autunno” an event dedicated to the flavors, traditions, crafts of the area and hiking among the centuries-old chestnut trees;

=== Excursions ===
Occasionally, excursions are organized with expert guides to Pizzo Pietralunga at 790 m (2,590 ft) above sea level. The route is characterized by dense chestnut woods, centuries-old terraces and panoramic windows overlooking the strait. The panorama that embraces the villages of Altolia, Scaletta and Itala is fabulous. In fact, the summit is located exactly on the watershed of three valleys. Downhill there are numerous “dammusi”, ancient millstones with a dome or barrel shaped roof. In some, the pressing tank, the must collection tank and the opening from which the grapes were poured are still visible.

== See also ==
- 2009 northeastern Sicily floods and mudslides
