= Molino, Messina =

Molino Μολίνο
- Frazione
- Location of Molino in Italy
- Coordinates: 38°04′N 15°27′E
- Country: Italy
- Region: Sicily
- Province: Messina
- Comune: Messina
- Elevation: 222 m (728 ft)

Population (2001)
  - Total: 212
- Demonym: Molinesi
- Time zone: UTC+1 (CET)
  - Summer (DST): UTC+2 (CEST)
- Dialing code: 090
- Patron saint: Saint Mary
- Saint day: August 2
- Website: Official website

Molino is a frazione of the comune of Messina in the Province of Messina, Sicily, southern Italy. It stands at an elevation of 222 metres above sea level. At the time of the Istat census of 2001 it had 212 inhabitants.

== See also ==
- 2009 northeastern Sicily floods and mudslides
