= Santa Cristina d'Aspromonte =

Santa Cristina d'Aspromonte Αγία Χριστίνα (Greek)
- Comune
- Comune di Santa Cristina d'Aspromonte
- Location within Italy Location within Calabria
- Coordinates: 38°15′N 15°58′E
- Country: Italy
- Region: Calabria
- Metropolitan city: Reggio Calabria (RC)

Area
  - Total: 23.1 km^{2} (8.9 sq mi)

Population (Dec. 2004)
  - Total: 1,086
  - Density: 47.0/km^{2} (122/sq mi)
- Time zone: UTC+1 (CET)
  - Summer (DST): UTC+2 (CEST)
- Postal code: 89056
- Dialing code: 0966

Santa Cristina d'Aspromonte is a comune in the Province of Reggio Calabria in the Italian region Calabria, located about 90 kilometres (56 mi) southwest of Catanzaro and about 30 kilometres (19 mi) northeast of Reggio Calabria. As of 31 December 2004, it had a population of 1,086 and an area of 23.1 square kilometres (8.9 mi^{2}). In 2022 there is less than 600.

Santa Cristina d'Aspromonte borders the following municipalities: Careri, Cosoleto, Oppido Mamertina, Platì, San Luca, Scido.

== Demographic evolution ==
Historical population

Year	Pop.	±%
1861	1,500	—
1871	1,854	+23.6%
1881	2,095	+13.0%
1901	2,259	+7.8%
1911	2,407	+6.6%

Year	Pop.	±%
1921	2,099	−12.8%
1931	2,804	+33.6%
1936	2,878	+2.6%
1951	3,125	+8.6%
1961	2,408	−22.9%

Year	Pop.	±%
1971	1,653	−31.4%
1981	1,297	−21.5%
1991	1,168	−9.9%
2001	1,095	−6.2%

Source: Data from ISTAT

== Notable people ==
- Mimmo Politanò (born 1958), singer-songwriter, writer, painter and radio host
