= Domenico Gnoli =

Domenico Gnoli may refer to:

- Domenico Gnoli (author) (1838–1915), Italian author
- Domenico Gnoli (painter) (1933–1970), Italian painter and stage designer
