= Vincenzo Fondacaro =

Italian captain

Vincenzo Fondacaro (3 March 1844 – 1893) was an Italian captain who crossed the Atlantic Ocean from Montevideo, Uruguay to Las Palmas, Spain on a boat that he made himself.

== Early life ==
Fondacaro was born in Bagnara Calabra from a working-class family. He started his career by joining the merchant navy. After working in the field for fifteen years, Fondacaro was promoted to Navy Officer Captain in the Royal Navy of Italy on 24 May 1876.

== Voyages ==
Following the Battle of Lissa, Fondacaro longed to cross the Atlantic Ocean from Montevideo to Las Palmas on a boat designed by him. The boat, called "Leone di Caprera" in honour of Giuseppe Garibaldi, measured approximately 9m x 2.30m x 1.60m and weighed 3 tonnes. Fondacaro's crew included Pietro Zoccoli and Orlando Grassoni. On 19 September 1880 the "Leone di Caprera" set off from Montevideo. On 10 February 1881, the crew reached Castello di Farro. On 26 May 1881, the boat was towed to Livorno by an English vessel. Today, the "Leone di Caprera" can still be seen at the Museo Nazionale Scienza e Tecnologia Leonardo da Vinci in Milan.

On 30 May 1893, Fondacaro crossed the Atlantic again in a boat named "Cesare Cantù". This journey took him from Buenos Aires to Chicago. Fondacaro took Vincenzo Galasso, Vincenzo Sciplini, and Vincenzo Carrisi on the trip with him, forming the crew. When they arrived in Chicago, bystanders reportedly greeted them with a standing ovation. However, when they attempted to return to Buenos Aires, Fondacaro and his crew disappeared in the Atlantic Ocean.
