= Mimmo Politanò =

Italian singer-songwriter

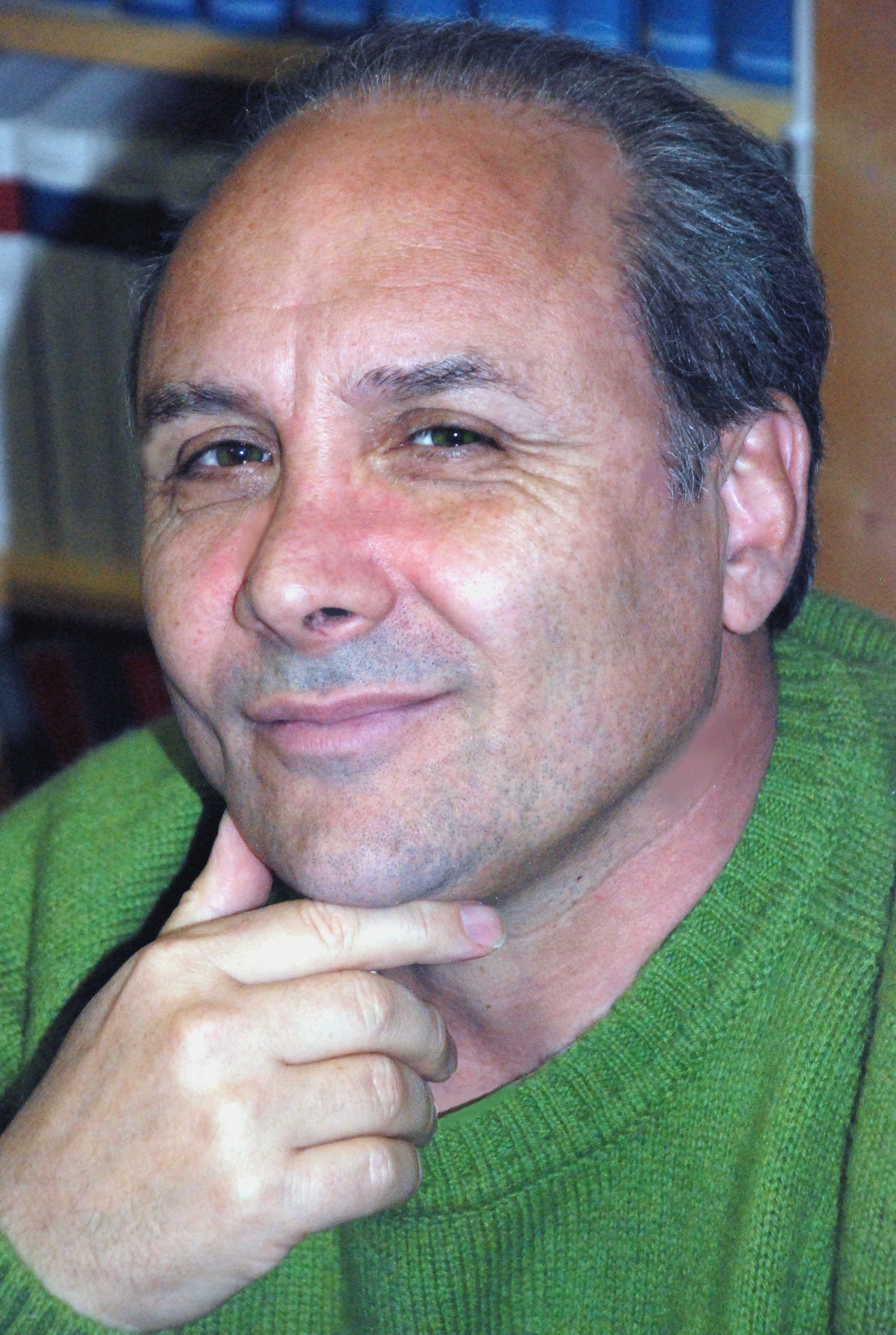
- Mimmo Politanò
- Born: Domenico Politanò; 29 November 1958 (age 67); Santa Cristina d'Aspromonte, Italy
- Education: Arts High School, Accademia di Belle Arti di Roma, Rome
- Known for: Writer, painter, songwriter, lyricist,
- Movement: contemporary art
- Website: www.mimmopolitano.it

Domenico "Mimmo" Politanò (born 29 November 1958) is an Italian singer-songwriter, writer, painter and radio host.

== Biography ==
Graduated in Italian studies, history, science and techniques of music and entertainment, he was one of the pioneers of Italian private radio and TV, from 1976 with the first private radios in Milan, he became the author of words and music with it:Edizioni musicali Curci, he moved to Rome at the end of 1976, where he was artistic director and presenter of Radio Onda Sonora, he works with Radio Onda Sabina, Mondo Radio and with Radio Gabbiano Verde in Nicotera, various radio-TV stations in Argentina. He works in the first Roman TV stations, such as PTS and it:GBR (rete televisiva), he became the artistic director of Telestudio 61 in Rome and Reggio Calabria, from 1977 to 1981 to then devote himself completely to music and singing.

He has written and translated musical texts for Spanish versions for artists such as Domenico Modugno, Edoardo Bennato, Toto Cutugno, Nicola di Bari, Fred Bongusto, Iva Zanicchi, Mino Reitano, Mietta, Nek, Amedeo Minghi, and words in Italian for Gino Santercole, Alex Damiani, Memo Remigi, Gino Santercole, Gianni Nazzaro and Tony Malco. He has translated texts by Mogol set to music by Gianni Bella; sung by Sonia Rivas.

In Rai, on Uno Mattina, in programs from Mexico, during the Mundial 86, he performs together with Placido Domingo, Mirelle Mathieu, Silvy Vartan, Riccardo Cocciante, Gianni Morandi, Gino Paoli, Emanuel, Susana Rinaldi, directed by Beppe Vesicchio. In 1988 he participated in Rai Uno, "Per fare mezzanotte" with Gigi Marzullo and Fred Bongusto; on Rai Uno, "The pleasure of summer". Receives the "Navicella Award", for the song Afghanistan. In 1989 he was in the final at the San Remo Festival in the emerging category. Music by exclusive invitation the poems of Pope John Paul II. Our land, by Wojtyla-Politanò, was engraved in 1998 by I Cugini di Campagna, who had already recorded Nabai, by Politanò-Michetti in 1997, dedicated to the difficult conditions of Somali children in particular and to all children who suffer in general. In 1999, Mexican singer Jan recorded his song, Caress Me My Soul, for Universal, and brought it to success in Mexico and South America.

Since 2000 he has conducted the program Accarezzami l'anima, with the radio and TV station, Radio Radio, the soul together with the journalist Ileana Linari.

== Discography ==
- Angel "Pocho" Gatti – Argentina ... Te Recuerdo (LP, Album), 1979.
- Volveras (LP, Album), 1982.
- Politanò (LP, Album).
- Implosione (LP, Album, Promo), 1985.

== See also ==
- Piero Pintucci
- it:Marco Rancati
- it:Angel Pocho Gatti
- Gino Santercole

== Bibliography ==
- L'anima di Giulietta, by Domenico Politanò, 2020.ISBN 979-86-7992-217-4.
- Lo Sguardo la Mirada, Sonetti, Canzoni, Madrigali, by Domenico Politanò, Edizioni Universitalia, 2012.ISBN 978-88-6507-278-3.
- La voce di Karol, by Roberto Allegri, Mimmo Politanò, 2013.
