= 2009 Messina floods and mudslides =

Natural disasters in Italy

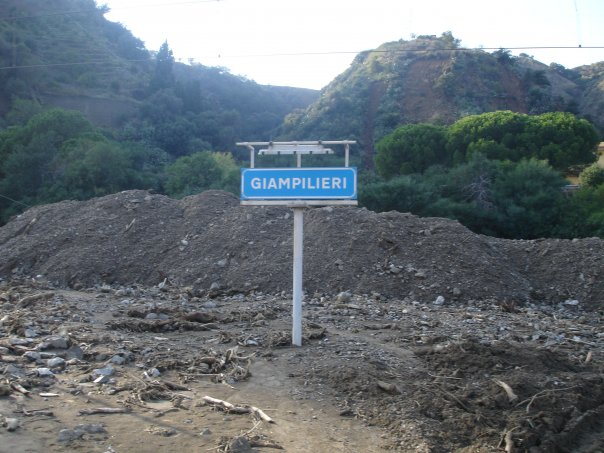
- Giampilieri after the mudslide

Meteorological history
- Duration: 1–2 October 2009

Overall effects
- Fatalities: At least 31 deaths 6 missing
- Injuries: 95
- Areas affected: Messina (Giampilieri Superiore, Altolia, Briga Superiore and Molino); Scaletta Zanclea

The 2009 Messina floods and mudslides occurred in Sicily on the night of 1–2 October, mainly along the Ionian coast in the Province of Messina. They also affected other parts of northeastern Sicily and killed a total of at least 31 people, some of whom were swept out to sea. More than 400 people were left homeless, as many houses collapsed.

The places which suffered the most damage were Giampilieri Superiore, a small frazione 10 km (6 miles) south of the city of Messina, which was buried in mud; the comune of Scaletta Zanclea and the two frazione of Altolia, Briga Superiore.

To avoid casualties, when the Messina region received heavy rains in February 2010, the government evacuated one-third of the population most at risk. A mudslide caused property damage, but no casualties.

== Storm and mudslide ==
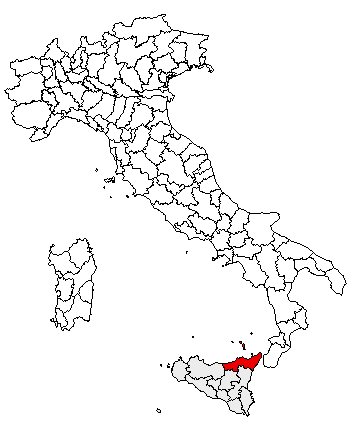
Sicily was devastated by extreme weather.

On the night of 1–2 October 2009, a sudden downpour of rain, accompanied by strong winds and lightning, caused large mudslides through the valleys of the northeastern coast. The extreme nature of the weather gave people little time to flee buildings or vehicles; mud rapidly swept down from the surrounding hills and cliffs, clogging the streets of these towns with debris and grime, and carrying away people, cars, and dwellings. Officials reported that 230 mm (9 inches) of rain fell in the space of three hours. In some areas, the mud was 20 m (66 feet) deep.

The slide hit so quickly that rescuers later found many people trapped in cars and dwellings. Rail lines were covered with mud and major roads into the area were blocked. One man was found dead in his automobile, which was submerged in mud and water. Another drowned in the flooded cellar of his country home. A man choked to death after taking in mud in when the main piazza was flooded in a suburb of the city of Messina.

A survivor recounted his escape: "I was driving home when suddenly all this stuff came down on top of me and hit me full on. I managed to climb out of the car. It was a terrible experience". Cars were swept along by the mud. Many buildings collapsed; some were partially submerged by mud, and engulfed by water and debris. Some people were washed away into the Ionian Sea. At least 100 people evacuated their houses following mudslides.

As of 8 October, seven people were still missing, and at least 450 inhabitants of the comuni were left homeless by the extreme weather. 40 wounded people were hospitalised; at least two of these were said to have serious injuries. Messina has been surrounded by mud and standing rainwater. Parts of Sicily were inaccessible for days.

The Italian government declared a state of emergency to mobilize emergency rescue and recovery forces. It was the worst landslide disaster in Italy since 1998 during which 137 people died in Sarno, near Naples. The death toll was expected to rise. The Italian Prime Minister, Silvio Berlusconi, said that it could be as high as fifty.

== Aid ==
Many survivors fled to rooftops, where a helicopter lifted them to safety. The first batch of evacuees escaped aboard boats; they were taken to the mainland or safe areas by rescue helicopters. Emergency crews dug through mud and used search dogs in an effort to find survivors. The mud covered roads and disrupted assistance efforts, as many rescue crews had to enter areas on foot. Medical teams were rushed to the scene. Bulldozers were also deployed.

One rescue worker described it as "hell". Many survivors sought refuge in a convent. The railway line connecting Messina to the resort town of Taormina was blocked by debris and mud.

Damage extended to the capital Palermo, where a hospital was partially flooded, and people were found trapped in their vehicles.

Giampilieri Superiore, a small frazione 10 km (6 miles) south of the city of Messina, was totally buried in mud; the comune of Scaletta Zanclea; and the frazione of Briga Superiore also suffered extensive, irreparable damage.

== Reactions ==
An investigation into the "culpable disaster" was quickly underway. The origins of this environmental disaster are believed to result from a lack of forestation in the hills and lower valleys, caused by annual summer brushfires. In addition, according to Guido Bertolaso, director of the Italian Civil Protection Service, illegal construction without permits and in defiance of zoning regulations is widespread in Sicily; many lost homes were built illegally too close to or blocking known torrent beds, creating drainage problems.

Residents accused the local administration for having failed to secure the nearby hills from the risk of landslides, following mudslides that occurred in October 2007. These had caused property damage but no casualties.

President Giorgio Napolitano said: "We need a serious investment plan to increase safety – rather than grandiose public works – in this part of the country, or else tragedies like this one will happen again".

== Aftermath ==
As of 4 October, many bodies still have not been recovered from the mud and debris. Some of the victims were small children. Silvio Berlusconi visited the afflicted areas on 4 October and met with some of the people left homeless by the disaster. The scenes have been described by a Rai Uno news reporter as "apocalyptic". As of 6 October, Director of the Civil Defence Guido Bertolaso amended the number of missing people from 37 to nine. Officials thought some bodies of victims might never be recovered.

On 10 October 2009, a state funeral was held for the victims at the Cathedral of Messina. It was televised so that the nation could bear witness.

When heavy rains struck the region of Messina in February 2010, the government evacuated one-third of the population most at risk by 14 February. A large mudslide destroyed some houses, but caused no casualties.

== Images ==
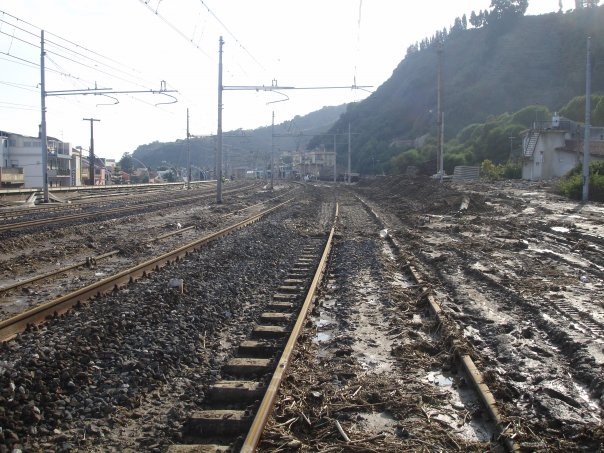
Train station in Giampilieri

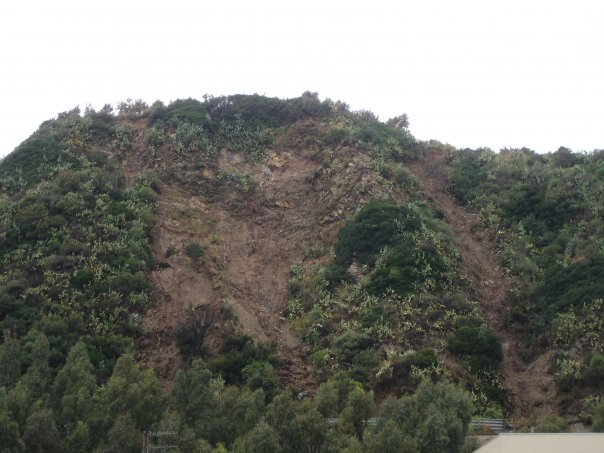
One of the hills after the mudslide

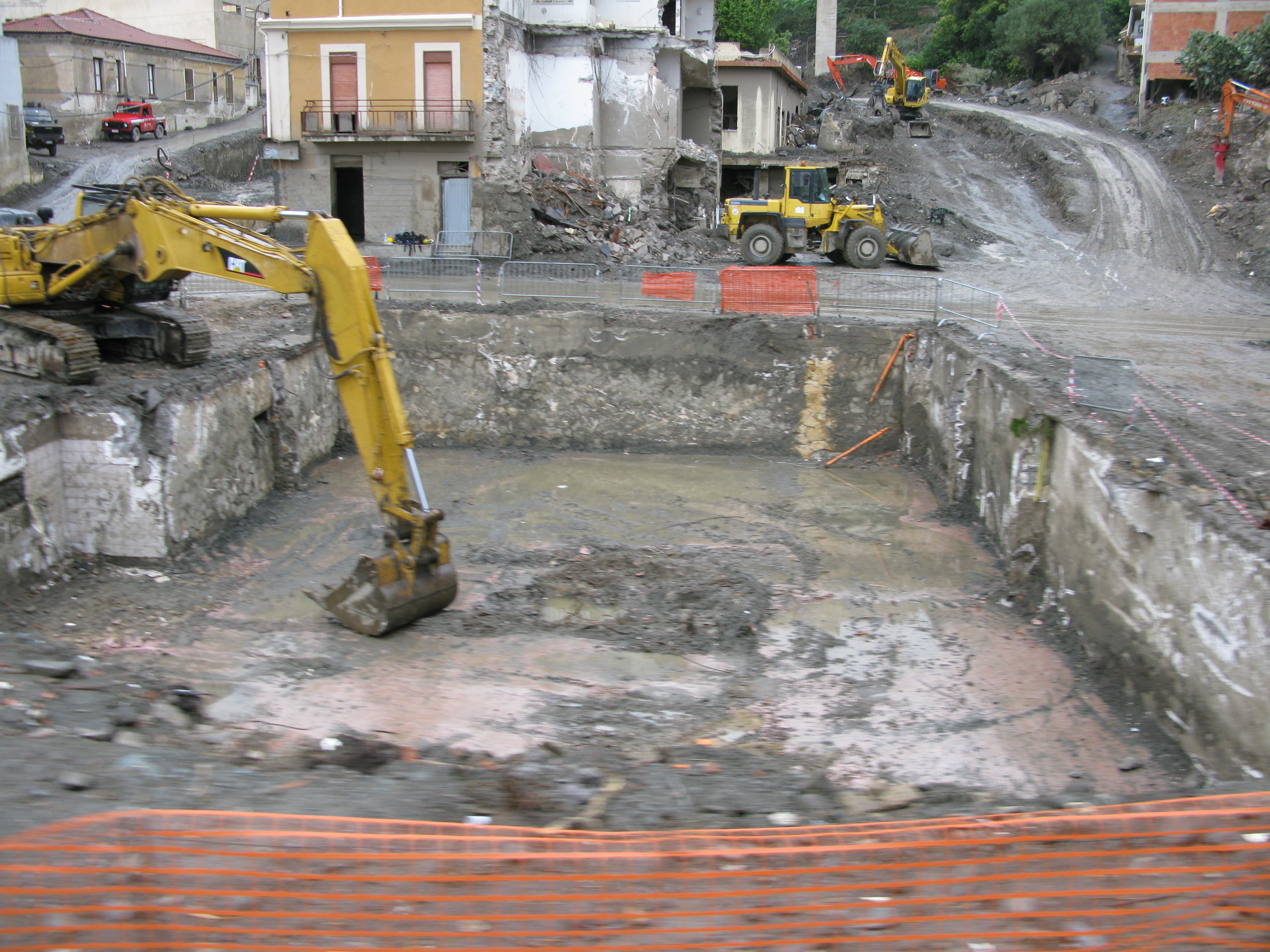
Between Scaletta Zanclea and Giampilieri Marina, on 15 October

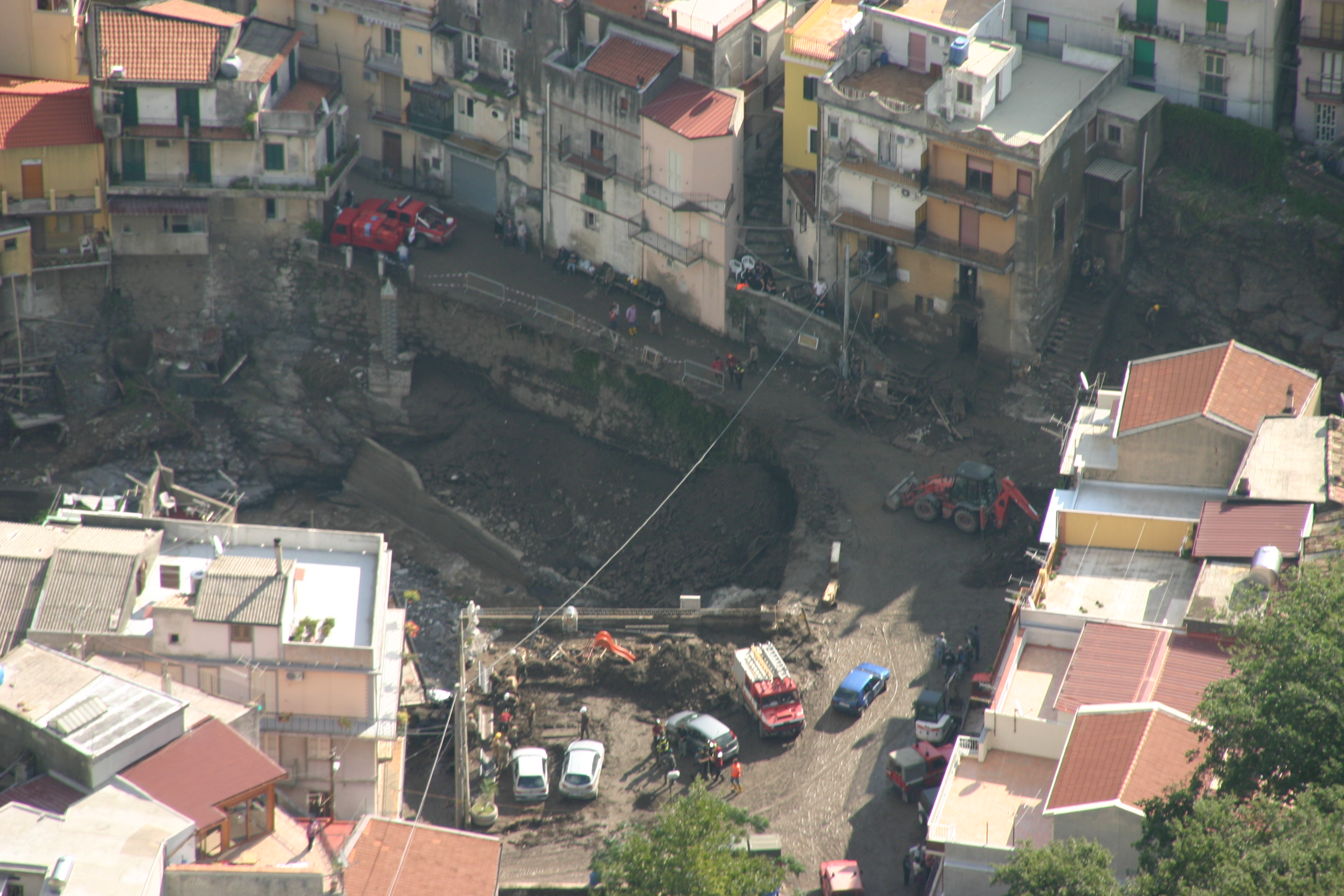
Chasm opened in Altolia

== See also ==
- 2009 Brazilian floods and mudslides
- 2009 Salvador floods and mudslides
