= Sinopoli =

Sinopoli Σινόπολις, Ξενόπολις (Greek)
- Comune
- Comune di Sinopoli
- Location within Italy Location within Calabria
- Coordinates: 38°15′N 15°56′E
- Country: Italy
- Region: Calabria
- Metropolitan city: Reggio Calabria (RC)
- Frazioni: sinopoli inferiore, sinopoli vecchio

Area
  - Total: 25.8 km^{2} (10.0 sq mi)

Population (Dec. 2004)
  - Total: 2,303
  - Density: 89.3/km^{2} (231/sq mi)
- Time zone: UTC+1 (CET)
  - Summer (DST): UTC+2 (CEST)
- Postal code: 89020
- Dialing code: 0966

Sinopoli (Italian pronunciation: [siˈnɔːpoli]; Calabrian Greek: Σινόπολις, Ξενόπολις) is a comune (municipality) in the Province of Reggio Calabria in the Italian region Calabria, located about 90 km (56 mi) southwest of Catanzaro and about 30 km (19 mi) northeast of Reggio Calabria. As of 31 December 2004, it had a population of 2,303 and an area of 25.8 km^{2} (10.0 sq mi).

The municipality of Sinopoli contains the frazioni (subdivisions, mainly villages and hamlets) Sinopoli inferiore and Sinopoli vecchio.

Sinopoli borders the following municipalities: Cosoleto, Oppido Mamertina, Roccaforte del Greco, Roghudi, San Procopio, Sant'Eufemia d'Aspromonte, Scilla.

== Demographic evolution ==
Historical population

Year	Pop.	±%
1861	3,192	—
1871	3,380	+5.9%
1881	3,411	+0.9%
1901	3,554	+4.2%
1911	3,802	+7.0%

Year	Pop.	±%
1921	4,009	+5.4%
1931	4,059	+1.2%
1936	4,029	−0.7%
1951	4,404	+9.3%
1961	3,123	−29.1%

Year	Pop.	±%
1971	2,606	−16.6%
1981	2,468	−5.3%
1991	2,535	+2.7%
2001	2,329	−8.1%

Source: Data from ISTAT

== See also ==
- Giuseppe Sinopoli, an Italian conductor and composer
