= Scaletta Zanclea =

Scaletta Zanclea Σκαλέττα Ζάνκλεα (Greek)
- Comune
- Comune di Scaletta Zanclea
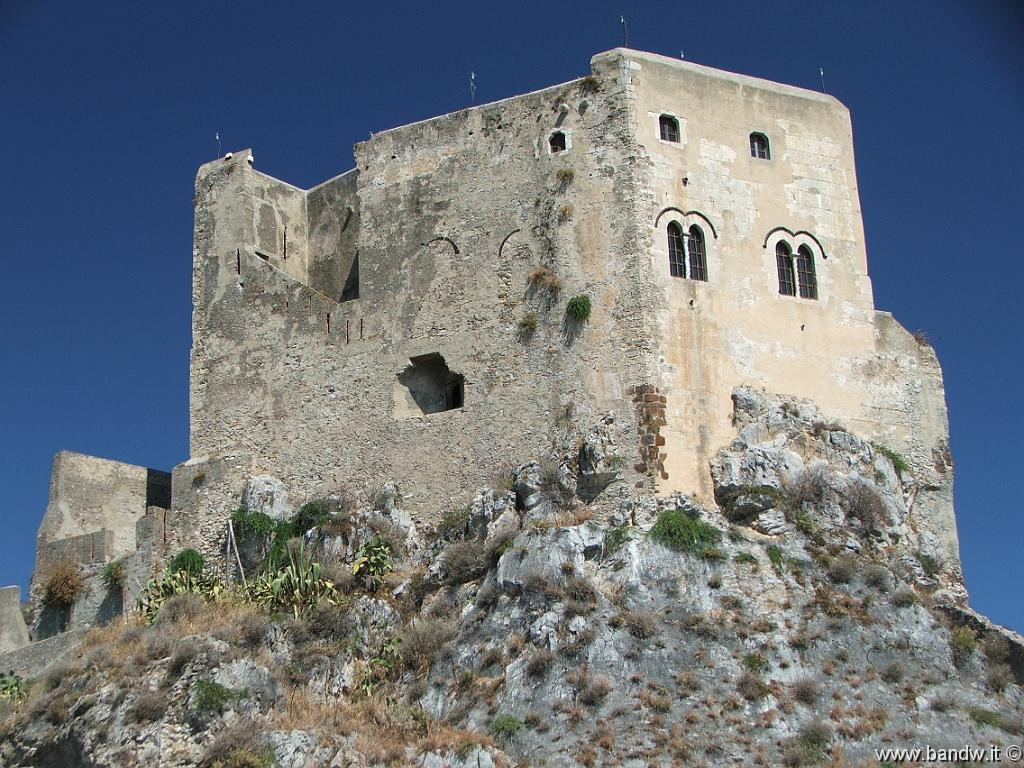
- Castle of Scaletta Zanclea.

- Coat of arms

- Location within Italy Location within Sicily
- Coordinates: 38°3′N 15°28′E
- Country: Italy
- Region: Sicily
- Metropolitan city: Messina (ME)
- Frazioni: Guidomandri Marina, Guidomandri Superiore, Scaletta Superiore

Government
  - Mayor: Gianfranco Moschella

Area
  - Total: 5.0 km^{2} (1.9 sq mi)
- Elevation: 8 m (26 ft)

Population (30 June 2025)
  - Total: 1,861
  - Density: 370/km^{2} (960/sq mi)
- Demonym: Scalettesi
- Time zone: UTC+1 (CET)
  - Summer (DST): UTC+2 (CEST)
- Postal code: 98029
- Dialing code: 090
- Website: Official website

Scaletta Zanclea is a comune (municipality) in the Metropolitan City of Messina in the Italian region Sicily, located about 180 kilometres (110 mi) east of Palermo and about 15 kilometres (9 mi) southwest of Messina.

== Physical geography ==
The municipality acquired its current size in 1986, with the incorporation of the Divieto district of the municipality of Messina. Previously, it had incorporated the municipalities of Guidomandri and Itala in 1928, but the latter was reconstituted in 1947. The town of Scaletta consists of the adjacent villages of Scaletta Marina and Guidomandri Marina, which extend along the Ionian coast without interruption between Capo Scaletta to the north and the town of Itala Marina to the south; further inland are the villages of Guidomandri (superiore) and Scaletta Superiore.

== History ==
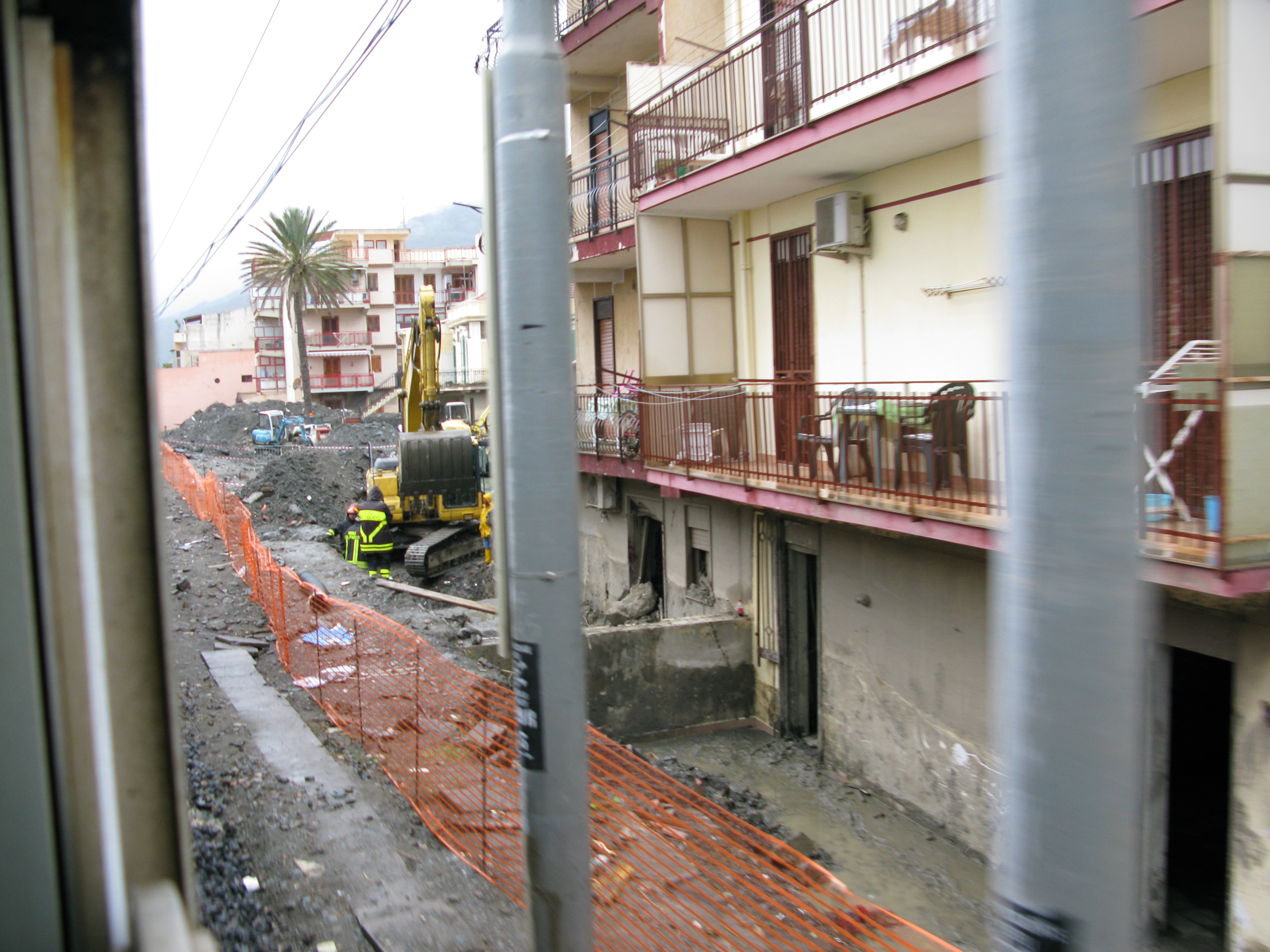
Between Scaletta Zanclea and Giampilieri marina

Scaletta was a fiefdom of the Ruffo Princes, loyal allies of the Spanish. During the anti-Spanish revolt in Messina, it was besieged and conquered by the French shortly after the fall of Taormina. The unscrupulous Macalda di Scaletta (c. 1240-c. 1308), Baroness of Ficarra and wife of Alaimo di Lentini, one of the protagonists of the Sicilian Vespers, was born and spent her early youth in the castle.

=== Contemporary age ===
The comune suffered heavily in the mudslides which devastated the area in 2009. The places which suffered the most damage were Giampilieri Superiore, a small frazione 10 km (6 miles) south of the city of Messina, which was buried in mud, the comune of Scaletta Zanclea, the Giampilieri marina railway station and the two frazione of Altolia, Briga Superiore

== Monuments and places of interest ==
=== Religious architecture ===
- Parish of Santa Maria del Carmelo and San Nicolò: a place of faith and community, where love and spirituality intertwine to nourish the soul and promote unity among people.

=== Military architecture ===
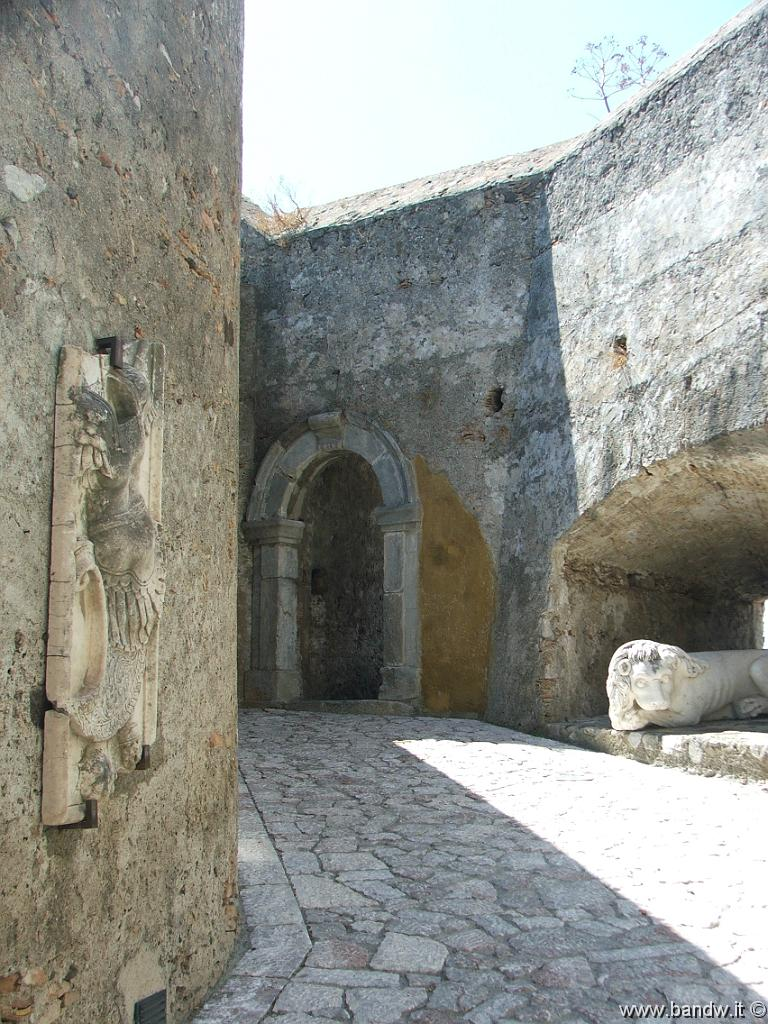
Castle entrance

- Torre Nuova and Scaletta Tower (or "San Placido Battery"), part of the coastal tower circuit of Sicily.
- Scaletta Zanclea Castle: a mighty fortress that belonged to the Ruffo princes. Perched on the highest point of the cliff, whose natural ruggedness it follows, the Castle built by Frederick II of Swabia in the 13th century dominates the surrounding landscape. Some legends surrounding it concern Macalda di Scaletta.
- "The Manor of Hope": a welcoming refuge offering emotional support and practical assistance. A place where hope is ignited, souls embrace, and the community walks together toward a bright future.

== Demographic evolution ==
Historical population

Year	Pop.	±%
1861	2,238	—
1871	2,488	+11.2%
1881	2,565	+3.1%
1901	3,236	+26.2%
1911	3,284	+1.5%
1921	3,224	−1.8%

Year	Pop.	±%
1931	3,368	+4.5%
1936	3,415	+1.4%
1951	3,265	−4.4%
1961	2,982	−8.7%
1971	2,964	−0.6%
1981	2,740	−7.6%

Year	Pop.	±%
1991	2,677	−2.3%
2001	2,578	−3.7%
2011	2,249	−12.8%
2021	1,871	−16.8%

Source: Data from ISTAT

== Culture ==
=== Education ===
- Ethno-Anthropological Museum of Scaletta Zanclea

== Bibliography ==
- Mariarosaria Palmieri (2010). C'era una volta Macalda. Naples: Guida.
- Steven Runciman (1975). I vespri siciliani. Milan: Rizzoli.
