= Yakiimo =

Yakiimo may refer to:

- Roasted sweet potato, a popular street food in East Asia
- JCPM Yakiimo Station, an astronomical observatory station at Shimizu, Japan
