= Nasso =

Nasso may refer to:

== People ==
- Giulio Nasso (1906–1999), American builder
- Julius R. Nasso (born 1952), Italian-American film producer, pharmacologist, and businessman
- Publius Ovidius Nasso, also known as Ovid
- Ray Nasso (born 1987), Australian-Italian rugby player

== Places ==
- Nasso, Italian name of Naxos.

== Other ==
- Nasso or Naso (parashah)
