= Roasted chestnut =

Popular autumn and winter street food

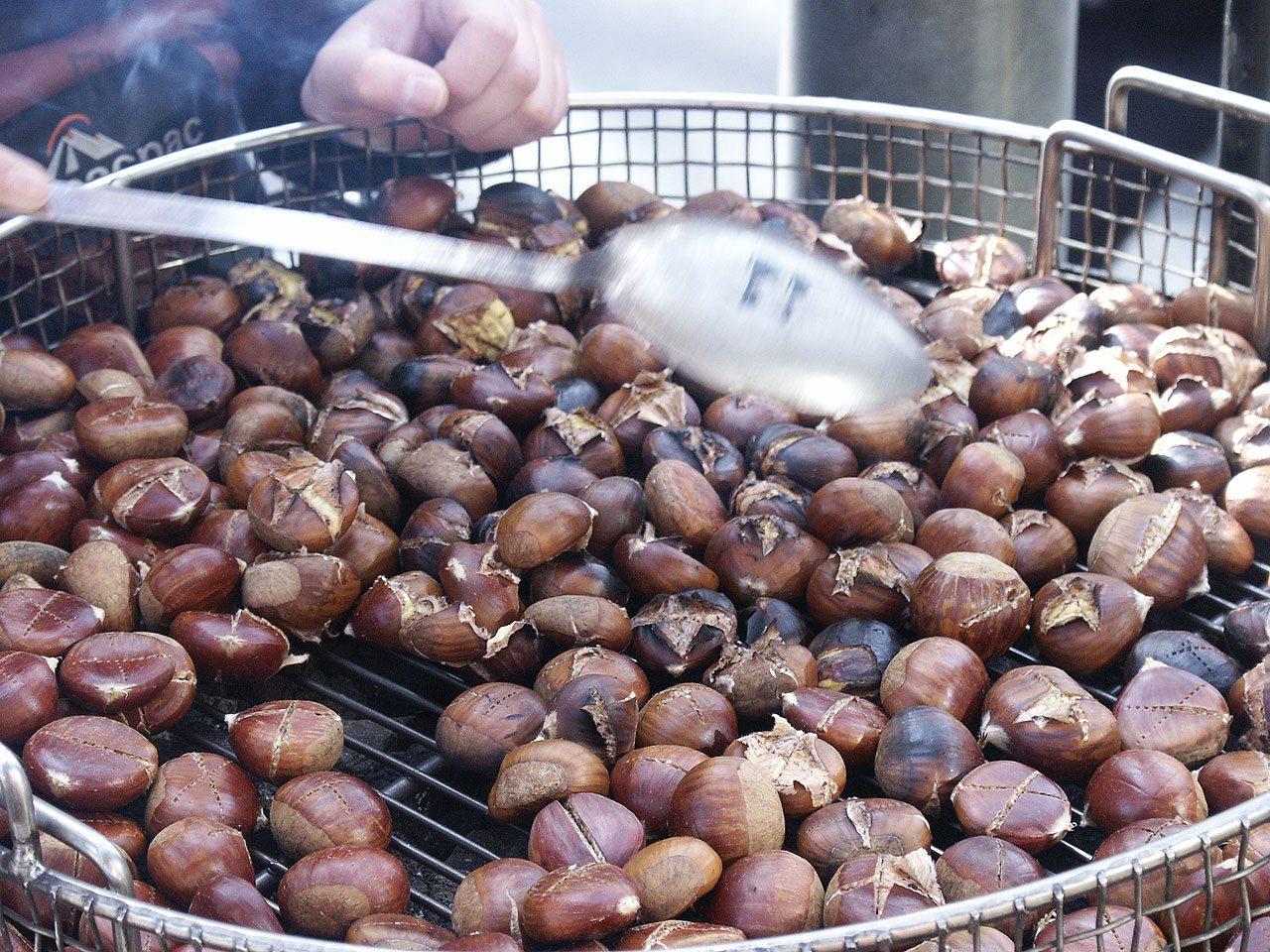
- Alternative names: Castanhas assadas, chǎolìzi, gunbam
- Place of origin: Various
- Main ingredients: Chestnuts
- Similar dishes: Roasted sweet potato

Regional names

Chinese name
- Chinese: 炒栗子
- Literal meaning: "stir-fried chestnut"
Transcriptions
Standard Mandarin
- Hanyu Pinyin: chǎo-lìzi
- Wade–Giles: ch'ao^{3}-li^{4}tsŭ
Yue: Cantonese
- Yale Romanization: cháau-leuhtjí
- Jyutping: caau^{2}-leot^{6}zi^{2}

Korean name
- Hangul: 군밤
- Literal meaning: roasted chestnut
Transcriptions
- Revised Romanization: gunbam
- McCune–Reischauer: kunbam

Portuguese name
- Portuguese: castanhas assadas

Roasted chestnut is a popular autumn and winter street food in East Asia, Europe, New York City and Istanbul. Asian chestnuts (Castanea crenata, C. mollissima) as well as European chestnuts (C. sativa) can be used.

== Asia ==
=== China ===
In China, chǎolìzi (炒栗子; "stir-fried chestnut") is a popular autumn street food. Because they are roasted with sand and sweet syrup, they are also called tángchǎolìzi (糖炒栗子; "sugar stir-fried chestnut").

=== Korea ===
Gunbam (군밤; "roasted chestnut") is a popular street food in both North and South Korea. The food is sold from late autumn to winter by the vendors wearing ushanka, which is sometimes referred to as "roasted chestnut vendor hat" or "roasted sweet potato vendor hat". A popular folk song called Gunbam taryeong (군밤타령; "ballad of roasted chestnuts") was composed by Jeon Su-rin in 1932, and has been sung since, being one of the songs commonly taught in public schools in South Korea.

== Europe ==
=== Austria ===
The Maronistand is a small booth where a street vendor offers roasted Maroni ("edible chestnuts" in local German) and potato-based hot snacks cooked in and on portable metal drums. Such outlets appear in the colder seasons and are a common sight at, for example, Viennese Christmas markets.

=== France ===
In France, marrons chauds ("hot chestnuts") are a well known autumn street food. In Paris, many street sellers come from India, and use improvised stands with shopping carts and cans.

In Corsica roasted chestnuts are known as fasgiole in Corsican language.

=== Italy ===
In Italy roasted chestnuts are most commonly known as caldarroste. They are very popular especially in mountainous areas of the country, such as the Apennines and the Alps where the chestnut grows in abundance. Chestnuts and roasted chestnuts can be found in numerous festivals throughout Italy, usually organized between the end of October and the beginning of November.

Roasted chestnuts are also known by various other names in different parts of Italy:

- Basturnòn - Apennines of Piacenza
- Biröll, Biroeull - Province of Como and Province of Milan
- Boröla - Province of Bergamo
- Braschèe, Mundee - North of Lake Como
- Brigi - Città di Castello, Umbria
- Brostoi - Some areas south of Brescia
- Bruciata - Province of Florence and Province of Siena
- Brusè - Province of Parma
- Brüsatè - Piedmont
- Buerie - Friuli
- Caciole, infornatelle - Val Roveto, Abruzzo
- Callarosta - Vallerano (VT)
- Callaròsta - Canepina (VT)
- Còculi - Molochio (RC)
- Frugiata - Some areas of the Province of Pistoia and Province of Lucca
- Maroni, Marroni - Province of Modena and Province of Bologna
- Mondina - Garfagnana, Lucca Plain, Versilia, Lunigiana
- Mondìgoli, Mandìgoli - Northern part of the Province of Vicenza
- Mundaj, Mundà - Piedmont
- Mundìne - Val Camonica
- Nserta - Northern part of the Province of Cosenza
- Pastiji - Some areas of the Province of Reggio Calabria
- Pistiddre - Rotonda (PZ)
- Pistiddèr - Pollino (southern area of Basilicata)
- Riggiola - Northern part of the Province of Cosenza
- Ruseddre, Rusedde - Central-western Calabria
- Ruselle - Southern part of the Province of Cosenza
- Rustìa - Province of Genoa
- Varola - Montella (AV), Irpinia (AV), Melfi (PZ)
- Vojola - Soriano nel Cimino (VT)

=== Portugal and Spain ===
Roasted chestnuts are popular street food in Portugal. Called castanhas assadas ("roasted chestnuts") in Portuguese, it is sold around November, when Dia de São Martinho (St. Martin's Day) is celebrated across the country. Traditionally, newly harvested chestnuts are eaten around a bonfire on this day.

In some cities of Spain, during the winter period, portable grills are prepared with the intention of selling the roasted chestnuts in street stalls. In this case, the chestnuts are sold in paper cones (generally made from newspaper sheets). The tradition of the Magosto (roast chestnuts) is a tradition in the Iberian Peninsula.

== United States ==
=== New York City ===
Roasted chestnuts are sold as street food, primarily in Manhattan. While they have been sold regularly for well over a century, they have become less common. The vendors who continue to sell them say they mostly sell to tourists around the Christmas holidays. They are sold ($3-$4 a bag) starting either at the beginning of autumn, or when the first chill sets in – about the end of September, or early October, until early spring.

== Gallery ==
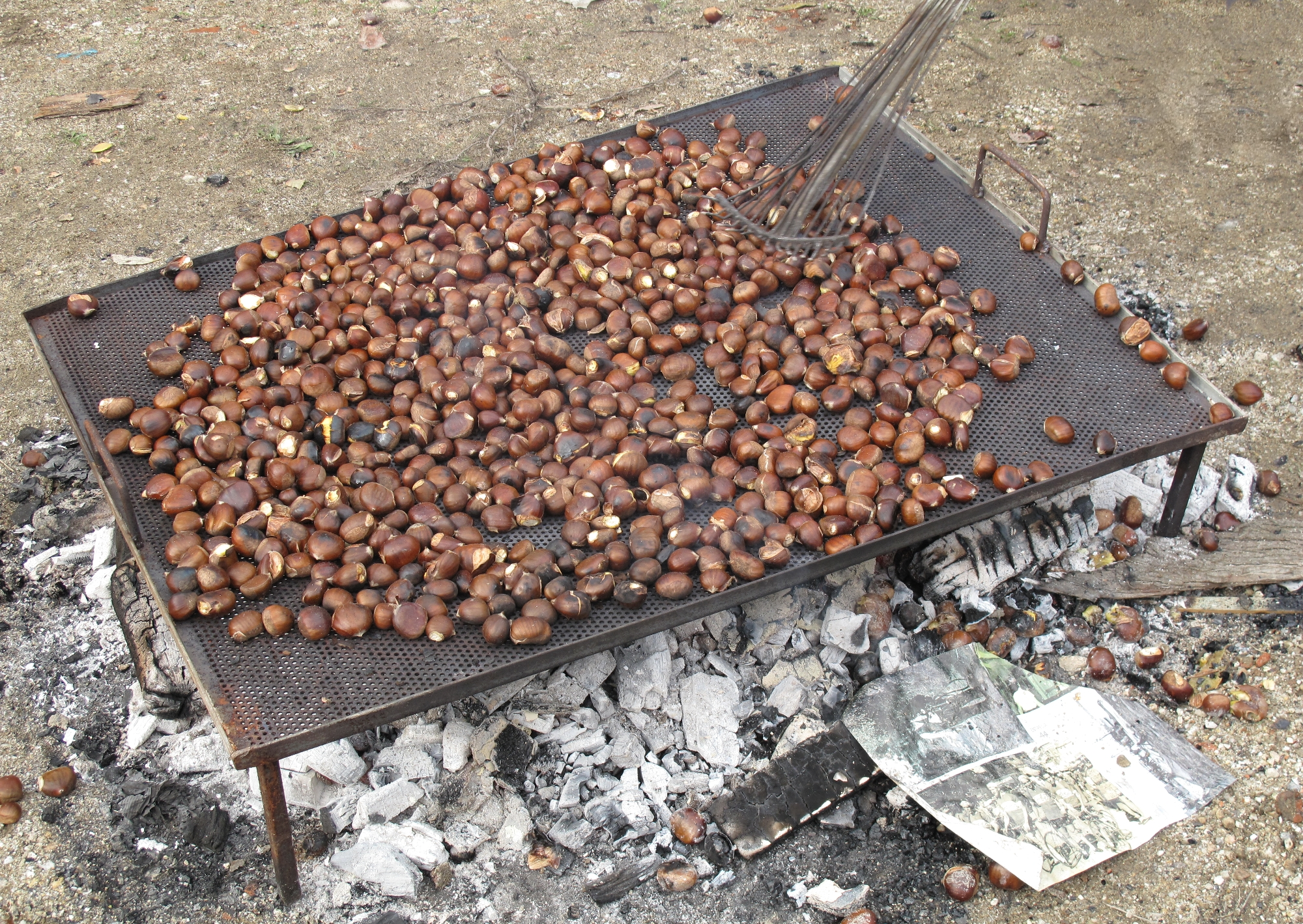
castañas asadas in Galicia, Spain

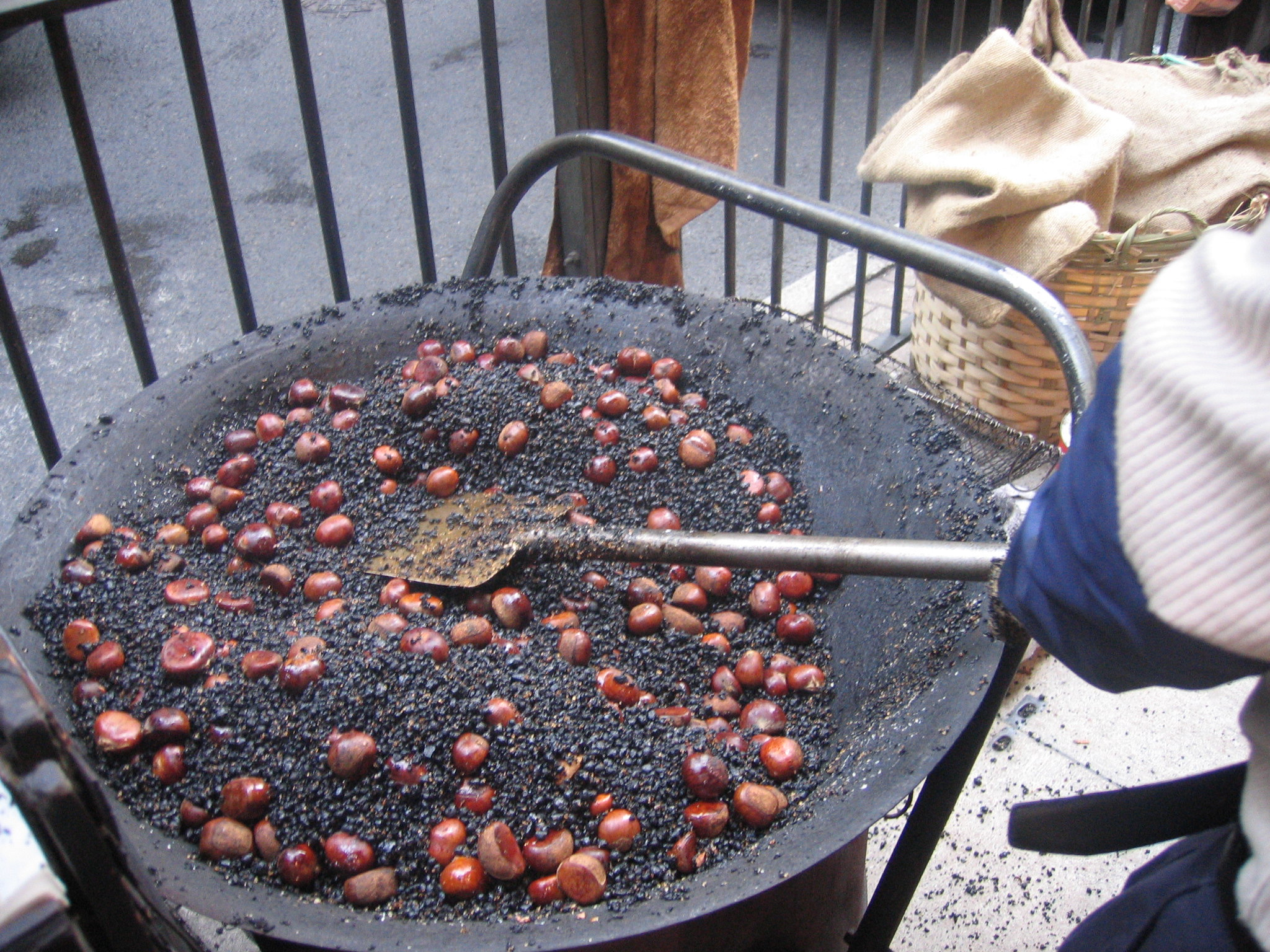
caau^{2}leot^{6}zi^{2} in Hong Kong, China

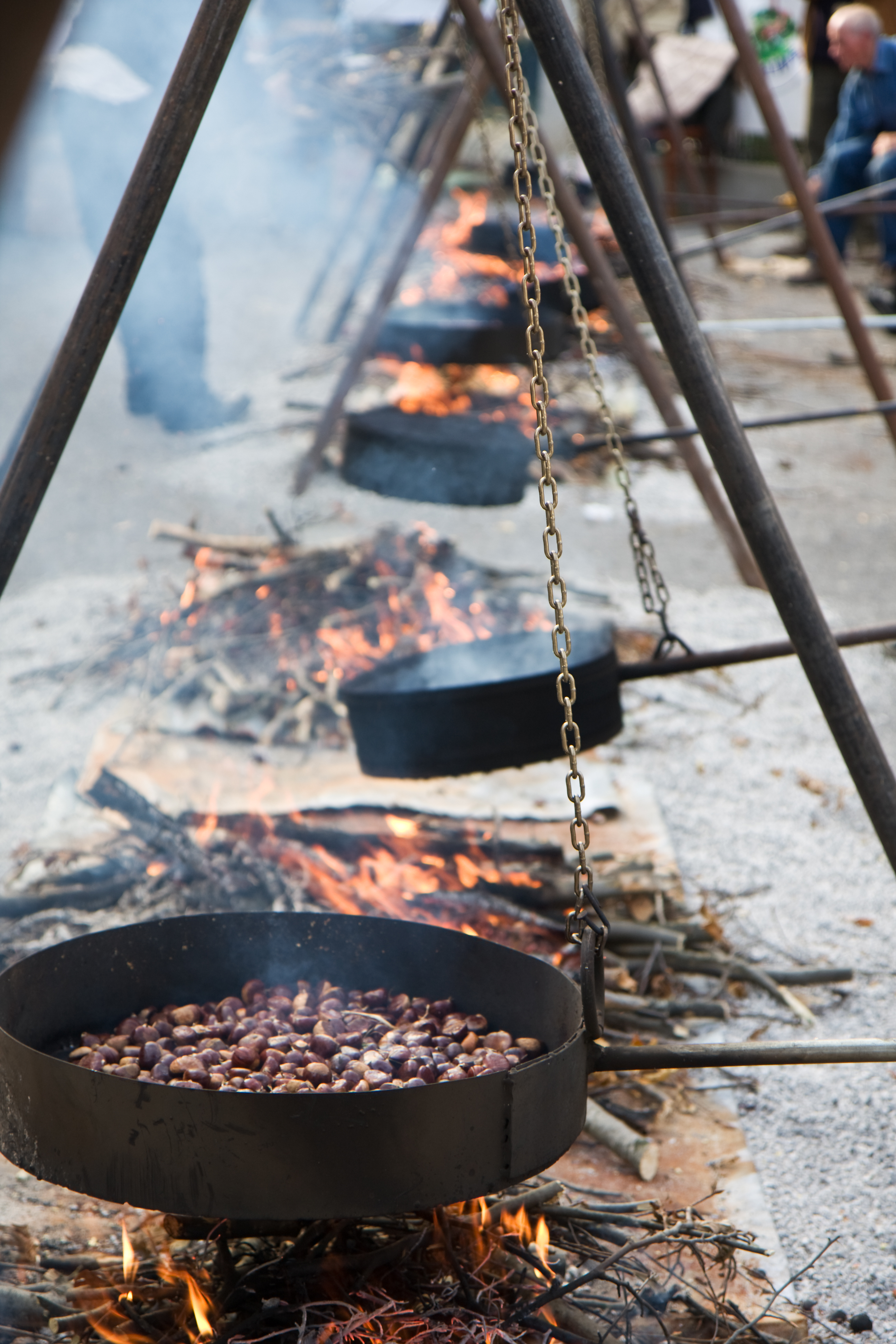
castagnata in Italy

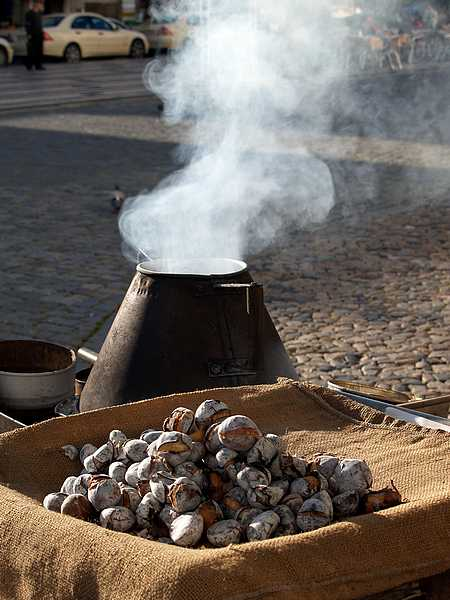
castanhas assadas in Portugal

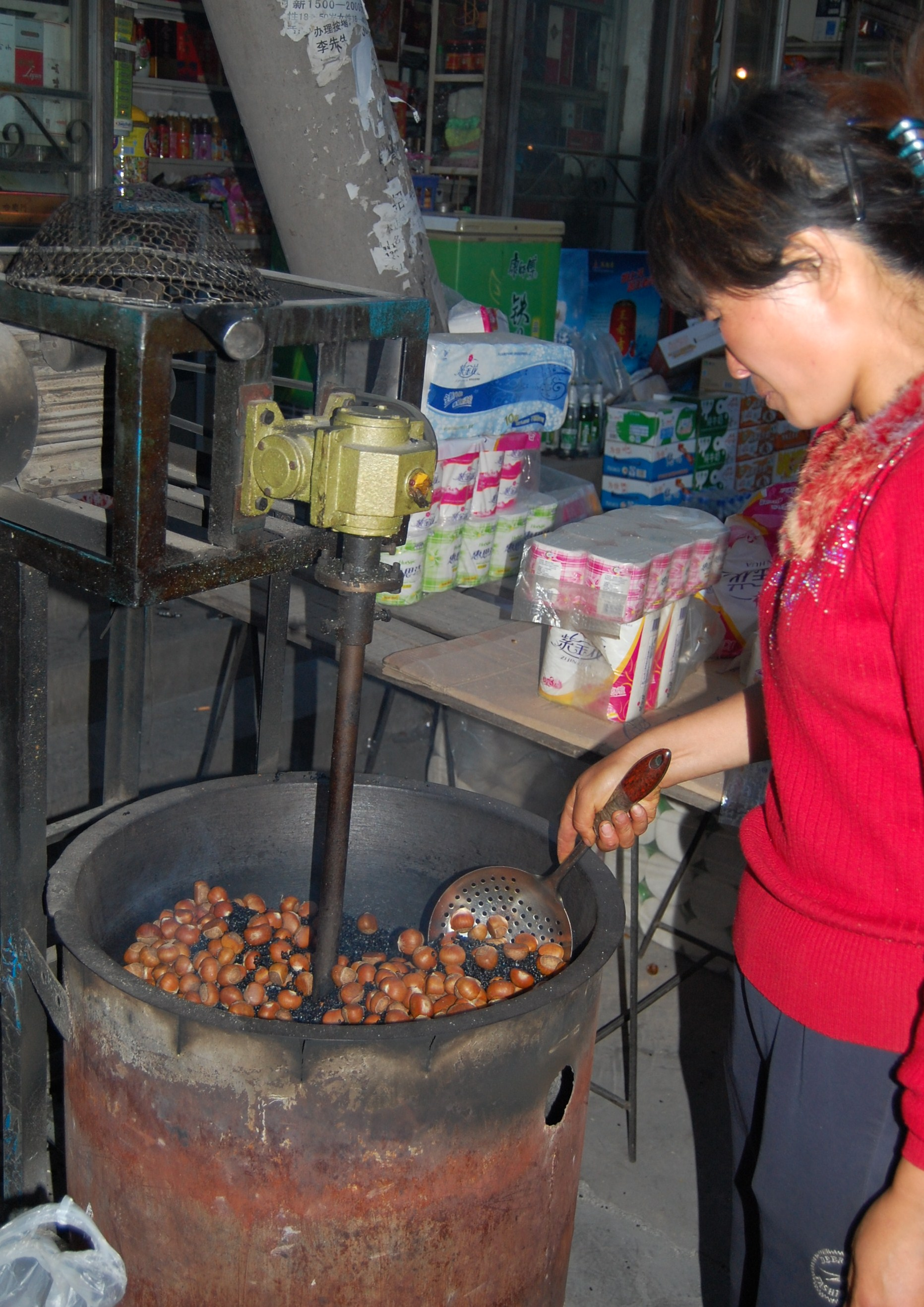
Roasted chestnut vendor in China

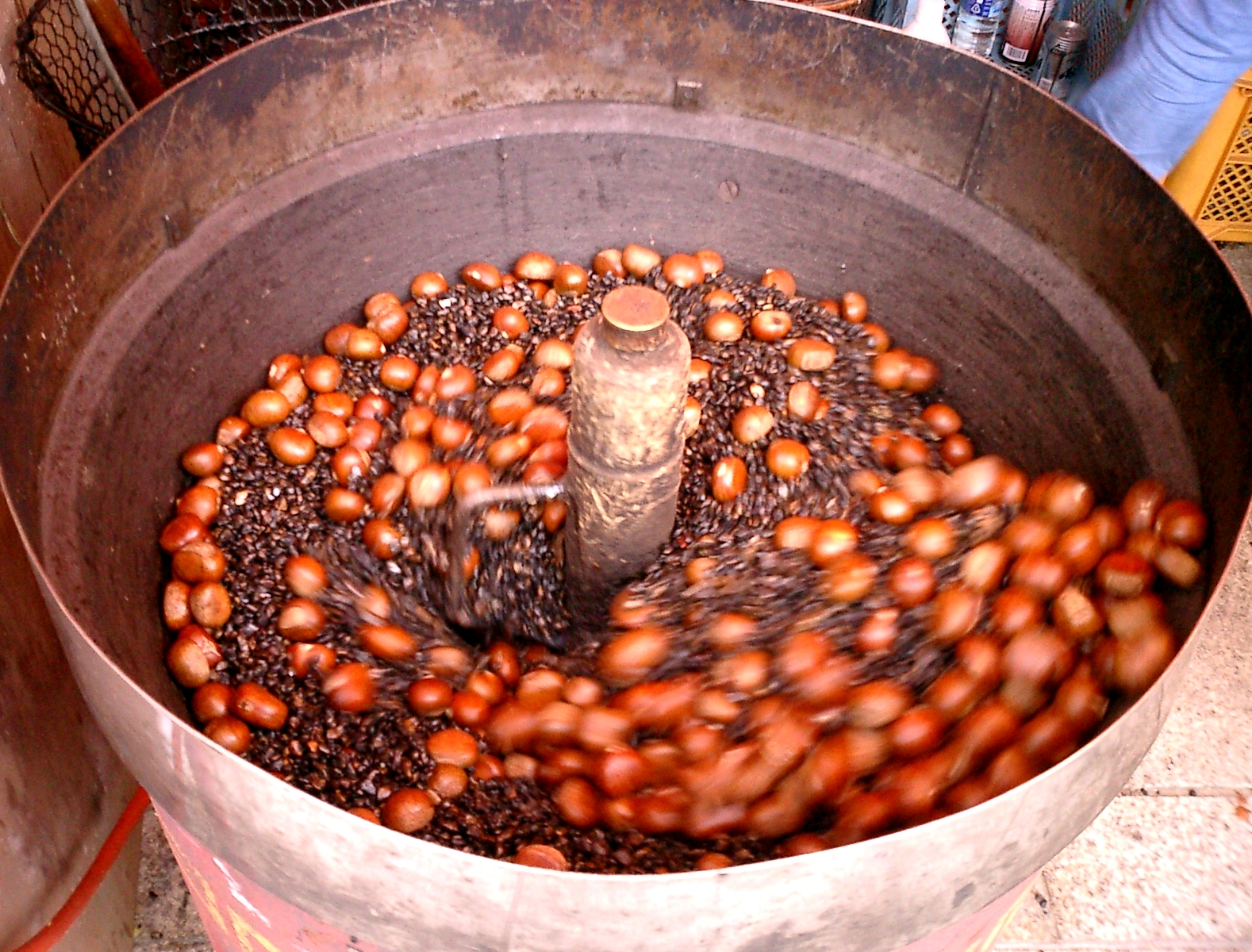
Amaguri chestnuts roasting in hot pebbles in Japan

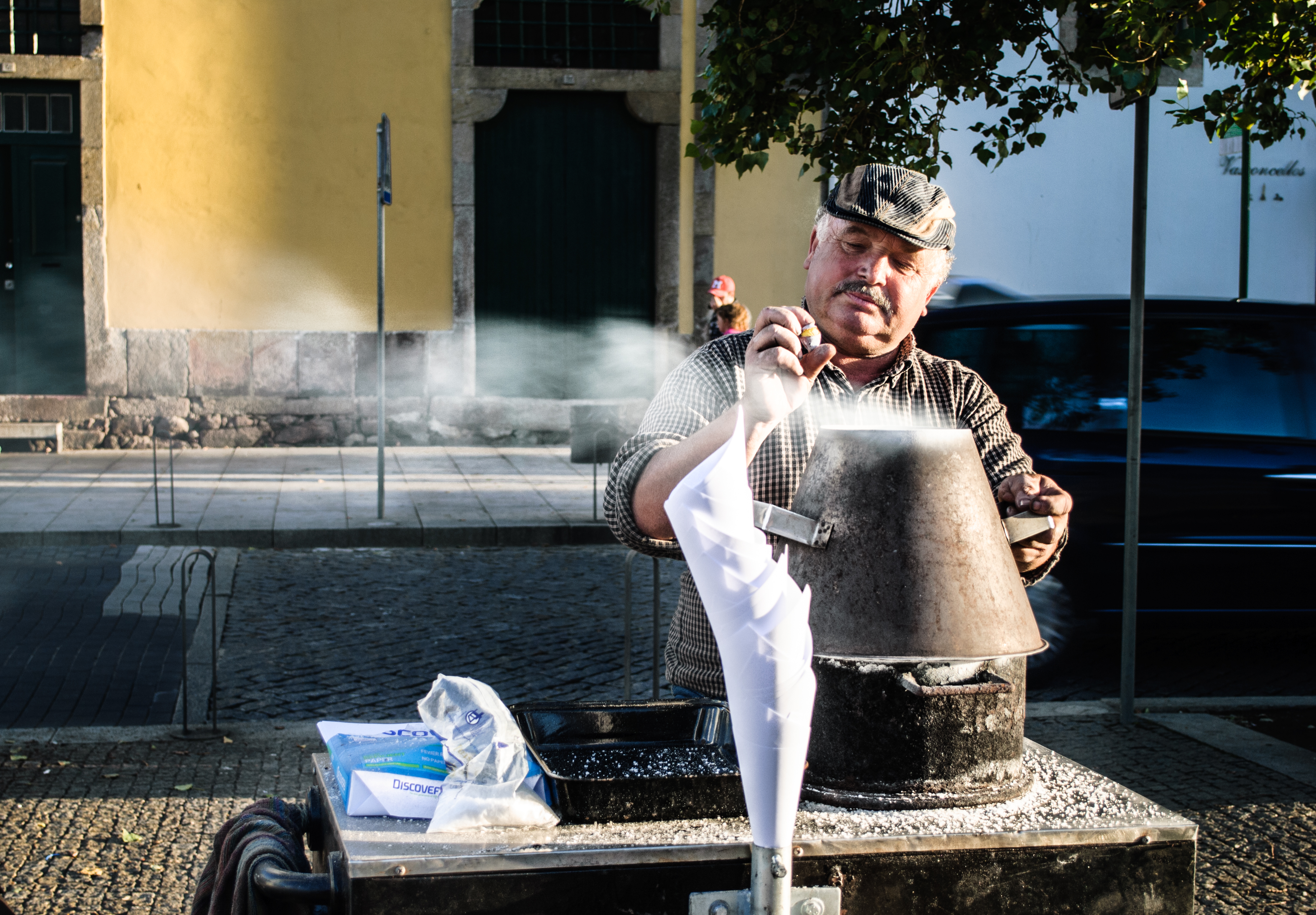
roasted chestnut vendor in Portugal

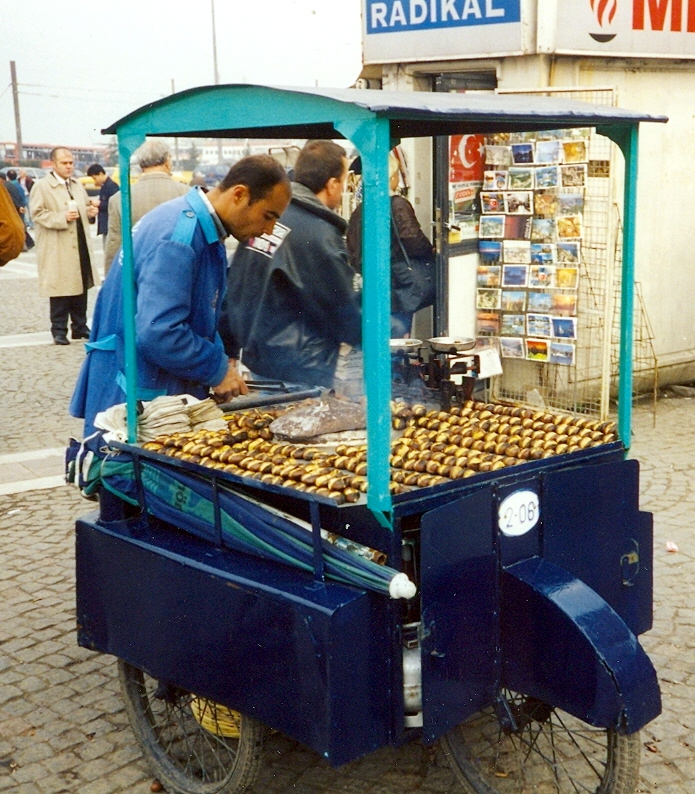
roasted chestnut vendor in Turkey

== See also ==
- Roasted sweet potato
