= List of Komi Can't Communicate episodes =

Key visual for the series

Komi Can't Communicate is an anime television series based on the manga series of the same name by Tomohito Oda. The anime adaptation was announced in May 2021, being produced by OLM and directed by Kazuki Kawagoe, with Ayumu Watanabe serving as chief director, scripts by Deko Akao, character designs by Atsuko Nakajima and music by Yukari Hashimoto. The series aired on TV Tokyo from October 7 to December 23, 2021. (Note: TV Tokyo listed the timeslot for the series as Wednesdays at 24:00, which is effectively Thursdays at midnight JST.) Netflix streamed the series worldwide on a weekly basis from October 21, 2021, to January 6, 2022. Cider Girl performed the opening theme song "Cinderella", while Kitri performed the ending theme song "Hikare Inochi".

Immediately following the first-season finale's broadcast in Japan, it was announced that the series would receive a second season. It aired from April 7 to June 23, 2022, in Japan, while Netflix streamed it worldwide from April 27 to July 13, 2022. Miku Itō performed the opening theme song "Ao 100 Shoku", while FantasticYouth performed the ending theme song "Koshaberi Biyori".

In December 2022, the series' official Twitter account announced that production retakes for animation featured in episodes from both seasons was conducted and had since been updated on Netflix to reflect the changes.

== Series overview ==
Season	Episodes	Segments	Originally released	
Season	Episodes	Segments	First released	Last released
1	12	43	October 7, 2021	December 23, 2021
2	12	33	April 7, 2022	June 23, 2022

== Episodes ==
=== Season 1 (2021) ===
No. overall	No. in season	Title	Directed by (Note: Production staff information is taken from the ending credits of each episode.)	Written by	Storyboarded by	Japanese air date	Worldwide release date
1	1	"It's just, I wish I could speak." Transliteration: "Shaberitain desu." (Japanese: 喋りたいんです。)	Kazuki Kawagoe	Deko Akao	Kazuki Kawagoe	October 7, 2021	October 21, 2021
Hitohito Tadano meets Shoko Komi, a beautiful but quiet girl, on their first day at Itan Private High School. Due to her looks and quiet demeanor, Komi automatically becomes popular, while Tadano becomes universally hated due to being assigned the desk next to hers. Tadano accidentally finds himself alone with Komi, who almost runs away when he talks to her, causing him to realize she suffers from an extreme case of social anxiety. As she cannot talk to people, Tadano suggests she write on the chalkboard, and she is able to communicate that she wants to speak normally but is unable to because of said anxiety. She apologizes for wasting Tadano's time and tries to leave, only for Tadano to write his own message on the board for her, allowing her to have her first real conversation with a friend. She reveals her dream is to make 100 friends, and Tadano, now becoming her first one, promises to help find the other 99. The next morning, it is revealed the entrance exam for their school was a personality interview, meaning it is full of weirdos, loners, miscreants, and eccentrics. As such, the task will be harder than Tadano thought.
2	2	"It's just a childhood friend." Transliteration: "Osananajimi desu." (Japanese: 幼馴染です。)	Daiei Andō	Deko Akao	Takumi Shibata	October 14, 2021	October 28, 2021
2	2	"I'm not a killer." Transliteration: "Koroshiya ja Nai desu." (Japanese: 殺し屋じゃないです。)	Daiei Andō	Deko Akao	Takumi Shibata	October 14, 2021	October 28, 2021
2	2	"It's just my first errand." Transliteration: "Hajimete no Otsukai desu." (Japanese: はじめてのおつかいです。)	Daiei Andō	Deko Akao	Takumi Shibata	October 14, 2021	October 28, 2021
"It's just a childhood friend.": Tadano introduces Komi to Najimi Osana, his childhood friend who is genderfluid. Due to moving schools frequently, Najimi is the childhood friend of absolutely everybody. However, Najimi reveals they failed to become Komi's friend years ago, the shock of failure leaving them with difficulty being around Komi to this day, though they do agree to walk Komi home. "I'm not a killer.": Tadano follows the two and sees that even Najimi struggles to converse with Komi. Najimi is approached by the delinquent Maa, another childhood friend, who confesses his love. Najimi switches back to being male to reject him, but Maa is determined. Komi attempts to speak, but her stammering speech and unblinking stare convince Maa she is an assassin, and he flees. Najimi decides to be Komi's friend for real. "It's just my first errand.": Najimi begins eating lunch with Tadano and Komi, making Tadano even more unpopular. Tadano explains Komi's desire for friends, so Najimi sends Komi to get a complicated coffee order by herself, claiming it is training to force Komi to speak. Despite several attempts, Komi gets the wrong coffee and cries, forcing Tadano and Najimi to apologize, though they both consider Komi's sulking cute.
3	3	"It's just stage fright." Transliteration: "Agarishō desu." (Japanese: あがり症です。)	Takahiro Tanaka	Deko Akao	Kazuki Kawagoe	October 21, 2021	November 4, 2021
3	3	"It's just a cell phone." Transliteration: "Keitai Denwa desu." (Japanese: 携帯電話です。)	Takahiro Tanaka	Deko Akao	Kazuki Kawagoe	October 21, 2021	November 4, 2021
3	3	"It's just a student election." Transliteration: "Iinkai Kime desu." (Japanese: 委員会決めです。)	Takahiro Tanaka	Deko Akao	Kazuki Kawagoe	October 21, 2021	November 4, 2021
3	3	"It's just an accidental call." Transliteration: "Machigai Denwa desu." (Japanese: 間違い電話です。)	Takahiro Tanaka	Deko Akao	Kazuki Kawagoe	October 21, 2021	November 4, 2021
3	3	"It's just a game." Transliteration: "Saitō-san desu." (Japanese: 齋藤さんです。)	Takahiro Tanaka	Deko Akao	Kazuki Kawagoe	October 21, 2021	November 4, 2021
"It's just stage fright.": Himiko Agari struggles to communicate and panics when Komi begins following her. Najimi advised Komi to befriend Agari since they both struggle with communication. Agari later thanks Komi for scaring her as it made it easier to communicate with her classmates. In gratitude, she decides to become Komi's lapdog. "It's just a cell phone.": Komi buys her first phone and is determined to ask everyone for their numbers. She manages to get Najimi's number, but Agari's lapdog routine puts her off from asking. Asking for Tadano's number is even more awkward when Agari accidentally ruins the moment. "It's just a student election.": Komi is elected class president against her will. Sensing her reluctance, Najimi instead has Komi voted class Goddess, while the more challenging role of president goes to Tadano with Najimi as vice-president. "It's just an accidental call.": Komi accidentally calls Tadano, leading to her awkward first phone call, which she and Tadano are proud of achieving. "It's just a game.": Komi is intrigued by the games played by popular students, so Najimi invites her to join. However, everyone lets Komi win due to her popularity. Tadano sabotages the second game to spare Komi an embarrassing moment, adding to his unpopularity, but he is happy when Komi thanks him for helping her have fun.
4	4	"It's just a physical." Transliteration: "Shintai Kensa desu." (Japanese: 身体検査です。)	Erkin Kawabata	Deko Akao	Erkin Kawabata	October 28, 2021	November 11, 2021
4	4	"It's just a crush." Transliteration: "Ren desu." (Japanese: 恋です。)	Erkin Kawabata	Deko Akao	Erkin Kawabata	October 28, 2021	November 11, 2021
"It's just a physical.": During physical exams, Makeru Yadano, who hates to lose, is determined to beat Komi. Komi wins by having better eyesight, being taller, and weighing less. Yadano decides a physical exam proves nothing and insists the exam is a draw. Tadano's scores were completely average on the exam. "It's just a crush.": Ren Yamai, a popular girl who is obsessed with Komi, forces Najimi to introduce them. Tadano wakes up in Yamai's bedroom, her having kidnapped him to keep him away from Komi. Najimi asks if she and Komi can visit Yamai's house, and she agrees. Najimi finds Tadano in a closet, forcing Yamai to reveal her belief she would make a better friend than Tadano. She is shocked when Komi rejects her in favor of Tadano. Komi blames herself for what happened and asks if Tadano will still be her friend, even speaking out loud to him. Najimi brings Yamai to give a confusing apology for her actions. Komi decides Yamai can know about her social anxiety. Yamai is shocked to learn the truth but decides being unable to speak makes Komi even cuter and will help her find 100 friends. After a brief hesitation, Komi decides Yamai can be her friend too.
5	5	"It's just my summer uniform." Transliteration: "Natsufuku desu." (Japanese: 夏服です。)	Kōki Uchinomiya	Deko Akao	Akinori Fudesaka	November 4, 2021	November 18, 2021
5	5	"It's just a fitness test." Transliteration: "Tairyoku Sokutei desu." (Japanese: 体力測定です。)	Kōki Uchinomiya	Deko Akao	Akinori Fudesaka	November 4, 2021	November 18, 2021
5	5	"It's just veggies. Garlic. Lots of lard. Soy sauce." Transliteration: "Yasai Ninniku Abura Mashi Mashi Karame desu." (Japanese: ヤサイニンニクアブラマシマシカラメです。)	Kōki Uchinomiya	Deko Akao	Akinori Fudesaka	November 4, 2021	November 18, 2021
5	5	"It's just a blood pact." Transliteration: "Chi no Keiyaku desu." (Japanese: 血の契約です。)	Kōki Uchinomiya	Deko Akao	Akinori Fudesaka	November 4, 2021	November 18, 2021
"It's just my summer uniform.": Komi is somehow even more attractive in her summer uniform. "It's just a fitness test.": Yadano is determined to beat Komi during fitness tests but loses yet again. Komi is unable to shake her hand, so Yadano becomes even more determined to beat her. "It's just veggies. Garlic. Lots of lard. Soy sauce.": Najimi asks to visit Komi's house, and they, along with Tadano, meet her very outgoing mother, Shūko. Najimi leaves Komi and Tadano alone together but is disappointed that nothing happens. Najimi finds Komi's childhood photo album. Najimi sends Komi photos of their visit, which Komi saves in a photo frame. Komi asks to visit a ramen shop, so Agari takes everyone to Ramen Darou. There, Komi follows all the unspoken rules perfectly, which earns her admiration. "It's just a blood pact.": Omoharu Nakanaka, a chūnibyō, claims Komi is Princess Komilia, her friend from a previous life. Tadano remembers acting similarly in middle school. Realizing Nakanaka is lonely, Komi volunteers to be Nakanaka's gym partner. Najimi takes Tadano's umbrella and leaves a note, so Komi and Tadano share hers. She notices he lets his shoulder get wet to give her more cover. At a convenience store, Tadano realizes that Komi read Najimi's note and waited for him so they could share hers.
6	6	"It's just a joke." Transliteration: "Gyagu desu." (Japanese: ギャグです。)	Naoki Murata	Yumi Suzumori	Toshinori Watanabe	November 11, 2021	November 25, 2021
6	6	"It's just shopping." Transliteration: "Kaimono desu." (Japanese: 買い物です。)	Naoki Murata	Yumi Suzumori	Toshinori Watanabe	November 11, 2021	November 25, 2021
6	6	"It's just the hair salon." Transliteration: "Biyōin desu." (Japanese: 美容院です。)	Naoki Murata	Yumi Suzumori	Toshinori Watanabe	November 11, 2021	November 25, 2021
6	6	"It's just an unsettling feeling." Transliteration: "Moyamoya desu." (Japanese: モヤモヤです。)	Naoki Murata	Yumi Suzumori	Toshinori Watanabe	November 11, 2021	November 25, 2021
6	6	"It's just a study group." Transliteration: "Tesuto Benkyō desu." (Japanese: テスト勉強です。)	Naoki Murata	Yumi Suzumori	Toshinori Watanabe	November 11, 2021	November 25, 2021
6	6	"It's just summer break." Transliteration: "Natsuyasumi desu." (Japanese: 夏休みです。)	Naoki Murata	Yumi Suzumori	Toshinori Watanabe	November 11, 2021	November 25, 2021
"It's just a joke.": Komi attempts to tell a joke but lacks situational humor or comedic timing. Tadano is similarly bad at joketelling, but Komi is impressed anyway. "It's just shopping.": Komi has never shopped for clothes, so everyone picks clothes they think suit her. Komi ends up buying a dress chosen by Tadano. "It's just the hair salon.": Komi goes to a beauty salon. Maki Karisu, the owner, knows Komi and can understand her. In contrast, her trainee, Kamiko Arai, thinks Komi's silence is a criticism of her customer service skills until Komi manages to thank her. The next day, only Tadano notices her haircut, making Komi happy. "It's just an unsettling feeling.": Komi cannot sleep due to her worrying about her failed conversations throughout the day, but eventually does so, thinking about how Tadano helped her. "It's just a study group.": Najimi asks for help studying but grows bored. After making too much noise in the school library, Najimi is punished. Everyone ultimately passes their exams. Yadano is furious Komi scored higher than her on every exam. "It's just summer break.": Over the summer, both Komi and Tadano spend the first week feeling lonely but are too nervous to call each other. Najimi unknowingly solves the problem by inviting them both to a waterpark.
7	7	"It's just the pool." Transliteration: "Pūru desu." (Japanese: プールです。)	Sōta Yokote	Yumi Suzumori	Fumiya Hōjō	November 18, 2021	December 2, 2021
7	7	"It's just shaved ice." Transliteration: "Kakigōri desu." (Japanese: かき氷です。)	Sōta Yokote	Yumi Suzumori	Fumiya Hōjō	November 18, 2021	December 2, 2021
7	7	"It's just a library." Transliteration: "Toshokan desu." (Japanese: 図書館です。)	Sōta Yokote	Yumi Suzumori	Fumiya Hōjō	November 18, 2021	December 2, 2021
7	7	"It's just a park." Transliteration: "Kōen desu." (Japanese: 公園です。)	Sōta Yokote	Yumi Suzumori	Fumiya Hōjō	November 18, 2021	December 2, 2021
"It's just the pool.": Despite feeling nervous, Komi makes it to the pool on time and wears the dress Tadano chose. Komi only owns a school swimsuit, so Yamai forces her to buy a bikini. Komi later trips and scrapes her knee. Unable to enter the water, Komi sits alone. Tadano makes her feel better and pulls her into a shallow pool to keep her bandage dry, then panics when he realizes he held Komi's hand. After ending the day with a water gun fight, everyone heads home. "It's just shaved ice.": Komi decides to visit the library. Her father, who is also bad at communicating, goes with her, and they get shaved ice. Through mostly non-verbal communication, they manage to talk about Komi's school life. "It's just a library.": Komi finds a book but is too scared to ask to borrow it, so she decides to read it. When her stare scares a baby, she manages to cheer him up. Tadano, who is also at the library, watches happily from nearby and forgets to return his own books. "It's just a park.": Komi goes to a park and has fun while she is alone. A passing Tadano is awed by her beauty and again forgets to return his books.
8	8	"It's just Obon."; Transliteration: "Obon desu." (Japanese: お盆です。)	Nobu Ishida	Deko Akao	Akinori Fudesaka	November 25, 2021	December 9, 2021
8	8	"It's just a festival." Transliteration: "Omatsuri desu." (Japanese: お祭りです。)	Nobu Ishida	Deko Akao	Akinori Fudesaka	November 25, 2021	December 9, 2021
8	8	"It's just the end of summer." Transliteration: "Natsuyasumi mo Owari desu." (Japanese: 夏休みも終わりです。)	Nobu Ishida	Deko Akao	Akinori Fudesaka	November 25, 2021	December 9, 2021
"It's just Obon.": Komi and her family visit their relatives. Although initially uneasy, Komi and her cousin, Akira, bond and play together. Komi is later summoned by her grandmother Yuiko to update her on her life. However, when asked if she likes a boy, Komi shakes nervously, which alerts her grandmother, who immediately discovers Tadano's name on her phone. "It's just a festival.": Najimi invites Komi and Tadano to a summer festival. Komi gets anxious, as she has forgotten to bring something to write on, prompting Tadano to say he will help her. They visit some of the various stands and games, in which Komi beats Yadano in a shooting game and wins a video game console. Komi later manages to compliment Tadano's look verbally. While waiting for their friends, Komi writes with a stick that she enjoyed her time alone with Tadano, only to quickly erase it before he can see it. "It's just the end of summer.": Komi, Najimi, and Yamai visit Tadano's home, where they meet Tadano's sister, Hitomi. There, they reminisce about how much fun they had during the summer. They notice Komi crying as she explains she actually does not want the summer to end for the first time.
9	9	"It's just a country kid." (Note: In the episode, it is titled "I'm just a country girl."); Transliteration: "Inaka no Ko desu." (Japanese: 田舎の子です。)	Seo Hye-Jin	Yumi Suzumori	Erkin Kawabata	December 2, 2021	December 16, 2021
9	9	"It's just a video game." Transliteration: "Terebi Gēmu desu." (Japanese: テレビゲームです。)	Seo Hye-Jin	Yumi Suzumori	Erkin Kawabata	December 2, 2021	December 16, 2021
9	9	"It's just a part-time job." Transliteration: "Arubaito desu." (Japanese: アルバイトです。)	Seo Hye-Jin	Yumi Suzumori	Erkin Kawabata	December 2, 2021	December 16, 2021
9	9	"It's just... something on your face." Transliteration: "Kao ni Gomi ga Tsuitemasu... desu." (Japanese: 顔にゴミがついてます…です。)	Seo Hye-Jin	Yumi Suzumori	Erkin Kawabata	December 2, 2021	December 16, 2021
"It's just a country kid.": The semester after summer vacation begins. Nokoko Inaka is distressed because she is from the countryside. After overhearing that Komi will buy Najimi a sandwich, she follows her to learn how to order food like a city girl. "It's just a video game.": Nakanaka invites Komi to hang out at her house. Nervous at having Komi at her home by herself, she invites Najimi, who brings along Tadano. They play a video game, and Tadano teaches Komi how to play. "It's just a part-time job.": On their day off, Najimi asks Komi and Tadano to help distribute tissues in a retail store. Despite a difficult start, Komi becomes more confident when she finally gives a tissue to a woman and distributes the whole box by the end of the day. "It's just... something on your face.": Tadano shows up in class with a seed stuck on his face, but Komi is too nervous to tell him. After realizing that he calls Najimi by their first name, she also asks him to call her by her first name. Tadano is unable to do so. When told by Najimi to also call Tadano by his first name to set the example, Komi, embarrassed, fails at doing so as well.
10	10	"It's just sports day." Transliteration: "Taiikusai desu." (Japanese: 体育祭です。)	Akira Koremoto	Yumi Suzumori	Tetsuo Yajima	December 9, 2021	December 23, 2021
10	10	"It's just emotional pangs." Transliteration: "Chotto Kurushii Yō na Kimochi desu." (Japanese: ちょっと苦しいような気持ちです。)	Akira Koremoto	Yumi Suzumori	Tetsuo Yajima	December 9, 2021	December 23, 2021
10	10	"It's just photo stickers." Transliteration: "Purinto Shīru desu." (Japanese: プリントシールです。)	Akira Koremoto	Yumi Suzumori	Tetsuo Yajima	December 9, 2021	December 23, 2021
"It's just sports day.": The school holds its annual sports day, where Komi meets Chika Netsuno, a highly competitive second-year student. After several events, Komi takes part in the relay race against Netsuno. She slips and falls, but encouragement from her friends enables her to continue running and finish in second place. Oblivious to the result of the race, Komi's friends come to her aid, much to Netsuno's delight. "It's just emotional pangs.": Komi experiences jealousy for the first time as Nene Onemine, a fellow classmate, is helping Tadano with his excessive class president duties. One evening, Onemine is helping Tadano before Komi arrives and offers her help, which Tadano accepts. Sensing Komi's affection towards Tadano, Onemine leaves the two of them alone. Onemine later befriends Komi and apologizes for interfering. "It's just photo stickers.": Komi goes to a mall photo booth with her friends, much to her delight. In an arcade, Tadano sees a cat keychain in a claw game and wins it for Komi. Three days later, he wants to give it to her at school, but she already has one, so they exchange them. Komi arrives home from school, holding onto Tadano's keychain tightly.
11	11	"It's just a performance for the culture festival." Transliteration: "Bunkasai no Dashimono desu." (Japanese: 文化祭の出し物です。)	Shintarō Noro	Yumi Suzumori	Masatoshi Hakata	December 16, 2021 (Note: This episode aired at 12:10 a.m. JST, 10 minutes after the original air time on TV Tokyo.)	December 30, 2021
11	11	"It's just festival preparations." Transliteration: "Bunkasai Junbi desu." (Japanese: 文化祭準備です。)	Shintarō Noro	Yumi Suzumori	Masatoshi Hakata	December 16, 2021	December 30, 2021
11	11	"It's just flyers distribution." Transliteration: "Chirashi Kubari desu." (Japanese: チラシ配りです。)	Shintarō Noro	Yumi Suzumori	Masatoshi Hakata	December 16, 2021	December 30, 2021
11	11	"It's just the culture festival eve." Transliteration: "Bunkasai Zenjitsu desu." (Japanese: 文化祭前日です。)	Shintarō Noro	Yumi Suzumori	Masatoshi Hakata	December 16, 2021	December 30, 2021
11	11	"It's just maids." Transliteration: "Meido desu." (Japanese: メイドです。)	Shintarō Noro	Yumi Suzumori	Masatoshi Hakata	December 16, 2021	December 30, 2021
"It's just a performance for the culture festival.": Komi's class is undecided about what they want to do for the upcoming culture festival. Komi quietly confides to Tadano that she would like to do a maid café. The whole class hears this and immediately agrees. "It's just festival preparations.": Onemine and Kaede Otori, another girl from Komi's class, are entrusted with getting the materials for the festival. Otori asks Komi to help them, which she agrees. Afterward, Komi reveals to Otori that she had always felt useless to her classmates back in middle school and felt happy when she asked her for help. "It's just flyers distribution.": Komi, Najimi, and Tadano distribute flyers for the festival. Komi nervously hands them to people they have met, including the mother of the baby she befriended at the library. "It's just the culture festival eve.": The girls, including Komi and Najimi, surprise the boys with onigiri. When Komi realizes Tadano picked the one she made, she is elated, which Onemine notices. "It's just maids.": Komi, Najimi, and Tadano dress as maids during the festival. While the boys feel uncomfortable around Tadano, Komi responds positively to his new look, as she thinks he looks adorable. Tadano is later made fun of by Hitomi, who takes a picture of him to show to their mother.
12	12	"It's just the culture festival." Transliteration: "Bunkasai desu." (Japanese: 文化祭です。)	Erkin Kawabata	Deko Akao	Masatoshi Hakata	December 23, 2021	January 6, 2022
12	12	"It's just the post-festival." Transliteration: "Kōyasai desu." (Japanese: 後夜祭です。)	Fuminori Ishimaru	Deko Akao	Masatoshi Hakata	December 23, 2021	January 6, 2022
12	12	"It's just the after-party." Transliteration: "Uchiage desu." (Japanese: 打ち上げです。)	Kazuki Kawagoe	Deko Akao	Kazuki Kawagoe	December 23, 2021	January 6, 2022
"It's just the culture festival.": At the festival, Najimi uses shady tactics to attract more customers. However, they are caught and forced to provide refunds. Komi, Tadano, and Najimi later visit a haunted house and the school's rooftop confessions before the meditation club drags Najimi away. Komi and Tadano then hang out with Onemine and Otori by visiting the various stalls and activities. "It's just the post-festival.": In the gymnasium, Komi's class is announced as the festival's winners. However, thanks to Najimi's actions, they are not awarded the grand prize. Everyone later gathers for the dance party. Komi wishes to dance with Tadano, who nervously tries to lead the way. An enthusiastic Najimi then joins them. "It's just the after-party.": After the festival, Komi's class heads to a karaoke bar. There, Komi receives praise for her singing, even though she was too nervous to actually do so. When it is Tadano's turn, he is ignored by almost everyone except Komi, which gives him the motivation needed to finish. Later at her house, Komi cherishes the friends she has made so far.

=== Season 2 (2022) ===
No. overall	No. in season	Title	Directed by	Written by	Storyboarded by	Japanese air date	Worldwide release date
13	1	"It's just the arrival of winter." Transliteration: "Fuyu no Otozure desu." (Japanese: 冬の訪れです。)	Akira Koremoto	Deko Akao	Kazuki Kawagoe	April 7, 2022	April 27, 2022
13	1	"It's just a delinquent." Transliteration: "Furyō desu." (Japanese: 不良です。)	Akira Koremoto	Deko Akao	Kazuki Kawagoe	April 7, 2022	April 27, 2022
13	1	"It's just studying at Nakanaka's."; Transliteration: "Nakanaka-san Chi de Benkyō desu." (Japanese: 中々さんちで勉強です。)	Akira Koremoto	Deko Akao	Kazuki Kawagoe	April 7, 2022	April 27, 2022
13	1	"It's just a final exam." Transliteration: "Kimatsu Tesuto desu." (Japanese: 期末テストです。)	Akira Koremoto	Deko Akao	Kazuki Kawagoe	April 7, 2022	April 27, 2022
"It's just the arrival of winter.": At school, after Najimi gently grazes Komi's cheek with their hand, Komi decides to do the same to Tadano. Outside their classroom, Najimi hands Komi a small notebook, telling her to write the names of all the friends she has made so far. She nervously hands Tadano the notebook so he can write his name first. "It's just a delinquent.": Makoto Katai, a nervous new student, arrives in class. However, his intimidating appearance deters anyone from talking to him. Tadano ultimately endears himself to Katai when he talks to him. "It's just studying at Nakanaka's.": Nakanaka invites everyone over to her house. When they arrive, Yamai gets on Nakanaka's nerves, prompting them to argue. When Komi responds that they are both equally important to her, an unsatisfied Nakanaka challenges them to play a video game, which Najimi wins. "It's just a final exam.": Komi drops her pencil during an exam but is too afraid to ask the teacher to pick it up. Tadano sees this and helps her by intentionally dropping his own pencil. Tadano later realizes he does not have an eraser, so Komi decides to return the favor. Afterward, they are both too embarrassed to concentrate. Back home, Tadano does not allow Hitomi to use the eraser Komi gave him.
14	2	"It's just a typhoon." Transliteration: "Taifū desu." (Japanese: 台風です。)	Nobu Ishida	Yumi Suzumori	Shinji Itadaki	April 14, 2022	May 4, 2022
14	2	"It's just a fantasy." Transliteration: "Mōsō desu." (Japanese: 妄想です。)	Nobu Ishida	Yumi Suzumori	Shinji Itadaki	April 14, 2022	May 4, 2022
14	2	"It's just a cat cafe." Transliteration: "Neko Kafe desu." (Japanese: ネコカフェです。)	Nobu Ishida	Yumi Suzumori	Shinji Itadaki	April 14, 2022	May 4, 2022
14	2	"It's just the 'I love you game'." Transliteration: "Ai Shiteru Gēmu desu." (Japanese: 愛してるゲームです。)	Nobu Ishida	Yumi Suzumori	Shinji Itadaki	April 14, 2022	May 4, 2022
"It's just a typhoon.": A strong typhoon arrives, scaring Komi. However, when Tadano calls her, she asks him to keep talking to her, feeling comforted. Later at school, Yamai tries to see the reflection of Komi's panties in a puddle. She fails, however, and has to comfort herself with her beauty instead. "It's just a fantasy.": Tadano's male classmates sit together, and each of them describes what a romantic relationship would look like with their female classmates. However, when they cannot think of one involving Komi, Tadano does so and embarrasses himself as a result. "It's just a cat cafe.": Komi, Onemine, and Otori visit a cat café. While Komi loves cats, none want to play with her, leaving her jealous of Otori. However, a black cat named Chocolat approaches and lets Komi pet her, delighting her as Onemine takes a picture. "It's just the 'I love you game'.": Yamai and Najimi play the "I Love You Game" with Komi to see her response to the words "I love you" coming from different people. When it is Tadano's turn, he is interrupted before he can say it. Komi excuses herself and, outside the classroom, thinks about how she wanted him to finish the phrase. She then goes to visit Chocolat.
15	3	"It's just a feeling." (Note: In the episode, it is titled "It's just a thought."); Transliteration: "Kimochi desu." (Japanese: 気持ちです。)	Toshihiro Maeya	Yumi Suzumori	Masashi Kojima	April 21, 2022	May 11, 2022
15	3	"It's just a fantasy, part 2."; Transliteration: "Mōsō desu. Ni" (Japanese: 妄想です。2)	Toshihiro Maeya	Yumi Suzumori	Masashi Kojima	April 21, 2022	May 11, 2022
15	3	"It's just an invitation to lunch." Transliteration: "Ohiru no Osasoi desu." (Japanese: お昼のお誘いです。)	Toshihiro Maeya	Yumi Suzumori	Masashi Kojima	April 21, 2022	May 11, 2022
15	3	"It's just roasted sweet potatoes." Transliteration: "Ishi Yakiimo desu." (Japanese: 石焼き芋です。)	Toshihiro Maeya	Yumi Suzumori	Masashi Kojima	April 21, 2022	May 11, 2022
"It's just a feeling.": Tadano attempts to teach Nakanaka and Yamai how to understand what Komi is thinking at any given time. However, they fail to read her properly and feud amongst themselves. "It's just a fantasy, part 2.": Tadano's classmates once again imagine romantic scenarios. When they finally imagine one involving Komi, they depict her as an over-protective, deadly assassin. They stop their conversation once Komi enters the classroom. "It's just an invitation to lunch.": Katai attempts to invite Tadano to have lunch with him. Sensing Tadano and Komi's fear, he leaves the classroom, but Tadano follows him. Katai has trouble being friendly to him without intimidating him, but Tadano asks him not to push himself. Delighted, Katai finally acknowledges the concerned Komi and invites her to have lunch with them, to which she agrees. "It's just roasted sweet potatoes.": Komi chases after a yakiimo food truck. She manages to buy some after the man finally understands what her expressions mean. Meanwhile, Tadano cringes when he recalls dancing with Komi while dressed as a maid during the culture festival. Believing he is way out of her league, he goes outside. He then runs into Komi, who gives him yakiimo to take home. Tadano invites her to hang out during winter break, which she agrees to.
16	4	"It's just a merry Christmas." (Note: In the episode, it is titled "It's just... Christmas."); Transliteration: "Merī Kurisumasu... desu." (Japanese: メリークリスマス…です。)	Sumito Sasaki	Yumi Suzumori	Masatoshi Hakata	April 28, 2022	May 18, 2022
On Christmas Eve, Komi panics when she reads a message from Najimi, challenging her to buy presents for all her friends. She brings Shousuke along. Meanwhile, everyone meets at the mall, where Najimi challenges them to buy a present that Komi likes the best. As they cannot decide, Tadano proposes to buy her a massive black cat plushie. Later that day, they arrive at Komi's house, where they present the plushie as a joint Christmas-Birthday gift, as her birthday is on the 25th. As they enter, almost everyone competes to decide their place to sit. However, Komi chooses to sit next to Tadano. They then play the King Game, where everyone is given a number written on a stick, and the King gets to order a number to perform actions on another. As they play, Komi is ordered to dress like Santa Claus by Najimi, while Tadano is dared to kiss Shinobino on the cheek by Komi's mother, as Komi observes. When it is her turn as King, Komi orders everyone to remain her friend. After they leave, Komi sends a Christmas message to all her friends while caressing her new plushie.
17	5	"It's just a snowman." Transliteration: "Yukidaruma desu." (Japanese: 雪だるまです。)	Hiroaki Takagi	Yumi Suzumori	Hiroaki Takagi	May 5, 2022	May 25, 2022
17	5	"It's just a snowball fight." Transliteration: "Yukigassen desu." (Japanese: 雪合戦です。)	Hiroaki Takagi	Yumi Suzumori	Hiroaki Takagi	May 5, 2022	May 25, 2022
17	5	"It's just the end of the year." Transliteration: "Nenmatsu desu." (Japanese: 年末です。)	Hiroaki Takagi	Yumi Suzumori	Hiroaki Takagi	May 5, 2022	May 25, 2022
17	5	"It's just New Year's."; Transliteration: "Gantan desu." (Japanese: 元旦です。)	Hiroaki Takagi	Yumi Suzumori	Hiroaki Takagi	May 5, 2022	May 25, 2022
"It's just a snowman.": Komi, Tadano, and Najimi decide to make snowmen. After Tadano makes a small snowman, he helps his friends create a much larger one. Komi then makes a snowman, placing it next to Tadano's. "It's just a snowball fight.": Tadano and his friends engage in a snowball fight with a group of elementary school children, whom a reluctant Komi joins. While Tadano's team easily eliminates the children, Yamai betrays her remaining teammates when they begin to take aim at Komi. As such, the children look at Komi with admiration. "It's just the end of the year.": Komi and her family visit Yuiko's household for New Year's Eve. Komi happily reunites with Akira, who teaches Komi how to play hanafuda. However, Yuiko arrives and wagers with Akira, stripping her of her New Year's money after defeating her. Komi then avenges Akira. "It's just New Year's.": Komi accompanies her grandmother to a shrine on New Year's Day. While they pray, Yuiko asks Komi if her wish from the previous year came true, which Komi confirms. After one of Yuiko's friends explains one of his miko will be unavailable, Komi joins Inaka in attending the stall. Komi later thanks Inaka for her help, wishing for them to get along this year.
18	6	"It's just everyone's New Years."; Transliteration: "Sorezore no Oshōgatsu desu." (Japanese: それぞれのお正月です。)	Motomasa Maeda	Yumi Suzumori	Masashi Kojima	May 12, 2022	June 1, 2022
18	6	"It's just ice skating." Transliteration: "Aisu Sukēto desu." (Japanese: アイススケートです。)	Motomasa Maeda	Yumi Suzumori	Masashi Kojima	May 12, 2022	June 1, 2022
18	6	"It's just a cold." Transliteration: "Kaze desu." (Japanese: 風邪です。)	Motomasa Maeda	Yumi Suzumori	Masashi Kojima	May 12, 2022	June 1, 2022
"It's just everyone's New Years.": Najimi and Tadano call all their friends to visit the shrine. As they arrive, they all rush inside, but Komi stays behind with Tadano. They then get their fortunes read, where Komi ultimately reveals she got good luck this year. "It's just ice skating.": Katai gathers his courage to invite Tadano to an ice rink. When he goes to meet Tadano, he is shocked to see Komi coming as well. Tadano quickly realizes that Katai and Komi do not know how to skate. When he tries to teach Komi first, he becomes too embarrassed. Tadano then switches over to Katai and, after saving him from falling, guides him by holding his hand while a confused Komi watches. "It's just a cold.": Tadano is confined to his bed after he comes down with a fever. He tries to call Najimi for help but accidentally calls Komi instead. He hears the doorbell and is shocked to see that Komi has come to visit him. She offers to cook for him, but she embarrasses herself when she tries to spoon-feed him. Sometime later, Komi notices that Tadano has fallen asleep, so she goes to hold his hand, only to be interrupted by an arriving Najimi.
19	7	"It's just a misunderstanding." Transliteration: "Gokai desu." (Japanese: 誤解です。)	Sachiko Kanno	Yumi Suzumori	Sachiko Kanno	May 19, 2022	June 8, 2022
19	7	"It's just a hallucination." Transliteration: "Genkaku desu." (Japanese: 幻覚です。)	Sachiko Kanno	Yumi Suzumori	Sachiko Kanno	May 19, 2022	June 8, 2022
19	7	"It's just a narcissist." Transliteration: "Narushisuto desu." (Japanese: ナルシストです。)	Sachiko Kanno	Yumi Suzumori	Sachiko Kanno	May 19, 2022	June 8, 2022
19	7	"It's just a group decision for the school trip." Transliteration: "Shūgakuryokō no Han Kime desu." (Japanese: 修学旅行の班決めです。)	Sachiko Kanno	Yumi Suzumori	Sachiko Kanno	May 19, 2022	June 8, 2022
"It's just a misunderstanding.": Komi ponders if Najimi saw her holding Tadano's hand, so she writes a letter to them. However, she becomes embarrassed. "It's just a hallucination.": At school, after Komi hands Najimi the letter, Tadano asks her what she did after he called her, prompting her to flee. He then asks Najimi, who answers that Komi was checking his pulse. In the bathroom, Komi feels further embarrassment. "It's just a narcissist.": Shisuto Naruse, a narcissist, tries to approach Komi for the first time but is overwhelmed by their classmates. He leaves the room nervously, and outside, Komi gives him his fallen handkerchief. Delighted, he asks for her contact information, but she bolts away. He instead resorts to sending his selfies to Tadano. "It's just a group decision for the school trip.": Tadano asks Komi what places they should go on their upcoming school trip to Kyoto. On their walk home, Tadano notices Komi is feeling down, but she denies this. After they part ways, Komi calls Tadano when he is out of sight. She explains she is scared of going, as she felt excluded when her middle school class planned their trip. Tadano tells her she has real friends now and invites her to go together. She accepts, expressing her newfound enthusiasm to go.
20	8	"It's just the school field trip." Transliteration: "Shūgakuryokō desu." (Japanese: 修学旅行です。)	Mitsuo Hashimoto	Yumi Suzumori	Masashi Kojima	May 26, 2022	June 15, 2022
Komi arrives at the train station to meet with her friends. While on the train, the two girls in her group, Mikuni Katō and Ayami Sasaki, agree to make Komi's trip memorable. When class 1-1 arrives in Kyoto, they meet with their tour guide, Ryouko Tenjouin. However, she is quickly disheartened by the lack of interest from the class. Throughout the journey, Tenjouin maintains her composure, attempting to show the different locations to the class to no avail. However, she is reinvigorated when she notices Komi and Tadano are paying attention. Komi and Tadano later break away from the group to admire the local architecture together, much to Tenjouin's delight. The class then arrives at their hotel, where Komi and the girls bathe while she refuses Yamai's advances. Meanwhile, the boys ask Tadano to take pictures of them, and Komi finds herself confused when she sees Tadano's excitement. Back in their room, the girls have a pillow fight, which Komi participates in. However, they all pretend to be asleep when the teacher checks on them. Later that night, Komi is unable to fall asleep.
21	9	"It's just day 2 of the field trip." (Note: In the episode, it is titled "It's just the 2nd day of the field trip."); Transliteration: "Shūgakuryokō Ni-nichi-me desu." (Japanese: 修学旅行2日目です。)	Toshihiro Maeya	Yumi Suzumori	Masashi Kojima	June 2, 2022	June 22, 2022
Komi hangs out with Katō and Sasaki. However, they are late to accomplish their tight schedule. Before Katō and Sasaki can quarrel, Komi shows them their pictures thus far, which calms them down. Next, Komi dresses as a maiko and is made part of a street performance. Unaware of the situation, Sasaki "saves" Komi with her yo-yo skills. That night, Sasaki keeps denying that she was the person who saved Komi, but Katō finds evidence in her phone that she is a professional yo-yo artist. Sasaki finally agrees to show them her yo-yo skills when Komi thanks her for saving her. Later, while discussing crushes, Komi asks Katō and Sasaki what having one feels like, so they try to explain. Realizing she does have a crush, Komi writes the first letter of their name. The next day, when Komi falls asleep on the train, Katō and Sasaki set up a ruse to get her and Tadano together. After she wakes up on his shoulder, an embarrassed Komi immediately apologizes. Tadano then asks her if she enjoyed the trip, which she confirms.
22	10	"It's just Valentine's Day."; Transliteration: "Barentain desu." (Japanese: バレンタインです。)	Kazuki Kawagoe	Yumi Suzumori	Masashi Kojima	June 9, 2022	June 29, 2022
Onemine invites Komi to her house to make chocolates for Valentine's Day. Alongside Otori and Onemine's younger siblings, she bakes a chocolate cake. While they wait, the kids get Komi to talk and plead with her to use her voice more, which she accepts. At school, Komi receives chocolate from her friends and returns the ones she made. Meanwhile, Katai manages to give his to Tadano, while Komi feels guilty for being unable to do so. Tadano arrives home depressed, having not received any more chocolate, and Hitomi tries to cheer him up. When Tadano heads outside, he sees Komi. Sitting in a swing set, Tadano believes Komi will give him chocolate. However, she gives him a form sent by Najimi before they part ways. As Tadano wonders if Komi hates him, Komi forces herself to return to him and shout his name. She then gives him chocolate, much to Tadano's delight. However, after Komi tells him that this chocolate is the best from the batch she made, she bolts away in embarrassment.
23	11	"It's just ripped tights." Transliteration: "Densen desu." (Japanese: 伝線です。)	Erkin Kawabata	Deko Akao	Erkin Kawabata	June 16, 2022	July 6, 2022
23	11	"It's just an oni and her club." Transliteration: "Oninikanabō desu." (Japanese: 鬼に金棒です。)	Erkin Kawabata	Deko Akao	Erkin Kawabata	June 16, 2022	July 6, 2022
23	11	"It's just a pushover." Transliteration: "Amai desu." (Japanese: 甘いです。)	Erkin Kawabata	Deko Akao	Erkin Kawabata	June 16, 2022	July 6, 2022
23	11	"It's just a fight." Transliteration: "Kenka desu." (Japanese: ケンカです。)	Erkin Kawabata	Deko Akao	Erkin Kawabata	June 16, 2022	July 6, 2022
"It's just ripped tights.": At school, Komi's friends thank her for the chocolate. However, she dreads facing Tadano when she recalls what happened. During class, a small tear appears on one of Komi's tights, and Yamai ultimately gives her a new pair in the bathroom, which Komi thanks. However, Yamai wears Komi's torn tights on her head and runs off while Komi chases her, as a confused Tadano observes Komi's bare legs and accidentally sees up her skirt. "It's just an oni and her club.": Akako Onigashima, ordinarily friendly and energetic, gets periodically angrier when things do not go her way. When her earphones get tangled, she reaches her limit, but Komi helps her. Onigashima then invites Komi to the batting cage, solidifying their friendship. "It's just a pushover.": Amami Satou, a very sweet and calm girl, has trouble saying no to people. However, she finally learns to ask for help after interacting with Komi and Tadano. As such, they help Satou clean the classroom every morning. "It's just a fight.": Komi and Tadano fight for the first time after they cannot agree on how to solve a shogi problem proposed by Katō. However, after having separate conversations with Najimi and Katō, Tadano apologizes to Komi, which she smugly accepts.
24	12	"It's just White Day."; Transliteration: "Howaito Dē desu." (Japanese: ホワイトデーです。)	Haru Shinomiya	Deko Akao	Haru Shinomiya	June 23, 2022	July 13, 2022
24	12	"It has just been one year." Transliteration: "Ichi-Nenkan desu." (Japanese: 1年間です。)	Kazuki Kawagoe	Deko Akao	Masashi Kojima & Kazuki Kawagoe	June 23, 2022	July 13, 2022
"It's just White Day.": At home, Tadano thinks about what to give Komi for White Day. He asks Hitomi for help, but she believes his gift is meant for a boy, as she thinks Katai's chocolate was the only one he received. As such, Hitomi asks Tadano if he likes that person, to which he nervously answers. She then accompanies him to a department store. Tadano later goes to Komi's house, where Shuko greets him and meets Masayoshi. However, Komi arrives, nervously kicks her father out of her room, and tidies it up. Tadano gives her his gift, and Komi is delighted by the hand cream she receives. After Tadano leaves, Komi applies the cream to her hands. "It has just been one year.": At school, Komi and her classmates play a game where everyone's erasers are placed on a desk, and players must bump enemy erasers off them. Near the end, Najimi prepares to eliminate Komi but injures their finger, allowing Komi to win. After school, Komi and Tadano reflect on their approaching second year, but their moment is interrupted by Najimi. On their first day as second-years, Komi wishes that she and Tadano can have another good year.
