= Antonimina =

Antonimina Antonymina (Greek)
- Comune
- Comune di Antonimina
- Coat of arms

- Location of Antonimina in Italy Antonimina (Calabria)
- Coordinates: 38°16′N 16°9′E
- Country: Italy
- Region: Calabria
- Metropolitan city: Reggio Calabria (RC)
- Frazioni: Bagni Termali, San Nicola, Tre Arie

Government
  - Mayor: Antonio Condeli

Area
  - Total: 22.91 km^{2} (8.85 sq mi)
- Elevation: 327 m (1,073 ft)

Population (31 August 2015)
  - Total: 1,322
  - Density: 57.70/km^{2} (149.5/sq mi)
- Demonym: Antoniminesi
- Time zone: UTC+1 (CET)
  - Summer (DST): UTC+2 (CEST)
- Postal code: 89040
- Dialing code: 0964
- Patron saint: St. Nicholas
- Saint day: 6 December
- Website: Official website

Antonimina is a comune (municipality) in the Metropolitan City of Reggio Calabria in the Italian region Calabria, located about 80 kilometres (50 mi) southwest of Catanzaro and about 45 kilometres (28 mi) northeast of Reggio Calabria.

Antonimina borders the following municipalities: Ciminà, Cittanova, Gerace, Locri, Portigliola, Sant'Ilario dello Ionio.
