= Sant'Ilario dello Ionio =

Sant'Ilario dello Ionio Santu Lariu
- Comune
- Comune di Sant'Ilario dello Ionio
- Location within Italy Location within Calabria
- Coordinates: 38°13′N 16°12′E
- Country: Italy
- Region: Calabria
- Metropolitan city: Reggio Calabria (RC)

Government
  - Mayor: Pasquale Brizzi

Area
  - Total: 13.8 km^{2} (5.3 sq mi)

Population (Dec. 2004)
  - Total: 1,346
  - Density: 97.5/km^{2} (253/sq mi)
- Time zone: UTC+1 (CET)
  - Summer (DST): UTC+2 (CEST)
- Postal code: 89040
- Dialing code: 0964
- Website: Official website

Sant'Ilario dello Ionio (Sicilian: Santu Lariu) is a local municipality in the Province of Reggio Calabria in the Italian region Calabria, located about 105 kilometres (65 mi) southwest of Catanzaro and about 85 kilometres (53 mi) east of Reggio Calabria. As of 31 December 2004, it had a population of 1,346 and an area of 13.8 square kilometres (5.3 mi^{2}).

Sant'Ilario dello Ionio borders the following municipalities: Antonimina, Ardore, Ciminà, Locri, Portigliola. Three different communities are found in this municipality: the ancient borgo di Condojanni, Sant'Ilario centro and la Marina. In the municipality act a Youth municipality committee an autonomous organism based on an open and informal model of free youth participation recognized in the statute of the municipality and supported by European Commission.

== Demographic evolution ==
Historical population

Year	Pop.	±%
1861	1,753	—
1871	2,009	+14.6%
1881	2,270	+13.0%
1901	2,384	+5.0%
1911	2,394	+0.4%

Year	Pop.	±%
1921	2,620	+9.4%
1931	2,635	+0.6%
1936	2,872	+9.0%
1951	2,989	+4.1%
1961	2,358	−21.1%

Year	Pop.	±%
1971	1,866	−20.9%
1981	1,607	−13.9%
1991	1,565	−2.6%
2001	1,389	−11.2%

Source: Data from ISTAT
