= Portigliola =

Portigliola Greek: Portula
- Comune
- Comune di Portigliola
- Location within Italy Location within Calabria
- Coordinates: 38°14′N 16°12′E
- Country: Italy
- Region: Calabria
- Metropolitan city: Reggio Calabria (RC)

Area
  - Total: 6.0 km^{2} (2.3 sq mi)

Population (Dec. 2004)
  - Total: 1,297
  - Density: 220/km^{2} (560/sq mi)
- Time zone: UTC+1 (CET)
  - Summer (DST): UTC+2 (CEST)
- Postal code: 89040
- Dialing code: 0964
- Website: Official website

Portigliola (Calabrian: Portigghiòla) is a comune (municipality) in the Province of Reggio Calabria in the Italian region Calabria, located about 80 kilometres (50 mi) southwest of Catanzaro and about 50 kilometres (31 mi) northeast of Reggio Calabria. As of 31 December 2004, it had a population of 1,297 and an area of 6.0 square kilometres (2.3 mi^{2}).

Portigliola borders the following municipalities: Antonimina, Locri, Sant'Ilario dello Ionio.

== Demographic evolution ==
Historical population

Year	Pop.	±%
1861	1,445	—
1871	1,628	+12.7%
1881	1,684	+3.4%
1901	1,836	+9.0%
1911	2,047	+11.5%

Year	Pop.	±%
1921	2,729	+33.3%
1931	2,633	−3.5%
1936	2,297	−12.8%
1951	2,348	+2.2%
1961	2,006	−14.6%

Year	Pop.	±%
1971	1,654	−17.5%
1981	1,577	−4.7%
1991	1,356	−14.0%
2001	1,343	−1.0%

Source: Data from ISTAT
