= Varapodio =

Varapodio Greek: Varapodion
- Comune
- Comune di Varapodio
- Coat of arms

- Location within Italy Location within Calabria
- Coordinates: 38°19′N 15°59′E
- Country: Italy
- Region: Calabria
- Metropolitan city: Reggio Calabria (RC)

Government
  - Mayor: Orlando Fazzolari

Area
  - Total: 29.0 km^{2} (11.2 sq mi)
- Elevation: 208 m (682 ft)

Population (31 May 2010)
  - Total: 2,243
  - Density: 77.3/km^{2} (200/sq mi)
- Demonym: Varapodiesi
- Time zone: UTC+1 (CET)
  - Summer (DST): UTC+2 (CEST)
- Postal code: 89010
- Dialing code: 0966
- Patron saint: St. Nicholas of Bari, Our Lady of Mount Carmel
- Saint day: December 6 and November 16
- Website: Official website

Varapodio (Calabrian: Marrapòdi; Greek: Bαραποδιον, romanized: Varapodion) is a comune (municipality) in the Province of Reggio Calabria in the southern Italian region Calabria, located about 80 kilometres (50 mi) southwest of Catanzaro and about 35 kilometres (22 mi) northeast of Reggio Calabria.

Varapodio, 20 kilometres (12 mi) from the coast of Gioia Tauro, is one of the towns on the plains of Gioia Tauro. It borders the following municipalities: Ciminà, Molochio, Oppido Mamertina, Platì, Taurianova, Terranova Sappo Minulio.

A strong historical connection exists between the Calabrian town of Varapodio and the rural Victorian community of Cobram. Beginning in the late 19th century, and accelerating after the Second World War, many families from Varapodio migrated to Cobram, drawn by opportunities in agriculture along the Murray River. Over time, these settlers and their descendants established a vibrant Italo-Australian community, helping to shape Cobram’s cultural and social life. The influence of Varapodio remains evident in local traditions, family networks, and community institutions, leading some to affectionately describe Cobram as a ‘Little Varapodio.’”

== Etymology ==
The name of the town has evolved over the ages. Originally it was called Marrapodi, derived from the Greek 'Mαραποδιον', or Marrapodion, possibly meaning 'heavy-footed'. Another theory put forward by Don Antonino Di Masi is that the name is derived from the local river called Marro. It was later called Barapodi by the local Greek-speaking Orthodox Christians who inhabited the town, then to the Latinised Baropedium during the 14th to 16th centuries. In modern times, it was regularly called Varapodi, and then finally to Varapodio in 1811, although Varapodi is still used in the local dialect.

== History ==
The ancient Varapodio was located three kilometres from its present location, in an area called Il Salvatore. According to the tradition, town was founded in 951 CE by inhabitants fleeing Islamic attacks on along the coast. By the 17th century, the town had shifted to its present location, where there were already a few established churches founded by the Augustinian Fathers. The town attained autonomy by Royal Decree number 922 on May 4, 1811.

Varapodio experienced significant levels of emigration during the 1950s to 1960s, with communities of emigrants settling in Northern Italy, the United States, Canada and within Australia, principally Sydney, Melbourne, Adelaide, Cobram, Shepparton and Swan Hill. Today, agriculture is still the driving force behind the economy of the town, although industry is present with factories specializing in processing oranges and olives.
