= Ciminà =

Ciminà Greek: Kymina
- Comune
- Comune di Ciminà
- Location within Italy Location within Calabria
- Coordinates: 38°15′N 16°8′E
- Country: Italy
- Region: Calabria
- Metropolitan city: Reggio Calabria (RC)

Area
  - Total: 48.8 km^{2} (18.8 sq mi)

Population (Dec. 2004)
  - Total: 652
  - Density: 13.4/km^{2} (34.6/sq mi)
- Time zone: UTC+1 (CET)
  - Summer (DST): UTC+2 (CEST)
- Postal code: 89040
- Dialing code: 0964
- Website: Official website

Ciminà (Greek: Kymina) is a comune (municipality) in the Province of Reggio Calabria in the Italian region Calabria, located about 80 kilometres (50 mi) southwest of Catanzaro and about 45 kilometres (28 mi) northeast of Reggio Calabria. As of 31 December 2004, it had a population of 652 and an area of 48.8 square kilometres (18.8 mi^{2}).

Ciminà borders the following municipalities: Antonimina, Ardore, Cittanova, Molochio, Platì, Sant'Ilario dello Ionio, Varapodio.

== Demographic evolution ==
Historical population

Year	Pop.	±%
1861	1,915	—
1871	1,881	−1.8%
1881	2,022	+7.5%
1901	2,243	+10.9%
1911	2,179	−2.9%

Year	Pop.	±%
1921	2,116	−2.9%
1931	2,172	+2.6%
1936	2,230	+2.7%
1951	2,207	−1.0%
1961	1,742	−21.1%

Year	Pop.	±%
1971	1,310	−24.8%
1981	975	−25.6%
1991	838	−14.1%
2001	683	−18.5%

Source: Data from ISTAT
