= Taurianova =

- Comune
- Comune di Taurianova
- Location within Italy Location within Calabria
- Coordinates: 38°21′N 16°1′E
- Country: Italy
- Region: Calabria
- Metropolitan city: Reggio Calabria (RC)
- Frazioni: San Martino, Amato, Pegara, Donna Livia

Area
  - Total: 47.8 km^{2} (18.5 sq mi)
- Elevation: 210 m (690 ft)

Population (Dec. 2004)
  - Total: 15,933
  - Density: 333/km^{2} (863/sq mi)
- Demonym: taurianovesi
- Time zone: UTC+1 (CET)
  - Summer (DST): UTC+2 (CEST)
- Postal code: 89029
- Dialing code: 0966
- Patron saint: Maria of Mountain
- Saint day: september, 8
- Website: Official website

Taurianova is a comune (municipality) in the Province of Reggio Calabria in the southern Italian region Calabria, located about 80 kilometres (50 mi) southwest of Catanzaro and about 40 kilometres (25 mi) northeast of Reggio Calabria.

As of 31 December 2004, it had a population of 15,933 and an area of 47.8 square kilometres (18.5 mi^{2}).

Taurianova borders the municipalities Cittanova, Molochio, Oppido Mamertina, Rizziconi, Terranova Sappo Minulio and Varapodio.

The municipality of Taurianova contains the frazioni (subdivisions, mainly villages and hamlets) San Martino, Amato, Pegara and Donna Livia.

Taurianova is famous for handmade nougat.

Taurianova was the location of a bloody ’ndrangheta war in 1991. Eight people were murdered in three days in May 1991 and one victim had his head cut off in front of his own butcher shop.

== Demographic evolution ==
Historical population

Year	Pop.	±%
1861	7,608	—
1871	8,701	+14.4%
1881	9,637	+10.8%
1901	11,926	+23.8%
1911	14,136	+18.5%

Year	Pop.	±%
1921	16,638	+17.7%
1931	17,717	+6.5%
1936	17,132	−3.3%
1951	19,456	+13.6%
1961	17,742	−8.8%

Year	Pop.	±%
1971	16,078	−9.4%
1981	15,591	−3.0%
1991	16,056	+3.0%
2001	15,799	−1.6%

Source: Data from ISTAT
