= San Martino di Taurianova =

- Frazione
- Location of San Martino di Taurianova in Italy
- Coordinates: 38°21′36″N 15°58′31″E
- Country: Italy
- Region: Calabria
- Province: Reggio Calabria
- Comune: Taurianova
- Elevation: 135 m (443 ft)

Population
  - Total: 2,000
- Demonym: sammartinesi
- Time zone: UTC+1 (CET)
  - Summer (DST): UTC+2 (CEST)
- Postal code: 89029
- Dialing code: +39 (0966)
- Patron saint: Martin of Tours
- Saint day: November 11

San Martino is a frazione of the comune of Taurianova of about 2,000 inhabitants situated in the Province of Reggio Calabria.

== History ==
The origins of San Martino dates back to the mid of 10th century, by refugees of ancient Tauriana, destroyed by the Saracen.

During the Normans domination, San Martino became the seat of one of the most important castles of the kingdom.

The city was completely destroyed during the 1783 Calabrian earthquakes.

== Famous people ==
- Domenico Caruso (March 25, 1933 - November 23, 2025) Noted scholar of the Calabrian dialects.
- Giulio Nasso (November 28, 1906 – October 23, 1999) Emigrated to New York at age 18 has become a famous American builder.
