= Terranova Sappo Minulio =

- Comune
- Comune di Terranova Sappo Minulio
- Location within Italy Location within Calabria
- Coordinates: 38°19′N 16°0′E
- Country: Italy
- Region: Calabria
- Metropolitan city: Reggio Calabria (RC)

Area
  - Total: 9.0 km^{2} (3.5 sq mi)
- Elevation: 250 m (820 ft)

Population (Dec. 2004)
  - Total: 556
  - Density: 62/km^{2} (160/sq mi)
- Time zone: UTC+1 (CET)
  - Summer (DST): UTC+2 (CEST)
- Postal code: 89010
- Dialing code: 0966
- Website: Official website

Terranova Sappo Minulio is a comune (municipality) in the Province of Reggio Calabria in the Italian region Calabria, located about 80 kilometres (50 mi) southwest of Catanzaro and about 35 kilometres (22 mi) northeast of Reggio Calabria. As of 31 December 2004, it had a population of 556 and an area of 9.0 square kilometres (3.5 mi^{2}).

Terranova Sappo Minulio borders the following municipalities: Molochio, Taurianova, Varapodio.

A small community of Italians from Terranova Sappo Minulio can be found in Sydney, Australia along with their descendants.

== Demographic evolution ==
Historical population

Year	Pop.	±%
1861	964	—
1871	1,111	+15.2%
1881	1,156	+4.1%
1901	1,461	+26.4%
1911	1,666	+14.0%

Year	Pop.	±%
1921	1,761	+5.7%
1931	1,489	−15.4%
1936	1,578	+6.0%
1951	1,285	−18.6%
1961	1,039	−19.1%

Year	Pop.	±%
1971	751	−27.7%
1981	668	−11.1%
1991	545	−18.4%
2001	537	−1.5%

Source: Data from ISTAT
