= Domenico Caruso =

Italian poet and writer (1933–2025)

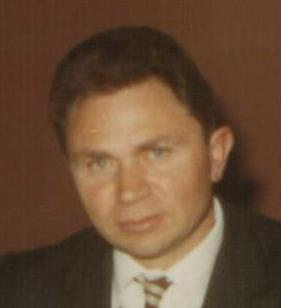
- Domenico Caruso
- Born: 25 March 1933; San Martino di Taurianova, Italy
- Died: 23 November 2025 (aged 92); San Martino di Taurianova, Italy
- Occupations: Poet, writer
- Website: www.brutium.info

Domenico Caruso (25 March 1933 – 23 November 2025) was an Italian poet and writer. He was a noted scholar of the Calabrian dialects, the language in which he composed many of his works. Caruso died on 23 November 2025, at the age of 92.

== Main works ==
- Primi abbozzi, Ed. Formica, 1961
- Liriche e satire, Ed. G. Lucente, 1963
- La Calabria e il suo poeta, Ed. Ursini, 1978
- Calabria mia - Alla scoperta dell'antica saggezza, Centro Studi S. Martino, 1988
- Storia e Folklore Calabrese, Centro Studi S. Martino, 1988
- S. Martino: un paese e un Santo & Il miglior folk calabrese, Centro Studi S. Martino, 2000
- Martino di Tours - Il Santo della Carità , Centro Studi S. Martino, 2007
- Calabria da scoprire, Il mio libro, 2012
- Il dolore, la morte & la speranza, Il mio libro, 2012
- La nostra storia, Il mio libro, 2012
- Uomini illustri di Calabria, Il mio libro, 2012
- Usi, tradizioni e costumi di Calabria, Il mio libro, 2012
- Storia, Folklore & Riflessioni, Il mio libro, 2013
- Storie, memorie e riflessioni, Il mio libro, 2013
- La Vita è preghiera, Il mio libro, 2014
- Almanacco calabrese, Il mio libro, 2015
- E’ della Calabria il miglior folk, Il mio libro, 2015
- La Piana di Gioia Tauro, Il mio libro, 2015
- Nonno, raccontaci una storia, Il mio libro, 2015
- Il cuore e la parola, Il mio libro, 2016
- Calabria da scoprire, Il mio libro, 2017
- Folklore di Calabria... e non solo, Youcanprint, 2017
- Il Divino Maestro, Youcanprint, 2017
- Sulle orme di Gesù, Youcanprint, 2017
- Viaggio alla scoperta della Calabria, Il mio libro, 2017
- Calabresi illustri... e non solo , Youcanprint, 2018
- Quaderno n.6, Centro Studi Bruttium, 2021
- Quaderno n.8, Centro Studi Bruttium, 2021
- Quaderno n 36, Centro Studi Bruttium, 2022
- Retrospettiva poetica del Centro Studi Bruttium di CZ - 02/2023
- Il valore dei ricordi del Centro Studi Bruttium di CZ - 04/2023

== Poetry ==
- 'U barveri
- A' funtana
- A' stada
- Calabrisi jeu sugnu e mi 'ndi vantu
- Gnuri e pezzenti

== Awards ==
- Mondo domani (1963)
- Alla ricerca del folk italiano (1972)
- Era Lacinia (1973)
