= Molochio =

Molochio Griko: Molòcha
- Comune
- Comune di Molochio
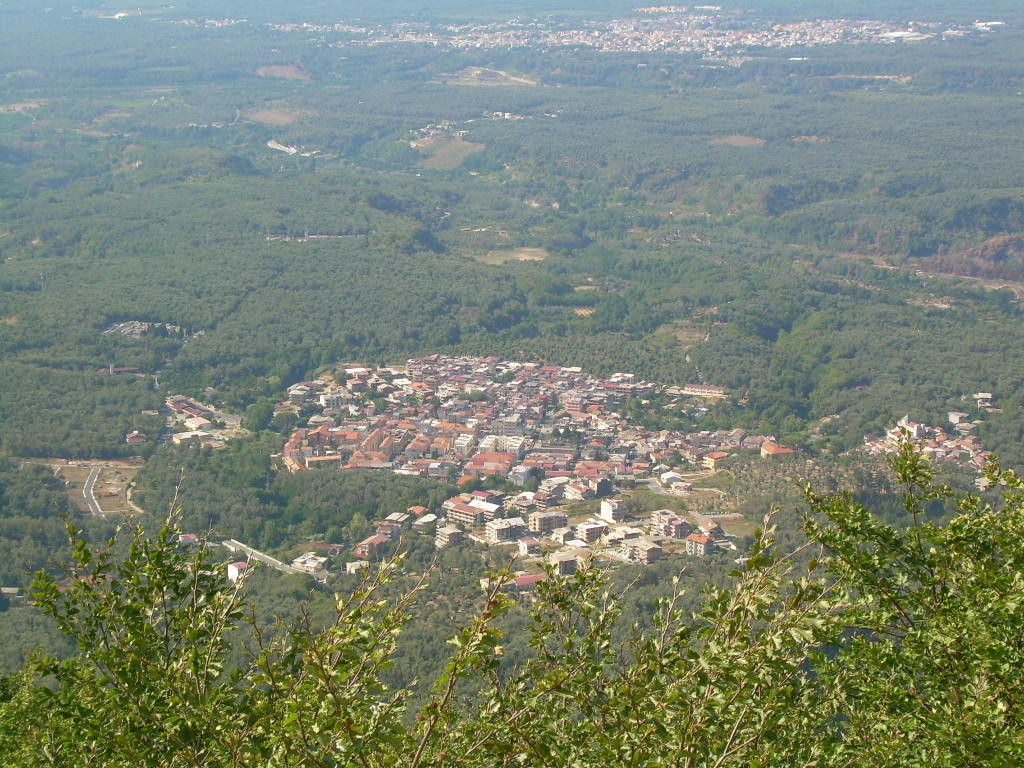

- Location within Italy Location within Calabria
- Coordinates: 38°19′N 16°2′E
- Country: Italy
- Region: Calabria
- Metropolitan city: Reggio Calabria (RC)

Area
  - Total: 37.3 km^{2} (14.4 sq mi)

Population (Dec. 2004)
  - Total: 2,700
  - Density: 72/km^{2} (190/sq mi)
- Time zone: UTC+1 (CET)
  - Summer (DST): UTC+2 (CEST)
- Postal code: 89010
- Dialing code: 0966
- Patron saint: Saint Joshep
- Saint day: 19 march
- Website: www.molochio.eu

Molochio (Greek: Μολὸχα, romanized: Molòcha) is a comune (municipality) in the Province of Reggio Calabria in the Italian region Calabria, located about 80 kilometres (50 mi) southwest of Catanzaro and about 40 kilometres (25 mi) northeast of Reggio Calabria. As of 31 December 2004, it had a population of 2,700 and an area of 37.3 square kilometres (14.4 mi^{2}). It is known for "having one of the highest prevalences of centenarians in the world".

Molochio borders the following municipalities: Ciminà, Cittanova, Taurianova, Terranova Sappo Minulio, Varapodio.

== Demographic evolution ==
Historical population

Year	Pop.	±%
1861	2,162	—
1871	2,806	+29.8%
1881	2,864	+2.1%
1901	3,438	+20.0%
1911	3,662	+6.5%

Year	Pop.	±%
1921	3,950	+7.9%
1931	4,346	+10.0%
1936	4,441	+2.2%
1951	4,393	−1.1%
1961	4,003	−8.9%

Year	Pop.	±%
1971	3,342	−16.5%
1981	3,201	−4.2%
1991	3,078	−3.8%
2001	2,803	−8.9%

Source: Data from ISTAT
