= Giulio Nasso =

Italian-American builder

- Born: November 28, 1906; San Martino di Taurianova, Italy
- Died: October 23, 1999 (aged 92); New York City
- Known for: construction

Giulio Nasso (November 28, 1906 in San Martino di Taurianova – October 23, 1999 in New York) was an Italian-American builder.

Nasso emigrated from Calabria, Italy to New York at age 18.

== Most famous buildings ==
- Madison Square Garden
- General Motors Building
