= Roasted sweet potato =

Popular street food in East Asia

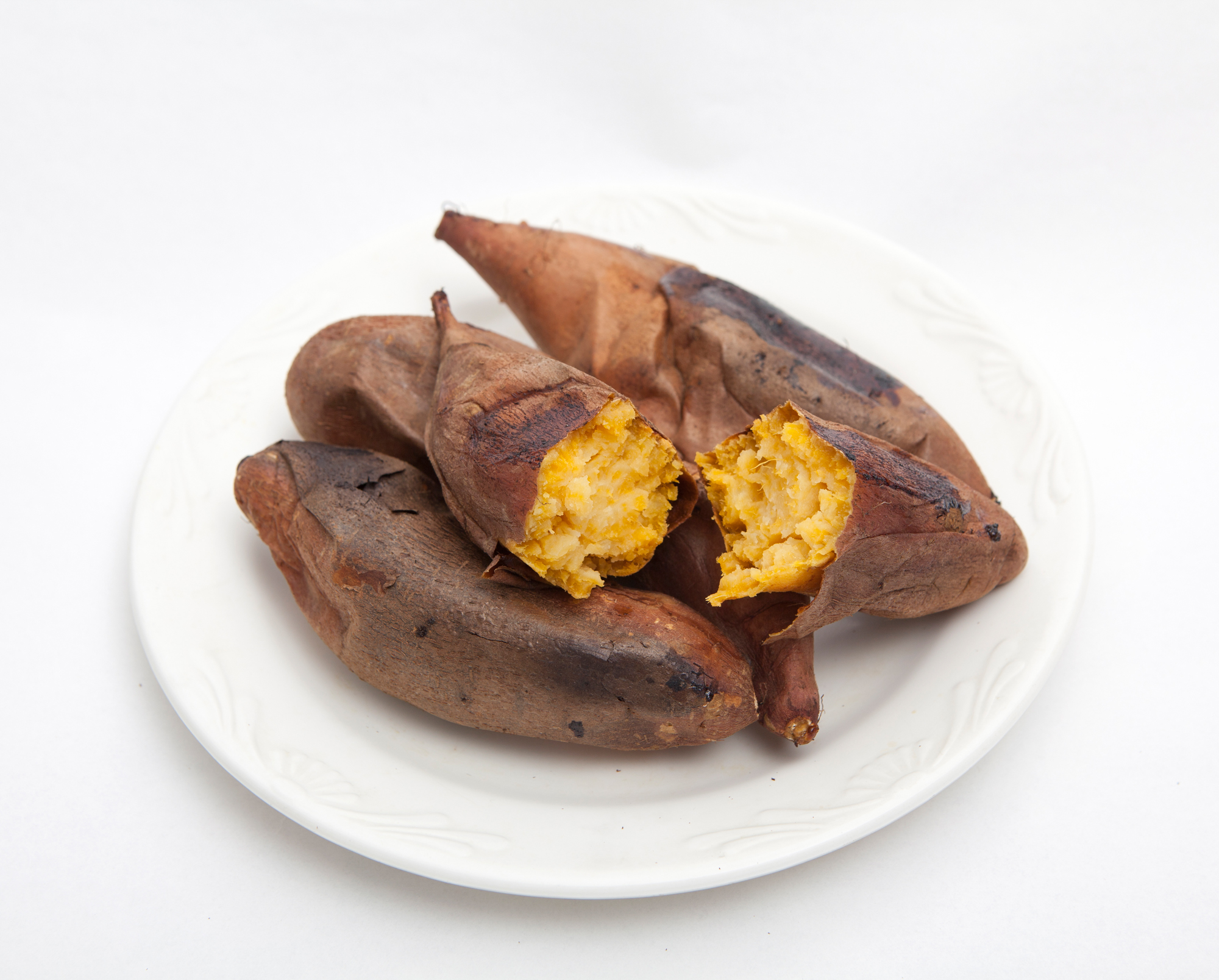
- Alternative names: Gun-goguma, kǎo-báishǔ, wui-faansyu, yaki-imo
- Place of origin: East Asia (China, Japan, Korea); Southeast Asia (Vietnam)
- Main ingredients: Sweet potatoes
- Similar dishes: Roasted chestnut
- Other information: Unicode emoji 🍠

Regional names

Chinese name (northern China)
- Chinese: 烤白薯
Transcriptions
Standard Mandarin
- Hanyu Pinyin: kǎo-báishǔ
- Wade–Giles: k'ao^{3} pai^{2}shu^{3}

Alternative Chinese name
- Chinese: 烤地瓜
Transcriptions
Standard Mandarin
- Hanyu Pinyin: kǎo-dìguā
- Wade–Giles: k'ao^{3} ti^{4}kwa^{1}

Cantonese name
- Chinese: 煨番薯
Transcriptions
Yue: Cantonese
- Yale Romanization: wui-faan-syu

Vietnamese name
- Vietnamese: khoai lang nướng

Korean name
- Hangul: 군고구마
Transcriptions
- Revised Romanization: gungoguma
- McCune–Reischauer: kun'goguma

Japanese name
- Kanji: 焼き芋
- Kana: やきいも
Transcriptions
- Revised Hepburn: yaki-imo

Roasted sweet potato is a popular winter street food in East Asia and parts of Southeast Asia.

== Regions ==
=== China, Hong Kong, and Taiwan ===
In China, yellow-fleshed sweet potatoes are roasted in a large iron drum and sold as street food during winter. They are called kǎo-báishǔ (烤白薯; "roasted sweet potato") in northern China, wui faan syu (煨番薯) in Cantonese-speaking regions, and kǎo-dìguā (烤地瓜) in Taiwan and Northeast China, as the name of sweet potatoes themselves varies across the sinophone world.

In 2021, Hong Kong chef Lucas Sin went viral for posting about a traditional Chinese method of roasting sweet potatoes, where the potato is first frozen before being roasted until caramelized sugars bleed through the skin.

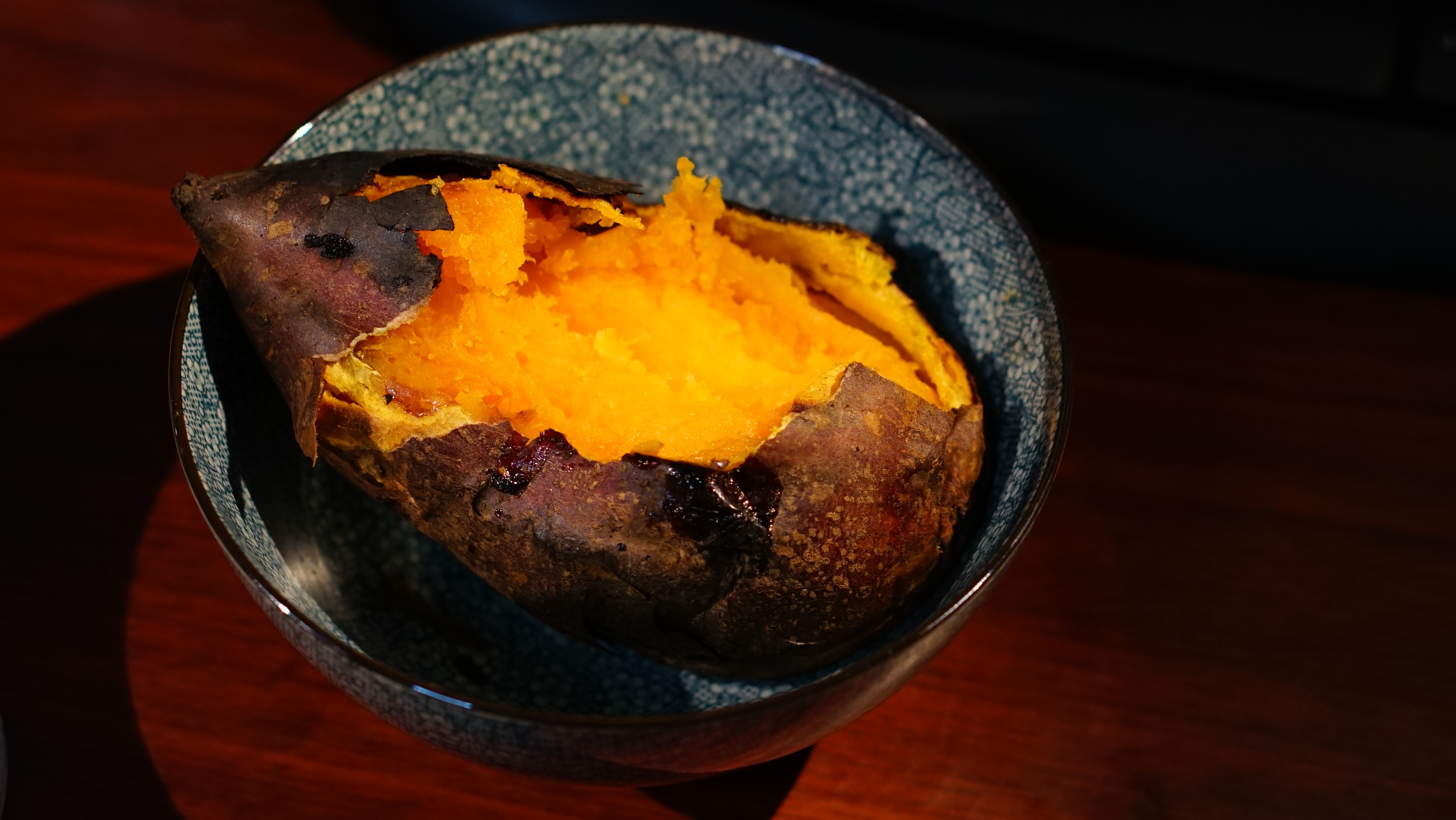
Roasted sweet potato from China

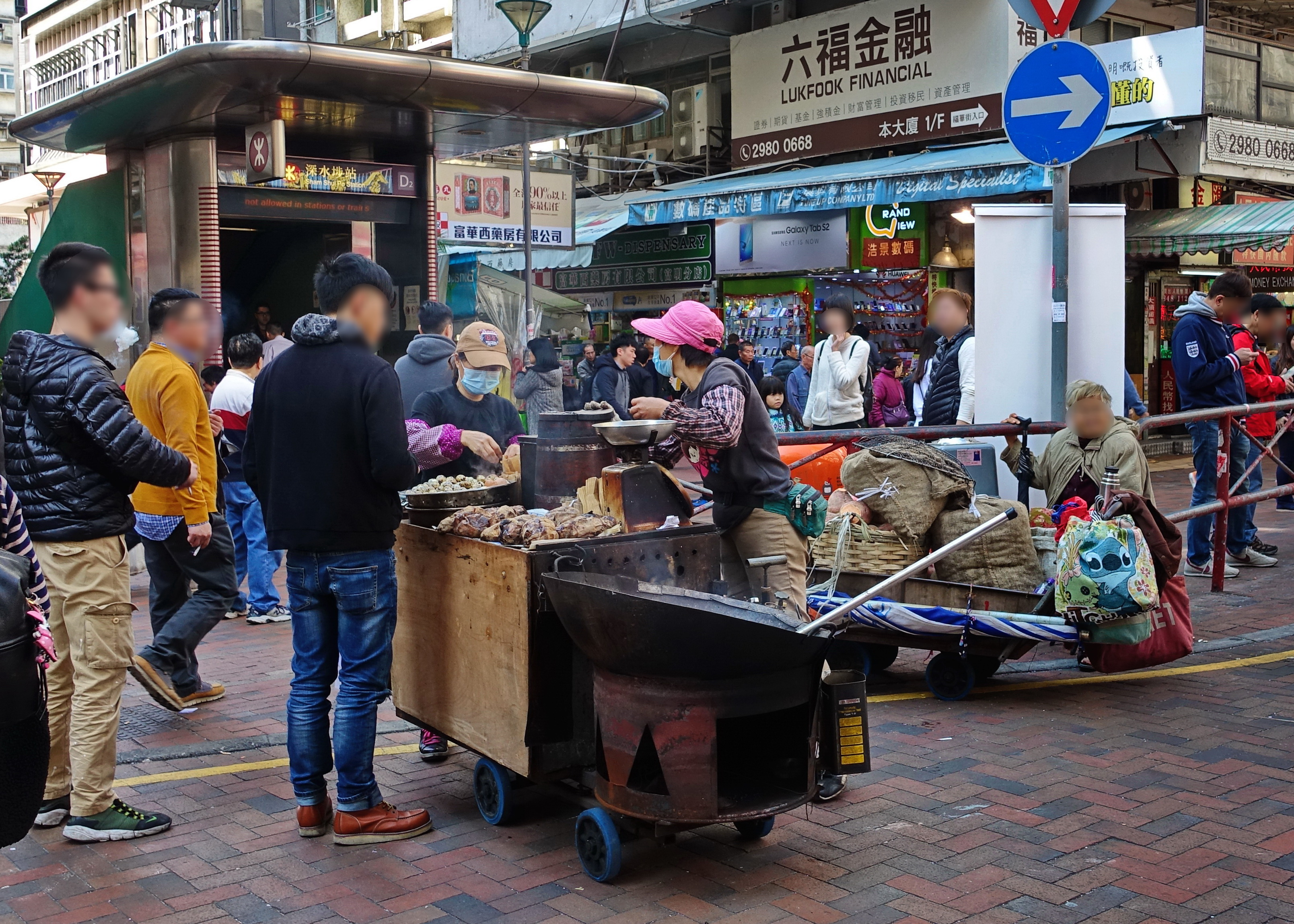
Roasted sweet potato hawker in Hong Kong

=== Korea ===
Sweet potatoes roasted in drum cans, called gun-goguma (군고구마), are popular in both North and South Korea. The food is sold from late autumn to winter by vendors wearing ushanka, which is sometimes referred to as "roasted sweet potato vendor hat" or "roasted chestnut vendor hat". Although any type of goguma (sweet potato) can be roasted, softer, moist varieties such as hobak-goguma (pumpkin sweet potato) are preferred over firmer, floury varieties such as bam-goguma ("chestnut sweet potato") for roasting.

In South Korea, roasted sweet potatoes are dried to make gun-goguma-mallaengi (군고구마 말랭이) and frozen to make ice-gun-goguma (아이스 군고구마). Although gun-goguma has traditionally been a winter food, gun-goguma ice cream and gun-goguma smoothies are nowadays enjoyed in summer.

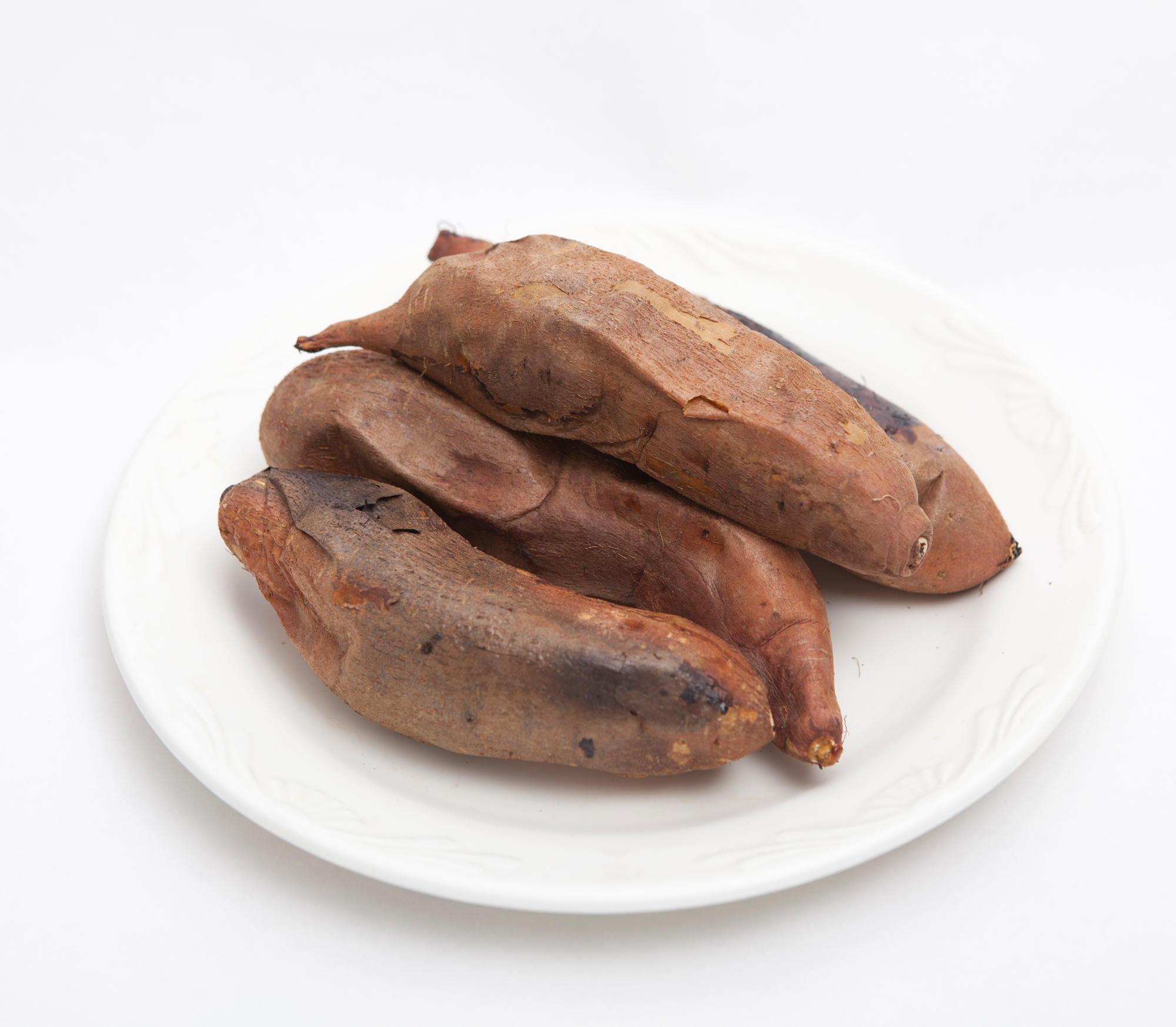
Gun-goguma

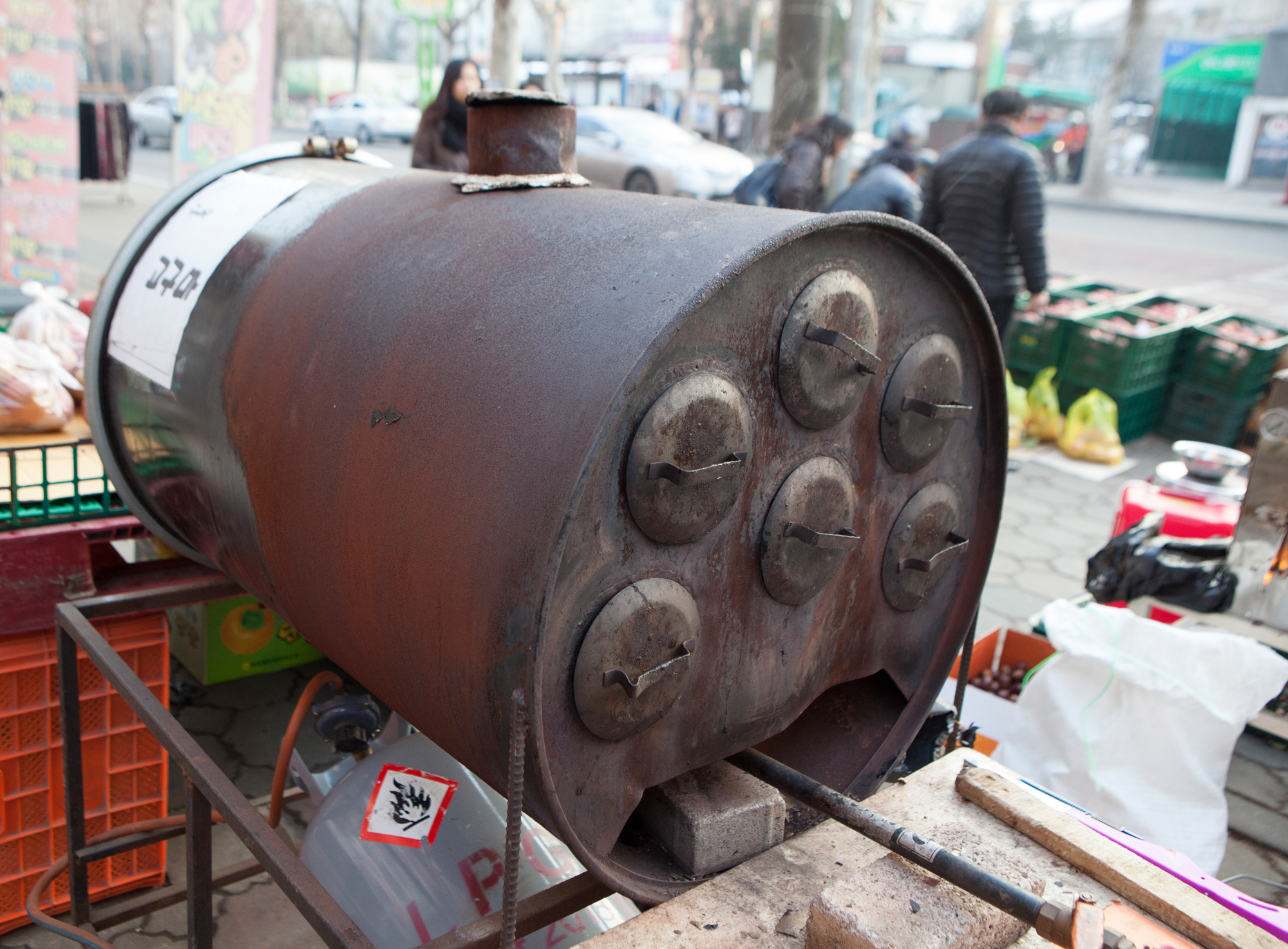
Typical gun-goguma drum can in Korea

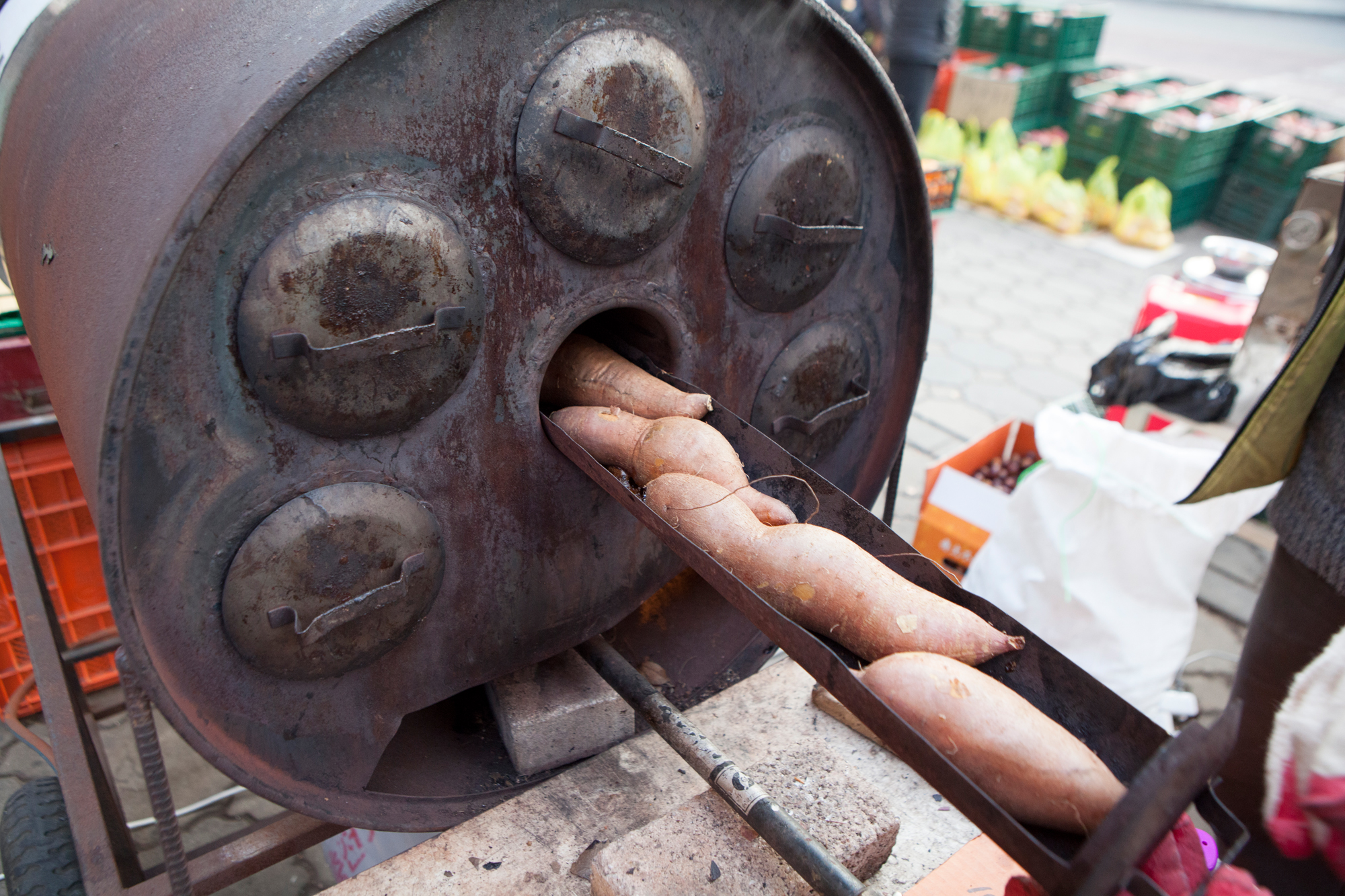
Roasting goguma in a drum can

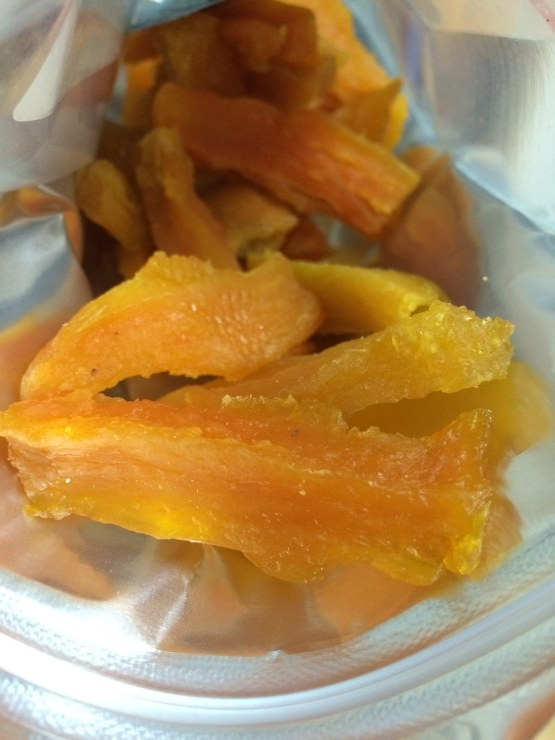
Gun-goguma-mallaengi (half-dried roasted sweet potatoes) as a snack

=== Japan ===
In Japan, a similar street food is called ishi yaki-imo (石焼き芋; "roasted sweet potato in heat stones") and sold from trucks during the winter.

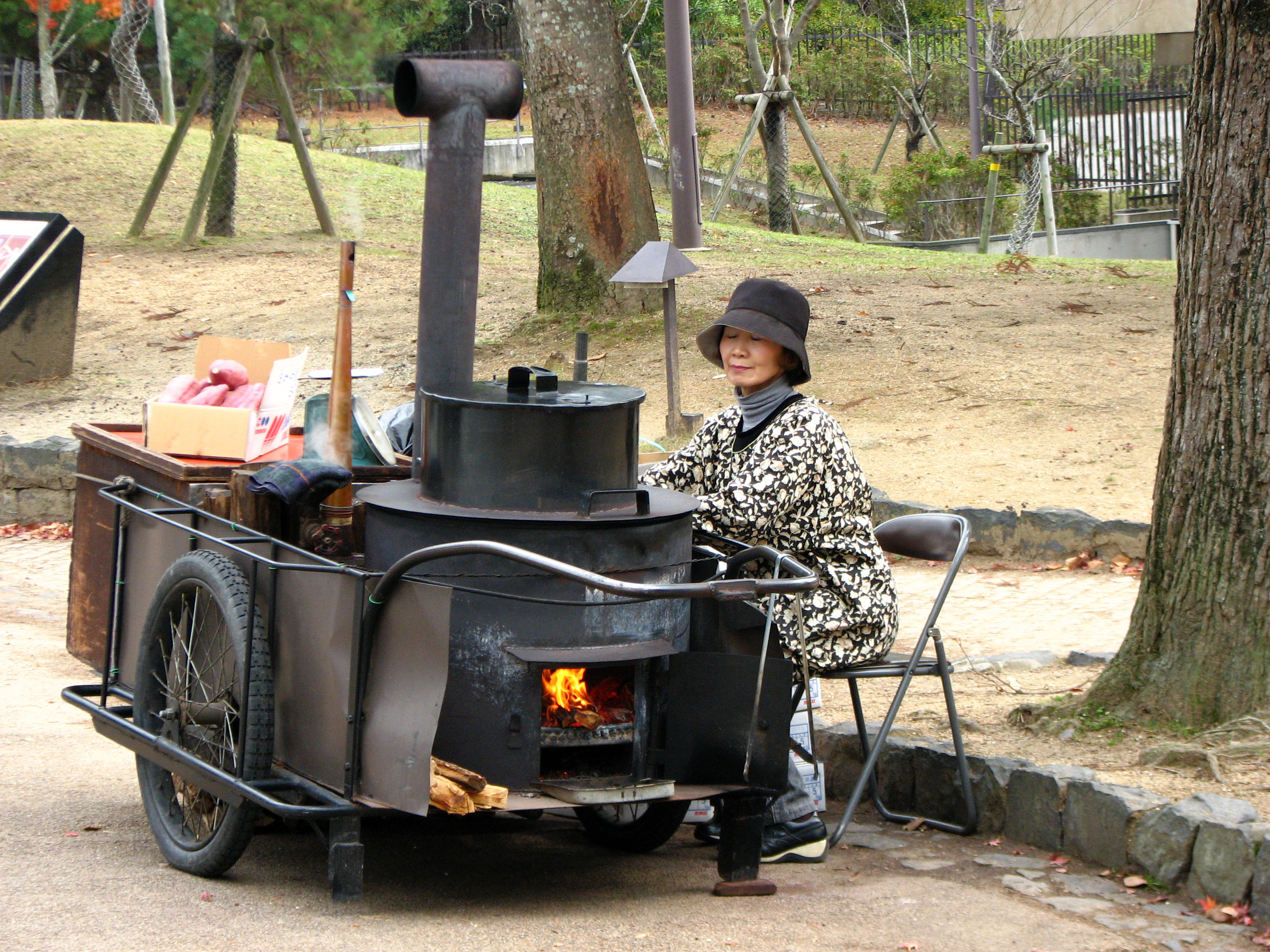
yaki-imo vendor in Nara, Japan

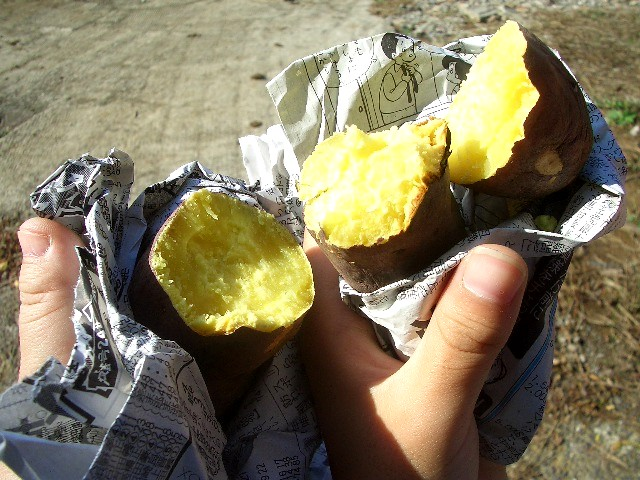
Stone-baked potato wrapped in newspaper is a common style in Japan.

=== Northern Vietnam ===
Roasted sweet potato (khoai lang nướng) is a popular winter street food in Hanoi and Northern Vietnam.

== Emoji ==
In 2010, an emoji was approved for Unicode 6.0 U+1F360 🍠 ROASTED SWEET POTATO for "roasted sweet potato".

== See also ==
- List of sweet potato dishes
- Roasted chestnut
