= Insurrection of 1847 in the Two Sicilies =

1847 revolts in the Kingdom of the Two Sicilies

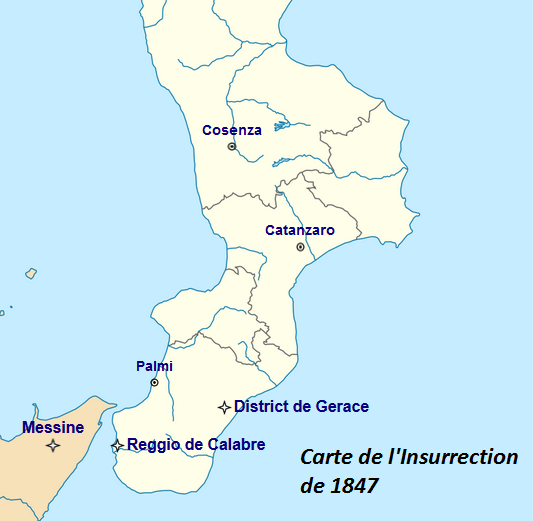
Map of Southern Italy with the cities of Messina, Reggio Calabria and Gerace and the cities in the north that the rebels were planning to take.

The Insurrection of 1847 in the Two Sicilies is a series of three revolts that happened in September 1847 in the Kingdom of the Two Sicilies. Its aim was the unification of Italy and the establishment of either a constitutional monarchy or a republic. The insurrection is often considered as a continuation of the Neapolitan revolution of 1820 and at the same time as a foretaste of the Sicilian revolution of 1848 and of the spring of nations.

== The three revolts ==
Planning for the uprising of 1847 began in 1843 within a network of liberal and carbonari committees meeting secretly in Naples, at the time the capital of the kingdom. One of the leaders of these committees was the poet and activist Carlo Poerio. The insurrection had been initially planned for the end of 1844, but this was disrupted by the unexpected failed attempt of the Bandiera brothers to take over Calabria. Finally, after long negotiations and the gathering of weapons and powder, it was eventually decided that three simultaneous uprisings would take place: one in Sicily (more precisely in Messina), and two in the southern part of Calabria: in Reggio Calabria and in the district of Gerace. The plan was that the rebels would then move toward the North to liberate Palmi, Catanzaro, Cosenza and eventually Naples.

The revolt of Messina was the first to take place, on September 1, 1847. However, it was crushed the same day by the local military authorities, with most of the leaders of the revolt, including the historian Carlo Gemelli, fleeing to Malta. The revolt continued through the following days in neighboring rural villages in the mountains, such as in Novara di Sicilia, although without much success.

On the September 2, the planned uprisings broke out in Reggio Calabria and in the district of Gerace. The Reggio revolt started in the village of Santo Stefano in Aspromonte, from which 500 men led by Domenico Romeo (1796–1847) marched on the city of Reggio Calabria. On the 3rd of September, the rebels took over the Reggio castle as well as the prison of San Francesco, and instituted an 'insurrectional junta'. Learning about the insurrection, King Ferdinand II of the Two Sicilies sent two warships which arrived at Reggio on the 4th and started bombarding the city. The authorities reacted harshly, with four leaders of the rebellion shot while Domenico Romeo was captured and then beheaded.

The revolt in the district of Gerace, which started at the same time as the Reggio revolt, lasted until the 6th of September with the main leaders being captured only on the 15th. Starting in the villages of Sant'Agata del Bianco and Bianco, the insurgents then marched on Caraffa del Bianco, Bovalino, Ardore, Siderno, Gioiosa Ionica and Roccella Ionica, covering a distance of more than 45 kilometers. In each of these towns, they proclaimed the repeal the taxes on imports and exports, and a reduction by half of the costs of salt and tobacco. They also captured the Intendant of the district of Gerace, Antonio Bonafede, a known reactionary. However, on the 6th of September—due to the arrival of a warship and news of the imminent arrival of Royal military troops directed by general Ferdinando Nunziante—the insurgents disbanded and the leaders of the revolt fled northward to the mountains, hiding in a cave in the valley of Caulonia. On the 15th of September, a local peasant named Nicola Ciccarello informed the authorities of the insurgents' hiding place, leading to their capture. The five main leaders of the Gerace revolt—Rocco Verduci, Michele Bello, Pietro Mazzoni, Gaetano Ruffo and Domenico Salvadori—were arrested, and after a trial they were executed in Gerace on the October 2, 1847. They are today remembered as the Five Martyrs of Gerace (in Italian: Cinque Martiri di Gerace).

== Notable people involved ==
- Carlo Poerio (1803-1867)
- Ferdinand II of the Two Sicilies (1810-1859)
- Domenico Romeo (1796-1847)
- The Five Martyrs of Gerace: Rocco Verduci (1824-1847), Michele Bello (1822-1847), Pietro Mazzoni (1822-1847), Gaetano Ruffo (1819-1847) and Domenico Salvadori (1822-1847).
