= 1907 Calabria earthquake =

Earthquake in Italy

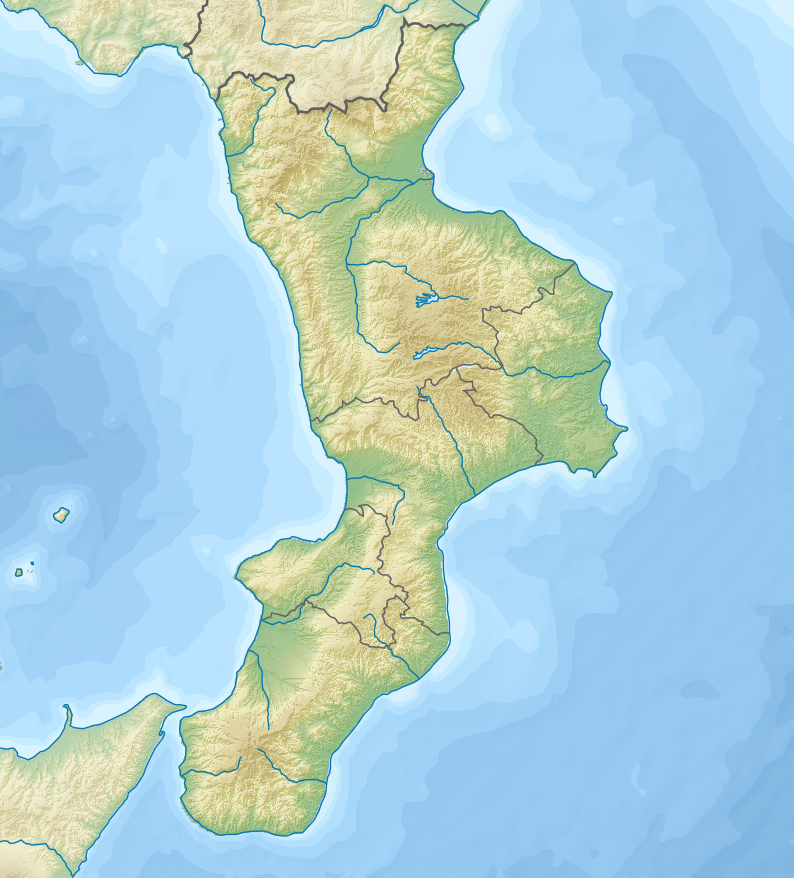
- Location within Calabria
- UTC time: 1907-10-23 20:28:19
- ISC event: n/a
- USGS-ANSS: ComCat
- Local date: 23 October 1907
- Local time: 21:28
- Magnitude: 5.9 M_{s}
- Depth: 33 km (21 mi)
- Epicenter: 38.087°N 15.985°E
- Total damage: Severe
- Max. intensity: MMI IX (Violent)
- Foreshocks: yes
- Casualties: 167 dead

On 23 October 1907 a magnitude 5.9 earthquake struck Calabria, at a depth of 33.0 km. in the area of Gerace-Siderno, on the southeast coast of Calabria. The event caused 167 deaths and major damage.

The epicentral area included only one town (Ferruzzano), where many houses collapsed almost completely, and 158 persons, or 8% of its population, were killed. Ferruzano had been hit as well in the 1905 Calabria earthquake.

Almost a month later, on 17 November 1907, the area of Ferruzzano, Brancaleone and Bianco was hit again. On 23 January 1908 the area was hit again by an earthquake. People had to camp in the fields or in nearby subterranean grottos. In Ferruzzano new houses built after the earthquakes of 1905 and 1907 resisted the shocks of the 1908 Messina earthquake.

== See also ==
- List of earthquakes in 1907
- List of earthquakes in Italy
