= Attempted assassination of Franklin D. Roosevelt =

1933 shooting in Miami, Florida, U.S.

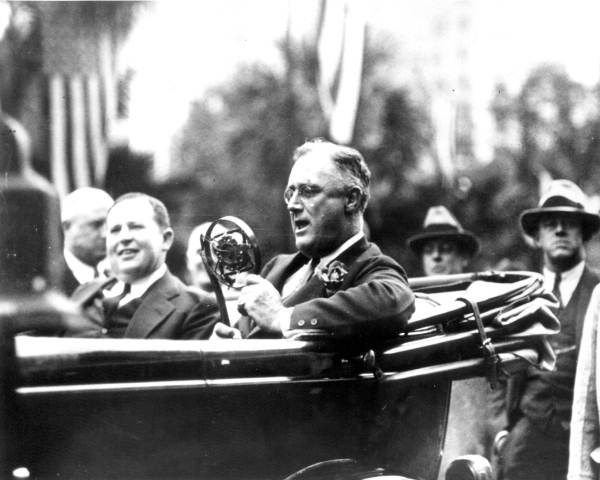
- President-elect Roosevelt with Governor David Sholtz in Jacksonville on the same trip to Florida as his attempted assassination
- Location: Bayfront Park, Miami, Florida, U.S.
- Date: February 15, 1933; 93 years ago
- Target: Franklin D. Roosevelt
- Attack type: Attempted assassination by shooting
- Weapon: .32-caliber Iver Johnson revolver
- Deaths: 1 (Anton Cermak)
- Injuries: 5
- Perpetrator: Giuseppe Zangara
- Motive: Anti-capitalism; Mental illness (alleged)
- Charges: First degree murder Attempted murder (4 counts)
- Verdict: Plead guilty
- Sentence: Death

On February 15, 1933, Franklin D. Roosevelt, then president-elect of the United States, survived an assassination attempt while delivering an impromptu speech at night from the back of an open car in Miami, Florida. The would-be assassin, Italian immigrant Giuseppe Zangara, fired five shots with a handgun, injuring four bystanders and mortally wounding Chicago mayor Anton Cermak, who was standing on the running board of the car next to Roosevelt. Zangara's intended target, Roosevelt, was unharmed in the attack.

After the assassination attempt, Zangara pleaded guilty to murder and was executed in Florida on March 20, 1933. Roosevelt went on to be the longest-serving president in American history, serving until his death in 1945.

== Background ==
In 1929, a dynamite bomb was mailed to the then-governor of New York, Franklin D. Roosevelt. The bomb was intercepted by a mailroom worker who accidentally stepped on the parcel, rendering it inert. It was later revealed that same postal employee had created the bomb, hoping to gain financial support by claiming to have found it and saved the Governor's life. It is unclear if the man had any true interest in assassinating Roosevelt. The man was sent to Bellevue Hospital for observation rather than prison.

Against the backdrop of the Great Depression, New York governor and Democratic presidential nominee Franklin D. Roosevelt promised recovery with a "New Deal" for the American people. Campaigning on the failures of the Hoover administration, Roosevelt won a landslide victory in the 1932 presidential election against incumbent Republican president Herbert Hoover.

The 1932 election was a political realignment: not only did Roosevelt win a sweeping victory over Hoover, but Democrats significantly extended their control over the U.S. House, gaining 101 seats, and also gained 12 seats in the U.S. Senate to gain control of the chamber. The election ended twelve years of Republican leadership and marked the effective end of the Fourth Party System. Until 1932, the Republicans had controlled the presidency for 52 of the previous 72 years, dating back to Abraham Lincoln being elected president in 1860.

Roosevelt's transition was contentious, with tremendous tensions between the President-elect and the outgoing president. Roosevelt was set to become the 32nd president of the United States on March 4, 1933.

== Assassination attempt ==
On February 15, 1933, 17 days before his inauguration, Roosevelt was giving an impromptu speech at night from the back of an open car in the Bayfront Park area of Miami, Florida, where Zangara was working the occasional odd job and living off his savings. Zangara, armed with a .32-caliber revolver from the US Revolver Company that he had bought for $8 (equivalent to $200 in 2025) at a local pawn shop, joined the crowd of spectators, but as he was only 5 feet (1.5 m) tall, he was unable to see over other people and had to stand on a wobbly bench, where Mrs. Lillian Cross was already standing for a better view. Zangara got on the bench to get a clear aim at his target from 25 feet (7.6 m) away. He placed his gun near Mrs. Cross's right shoulder (she was only about 4 inches taller than he and weighed 105 pounds).

Lillian Cross saw Zangara's pistol, quickly transferred her purse from right to left hand, and then pushed up and twisted Zangara's shooting arm. As he fired shots, Mrs. Cross reported that Zangara continually attempted to force her arm back down but she "wouldn't let go." Five people were hit: Mrs. Joseph H. Gill (seriously wounded in the abdomen); Miss Margaret Kruis of Newark, New Jersey, (minor wound in hand and a scalp wound); New York detective/bodyguard William Sinnott (superficial head wound); Russell Caldwell of Miami (flesh wound on the forehead); and Chicago mayor Anton Cermak, who was standing on the running board of the car next to Roosevelt. Mrs. Cross had powder burns on her right cheek. A Secret Service agent, Bob Clark, had a grazed hand, possibly caused by the bullet that struck Cermak. The intended target, Roosevelt, was unharmed.

Roosevelt cradled the mortally wounded Cermak in his arms as the car rushed to the hospital; after arriving there, Cermak spoke to Roosevelt and, before he died 19 days later, allegedly uttered the line that is engraved on his tomb: "I'm glad it was me, not you." The Chicago Tribune reported the quote without attributing it to a witness, and most scholars doubt it was ever said.

== Perpetrator ==
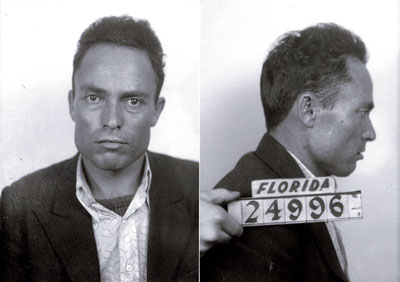
Mug shot of Giuseppe Zangara, 1933

The attempt on Roosevelt's life was perpetrated by Giuseppe Zangara, an Italian immigrant and Royal Italian Army veteran. He was born on September 7, 1900, in Ferruzzano, Kingdom of Italy, and immigrated to the United States in 1923. Zangara lived in Paterson, New Jersey, and became a naturalized citizen of the United States in 1929. He had little formal education and worked as a bricklayer.

Arguments have been made that Zangara was mentally ill, incapable of distinguishing right from wrong, and ought to have had an insanity defense presented on his behalf while others have contended that he was sane.

== Aftermath ==
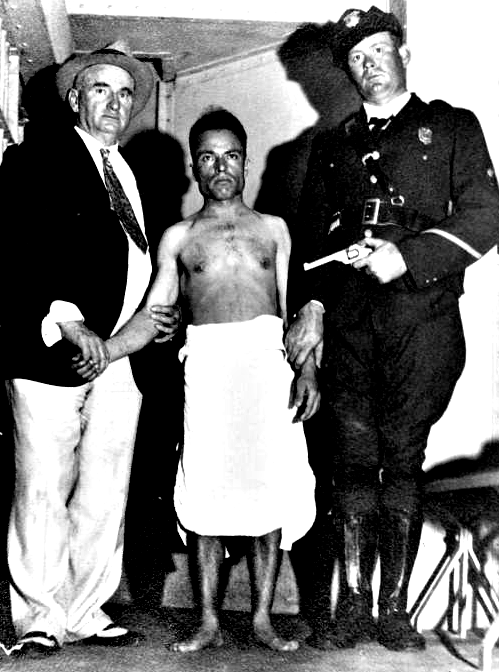
Zangara after his arrest in custody of Dade County Sheriff Dan Hardie (left) and Miami Police Officer Lestron G. "Red" Crews (right) holding the pistol used by Zangara

Zangara confessed in the Dade County Courthouse jail, stating: "I have the gun in my hand. I kill kings and presidents first and next all capitalists." He pleaded guilty to four counts of attempted murder and was sentenced to 80 years in prison. As he was led out of the courtroom, Zangara told the judge: "Four times 20 is 80. Oh, judge, don't be stingy. Give me a hundred years."

Cermak died of peritonitis 19 days later, on March 6, 1933, two days after Roosevelt's inauguration. Zangara was promptly indicted for first-degree murder in Cermak's death. Because Zangara had intended to commit murder, the fact that his intended target may not have been the man he ultimately killed was not relevant as he would still be guilty of first-degree murder under the doctrine of transferred intent. There were worries that Zangara's defense would argue that Cermak's death was not a result of his bullet injury. A theory, raised decades later, questioned whether Cermak's death was caused by medical malpractice on the part of the doctors treating him. It alleged that they failed to realize that the bullet had actually caused direct damage to his colon and precipitated the perforation. The perforation led to sepsis and his death but Cermak might not have died "but for [the] physicians' blunders". This theory was refuted by a later medical analysis of the event.

Zangara pleaded guilty to the additional murder charge and was sentenced to death by Circuit Court Judge Uly Thompson. Zangara said after hearing his sentence: "You give me electric chair. I no afraid of that chair! You one of capitalists. You is crook man too. Put me in electric chair. I no care!" Under Florida law, a convicted murderer could not share cell space with another prisoner before his execution, but another convicted murderer was already awaiting execution at Raiford. Zangara's sentence required prison officials to expand their waiting area for prisoners sentenced to death and the "death cell" became "Death Row".

After spending only 10 days on death row, Zangara was executed on March 20, 1933, in Old Sparky, the electric chair at Florida State Prison in Raiford. Zangara became enraged when he learned no newsreel cameras would be filming his final moments. His final statement was "Viva l'Italia! Goodbye to all poor peoples everywhere! ... Push the button! Go ahead, push the button!"

== In popular culture ==
- The Man in the High Castle -- Philip K. Dick's alternative history novel and Amazon Prime Video's television series. The premise of the plot begins with the successful assassination of President-elect Roosevelt in 1933, resulting in the continuation of the Great Depression and the policy of United States non-interventionism at the start of World War II in 1939. American inaction allows Nazi Germany to conquer and annex continental Europe and the Soviet Union into the Reich. The exterminations of the Jews, the Romani, the Jehovah's Witnesses, the Slavs, and all other peoples whom the Nazis considered subhuman ensued. The Axis powers then jointly conquered Africa, and still compete for the control of South America in 1962. Imperial Japan won the war in the Pacific and invaded the West Coast of the United States, while Nazi Germany invaded the East Coast; the surrender of the Allies ended World War II in 1947.

== See also ==
- List of United States presidential assassination attempts and plots

== Sources ==
- Bardhan-Quallen, Sudipta (2007). Franklin Delano Roosevelt: A National Hero. New York: Sterling Pub. Co. ISBN 978-1-4027-4747-2.
- Boertlein, John (2010). "A Little Luck for the President-Elect". Presidential Confidential: Sex, Scandal, Murder and Mayhem in the Oval Office. Clerisy Press. pp. 48–49. ISBN 978-1-57860-361-9.
- Davis, Kenneth S. (1994). FDR: The New York Years: 1928–1933.
- Freidel, Frank (1956). Franklin D. Roosevelt: The Triumph.
- Hernandez, Ernio (March 24, 2004). "Assassins Shooting Gallery: Kuhn as Zangara and Cerveris as Booth". Playbill. Archived from the original on January 17, 2011.
- McCann, Joseph T. (2006). "The Case of Giuseppe Zangara". Terrorism on American Soil: A Concise History of Plots and Perpetrators from the Famous to the Forgotten. Boulder: Sentient Publications. ISBN 978-1-59181-049-0.
- Picchi, Blaise (1998). The Five Weeks of Giuseppe Zangara : The Man Who Would Assassinate FDR. Chicago: Academy Chicago Publishers. ISBN 9780897334433. OCLC 38468505.
- Shappee, Nathan D. (1958). "Zangara's Attempted Assassination of Franklin D. Roosevelt". Florida Historical Quarterly. 37 (2): 101–110. ISSN 0015-4113. JSTOR 30145621.
- Yanez, Luisa (September 20, 2007). "Miami to be retold". The Miami Herald. ISSN 0898-865X.
- Muskogee Daily Phoenix (1929) https://www.newspapers.com/image/901037462/?match=1
- New York Times (1929) https://www.nytimes.com/1929/04/11/archives/roosevelt-bomb-made-by-its-finder-postal-porter-confesses-he.html
