= Caraffa del Bianco =

- Comune
- Comune di Caraffa del Bianco
- Coat of arms

- Location within Italy Location within Calabria
- Coordinates: 38°6′N 16°5′E
- Country: Italy
- Region: Calabria
- Metropolitan city: Reggio Calabria (RC)

Area
  - Total: 12.3 km^{2} (4.7 sq mi)

Population (Dec. 2004)
  - Total: 605
  - Density: 49.2/km^{2} (127/sq mi)
- Time zone: UTC+1 (CET)
  - Summer (DST): UTC+2 (CEST)
- Postal code: 89030
- Dialing code: 0964
- Website: Official website

Caraffa del Bianco is a comune (municipality) in the Province of Reggio Calabria in the Italian region Calabria, located about 100 kilometres (62 mi) southwest of Catanzaro and about 35 kilometres (22 mi) east of Reggio Calabria. As of 31 December 2004, it had a population of 605 and an area of 12.3 square kilometres (4.7 mi^{2}).

Caraffa del Bianco borders the following municipalities: Bianco, Casignana, Ferruzzano, Sant'Agata del Bianco.

The revolutionary Rocco Verduci (1824-1847) was born at Caraffa del Bianco.

== Demographic evolution ==
Historical population

Year	Pop.	±%
1861	962	—
1871	935	−2.8%
1881	1,106	+18.3%
1901	1,533	+38.6%
1911	1,745	+13.8%

Year	Pop.	±%
1921	1,690	−3.2%
1931	1,582	−6.4%
1936	1,761	+11.3%
1951	1,784	+1.3%
1961	1,347	−24.5%

Year	Pop.	±%
1971	1,026	−23.8%
1981	940	−8.4%
1991	808	−14.0%
2001	622	−23.0%

Source: Data from ISTAT
