= Casignana =

- Comune
- Location within Italy Location within Calabria
- Coordinates: 38°6′N 16°5′E
- Country: Italy
- Region: Calabria
- Metropolitan city: Reggio Calabria
- Frazioni: Bianco, Bovalino, Caraffa del Bianco, San Luca, Sant'Agata del Bianco

Area
  - Total: 24.54 km^{2} (9.47 sq mi)

Population (2018-01-01)
  - Total: 742
  - Density: 30.2/km^{2} (78.3/sq mi)
- Time zone: UTC+1 (CET)
  - Summer (DST): UTC+2 (CEST)

Casignana is a comune (municipality) in the Province of Reggio Calabria in region of Calabria, Italy and located about 35 km (22 mi) east of Reggio Calabria.

It is best known for the monumental ancient Roman villa at Palazzi di Casignana which can be visited.

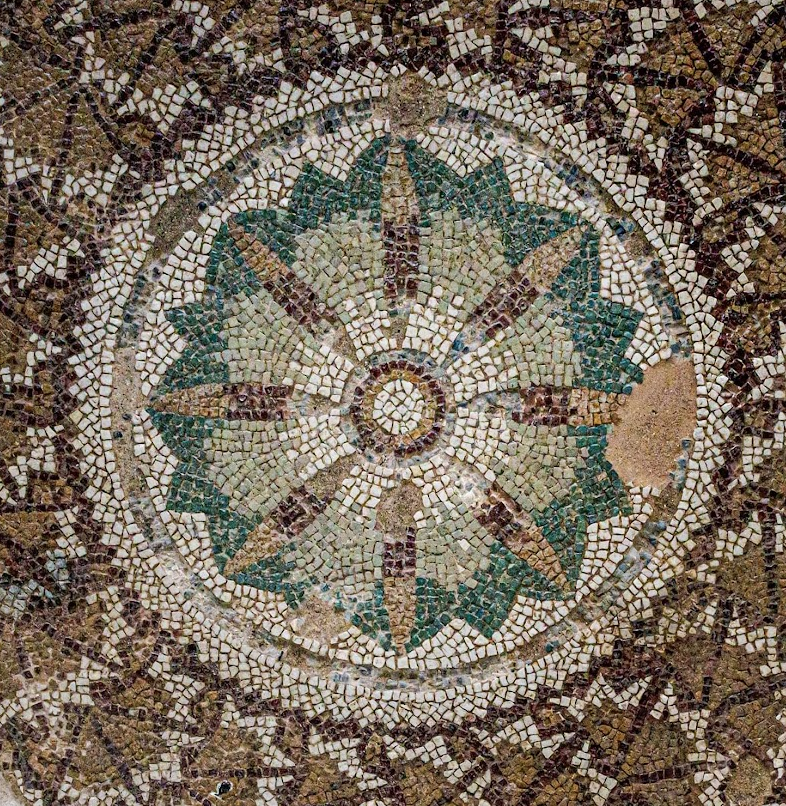
mosaic from Roman Villa at Casignana

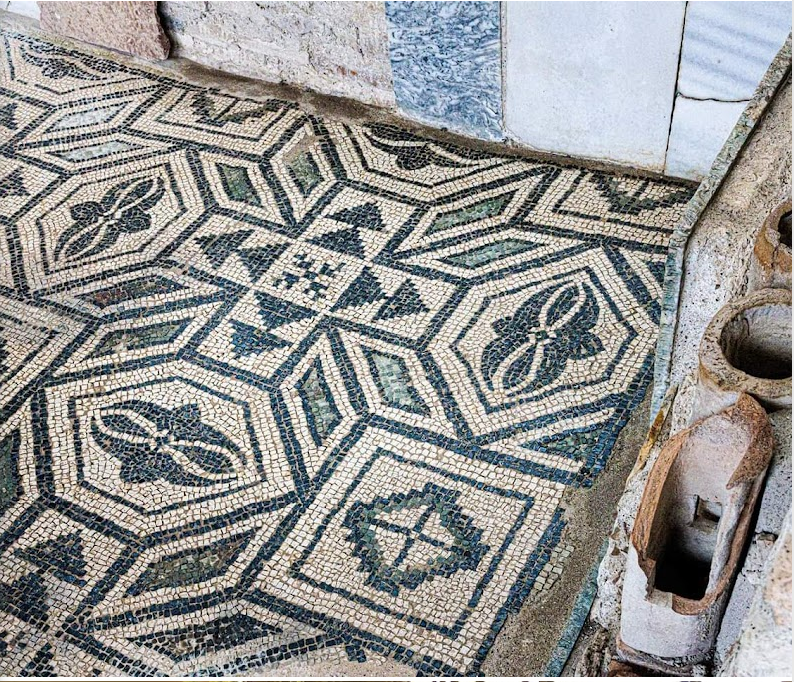
Villa Palazzi di Casignana

== Roman Villa at Palazzi di Casignana ==
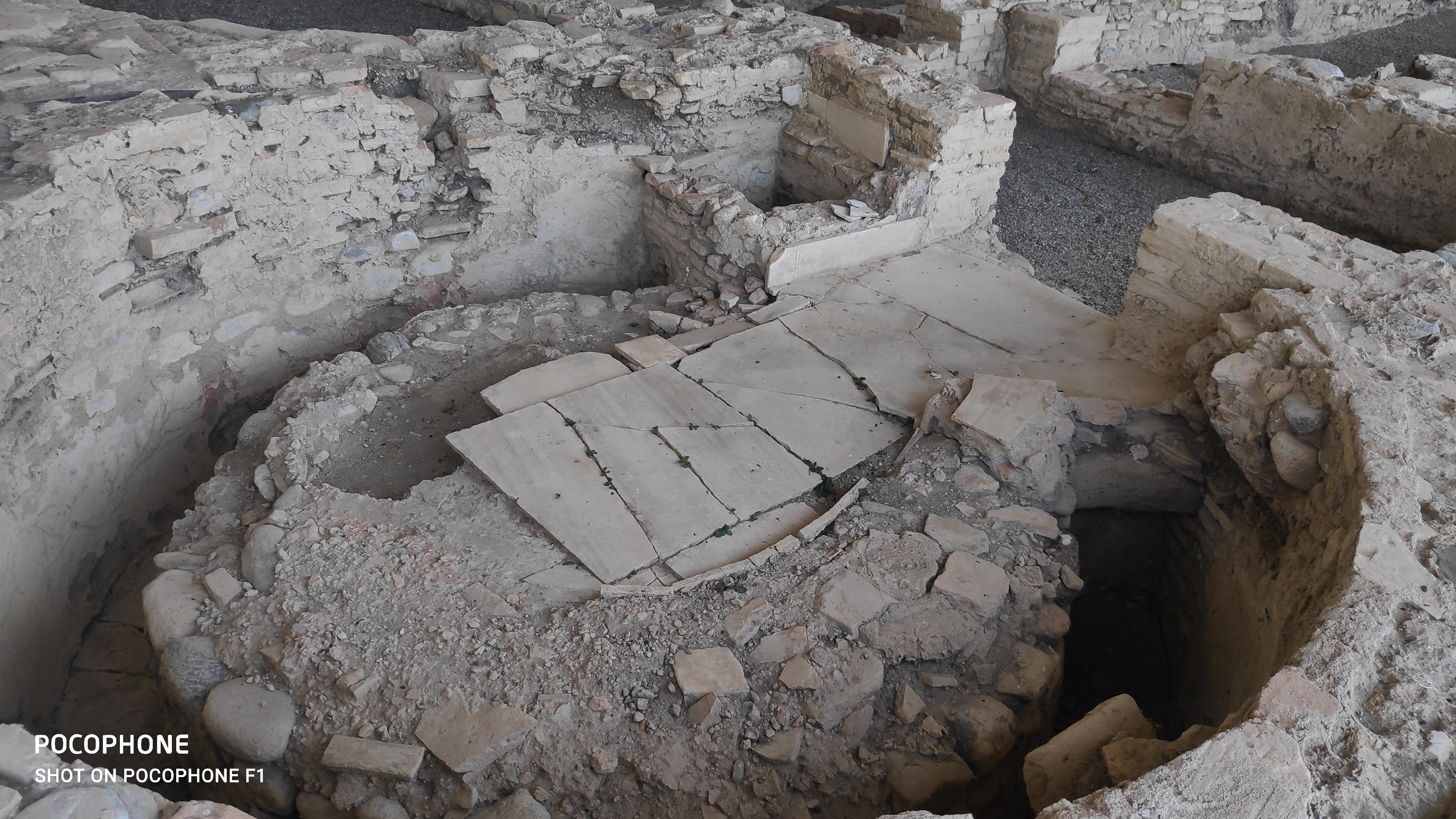
Latrine

It was an extensive luxurious villa maritima located on the seashore and probably on the ancient road linking Locri and Rhegion (Reggio Calabria).

The residential part of the villa has rooms arranged around a large peristyle courtyard. The "room of the four seasons" and apsidal room have mosaic floors.

On the opposite side of the modern road is a richly decorated large private bath complex. Mosaic floors include the frigidarium ("room of the Nereids") dated to the 3rd century which depicts a marine thiasos in large white and green tiles with four female figures riding a lion, a bull, a horse and a tiger terminating in a fish tail. The room has an octagonal plan with four apsidal sides and has two basins for cold water. The calidarium with a hypocaust heating system and clay pipes on the walls, also has an octagonal plan and mosaic flooring in small tiles and must have been covered by a vault. The complex also includes a rectangular hall paved with coloured marble slabs (opus sectile).

There is a monumental nymphaeum with cisterns.

The Roman statio of Altanum was also located at the villa.

== Festivals ==
- On 16 August the festival of San Rocco is held. Many rides, food and fun activities surround the town on this special day. It is celebrated by carrying the statue of San Rocco around the town as a symbol of his travels then entering the statue in the church symbolises his canonisation as a saint.
- Easter day is celebrated by reenacting the frunttata (resurrection of Jesus Christ) with holy icons and statues followed by mass and the sacrifice of a lamb to represent the death Of Christ.
- After Easter day it is paquarella; on this day it is time to go into the country and harvest the wheat and crops of that summer. It also is a time to picnic in Aspromonte National Park to eat all the leftovers of the Easter celebration.

== Demographic evolution ==
Historical population

Year	Pop.	±%
1861	1,046	—
1871	1,163	+11.2%
1881	1,215	+4.5%
1901	1,440	+18.5%
1911	1,581	+9.8%

Year	Pop.	±%
1921	1,639	+3.7%
1931	1,883	+14.9%
1936	1,746	−7.3%
1951	2,059	+17.9%
1961	1,641	−20.3%

Year	Pop.	±%
1971	1,204	−26.6%
1981	962	−20.1%
1991	836	−13.1%
2001	775	−7.3%

Source: Data from ISTAT
