= Ferruzzano =

- Comune
- Comune di Ferruzzano
- Location within Italy Location within Calabria
- Coordinates: 38°2′20″N 16°5′15″E
- Country: Italy
- Region: Calabria
- Metropolitan city: Reggio Calabria (RC)

Government
  - Mayor: Domenico Silvio Pizzi (Civic list)

Area
  - Total: 19.1 km^{2} (7.4 sq mi)

Population (Dec. 2004)
  - Total: 863
  - Density: 45.2/km^{2} (117/sq mi)
- Demonym: Ferruzzanoti
- Time zone: UTC+1 (CET)
  - Summer (DST): UTC+2 (CEST)
- Postal code: 89030
- Dialing code: 0964
- Saint day: First sunday of August (San Giuseppe)

Ferruzzano is a comune (municipality) in the Province of Reggio Calabria in the Italian region of Calabria, located about 110 kilometres (68 mi) southwest of Catanzaro and about 40 kilometres (25 mi) east of Reggio Calabria. As of 31 December 2004, it had a population of 863 and an area of 19.1 square kilometres (7.4 mi^{2}).

Ferruzzano borders the following municipalities: Bianco, Bruzzano Zeffirio, Caraffa del Bianco, Sant'Agata del Bianco. It is the home town of Giuseppe Zangara, the man who tried to assassinate Franklin Delano Roosevelt.

On 23 October 1907 a magnitude 5.9 earthquake struck Calabria, at a depth of 33.0 km. The epicentral area included Ferruzzano, where many houses collapsed almost completely, and 158 persons, or 8% of its population, were killed. Ferruzano had been hit as well in the 1905 Calabria earthquake. Several aftershocks followed: on 17 November 1907 Ferruzzano was hit by an earthquake again, as well as on 23 January 1908. New houses built after the earthquakes of 1905 and 1907 resisted the shocks of the 1908 Messina earthquake.

== Demographic evolution ==
Historical population

Year	Pop.	±%
1861	1,109	—
1871	1,272	+14.7%
1881	1,557	+22.4%
1901	2,004	+28.7%
1911	1,839	−8.2%

Year	Pop.	±%
1921	1,769	−3.8%
1931	1,935	+9.4%
1936	2,016	+4.2%
1951	2,068	+2.6%
1961	1,556	−24.8%

Year	Pop.	±%
1971	1,154	−25.8%
1981	954	−17.3%
1991	916	−4.0%
2001	852	−7.0%

Source: Data from ISTAT

== Economy ==
Ferruzzano's economy mainly relies on agriculture, mostly sheep and cattle farming and fruit cultivation, there also several small businesses and a pharmacy in the village and the local government is the main employer. Other than that, tourism is poorly exploited, with most tourists being Italian Canadians and Italian Americans visiting the village as part of roots tourism.
