= Giuseppe Zangara =

Attempted assassin of Franklin D. Roosevelt (1900–1933)

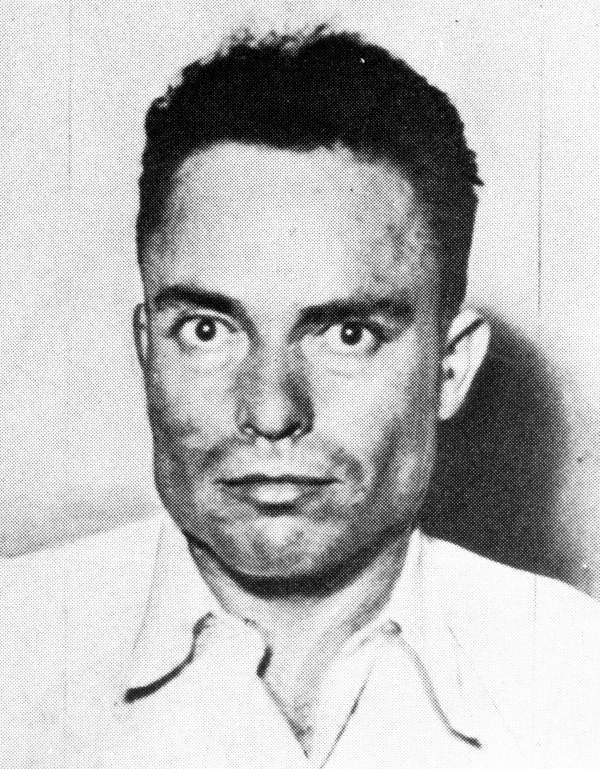
- Zangara in 1933
- Born: September 7, 1900; Ferruzzano, Calabria, Kingdom of Italy
- Died: March 20, 1933 (aged 32); Florida State Prison, Raiford, Florida, U.S.
- Status: Executed by electrocution
- Convictions: First degree murder Attempted murder (4 counts)
- Penalty: Death

Details
- Date: February 15, 1933
- Locations: Miami, Florida, U.S.
- Killed: 1 (Anton Cermak)
- Injured: 4
- Weapon: .32-caliber revolver

Giuseppe Zangara (September 7, 1900 – March 20, 1933) was an Italian-born American man who attempted to assassinate the President-elect of the United States, Franklin D. Roosevelt, on February 15, 1933, 17 days before Roosevelt's inauguration. During a night speech by Roosevelt in Miami, Florida, Zangara fired five shots with a handgun he had purchased a few days before. He missed his target and instead killed Anton Cermak, the mayor of Chicago, and injured four bystanders.

Zangara, who pled guilty and refused to appeal, was executed in Florida's electric chair slightly over a month later.

== Early life ==
Zangara was born on September 7, 1900, in Ferruzzano, Calabria, Italy, to farmers Salvatore and Rosina Zangara. When Zangara was two years old, his mother died, with his father soon remarrying a widow with six daughters. At age six, he was forced to drop out of school by his father to support the family with menial jobs. Throughout his childhood, Zangara was frequently beaten, sometimes to the point of unconsciousness, by his father. At age sixteen or seventeen, Zangara enlisted in the Royal Italian Army for five years.

Except for his entry and discharge dates, no records remained of Zangara's military service. He reportedly served in the Tyrolean Alps during World War I. Zangara later claimed that in 1923, he had made plans to assassinate King of Italy Victor Emmanuel III during a visit to Naples, buying a service revolver for this purpose, but that he relented after receiving a letter by his uncle Vincent Cafaro, who offered to let him move to his home in the United States.

On August 23, 1923, Zangara, accompanied by Cafaro, immigrated to the United States via the USS Martha Washington, arriving in New Jersey on September 2, 1923. For five years, he lived at Cafaro's residence in Hackensack, New Jersey, and later Paterson, before moving out following his uncle's marriage. Between 1928 and 1929, he frequently rented rooms in Hackensack, Paterson, East Paterson and Passaic, also spending a brief period residing in New Orleans, Louisiana. On September 3, 1929, Zangara became a naturalized US citizen after his citizenship application, filed the day of his arrival, was approved.

During the Great Depression, Zangara moved around the continent as a migrant worker, unsuccessfully seeking employment in California, Florida, and Panama. He blamed the incumbent President Herbert Hoover for the poor job market. Zangara maintained his hatred of the US administration for its economic failings after Franklin D. Roosvelt was elected in the 1932 United States presidential election. By February 1933, Zangara was living homeless in Miami.

== Health issues ==
Zangara had little education and worked as a bricklayer. He suffered severe pain in his abdomen, which doctors told him was chronic and incurable. In 1926 he underwent an appendectomy, but it was no help; if anything, it may have made his pain worse. The doctors who performed his autopsy attributed his abdominal pain to adhesions they found on his gallbladder. In his prison memoir, Zangara attributed his pain to being forced to do grueling physical labor on his father's farm from an early age. He wrote that his pain began when he was six years old.

Observers at the time and following his execution have discussed his mental state. Arguments have been made that Zangara was mentally ill, incapable of distinguishing right from wrong, and ought to have had an insanity defense presented on his behalf, while others have contended that he was sane.

== Assassination attempt ==
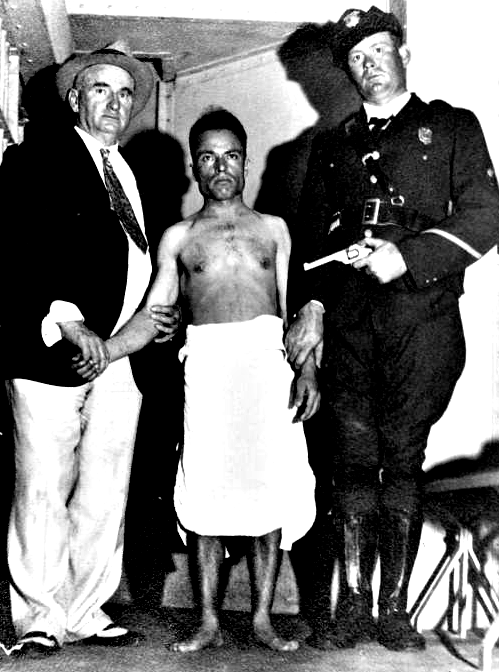
Zangara after his arrest in custody of Dade County Sheriff Dan Hardie (left) and Miami Police Officer Lestron G. "Red" Crews (right) holding the pistol used by Zangara

On February 15, 1933, Roosevelt was giving an impromptu speech at night from the back of an open car in the Bayfront Park area of Miami, Florida, where Zangara was working the occasional odd job and living off his savings. Zangara, armed with a .32-caliber US Revolver Company revolver he had bought for $8, equivalent to $200 in 2025, at a local pawn shop, joined the crowd of spectators. As he was only 5 feet (1.5 m) tall, he was unable to see over other people and had to stand on a wobbly bench, where Lillian Cross was already standing for a better view. Zangara got on the bench to get a clear aim at his target from 25 feet away.

Lillian Cross saw Zangara's pistol, quickly transferred her purse from right to left hand, and then pushed up and twisted Zangara's shooting arm. As he fired shots, Cross reported that Zangara continually attempted to force her arm back down but she "wouldn't let go." Five people were hit: Mabel Gill (seriously wounded in the abdomen); Margaret Kruis of Newark, New Jersey, (minor wound in the hand and a scalp wound); New York detective/bodyguard William Sinnott (superficial head wound); Russell Caldwell of Miami (flesh wound on the forehead); and Chicago mayor Anton Cermak, who was standing on the running board of the car next to Roosevelt.

Cross had powder burns on her right cheek. A Secret Service agent, Bob Clark, had a grazed hand, possibly caused by the bullet that struck Cermak. The intended target, Roosevelt, was unharmed.

Roosevelt cradled the mortally wounded Cermak in his arms as the car rushed to the hospital. After arriving there, Cermak spoke to Roosevelt and, before he died 19 days later, allegedly uttered the line that is engraved on his tomb: "I'm glad it was me, not you." The Tribune reported the quote without attributing it to a witness, and most scholars doubt it was ever said.

== Aftermath ==
Zangara confessed in the Dade County Courthouse jail, stating: "I have the gun in my hand. I kill kings and presidents first and next all capitalists." Although commonly described as an anarchist, police did not believe that Zangara, a registered Republican, held any particular political beliefs, as he told them that he was "in favor of assassinating all presidents, kings, and prime ministers", voicing a desire to kill Benito Mussolini and Edward VIII. Psychiatrist Sandor Lorand, who examined Zangara, stated that his anti-authoritarian beliefs were not rooted in anarchist ideology, but rather Zangara's hatred for his father.

He pleaded guilty to four counts of attempted murder and was sentenced to 80 years in prison. As he was led out of the courtroom, Zangara told the judge, "don't be stingy. Give me a hundred years."

Cermak died of peritonitis 19 days later, on March 6, 1933, two days after Roosevelt's inauguration. Zangara was promptly indicted for first-degree murder in Cermak's death. Because Zangara had intended to commit murder, the fact that his intended target may not have been the man he ultimately killed was not relevant, as he would still be guilty of first-degree murder under the doctrine of transferred intent. There were worries that Zangara's defense would argue that Cermak's death was not a result of his bullet injury.

A theory, raised decades later, questioned whether Cermak's death was caused by medical malpractice on the part of the doctors treating him. It alleged that they failed to realize that the bullet had actually caused direct damage to his colon and precipitated the perforation. The perforation led to sepsis and his death, but Cermak might not have died "but for [the] physicians' blunders". This theory was refuted by a later medical analysis of the event.

Zangara pleaded guilty to the additional murder charge and was sentenced to death by Circuit Court Judge Uly Thompson. Zangara said after hearing his sentence: "You give me electric chair. I no afraid of that chair! You one of capitalists. You is crook man too. Put me in electric chair. I no care!". Under Florida law, a convicted murderer could not share cell space with another prisoner before his execution, but another convicted murderer was already awaiting execution at Raiford. Zangara's sentence required prison officials to expand their waiting area for prisoners sentenced to death, and the "death cell" became "Death Row".

== Execution ==
After spending only 10 days on death row, Zangara was executed on March 20, 1933, in Old Sparky, the electric chair at Florida State Prison in Raiford. Zangara became enraged when he learned no newsreel cameras would be filming his final moments. His final statement was "Viva l'Italia! Goodbye to all poor peoples everywhere! ... Push the button! Go ahead, push the button!".

== Conspiracy theory ==
While accounts focus on Cermak and the other victims being random casualties of an attempt to assassinate Roosevelt, a conspiracy theory emerged, asserting that Zangara was a hired killer working for Frank Nitti, who was the head of the Chicago Outfit crime syndicate.

In 2002, John William Tuohy, author of numerous books on organized crime in Chicago, after reviewing Secret Service records, described in detail in article his interpretation of how and why Cermak was the real target, and the relationship of the shooting to the rampant gang violence in Chicago. The theory is enhanced by numerous researchers, citing their analysis of court testimony, asserting that Cermak had directed an assassination attempt on Nitti less than three months earlier.

The conspiracy theorists suggest that Zangara had been an expert marksman in the Italian Army 16 years earlier, who would presumably hit his target, though they sidestep any issues about Zangara's health since his time in the war, his short stature requiring him to stand on a jostled chair, his experience being with a rifle rather than with a pistol from a great distance, and his own statements regarding his target.

Raymond Moley, who interviewed Zangara, believed he was not part of any larger conspiracy, and that he had intended to kill Roosevelt.

== In popular culture ==
In a 1960 two-part story line titled "The Unhired Assassin" on the TV series The Untouchables, actor Joe Mantell played the part of Giuseppe "Joe" Zangara. This episode, while depicting Zangara's story throughout, focuses mostly on Nitti's plan to kill Cermak with an initial (fictionalized) attempt in Chicago that is foiled by Eliot Ness and his agents at the end of part one. In part two, another attempt is made using a contract hitman, an ex-Army rifleman in Florida, which again fails thanks to Ness. Suddenly, Zangara's failed, and unrelated, obsession with killing Roosevelt unintentionally achieves Nitti's goal. This two-part story was later edited together as a feature-length movie retitled The Gun of Zangara. In the 1993 reboot of The Untouchables, the episode "Radical Solution" has actor David Engel portraying Zangara.

Zangara plays a significant role in the background provided for Philip K. Dick's 1962 novel The Man in the High Castle (as well as the subsequent Amazon original series). This alternate history novel, set after an Axis victory in World War II, bases the point of divergence on the premise that Zangara succeeded in assassinating President-elect Roosevelt on February 15, 1933, in Miami. Eric Norden's 1973 alternate history novel The Ultimate Solution also uses this point of divergence. A similar Zangara-is-successful premise is used in the GURPS Alternate Earths role-playing game's "Reich 5" alternate universe.

Max Allan Collins' 1983 novel True Detective, first in his Nathan Heller mystery series, features Zangara's attempted assassination of Roosevelt, positing it as an actual attempt on Chicago mayor Anton Cermak. The novel won the 1984 Shamus Award for Best P.I. Hardcover from the Private Eye Writers of America.

In the original 1990 Off-Broadway production of Assassins by Stephen Sondheim, Zangara was played by Eddie Korbich. In later productions, he was played by Paul Harrhy in London's West End (1992 premiere) and Jeffrey Kuhn on Broadway (2004 premiere). Appearing in several songs from the musical, the Zangara character has a major solo in the number "How I Saved Roosevelt".

In HBO's 1998 biopic Winchell, moments after the assassination attempt, Walter Winchell leaps onto the running board of Miami's Police Chief's car, asking for an interview with Zangara, thereby getting at exclusive story for the New York Daily Mirror.

The 2011 fantasy noir novel Spellbound by Larry Correia features Zangara's attempted assassination of Roosevelt. Zangara is magically enhanced in a plot to inflame bigotry and curtail the civil rights of the magically gifted protagonists of the Grimnoir Society. Instead of using a small-caliber handgun, Zangara is made into a living cannon or bomb and kills nearly 200 onlookers, including Cermak, and cripples Roosevelt.

Charlaine Harris' fantasy Western Gunnie Rose Series is set in a world in which Zangara succeeded in assassinating Roosevelt, and the United States fractured into several different successor states.

== See also ==
- Capital punishment in Florida
- List of people executed in Florida (pre-1972)
- List of people executed in the United States in 1933
