= Iver Johnson =

Weapons and vehicle manufacturer (1871–1993)

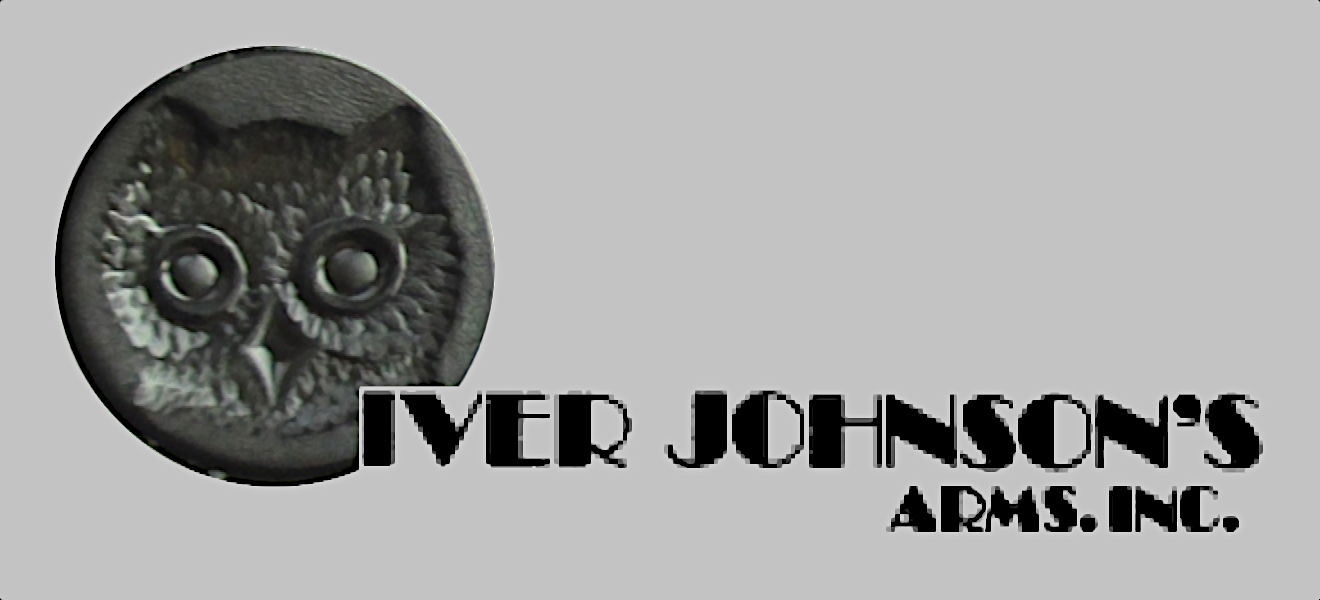
- Type: Private
- Industry: Manufacturing
- Predecessor: Johnson Bye & Company
- Founded: 1871; 155 years ago
- Founder: Iver Johnson and Martin Bye
- Defunct: 1993; 33 years ago
- Fate: Dissolved
- Headquarters: Jacksonville, Arkansas, U.S.
- Products: firearms, bicycles, and motorcycles
- Parent: American Military Arms Corp

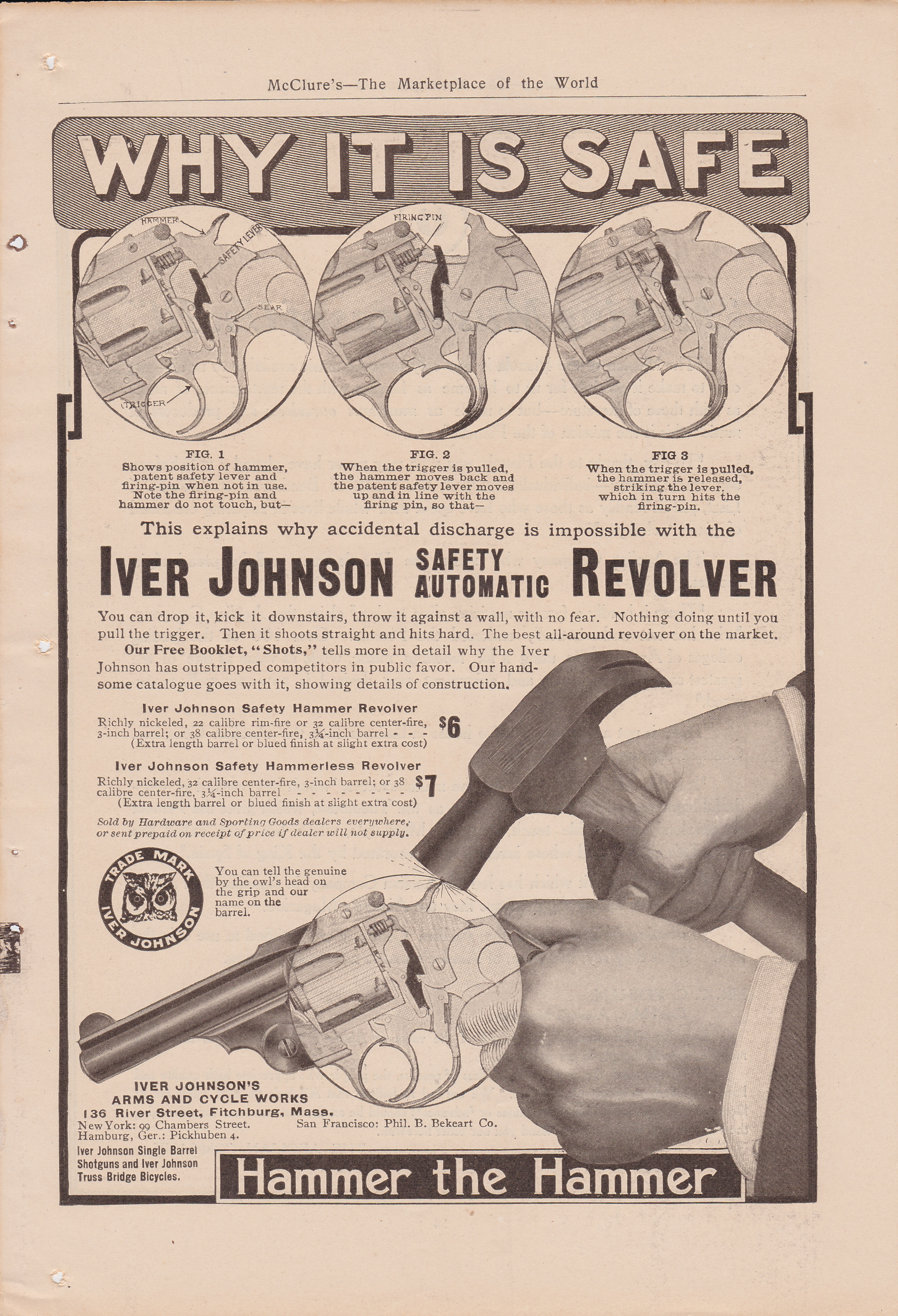
Advertisement from Iver Johnson touting its drop safe innovation.

Iver Johnson was an American firearms manufacturer from 1871 to 1993. Named after its founder, Norwegian-born Iver Johnson (1841–1895), the company also produced bicycles and motorcycles in its early days.

The name was acquired by Squires Bingham International, which renamed itself Iver Johnson Arms in 2006. As it does not manufacture parts or provide information relating to the pre-1993 company, it represents a continuation of it in name only.

== Iver Johnson ==
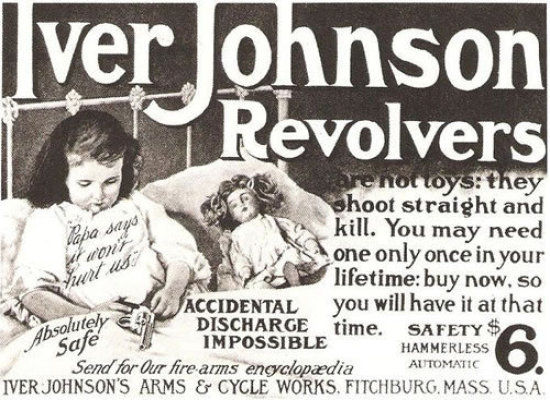
Iver Johnson revolver advertisement, pre-1907

Iver Johnson was born in 1841 in Nordfjord, Sogn og Fjordane county, Norway. He was educated as a gunsmith in Bergen in 1857, and had a gun store in Oslo. Johnson emigrated from Norway to Worcester, Massachusetts, United States in 1863, and continued his work as a gunsmith by trade and an inventor in his spare time. Seeking new and creative uses for his partially idle manufacturing equipment after the American Civil War, he worked not only gunsmithing locally in Fitchburg, but also providing designs and work to other firearms companies; notably making pepper-box pistols for Allen & Wheelock.

On April 9, 1868, Johnson married Mary Elizabeth (née Speirs, born January 1847) in Worcester; and the couple had three sons and two daughters.

== Johnson Bye & Company ==
In 1871, Johnson and Martin Bye merged their gunsmithing operations to form the Johnson Bye & Company. Beginning in 1876, Johnson and Bye filed jointly for and received multiple patents for new and improved firearms features. Their primary revenues, however, came from the sale of company designed and manufactured inexpensive revolvers.

Johnson purchased Bye's interest in 1883, and renamed the firm Iver Johnson & Company .

== Iver Johnson's Arms & Cycle Works ==
The company's name changed again to Iver Johnson's Arms & Cycle Works in 1891, when the company relocated to Fitchburg, Massachusetts, (sometimes incorrectly referred to as "Fitzburg") in order to have better and larger manufacturing facilities. The company attracted a number of talented immigrant machinists and designers to its ranks, including O.F. Mossberg and Andrew Fyrberg, who would go on to invent the company's top-latching strap mechanism and the Hammer-the-Hammer transfer bar safety system used on the company's popular line of top-break safety revolvers.

Iver Johnson died of tuberculosis in 1895, and his sons took over the business. Frederick Iver, (born 10/2/1871), John Lovell (born 6/26/1876), and Walter Olof (born August 1878), each had vastly different levels of involvement in the company ranging from executive leadership to barely any involvement at all. They shepherded the company through a phase of expansion, as bicycle operations grew, then converted to motorcycle manufacturing and sales. They also saw the growth of the firearms business and the eventual restructuring of the company to focus on firearms and related business as they divested non-firearms concerns, such as the motorcycle business, in the face of growing firearms demand, World War I's armaments industry expansion, and other factors. As family ownership waned and outside investment via publicly traded stock and mergers/acquisitions/partnerships took hold, the company changed ownership and moved several times during its operation.

The company eventually dropped "Cycle Works" from its name when that part of the business was shut down. The business successfully weathered the Great Depression (in part thanks to higher rates of armed robbery, which helped maintain demand for personal firearms) and was buoyed by the dramatic increase in the market for arms leading up to and during World War II.

After World War II, the company's introduction of new firearms slowed to a trickle. Increasingly, company fortunes depended upon sales of its increasingly outmoded revolvers and single-barrel shotguns. Without new research and development, most firearms changes were limited to cosmetic updates of existing designs.

As a result of changes in ownership, the company had the first of two major relocations in 1971 when it moved to New Jersey. It moved again to Jacksonville, Arkansas, and was jointly owned by Lynn Lloyd and Lou Imperato, who also owned the Henry brand name, before it finally ceased trading under its own name in 1993, at which time it was owned by American Military Arms Corporation (AMAC).

== Iver Johnson firearm models ==
Third Model Safety Hammerless .38 S&W

Iver Johnson nomenclature refers to its top-break revolvers as Safety Automatics. The term "Safety Automatic" refers to Iver Johnson's Hammer-the-Hammer transfer bar safety system ("safety") and the automatic ejection of cartridges upon breaking open the revolvers ("automatic"). The firm marketed its firearms as being both for personal safety and home protection, and was dubbed 'armourer to the nation's bedrooms'. It sold perhaps four to six million of its handguns, at a cost of around $6 per unit in 1905 (equivalent to $161 in 2025).

=== Lovell Swift Hammer & Hammerless ===
The Lovell Swift Hammer & Hammerless was a double action 5-shot .38 caliber top-break revolver made from by Iver Johnson 1890 to 1894 and distributed by John P. Lovell Arms Company of Boston, Massachusetts. It had a nickel finish and was the first Iver Johnson to use the owl's head logo on the grips. In appearance, the Swift model resembles the Safety Automatic Revolver that was introduced in 1894. Some differences include the latch for unlocking the frame pulls down rather than up, the ejector is different, and the Swift model does not have the "hammer the hammer action" of later models. The gun fired a .38 S&W black powder cartridge, and is not safe to shoot with modern smokeless powder cartridges. The hammerless model differed from the hammer model in that it did not have an external hammer protruding from the gun, and it had the addition of a manual safety on the trigger. This feature required the user to place a finger squarely on the trigger to fire the gun. It has the word "Swift" engraved on the top of the gun, and the serial number is stamped under the left grip panel.

=== Safety automatic ===
Standard models with external hammer:

- First Model (1894–1895), single post latch system
- Second Model (1896–1908), double post latch system
- Third Model (1909–1941), double post latch system, adapted for smokeless powder

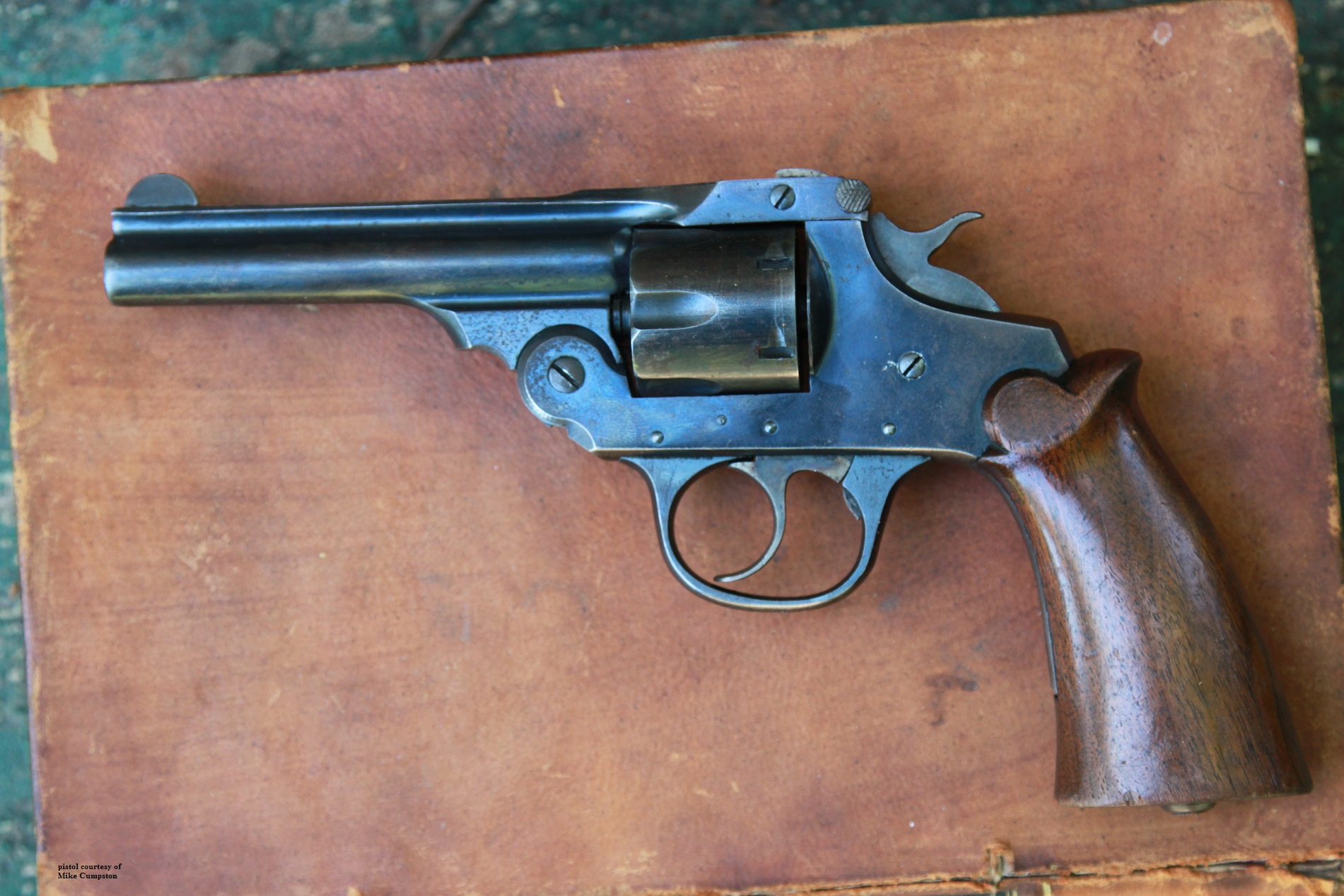
This variation of an Iver Johnson Safety Automatic "New Model", with the pictured "Western" grips, was catalogued in the 1940 Shooter's Bible.

=== Safety automatic hammerless ===
- First Model (1895–1896), single post latch
- Second Model (1897–1908), safety lever added to face of trigger
- Third Model (a.k.a. "New Model") (1909–1941), no safety lever on trigger, adapted for smokeless powder

== Assassinations ==
=== William McKinley assassination ===
On September 6, 1901, American steelworker and anarchist Leon Czolgosz shot US President William McKinley at the Temple of Music in Buffalo, New York, with an Iver Johnson .32 caliber Safety Automatic revolver. McKinley died eight days later. The revolver is on display at the Buffalo History Museum in Buffalo.

=== Franklin D. Roosevelt attempted assassination ===
In 1933, Giuseppe Zangara shot and killed Chicago mayor Anton Cermak at a political event in Miami, in an apparent attempt to assassinate president-elect Franklin D. Roosevelt. Zangara was using a .32 revolver by the United States Revolver Company, a subsidiary of Iver Johnson.

=== Robert Kennedy assassination ===
Jordanian Sirhan Sirhan assassinated presidential candidate United States Senator Robert F. Kennedy with an eight-shot Iver Johnson Cadet 55-A revolver chambered in .22 Long Rifle at the Ambassador Hotel in Los Angeles, California, on June 5, 1968; Kennedy died the following day at Good Samaritan Hospital. The revolver, as well as the official police files, reports, interviews, ballistics reports, bullet fragments, and other important evidence related to Kennedy's assassination, is housed in the California State Archives in Sacramento.

== Bicycles ==
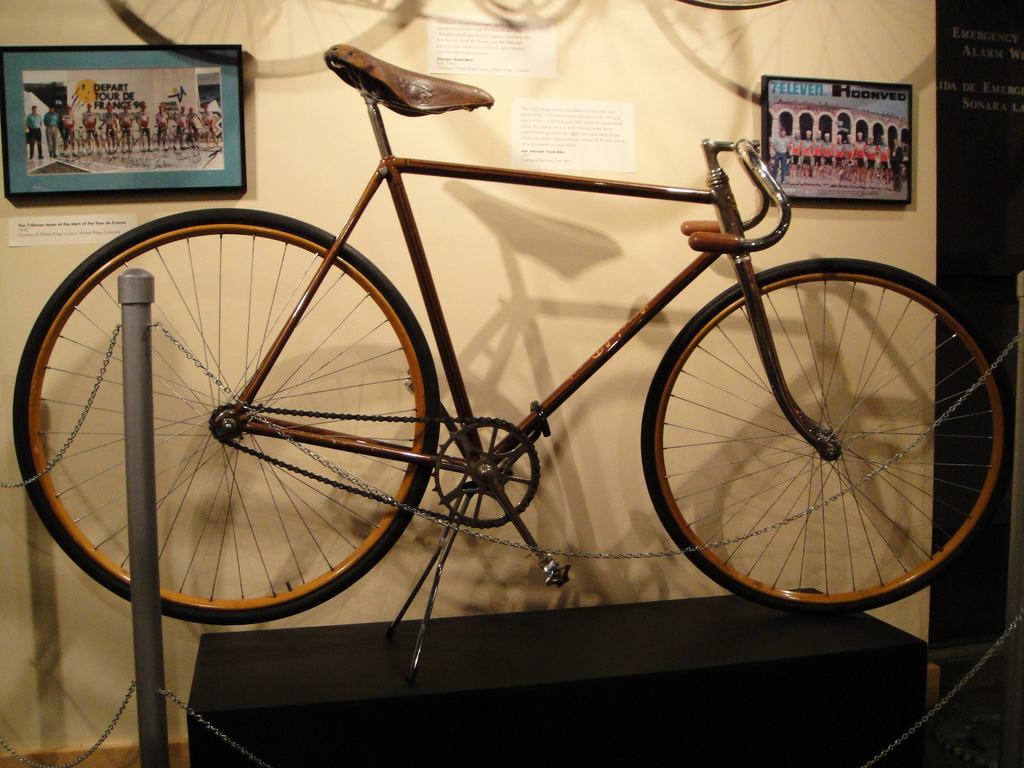
1927 Iver Johnson model 90 bicycle

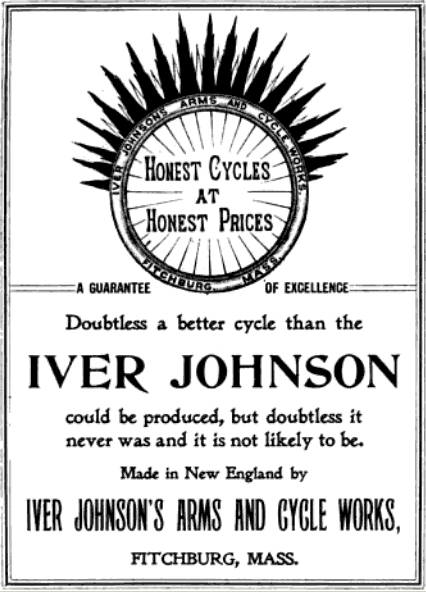
Iver Johnson Arms & Cycle Works - "Honest cycles at honest prices" - 1897

Iver Johnson had a very productive bicycle manufacturing and sales business line during the bicycle boom of the late 19th and early 20th centuries. Iver Johnsons are considered to be "classics" by vintage bicycle collectors, and are considered especially pleasing from an aesthetic point of view. O.F. Mossberg worked in the bicycle plant and then started his own firearms factory.

Even when they were new, I-J's were marketed and had a reputation for being very graceful looking, well built, and engineered for performance. Iver Johnson sponsored the career of bicycle racing champion Major Taylor beginning in 1900. One 1924 I-J model had a truss-bridge frame which featured a curved tube under the top tube to strengthen the frame for use on the rough roads of the early twentieth century. Bicycle production ceased in 1940 with the buildup of arms production prior to World War II.

Iver Johnson bicycles are highly collectible, sought after, and relatively rare compared to most other major manufacturer's products from that time. As of 1974 an Iver Johnson bicycle is on display at the Smithsonian Institution's National Museum of American History in the America on the Move exhibit.

== Motorcycles ==
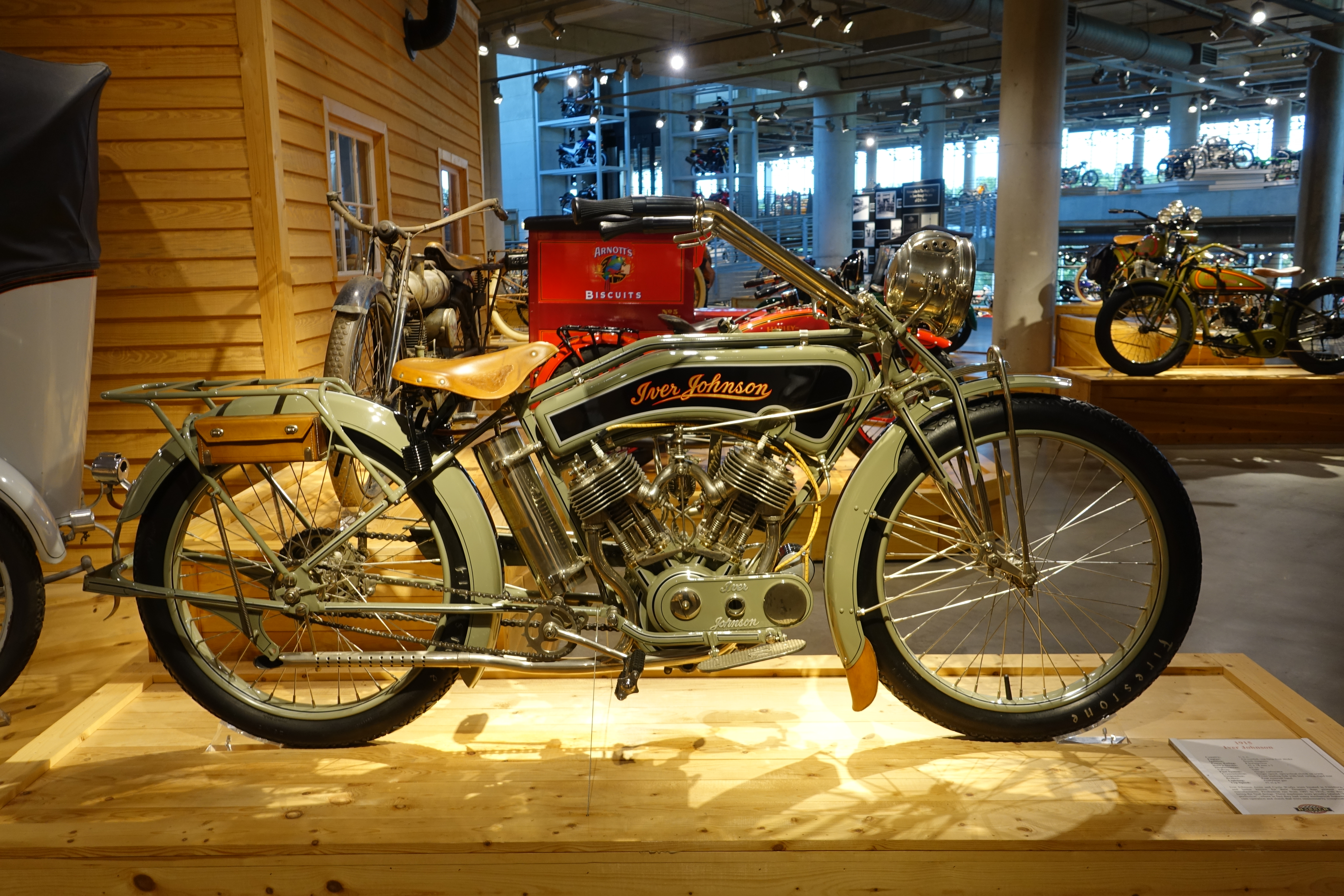
1915 Iver Johnson motorcycle on display at the Barber Vintage Motorsports Museum, Birmingham, Alabama. The V-twin motorcycle had a displacement of 1049cc and a top speed of 45 mph.

The Iver Johnson Company motorcycle division was launched in Fitchburg, Massachusetts, in 1907, born from the conversion of a line of business that had been manufacturing bicycles for some 23 years.

According to Roland Brown's History of the Motorcycle, Iver Johnson advertised their machines as "Mechanical Perfection,” an exaggerated boast that nonetheless stood on a number of advanced design features, especially in their later models. These included dual crankshafts, nickel-alloy machined parts, chain drive, and a hand-operated three-speed gearbox. Among collectors and researchers, Iver-Johnsons, such as the 1915 Model 15-7, along with Scotts, are the finest examples of motorcycle engineering of that era.

Ultimately, the arms division of the business was growing so rapidly to meet demand that management decided to focus on that market and close motorcycle operations in 1916 (varying sources claim the last year as being 1915, with 1916 seeing only the sales of remaining 1915 produced inventory).

== Revival of the Iver Johnson name ==
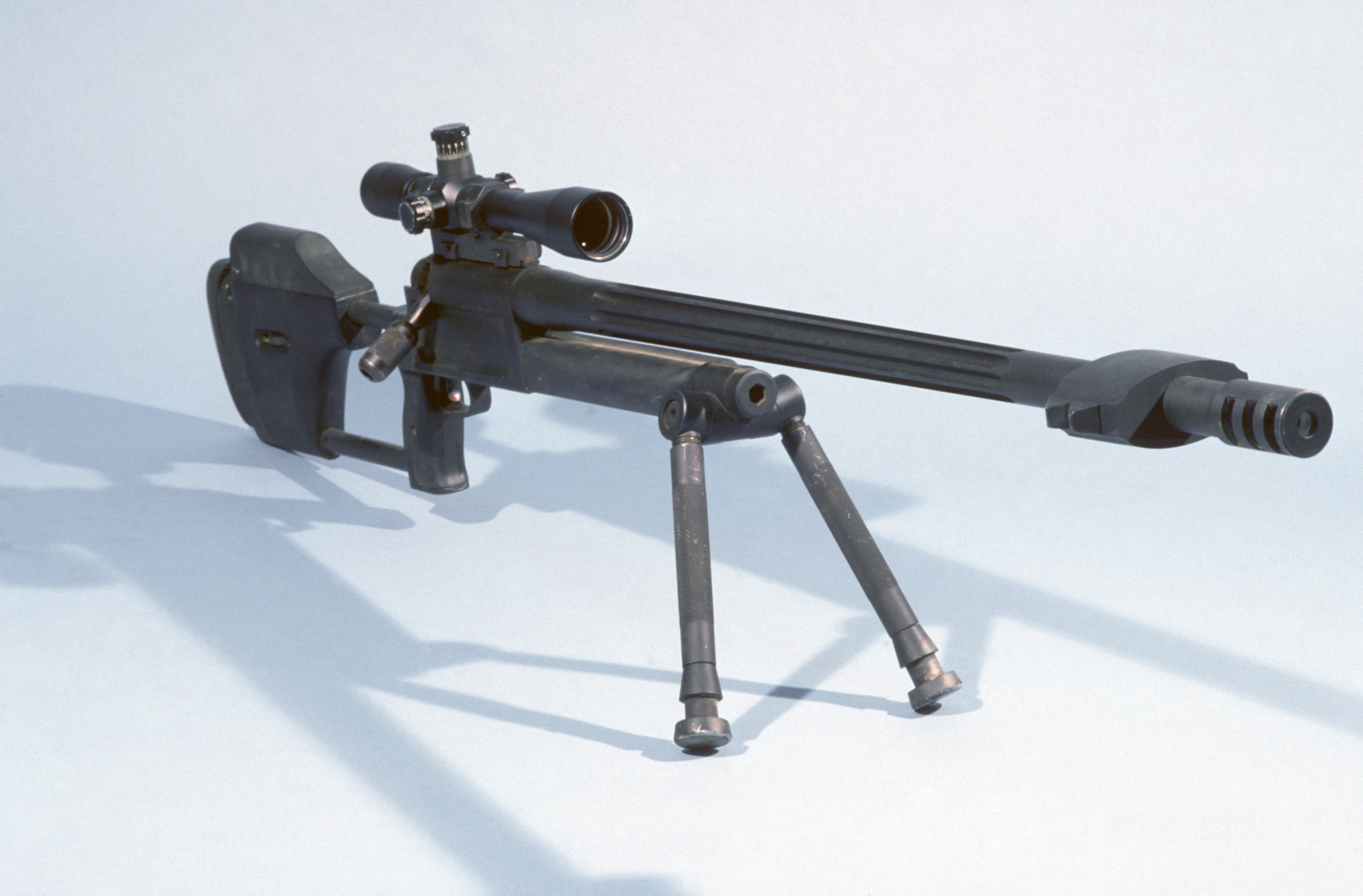
An Iver Johnson RAI 500 - sniper rifle made by the present Iver Johnson Arms, Inc.

In 2006, the name was reused as Iver Johnson Arms Incorporated in Florida as a manufacturer and importer of firearms (from other manufacturers based in Philippines, Turkey, and Belgium), including 1911-style semi-automatic pistols unrelated to the old Iver Johnson lines. The firm was renamed from Squires Bingham International, founded in 1973.

== See also ==
- Iver Johnson Enforcer
