= Rocco Verduci =

Italian revolutionary

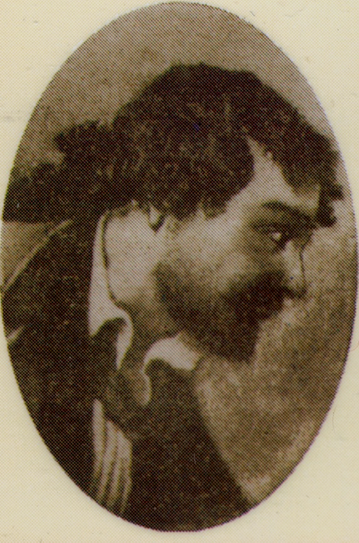
- Portrait of Verduci by unknown author
- Born: Rocco Pietro Virduci; 3 August 1824; Caraffa del Bianco, Kingdom of the Two Sicilies (present-day Italy)
- Died: 2 October 1847 (aged 23); Gerace, Kingdom of the Two Sicilies
- Cause of death: Executed
- Citizenship: Kingdom of the Two Sicilies
- Occupation: Revolutionary
- Years active: 1847
- Known for: Leadership of the 1847 Gerace Revolt
- Movement: Insurrection of 1847 in the Two Sicilies

Rocco Verduci (3 August 1824, Caraffa del Bianco – 2 October 1847, Gerace) was an Italian revolutionary and martyr of the Insurrection of 1847 in the Two Sicilies.

During the insurrection in the Kingdom of the Two Sicilies of September 1847, Verduci led the rebellion in the district of Gerace. The aims of the insurrection were the unification of Italy and the abolition of the monarchy. After having taken over several villages, and proclaimed the suppression of the taxes on imports and exports and the reduction by half of the costs of salt and tobacco, the rebellion in the district of Gerace was eventually crushed by the arrival of royal troops. The revolutionary leaders, including Verduci, had to flee to the mountains, where they were eventually denounced, arrested, and sentenced to death. Rocco Verduci (aged 23) and four other members of the Gerace Revolt were executed in Gerace on the morning of October 2nd, 1847, and are today remembered as the Five Martyrs of Gerace.
