= William Sinnott =

Recipient of the Congressional Gold Medal (1886–1965)

- Born: August 14, 1886; Florida
- Died: March 29, 1965 (aged 78); Miami Beach, Florida
- Occupation(s): Detective; Bodyguard

William Sinnott (14 August 1886 – 29 March 1965) was an American detective and bodyguard who was awarded a Congressional Gold Medal in 1940 in recognition of his service to President Franklin D. Roosevelt during an assassination attempt in 1933.

== Bodyguard and assassination attempt ==
Sinnott worked as a detective in New York and was frequently assigned as a bodyguard to then President-elect of the United States Franklin D. Roosevelt. He was on vacation to Miami, Florida in early February 1933 when was called to assist Roosevelt's security staff as he was to attend a reception in the city.

On 15 February 1933, during a night speech by Roosevelt in Miami, Florida, Italian immigrant Giuseppe Zangara fired five shots with a handgun he had purchased a couple of days before. He missed his target and instead injured five bystanders and killed Anton Cermak, the Mayor of Chicago. Sinnott was hit and suffered a superficial head wound, but fully recovered after the fragments were removed.

In 1940 Sinnott was awarded a Congressional Gold Medal in recognition of his service to Roosevelt during the assassination attempt. He donated the bullet fragment to the Franklin D. Roosevelt Presidential Library and Museum in 1946 where it remains on display.

== Text of legislation ==
Saturday, 15 June 1940

AN ACT

To authorize the presentation of a special gold medal to William Sinnott.

Be it enacted by the Senate and House of Representatives of the United States of America in Congress assembled, That the President is authorized to present a special gold medal to William Sinnott, a detective, who in guarding Franklin D. Roosevelt, then President-elect of the United States, at Miami, Florida, on February 15, 1933, was shot and wounded by Giuseppe Zangara, who attempted to assassinate said Franklin D. Roosevelt. 54 Stat. 1283
