= Gerace =

Gerace Griko: Geràkion/Gèrakas
- Comune
- Città di Gerace
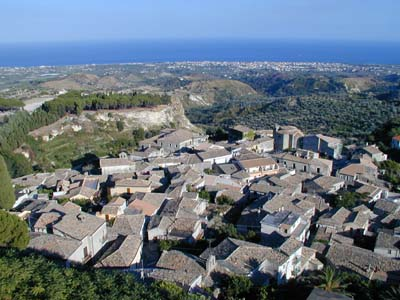
- Panorama of Gerace

- Coat of arms

- Location within Italy Location within Calabria
- Coordinates: 38°16′N 16°13′E
- Country: Italy
- Region: Calabria
- Metropolitan city: Reggio Calabria (RC)

Government
  - Mayor: Giuseppe Pezzimenti

Area
  - Total: 35 km^{2} (14 sq mi)
- Elevation: 500 m (1,600 ft)

Population (31 December 2012)
  - Total: 2,715
  - Density: 78/km^{2} (200/sq mi)
- Demonym: Geracesi
- Time zone: UTC+1 (CET)
  - Summer (DST): UTC+2 (CEST)
- Postal code: 89040
- Dialing code: 0964
- Website: Official website

Gerace (Italian pronunciation: [dʒeˈraːtʃe]; Greek: Γερακιον, romanized: Gerakion, also known as Hierax) is a town and comune in the Metropolitan City of Reggio Calabria, Calabria, southern Italy. Gerace is located some 10 kilometres (6 mi) inland from Locri, yet the latter town and the sea can be seen from Gerace's perch atop a 500-metre (1,600 ft) vertical rock. The town stands on a hill formed of conglomerates of sea fossils from 60 million years ago. It is one of I Borghi più belli d'Italia ("The most beautiful villages of Italy").

== History ==
The name of the city derives from the Greek hierax (ἱέραξ) ("sparrowhawk"). According to a legend, the inhabitants of the coast, fleeing from a Saracen attack in 915 CE, were led by a sparrowhawk to the mountains commanding the area of Locri, and here they founded the city. Archeological findings showed that the area was in fact inhabited since the Neolithic Age; also traces of Sicel presence have been found.

Later, even during the highest splendour of Locri, the hill was inhabited and was later the site of a Roman military garrison. After the Byzantine reconquest of Italy in the 6th century, the town became an administrative, military and religious capital under the name of Santa Ciriaca.

In 986 the Saracens briefly conquered the city, but it returned to Byzantine control until the Norman conquest in 1059. Gerace was seat of a principality under the Normans, whose symbol was the Castle of the Hautville or Altavilla. It subsequently followed the history of the Kingdom of Naples. During the Sicilian Vespers (late 13th century), Gerace was occupied by the Aragonese Admiral Roger of Lauria who turned it into his own feudal estate; later it became a "Royal City".

In 1348 it became a county, a possession of the Caracciolos, Gonzalo de Córdoba and, as a principality, of the Grimaldi (end of the 16th century). With the abolition of feudalism in 1806, Gerace became district capital.

In 1847, the population of the district of Gerace rebelled, but the insurrection was eventually repressed by royal troops, and the leaders (including Rocco Verduci) were sentenced and executed in Gerace.

A new modern town, Gerace Marina, was built on the coast in the 19th century to house new public buildings. The name was changed to Locri in 1934.

== Main sights ==
The main attractions of Gerace are the remains of the old Norman Castle (probably begun in the 10th century by the Byzantines) at the top of Gerace, and the perfectly preserved medieval town. It was once home to 128 churches; the most noteworthy amongst the remaining ones include:

- Church of St. Francis (13th century), containing a precious Baroque altar.
- The Norman Cathedral, the largest religious building in Calabria, including the prison of the Five Martyrs of Gerace (1045). It has a nave and two aisles, each divided by 13 columns coming from the ancient temples of Locri. The crypt is accessible also. It has also a museum, founded in 1996.
- The tiny Greek-Orthodox church of San Giovannello ("Little St. John"), built in the 10th century.
- Santa Maria del Mastro (1083), of Greek rite until 1480.
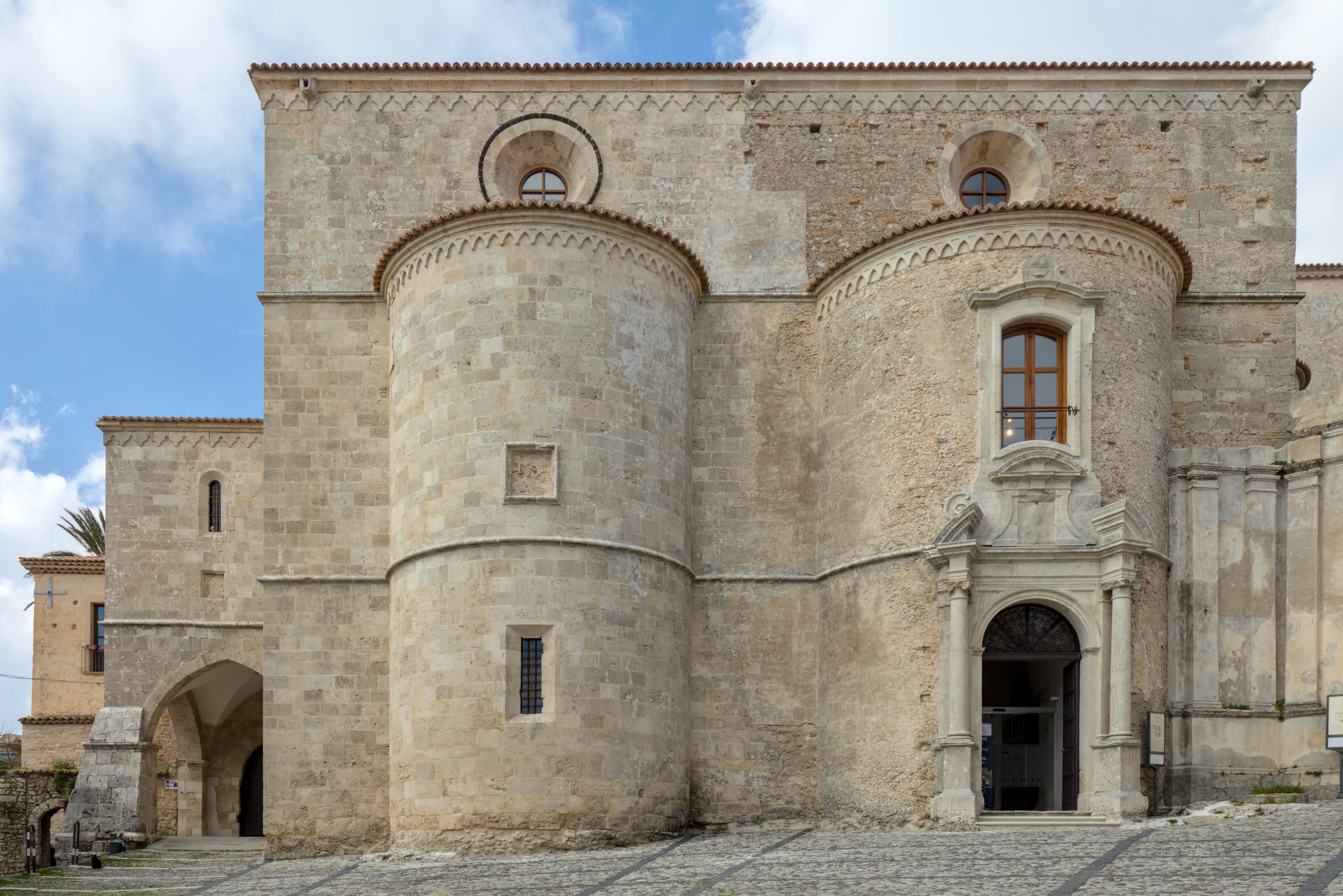
Cathedral of Gerace

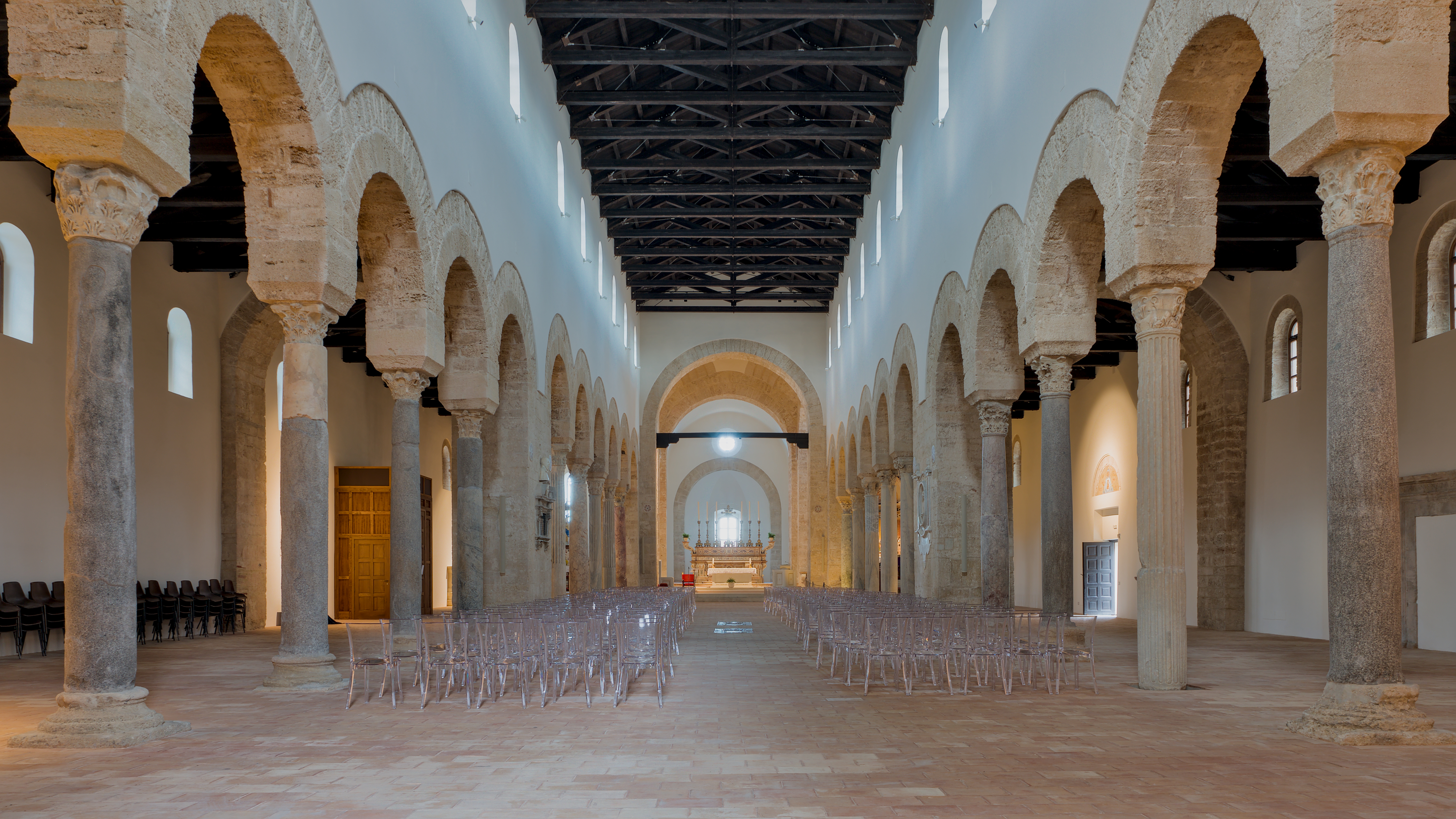
Interior of the Cathedral

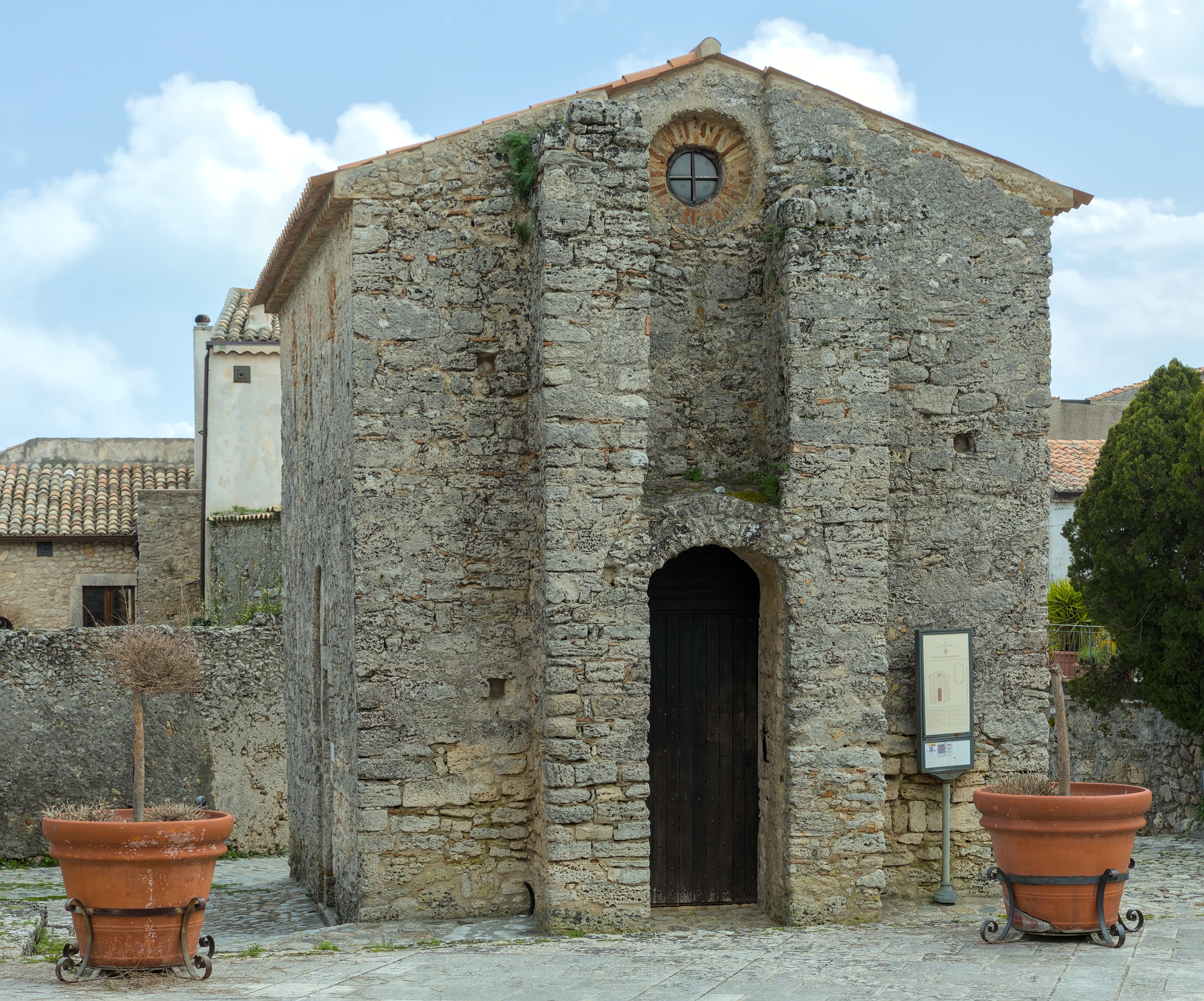
Church of San Giovannello

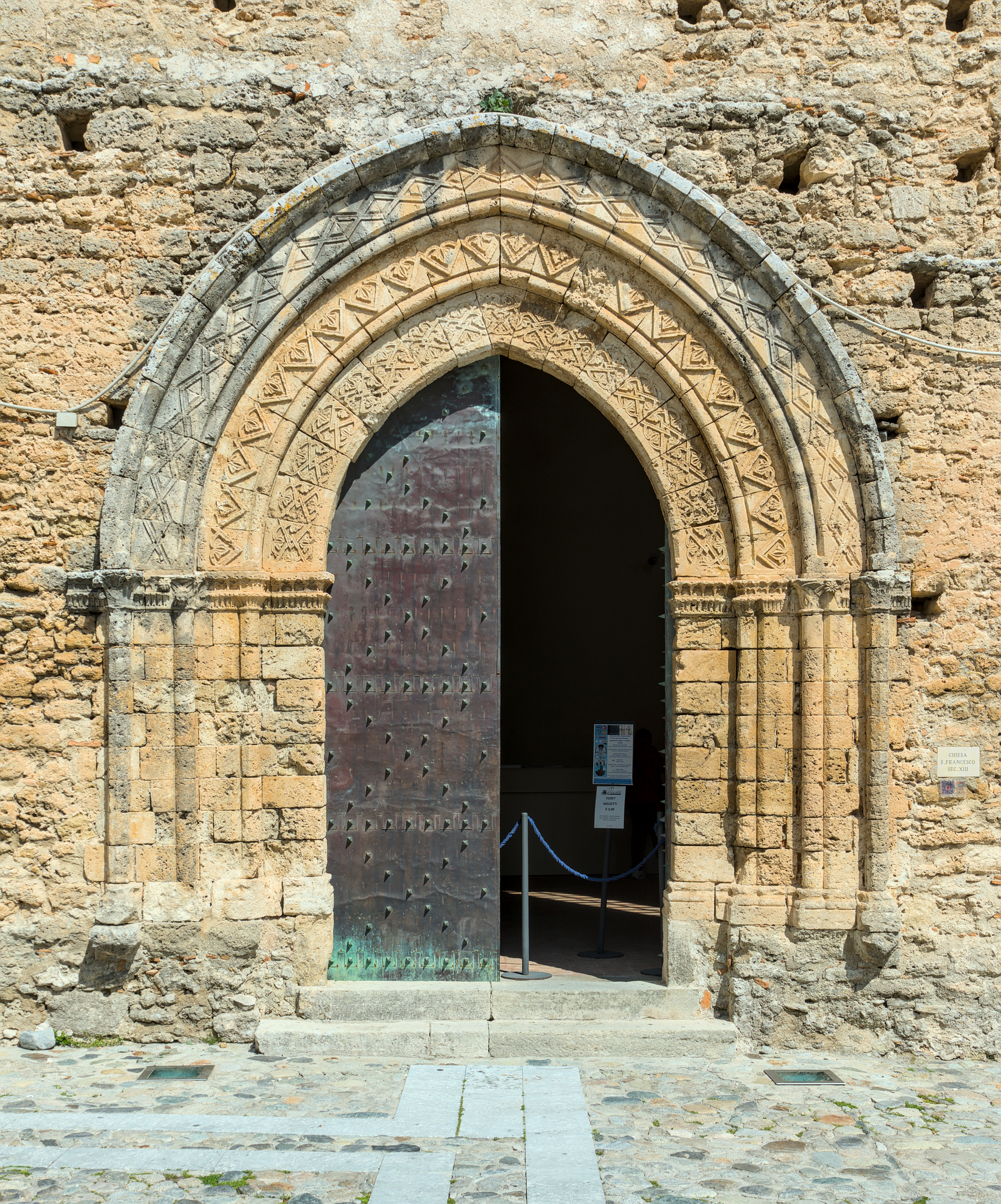
Portal of the church of St. Francis

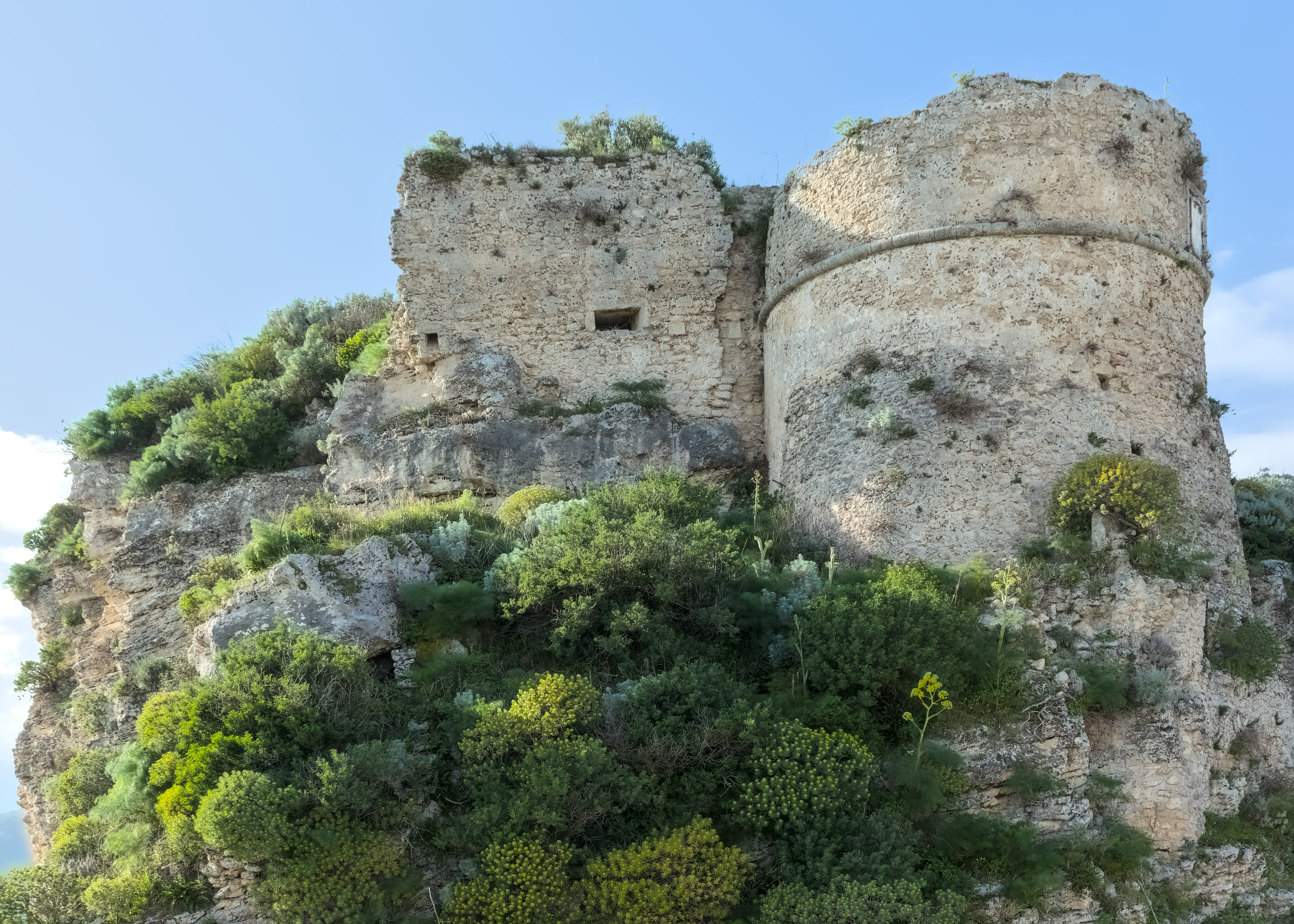
The ruins of the castle
