= Bianco =

- Comune
- Comune di Bianco
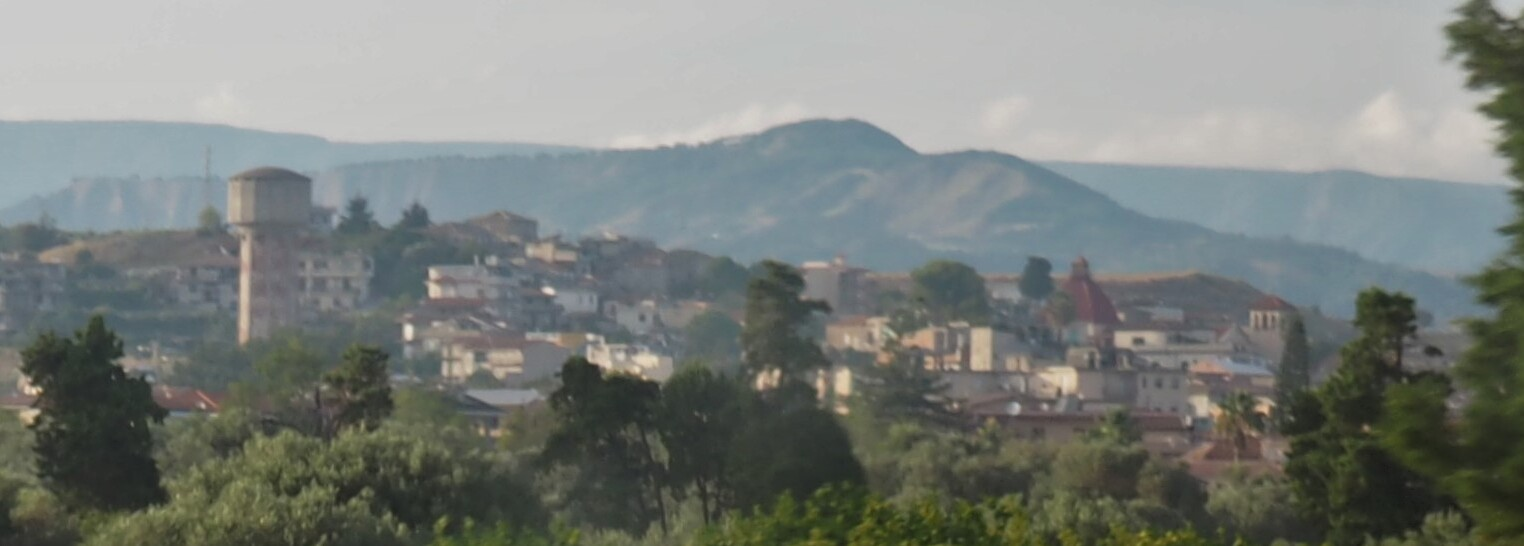

- Location within Italy Location within Calabria
- Coordinates: 38°05′N 16°09′E
- Country: Italy
- Region: Calabria
- Metropolitan city: Reggio Calabria (RC)
- Frazioni: Pardesca

Government
  - Mayor: Cosimo Marafioti

Area
  - Total: 31 km^{2} (12 sq mi)

Population (2007)
  - Total: 4,310
  - Density: 140/km^{2} (360/sq mi)
- Demonym: Bianchesi
- Time zone: UTC+1 (CET)
  - Summer (DST): UTC+2 (CEST)
- Postal code: 89032
- Dialing code: 0964
- Patron saint: Madonna of Pugliano
- Saint day: August 15

Bianco is a comune (municipality) in the province of Reggio Calabria, in the Italian region of Calabria. It is a seaside town and a popular tourist resort. The main attractions are the remainings of an old abbey and the ruins of a Roman house.

== See also ==
- Calabrian wine
