= Sant'Agata del Bianco =

- Comune
- Comune di Sant'Agata del Bianco
- Coat of arms

- Location within Italy Location within Calabria
- Coordinates: 38°6′N 16°5′E
- Country: Italy
- Region: Calabria
- Metropolitan city: Reggio Calabria (RC)

Government
  - Mayor: Domenico Stranieri

Area
  - Total: 18.9 km^{2} (7.3 sq mi)
- Elevation: 436 m (1,430 ft)

Population (December 2007)
  - Total: 698
  - Density: 36.9/km^{2} (95.7/sq mi)
- Time zone: UTC+1 (CET)
  - Summer (DST): UTC+2 (CEST)
- Postal code: 89030
- Dialing code: 0964
- Patron saint: St. Agatha

Sant'Agata del Bianco is a comune (municipality) in the Province of Reggio Calabria in the Italian region Calabria, located about 100 kilometres (62 mi) southwest of Catanzaro and about 35 kilometres (22 mi) east of Reggio Calabria.

The great writer Saverio Strati was born in Sant'Agata del Bianco in 1924. Strati is the author of many books including, "Miti Racconti e Leggende di Calabria" a collection of legends and stories that gives insight into the traditions and culture of the Calabrese, as well as novels and dramas that describe the emigrant experience of the poor from the region.
