= Gerlando Alberti =

Member of the Sicilian Mafia

Gerlando Alberti at a Mafia trial in the 1970s.

Gerlando Alberti (Italian pronunciation: [dʒerˈlando alˈbɛrti]; 18 September 1927 – 1 February 2012), nicknamed 'u Paccarè ("the imperturbable one"), was a member of the Sicilian Mafia. He belonged to the Porta Nuova family in Palermo headed by Giuseppe Calò.

Alberti was involved in numerous notorious Mafia events, such as the Ciaculli massacre in 1963, the Viale Lazio massacre in 1969, the disappearance of journalist Mauro De Mauro in 1970, and the killing of Chief Prosecutor Pietro Scaglione in 1971. He was one of the top mafiosi involved in cigarette smuggling and heroin trafficking in the 1970s. He once said of the Mafia: "Mafia! What is that? A kind of cheese?"

== Early career ==
Alberti was the son of a fruit seller and was born and grew up in Palermo, in the derelict district of Danisinni. He was born at home; the midwife begged to be allowed to bring his mother to the front door because of the lack of daylight in the house. He only went to school for four years. Alberti was initiated into the Mafia by Gaetano Filippone. His first test was to steal an entire cheese. In 1956 he was acquitted of a killing for lack of evidence.

In the 1950s and 1960s, Alberti was considered to be an upstart Mafia boss in the shadow of men like Pietro Torretta, Tommaso Buscetta and the La Barbera brothers. They formed the so-called "New Mafia", which adopted new gangster techniques. Those starting their careers in their shadow were forming into new generation of mafiosi; they had initiative, and the road to leadership of a cosca had suddenly become quicker and more readily available to those who were fast with their tommy-guns.

Alberti's official business was selling textiles, employing a squad of travelling salesmen, a wonderful cover for both his trafficking operations and smuggling jewels and works of art (he allegedly possessed a Caravaggio Nativity). In 1961 he set up a textile trading business in Milan and formed a cosca in Northern Italy, with bases in Genoa and Milan.

== Mafia killer? ==
Alberti was indicted in July 1963 with 53 other mafiosi after the Ciaculli massacre, which turned the First Mafia War into a war against the Mafia. Together with Tommaso Buscetta, he was suspected of the attack against Angelo La Barbera, one of the protagonists of the war, in Milan in May 1963. At the "Trial of the 114" he was acquitted but sent into internal exile in a village in Lombardy. Alberti, although living in Milan, had been in Palermo at the time of the bomb attack in Ciaculli. Interrogated, he declared that he had been with a woman and could not reveal her name.

In December 1969 he was again in Palermo (while he was supposed to be in exile) when Mafia boss Michele Cavataio was killed by a Mafia hit squad for his double-crossing role in the First Mafia War. At the time, the Carabinieri began to consider Alberti as the boss of a kind of Murder Incorporated for the Sicilian Cosa Nostra.

== Rising star ==
Alberti was one of the rising stars of the Mafia in the 1970s. He had a luxurious lifestyle with apartments in Milan and Naples, he owned a green Maserati and he and his men spent their evenings at nightclubs with expensive women. His position was confirmed on 17 June 1970, when the traffic police in Milan stopped an Alfa Romeo for speeding. In the car were Alberti, Tommaso Buscetta, Salvatore "Ciaschiteddu" Greco, Gaetano Badalamenti and Giuseppe Calderone. Unaware of the identity of the men in the car the police let them continue their journey. At the time, they were involved in a series of meetings about the future of Cosa Nostra. They decided to set up a new Sicilian Mafia Commission (the first one was dissolved after the Ciaculli massacre) – initially headed by a triumvirate consisting of Gaetano Badalamenti, Stefano Bontade and the Corleonesi boss Luciano Leggio.

On 5 May 1971, Pietro Scaglione, Chief Prosecutor of Palermo, was killed along with his driver Antonino Lo Russo. It was the first time since the end of World War II that the Mafia had carried out a hit on an Italian magistrate. The police rounded up 114 mafiosi who would be tried in the second "Trial of the 114". Scaglione was killed in the district under Alberti’s command. Alberti had arrived from Naples just before the attack and left immediately afterwards. A barman who had confirmed to the police that Alberti was in Palermo while Scaglione’s murder was taking place was kidnapped and killed.

At the second "Trial of the 114" in 1974, Alberti was convicted and sentenced to six years. Sent to the island of Asinara, he escaped in June 1975 but was arrested again in December that year, hiding among Sicilians in Northern Italy. In October 1977 he became a fugitive again when he was supposed to appear before a court in Naples charged with cigarette smuggling.

== Heroin lab ==
In March 1974, Alberti was charged in Rome with heroin trafficking as the result of a 30-month investigation. The inquiry started in September 1971 when US Customs agents seized 84 kilos of heroin in a Ford that was sent from Genoa to New York. Alberti and Gaetano Badalamenti were considered to be among the bosses of the international ring.

On 25 August 1980, two heroin-refining labs were discovered on Sicily; a small lab was discovered first in Trabia and later that day a bigger lab was uncovered in Carini that could produce 50 kilograms a week. Alberti was arrested with three Corsican chemists in Trabia, among them André Bousquet an old hand from the French Connection days, who was sent by Corsican gangster Gaetan Zampa. On his arrest, Alberti asked, "Mafia! What is that? A kind of cheese?", denying any knowledge or association with the crime.

== Attempt on life ==
Alberti was considered to be part of a moderate wing at the start of the 1981-83 Second Mafia War, allied with Gaetano Badalamenti and Stefano Bontade, against the Corleonesi led by Totò Riina. He barely survived an attempt on his life while incarcerated in the Ucciardone prison on 9 February 1983. He received two sentences, one for the heroin lab in Trabia and one life sentence for the killing of a hotel owner who had tipped off the police about the lab.

Due to his conviction and his links with the men on the losing side of the Second Mafia War, Alberti’s role in Cosa Nostra shrank. On 20 June 2006, the ageing Alberti was arrested again when authorities issued 52 arrest warrants against the top echelon of Cosa Nostra in the city of Palermo (Operation Gotha). Despite his life sentence he had been granted house arrest due to poor health. On January 21, 2008, the Palermo Court absolved Alberti in relation the Gotha investigation, but he received an 8 years and 5 months sentence in appeal.

He was arrested again on 16 December 2008, when the Carabinieri arrested 94 Mafiosi in Operation Perseo. He was among the men who wanted to re-establish the Sicilian Mafia Commission that had not been functioning since the arrest of Totò Riina in 1993. In October 2010, he was sentenced to 6 years and 4 months. Due to his age and suffering from cancer he was put under house arrest. He died on 1 February 2012, in his house in the Porta Nuova district of Palermo.

== Sources ==
- Fabrizio Calvi (1993). L'Europe des Parrains: La Mafia à l'assaut de l'Europe. Grasset & Fasquelle. ISBN 2-246-46061-1.
- Joseph Farrell (15 November 1997). Understanding the Mafia. Manchester University Press. ISBN 978-0-7190-4900-2.
- Saverio Lodato (1994). Quindici anni di Mafia: La guerra che lo stato può ancora vincere. ISBN 978-88-17-11632-9.
- Servadio, Gaia (1976), Mafioso. A history of the Mafia from its origins to the present day, London: Secker & Warburg ISBN 0-436-44700-2
- Tim Shawcross; Martin Young (1987). Men of Honour: The Confessions of Tommaso Buscetta. HarperCollins. ISBN 9780002175890.
