= Il Capo dei Capi =

2007 Italian television series

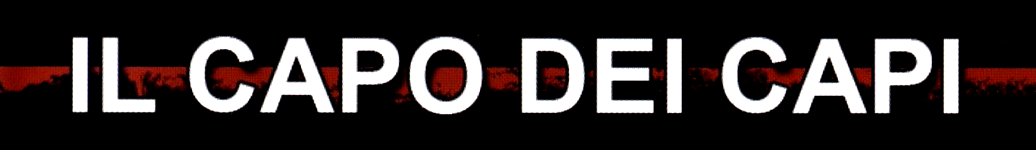
- Genre: Biographical drama; Crime drama; Serial drama; Police procedural
- Created by: Enzo Monteleone; Alexis Sweet
- Starring: Claudio Gioè; Daniele Liotti; Simona Cavallari; Salvatore Lazzaro; Marco Leonardi; Gioia Spaziani; Claudio Castrogiovanni; Francesco Scianna
- Country of origin: Italy
- Original language: Italian
- No. of episodes: 6

Production
- Producer: Pietro Valsecchi
- Editors: Stefano Bises; Claudio Fava; Domenico Starnone
- Running time: 90 minutes

Original release
- Network: Canale 5
- Release: 25 October – 29 November 2007

Il Capo dei Capi (The Boss of the Bosses) is an Italian biographical crime drama miniseries which debuted on Canale 5 in October and November 2007. It tells the story of Salvatore Riina, alias Totò u Curtu (Totò the Short), a mafioso boss from Corleone, Sicily. Riina is played by Palermo-born actor, Claudio Gioè, and the series was directed by Alexis Sweet and Enzo Monteleone. The series is inspired from the eponymous book-inquiry of Giuseppe D'Avanzo and Attilio Bolzoni. It was broadcast in the UK in the spring of 2013 on the Sky Arts channel, retitled Corleone and split into 12 one-hour episodes.

== Plot ==
=== First episode (1943–1958) ===
Palermo, January 15, 1993. Cosa Nostra 'superboss' Salvatore Riina has been arrested after 23 years, and receives a visit in prison from his childhood friend, Biagio Schirò, triggering a flashback. In 1943, as a 13-year-old boy, Riina is working in the fields around the town of Corleone when he finds a buried bomb. His father decides to take the bomb home because he wants to extract the gunpowder from inside to sell it to hunters in order to supplement his very low farm labourer's income. The bomb explodes, killing Riina's father and younger brother, Ciccio, and leaving Salvatore as the head of the family to lead a life of misery.

Tired of living in poverty, Totò, together with his friends Bernardo Provenzano (aka Binnu), Calogero Bagarella (Calò) and Biagio Schirò, begins to work for Luciano Liggio, Picciotto of the boss Michele Navarra, who meanwhile orders the kidnapping and murder of the Socialist trade unionist Placido Rizzotto. Soon after, Totò gets into a murderous fight with Menico, the son of a miller to whom he sells his grain, and ends up in prison; meanwhile Schirò's change of heart takes him back to school. Six years later, Totò, an adult by now, is freed. Waiting outside the prison gates are Provenzano, Bagarella and a new member of the gang, Luciano Maino.

Riina soon picks up where he left off in Liggio's gang: intent on more power and infamy, the gang murder the capo Michele Navarra and plan to expand towards Palermo. Schirò, meanwhile, has become a police officer and is working with commissioner Angelo Mangano on Liggio and his gang. Totò meets the studious younger sister of Calogero Bagarella, Ninetta, and falls in love. It soon emerges that Ninetta is a close friend of Teresa, who in turn is dating Biagio Schirò.

=== Second episode (1963–1969) ===
The full Corleonesi Clan (Luciano Liggio, Totò Riina, Bernardo Provenzano, Calogero Bagarella and Luciano Maino) prepare to go to Palermo for a 'business conversation' with Salvatore La Barbera and Vito Ciancimino. As soon as they arrive, they begin straight away to demand respect: first killing a butcher who is late in paying for a load of clandestine meat, then killing an accountant who had paid protection to the wrong crime family. One evening, while the Corleonesi are in a night club (where Maino meets a girl, Maria Nigro) Salvatore La Barbera is kidnapped and killed by Michele Cavataio. All the other mafiosi in La Barbera's clan flee from Palermo.

Back in Corleone, Totò's relationship with Ninetta Bagarella strengthens. Biagio discovers from Teresa that word has it that Riina will be at Ninetta's one evening, and organizes a search. Nevertheless, Totò manages to hide both himself and his friend Calogero, and neither are caught. Totò promises to Ninetta not to enact revenge on Teresa for the betrayal, but she tells him that she had already decided to break all links to her friend, rather to continue her relationship in secret with him.

On June 30, 1963, in the Ciaculli quarter of Palermo, a carabinieri officer notices a parked Alfa Giulietta. Unaware that the car is packed with explosives, an officer opens the boot which triggers the bomb inside which kills seven people. This leads to many arrests, with many other mafiosi, including the Corleonesi, going into hiding. Maino refuses to do so, preferring to stay in Palermo with his girlfriend Maria. While fleeing from Corleone, Totò and Calogero are stopped by a police patrol. Calogero manages to escape but Totò is arrested; he attempts to provide forged identity documents but these fail when he is recognized by Biagio.

A few days later, Biagio tells Teresa (who has just graduated) that Riina has been caught, and that the two can marry without threat. At the same time, an eavesdropping Ninetta (also recently graduated) overhears everything. Schirò goes to the parents of Teresa to ask her hand in marriage and, after an awkward conversation with her father, is given their blessing.

Meanwhile, Maria, Maino's girlfriend, discovers his hidden life via the newspapers, and convinces him to go to the police. He tells Judge Cesare Terranova everything he knows about the Corleonesi. Shortly after, Luciano Liggio too is arrested by commissioner Mangano and Schirò, discovered hiding in the wardrobe of Leoluchina Sorisi, the ex-girlfriend of the murdered Placido Rizzotto.

The Bari trial begins, and Maino stands as witness, pointing directly at Totò and his companions, and testifying to all of their murders. Despite this concrete proof, Liggio, Riina and the other convicts are released thanks to a lack of evidence - the jury had been threatened. A few days after the trial, Luciano Maino is found hanging at his home.

=== Third episode (1969-1978) ===
Biagio and Teresa have married, and have a baby (Antonio) at the beginning of the episode. Simultaneously Riina and his fellow mafiosi - Provenzano, Bagarella, Vito Maranza and another man, soldier of Tano Badalamenti, boss of Cinisi - enter the offices of Michele Cavataio dressed with uniforms of the Guardia di Finanza. The aim of the attack is to assassinate Michele Cavataio, who had earlier killed Salvatore La Barbera.

The Badalamenti's henchman, nervously lets his gun fire, killing two men and triggering a massacre - no longer under cover, they have to murder three others before reaching Cavataio. Following a spree of bullets, Cavataio feigns death until Totò and Calogero enter, when he turns and shoots, hitting and killing Bagarella. Enraged, Provenzano responds by beating Cavataio to death with the butt of his gun (Viale Lazio massacre).

In Corleone, Totò informs his own sister, and girlfriend of Calogero, Arcangela, of his friends death. He then calls on his Ninetta, Calogero's sister, calling her away from her teaching job and giving her the news; meanwhile Schirò requests a transfer to Palermo. Needing cash in order to make key investments in Palermo, Riina decides to kidnap the young lad, Antonio Caruso, from the town hall while visiting now mayor Vito Ciancimino. This triggers the disdain of the mafiosi of Palermo, in particular bosses Stefano Bontade and Giuseppe Di Cristina.

On May 5, 1971, Riina orders the homicide of District Attorney Pietro Scaglione, and during the ambush the police escort agent Antonio Lo Russo is also killed. Totò wishes to flee with Ninetta to Venice, and marry. Having not found the body of Bagarella, the police decide to search the home of Totò's sister, Arcangela, and find a photo of Ninetta and Totò in San Marco Square. Implicated, the police arrest Ninetta. During her trial, Vito Maranza, one of Riina's men, goes to Biagio's house and kidnaps Teresa and Antonio, holding them to ransom until Bagarella is released.

Luciano Liggio is arrested in Milan by commissioner Mangano, as a consequence Riina becomes the main capo of the Corleonesi Clan, and is chosen by Don Michele Greco as his 'prediletto' (his favourite).

Two of Riina's soldati are ordered to kill Giuseppe Di Cristina but fail, killing instead his driver. Shadowing Di Cristina, they discover that he is collaborating with commissioner Boris Giuliano. Meanwhile, Totò and Ninetta get married.

Some of the mafiosi - Pippo Calderone, Badalamenti and Di Cristina - begin to have problems with Totò, and their interaction becomes cold. At a successive meeting of the Commissione, Riina asks for their lives and is given permission to kill only Di Cristina, though he also kills Calderone.

At the end of the episode, Silvio Albertini, an honest colleague of Schirò, chances upon the hiding place of Riina, his wife and Provenzano. He immediately telephones Biagio from a phone box, and summons him to the location. As soon as he arrives, Schirò heads up to the apartment and finds Silvio's lifeless body on the floor. Suddenly, Riina's two soldati appear and beat Schirò. Riina emerges and warns his old friend to leave his family alone, especially Ninetta, before knocking him out cold.

=== Fourth episode (1979–1981) ===
Schirò and Boris Giuliano with his men go to the Punta Raisi airport in Palermo to arrest French chemists who have come to Sicily to teach Francesco Marino Mannoia (Bontade's chemist) to cut the drug, and on the other hand a meeting between the biggest mafia bosses. As soon as the police arrive at the airport, commissioner Giuliano receives a phone call in which he is told that it is not possible to stop the two Frenchmen for lack of evidence.

Peppe (who has an ill brother), Bontate's capodecina, accompanies Totò at home and receives the money to treat his brother in America.

Meanwhile, Totò and Ninetta have two children (Concetta and Giovanni) and they are waiting for the third one. Giuliano found the refinery of the Corleonesi, Schirò found the one of Bontade. Back to the police station Giuliano got a phone call telling him that he'll die soon.

At the airport is found a suitcase full of money, addressed to Bontade, who at this point calls his friends in Rome to complain that Giuliano is going too far and they must stop him, otherwise, he will.

Boris Giuliano sends his family on holiday promising to reach them the week after but a few days later he's killed by Leoluca Bagarella (Luchino) and Pino Greco (Scarpuzzedda). Meanwhile, Ninetta begins to feel pain, she's brought to the hospital but it's just a false alarm.

Someone in the city spits bad drugs. Totò Riina discovers who is responsible: it's a certain Tanino, right hand of Salvatore Inzerillo, to whom Tanino takes away the drug he resells. Totò manages to blackmail the bad dealer.

In the best clinic of Palermo Ninetta has given birth to her third son Giuseppe and meanwhile Teresa finds out she's pregnant. At Giuliano's funeral, Schirò (left watching it on TV) is unaware of the state of his wife and he has an argument with her, Teresa loses the child and decides to leave Sicily for Rome. After a while she's reached by her husband.

After a speech with Schirò, judge Gaetano Costa signs the arrest warrants for all the bosses of Palermo and he's subsequently killed by the Bontade family. Meanwhile, Cesare Terranova is sent to Palermo where he's killed by Totò. When the Palermo bosses come to know, they decide to eliminate 'u Curtu. Totò changed home (since the one where he lived was owned by Stefano Bontade): all the Palermitans are now against him.

With the help of Tanino and Peppe, Riina manages to escape all the attacks against him and Stefano Bontade, Salvatore Inzerillo and their families are killed by Mario Prestifilippo and "Scarpuzzedda". The Second Mafia War produces many deaths so John Gambino, the biggest American boss, arrives in Palermo to try to stop the murders. Riina assures and convinces him that the war is over and no other men of honor will be killed.

=== Fifth episode (1982-1987) ===
The fifth episode begins with Pio La Torre, regional secretary of the Italian Communist Party, which on one hand is a debate in Corleone to prevent the construction of a Cruise missiles base in Comiso and the other side with the full Commission. In the commission there is a certain Apuzzo, a capodecina, a dear friend of Tommaso Buscetta pretending to be loyal to Totò Riina.

The commissioner Mangano, now retired, advised the magistrates in Palermo (who want to fight the Mafia at all costs) Schirò as wildcard to find all the large and back to Corleone to tell Schirò to go to Palermo to work with Giovanni Falcone, Paolo Borsellino and Rocco Chinnici.

While Toto plays with her son Giovanni, Ninetta is pregnant again and is concerned for the ideas of her husband. Toto then decides to call a few of his soldiers and ordered the murder of Pio La Torre along his bodyguard Rosario Di Salvo.

Carlo Alberto Dalla Chiesa was sent to Palermo. The first action of General Dalla Chiesa is to send his men to search the collector of Ignazio Salvo, powerful man colluded with the Mafia. Shortly after General Dalla Chiesa was killed by "soldiers" of Riina and Nitto Santapaola. Also Rocco Chinnici is murdered.

Meanwhile, Apuzzo travels to Brazil for Tommaso Buscetta, but Toto becomes aware and kills Apuzzo and many of Buscetta's relatives. Tommasino was arrested for heroin trafficking. In the Brazilian prison he is tortured, but did not speak. He is transferred to Italy and, after an attempted suicide, started working with Giovanni Falcone. Tommasino explains the structure of Cosa Nostra, among other things. After questioning Buscetta, hundreds of people are arrested, Vito Ciancimino among them.

On July 28, 1985, the commissioner Giuseppe Montana, who was investigating victims of the Second Mafia War with Biagio, was assassinated. A young man, Salvatore Marino, is wrongly accused of the murder. Brought to the police station, Giacalone (police constable) is carried away by violence and kills the boy. Then, Ninni Cassarà informs Falcone, who opens an investigation. Meanwhile, Teresa and Antonio (wife and son of Schiro), who were in Rome, return to Palermo.

On August 6, 1985 Ninni Cassarà was killed by Giuseppe Greco "Scarpuzzedda", before the eyes of his wife and daughter. Meanwhile, in the high security jailhouse of Asinara, (in Sardinia), Falcone and Borsellino begin preparing for the Maxi Trial. At the end of the process, Riina and Provenzano were sentenced in absentia while Michele Greco, Luciano Liggio, and many others, present in the courtroom, are also sentenced to life imprisonment.

The episode ends with a shootout where we find on the one hand Schirò and on the other Vito Maranza and Leoluca Bagarella. The outcome of the shooting is a dead Vito Maranza and a seriously injured (Biagio Schirò).

=== Sixth episode (1988-1993) ===
Biagio Schirò is seriously injured due to the shooting with Leoluca Bagarella and Vito Maranza. He is taken to the hospital and fortunately he is saved, but remains lame in one leg. Totò Riina is nervous because he has been sentenced to life in prison. Ignazio Salvo reassures Toto by telling him that the sentence will be changed in the Court of Cassation. Totò orders Luchino and Giovanni Brusca to follow Ignazio Salvo.

For the title of head of the education office in Palermo there are two candidates: Giovanni Falcone and Antonino Meli. Falcone's appointment seems obvious but the role is instead entrusted to Meli. Riina orders the murder of Falcone to Pino Scarpuzzedda and Luchino. Pino organizes an attack on the judge's house at the sea in Addaura, near Mondello, but fails. In the following days Scarpuzzedda, now become quite powerful, with his swaggering air, performs two robberies in the area of the boss Pietro Aglieri, one in a jewelry store and the other at Banco di Sicilia. U Curtu had him strangled by his own colleagues (Antonino Madonia, Filippo Marchese, Antonino Marchese, Pino Marchese, Gaetano Carollo, Giuseppe Lucchese and Giuseppe Giacomo Gambino), with whom he carried out the bank robbery and the failed attack on Falcone.

Falcone is transferred to Rome. Ninuzzo Schirò decides to follow in his father's footsteps, also becoming a policeman. The revision of the Maxiprocesso sentence does not even take place in the Court of Cassation and Totò has Salvo Lima killed. A few days later Totò Riina and Giovanni Brusca meet to organize the attack on Falcone. The judge, who went to Palermo, is killed with the TNT at the crossroads of Capaci on 23 May 1992, together with his wife Francesca Morvillo and the escort. About two months later Paolo Borsellino is also killed, while the negotiation was underway between deviated pieces of the institutions and the Cosa Nostra which Paolo Borsellino would surely have firmly opposed. Some soldiers of Totò, on his order, kill Ignazio Salvo. Meanwhile, Vito Ciancimino is contacted by the captain of the carabinieri Li Donni in an attempt to deal with the Corleonesi to end the massacres. Totò Riina decides to negotiate with the state and prepares a "papello" with all his requests.

Binnu does not agree with the "war on institutions" that is leading Totò and for this reason he has a bitter discussion with him while they are having lunch with Ninetta and Luchino. One evening, while traveling in his car, Baldassare Di Maggio (Balduccio) is stopped and taken to prison. He too decides to become a collaborator of justice and has Totò arrested, revealing his hiding place in via Bernini, in Palermo.

After the arrest of her husband, Ninetta and her children (Concetta, Giovanni, Giuseppe and Lucia) return to Corleone. At the home of Totò, Luchino, Binnu and Giovanni Brusca take all the documents that could still be compromising. The episode ends with a clarifying dialogue between Biagio and Totò.

== Audience ==
| Episode | Broadcast date | Viewers (millions) | Share |
|---|---|---|---|
| 1 | October 25, 2007 | 7.146 | 27.21% |
| 2 | November 1, 2007 | 7.810 | 30.40% |
| 3 | November 8, 2007 | 7.545 | 28.10% |
| 4 | November 15, 2007 | 6.985 | 28.15% |
| 5 | November 22, 2007 | 7.731 | 29.98% |
| 6 | November 29, 2007 | 7.995 | 28.59% |
