= Bagarella =

Bagarella is an Italian surname. Notable people with the surname include:

- Calogero Bagarella (1935–1969), Italian mobster, brother of Leoluca
- Leoluca Bagarella (born 1942), Italian mobster, brother of Calogero
