= Pietro Scaglione =

Italian judge (1906–1971)

Pietro Scaglione

Pietro Scaglione (Italian pronunciation: [ˈpjɛːtro skaʎˈʎoːne]; Lercara Friddi, March 2, 1906 – Palermo, May 5, 1971) was an Italian magistrate and Chief Prosecutor of Palermo, Sicily. He was killed by the Mafia in 1971.

== Fighting the Mafia ==
Scaglione graduated in law at the University of Palermo in 1927. After a career in the judiciary, he became Chief Prosecutor of Palermo in April 1962. As such, together with the head of the investigative branch of the prosecution office Cesare Terranova, he was responsible for the repression of the Mafia after the First Mafia war and the Ciaculli massacre on June 30, 1963. Their efforts were largely undone by lenient sentences of the court in Catanzaro at the so-called Trial of the 114.

== Death ==
On May 5, 1971, Scaglione was killed with his driver Antonino Lo Russo, when he returned from his daily visit to the tomb of his wife at the Cappuccini cemetery in Palermo. It was the first time since the end of World War II that the Mafia had murdered an Italian magistrate. The police rounded up 114 Mafiosi who would be tried in the second Trial of the 114.

== Murder still unsolved ==
Police at the location where Scaglione and Lo Russo were murdered

No one has ever been convicted for the killing of Scaglione and his driver. In January 1991, the suspects Gaetano Fidanzati, Pietro D’Accardio, Gerlando Alberti and his son, Francesco Russo, Salvatore Riina, Luciano Leggio and Giuseppe Calò were not brought before the court by the prosecution for lack of sufficient proof.

During his long career in the judiciary Scaglione was involved in some of the unsolved political mysteries that tainted post-war Italy. He was the last one to have interrogated Gaspare Pisciotta, the right-hand man of the Sicilian bandit Salvatore Giuliano, held responsible for the Portella della Ginestra massacre on May Day 1947 to impede the advance of communist and peasant movement.

He was also the last one to have seen the journalist Mauro De Mauro, who disappeared in September 1970 following his investigations on the mysterious death of Enrico Mattei and on the Golpe Borghese, a right wing coup attempt. De Mauro was allegedly murdered by the Mafia to cover up these events and possible political connections. Some observers claim Scaglione had been involved to keep these mysteries under wraps. Recent historical research, however, describes Scaglione as an honest judge.

== Mafia involvement ==
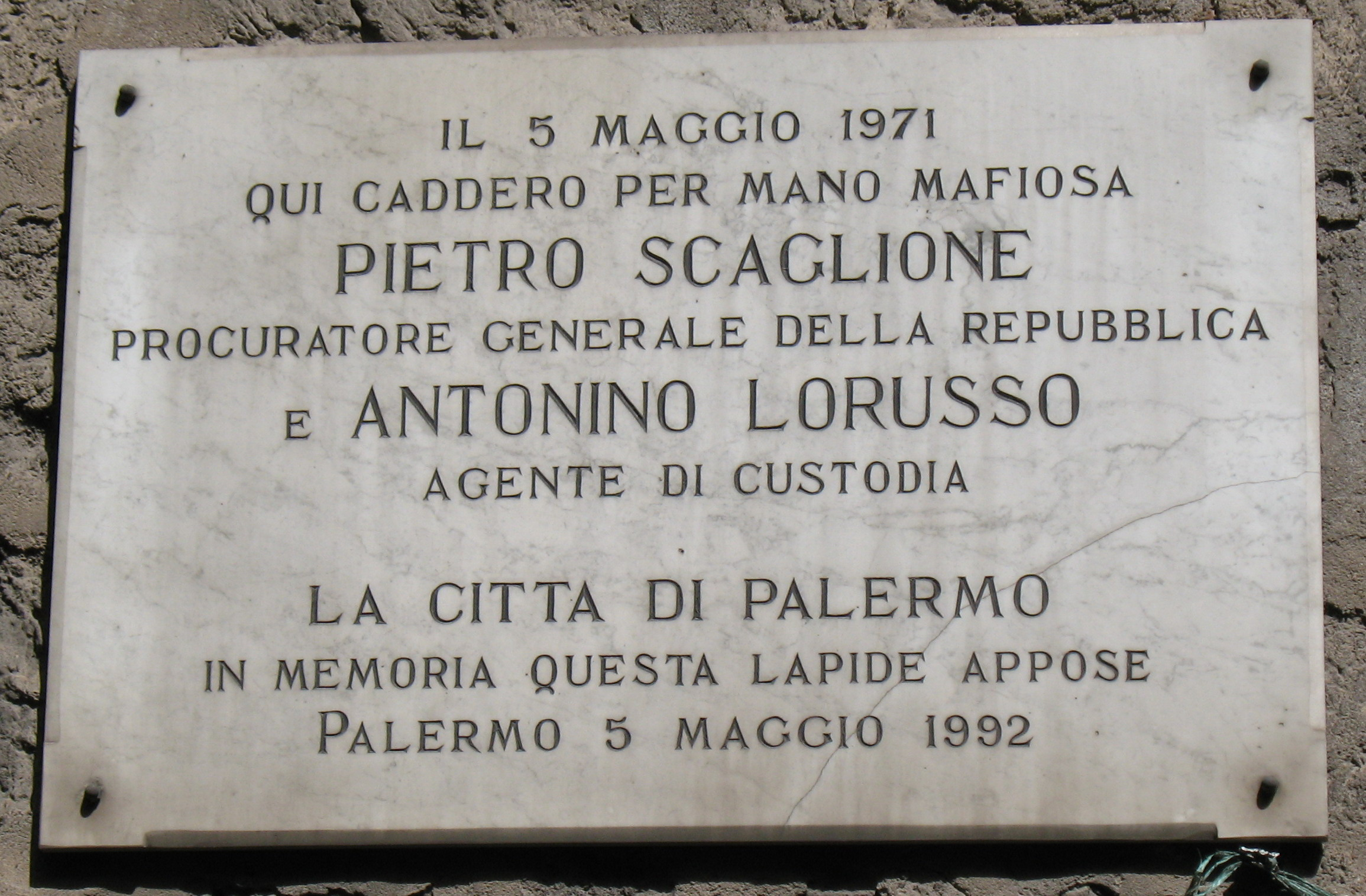
Memorial stone

According to Mafia turncoat (pentito) Tommaso Buscetta the murder of Scaglione had three objectives: to remove a troublesome prosecutor, to bring heat on two rival Mafiosi who were being tried by Scaglione and who might be thought culpable, and to create the suspicion that Scaglione had collaborated with the Mafia. Another pentito, Antonino Calderone, suggested that Scaglione's assassination was the Mafia's way of asserting its return to potency after the Catanzaro trial, during which it had been quiet.

It is now generally assumed that the killing was ordered by Mafia boss Luciano Leggio, head of the Corleonesi, because Scaglione had sent one of Leggio's sisters into internal banishment from Corleone for aiding and abetting her brother who was a fugitive at the time. According to Buscetta it was Leggio himself who killed Scaglione with the help of Salvatore Riina. Leggio would later be tried twice for killing Scaglione but was acquitted for insufficient evidence.

== See also ==
- List of victims of the Sicilian Mafia
- Il Capo dei Capi
