= Mario Francese =

Italian crime reporter

- Born: 6 February 1925; Siracusa, Italy
- Died: 26 January 1979 (aged 53); Palermo, Italy
- Cause of death: Killed by the Sicilian Mafia
- Occupation: Journalist
- Known for: Investigative journalism

Mario Francese (Italian pronunciation: [ˈmaːrjo franˈtʃeːze]; 6 February 1925 – 26 January 1979) was an Italian crime reporter of the Giornale di Sicilia. He was the first journalist to expose the role of Toto Riina and the Corleonesi within the Sicilian Mafia, and because of this he was killed on 26 January 1979. After 22 years, in 2001, those who had decided to eliminate him were convicted.

== Early years ==
Born in Syracuse, Sicily, he moved to Palermo to finish school. In the 1950s Francese got his first job as a journalist at the Agenzia Nazionale Stampa Associata (ANSA). Shortly afterwards, he was hired by the newspaper La Sicilia in Catania as a crime and judicial affairs correspondent. As he was looking to improve his financial situation, in 1957 he accepted a job as head of the press office at the regional administration of Sicily.

Thanks to his improved financial situation, he decided to marry Maria Sagona in 1958. Soon, however, he resigned from his second job at ANSA and started to collaborate with the Giornale di Sicilia, the main newspaper of Palermo. He was appointed to cover crime and judicial affairs and became one of the best experts on the Mafia. After some time, however, he was forced to make a choice between his job at the Sicilian regional administration and the one at the Giornale di Sicilia. In 1968, he chose to become a professional journalist.

== Crime reporter in Palermo ==
At the Giornale di Sicilia he began to do all crime reporting, from the Ciaculli massacre, to the murder of Carabinieri Colonel Giuseppe Russo. By digging in the intrigues connected with the construction of the Garcia dam, he also was the first to understand the strategic evolution and the new interests of the Mafia of Corleone and their spread to Palermo. Francese looked into the connections of the Corleonesi, businessmen and politicians in relation with public contracts. He was the only journalist to interview Ninetta Bagarella, the wife of Salvatore Riina.

In his motivation of the sentence of his killers in 2001, 22 years later, the judge described Francese's skills: "An extraordinary capacity to make connections between the most significant news events, interpret them with courageous intelligence, and thus to draw a reconstruction of exceptional clarity and credibility on the evolutionary lines of Cosa Nostra, in a historical phase in which – in addition to the emergence of insightful and widespread mafia infiltration in the world of procurement and economics – Cosa Nostra's strategy of attacking the State institutions began to take shape. A subversive strategy that had made a quality leap just with the elimination of one of the most lucid minds of Sicilian journalism, a professional stranger to any form of packaging, free of any complacency towards the cliques colluded with the Mafia and able to provide the public with important tools for the analysis of the changes taking place within Cosa Nostra."

== Murder and trial ==
He was shot five times and killed on the evening of 26 January 1979, in front of his house in Palermo, by Leoluca Bagarella, the brother-in-law of Riina. The murder of Francese was recorded as a crime of passion; soon forgotten and the investigation closed.

The investigation on the murder was reopened years later, at the insistence of the family, particularly of his son, Giuseppe Francese. The sentence of the first instance came in 2001, condemning the whole leading Commission of the Cosa Nostra. Riina, Francesco Madonia, Nenè Geraci, Giuseppe Farinella, Michele Greco, Leoluca Bagarella (the actual killer) and Giuseppe Calò were sentenced to 30 years. Bernardo Provenzano was sentenced to life imprisonment.

The sentences were confirmed in appeal. In December 2003, the Italian Supreme Court absolved Pippo Calò, Nenè Geraci and Giuseppe Farinella "for not having committed the crime" and confirmed the sentence of 30 years of prison for Totò Riina, Leoluca Bagarella, Raffaele Ganci, Francesco Madonia and Michele Greco. The conviction of Bernardo Provenzano was also confirmed.

Giuseppe, the son of Mario Francese and like him a journalist at the Giornale di Sicilia, after having fought so much for the truth about the murder of his father, committed suicide shortly before the sentencing of the murderers by the Appeal Court.

== Awards ==
In 1996 the Mario Francese Award was created to honor his memory. In 2001, Francesca Barra honored the memory of the two journalists (Mario Francese and his son Giuseppe) by publishing a book, The Fourth Commandment (with publisher Rizzoli).

A square in Corleone, was named after Mario and Giuseppe Francese. The National Union of Italian Reporters commemorated the journalist with the inauguration of a green area named after him in Viale Campania, an important avenue in Palermo, in the presence of family members.

== In popular culture ==
Mario Francese's life was the basis of an episode of the 2018 Italian TV series Liberi sognatori.

== See also ==
- List of victims of the Sicilian Mafia
- List of journalists killed in Europe

== Bibliography ==
- Follain, John (2009). The Last Godfathers: Inside the Mafia's Most Infamous Family, New York: Thomas Dunne Books
- Longrigg, Clare (2008). Boss of Bosses, London: John Murray Publishers, ISBN 978-1-84854-245-7
- Siebert, Renate (1996). Secrets of Life and Death: Women and the Mafia, London: Verso, ISBN 1-85984-023-X
