= Boris Giuliano =

Italian police officer

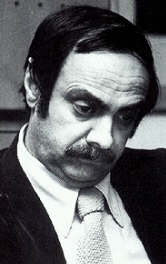
- Police inspector Boris Giuliano
- Born: 22 October 1930; Piazza Armerina, Enna, Sicily, Italy
- Died: 21 July 1979 (aged 48); Palermo, Italy
- Cause of death: Killed by the Sicilian Mafia
- Occupation: Police inspector
- Known for: Police investigations into the Mafia

Giorgio Boris Giuliano (Italian pronunciation: [ˈdʒordʒo ˈbɔːriz dʒuˈljaːno]; 22 October 1930 – 21 July 1979) was a police chief from Palermo, Sicily. He was the head of Palermo's Flying Squad. He was killed by the Sicilian Mafia while investigating heroin trafficking and money laundering. Not long before his death he had been one of the first Italian policemen to have attended the FBI academy at Quantico, Virginia. His son Alessandro became head of the Milan Flying Squad and arrested old guard Mafioso Gaetano Fidanzati in 2009; as part of the same operation, Gianni Nicchi was captured in Palermo.

== Early years ==
Before becoming a police officer, Giuliano had many other professions: as a dishwasher in London, where he learned English, while studying at the university in Messina; as a seller of neckties in Milan; as the manager in a factory in Lombardy. As a boy he had lived in the Italian colonies of Africa, where his father served as an officer of the Italian Navy. In 1963, after joining the police, Giuliano was assigned, at his request, to the Flying Squad of Palermo. These were the years of the so-called First Mafia War between the Grecos and the brothers Salvatore and Angelo La Barbera.

In 1973 he became deputy police chief under Bruno Contrada, who had created the section investigating the Mafia. They were dubbed 'B&B', Bruno and Boris. Together, they radically changed investigating methods: two meetings per day with all the officials to take stock of the ongoing investigations and share information. (Contrada was later arrested and convicted for aiding and abetting the Mafia).

Giuliano was involved in the investigation in the disappearance of journalist Mauro De Mauro in September 1970. He focused on the lead of De Mauro's investigations into the death of ENI president Enrico Mattei, prompted by the disappearance a few pages of notes and a tape with the last speech given by Mattei from De Mauro's office. The investigations were seriously hampered due to deviations by people within the Italian police forces and secret services. According to Giuliano there was "someone at the ministry in Rome that does not want to go to the bottom of the death of De Mauro." An order to scale down the investigation was issued by the head of the secret service, Vito Miceli, allegedly involved in the neo-fascist Borghese coup.

== Pizza Connection ==
In 1976 he became the head of Palermo's Flying Squad. During the late 1970s he was investigating drug trafficking by various members of the Sicilian Mafia including the boss Stefano Bontade, as well as a series of armed robberies linked to Corso dei Mille boss Filippo Marchese. Bontade was closely linked to the Spatola-Inzerillo-Gambino network involved in heroin trafficking since the mid-1970s until the mid-1980s when US and Italian law enforcement were able to significantly reduce the heroin supply of the Sicilian Mafia (the so-called Pizza Connection). The Bontade-Spatola-Inzerillo traffickers supplied the Gambino Family – through John Gambino – in New York City with heroin that was refined in laboratories on the island from Turkish morphine base. The investigation started when Giuliano found a suitcase at Palermo's Punta Raisi Airport with half a million dollars neatly wrapped in freshly laundered pizza aprons.

According to Giovanni Falcone, the investigating magistrate, the group had made about US$600 million. The proceeds were re-invested in real estate through the banker Michele Sindona. Giuliano discovered cheques and other documents which indicated that Sindona through the Vatican Bank had been recycling the proceeds from heroin sales by the Mafia to his Amincor Bank in Switzerland. He coordinated his investigations with the lawyer Giorgio Ambrosoli, appointed as liquidator of Sindona's banks, that had been declared insolvent due to mismanagement and fraud, involving losses in foreign currency speculation and poor loan policies. Ambrosoli was murdered on 11 July 1979 in Milan.

== Killed by the Mafia ==
Ten days later, on 21 July 1979, Giuliano was shot dead in the Lux Bar in Palermo taking a cappuccino while waiting for his car to take him to work early in the morning. The material killer was future Corleonesi boss Leoluca Bagarella. Bagarella shot Giuliano in the neck with a 7.65 handgun, three times and, standing over the body, fired four bullets into Giuliano's back before making his escape in a getaway car.

Giuliano was investigating Bagarella after he had discovered his hiding place. Bagarella had managed to escape in time, but inside Giuliano discovered weapons, four kilogrammes of heroin and false documents with photographs depicting Bagarella. Bagarella, who had been arrested on 24 June 1995, received a life sentence for the killing. The murder was sanctioned by the Sicilian Mafia Commission; its members Salvatore Riina, Bernardo Provenzano, Michele Greco, Francesco Madonia, Giuseppe Calò, Bernardo Brusca, Nenè Geraci and Francesco Spadaro also received a life sentence.

== In popular culture ==
A miniseries was made in 2016 called Boris Giuliano - Un poliziotto a Palermo directed by Ricky Tognazzi where Giuliano is played by Adriano Giannini.

The Giuliano murder was also represented in Pif's 2016 series The Mafia Kills Only in Summer.

== See also ==
- List of victims of the Sicilian Mafia
- Il Capo dei Capi
