= Bernardo Provenzano =

Italian crime boss and member of the Sicilian Mafia

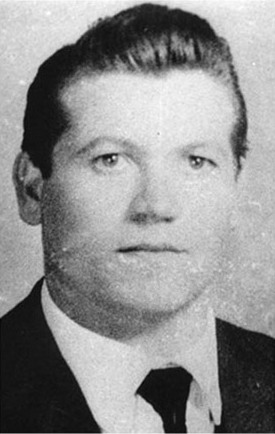
- Provenzano in 1959
- Born: 31 January 1933; Corleone, Sicily, Kingdom of Italy
- Died: 13 July 2016 (aged 83); Milan, Italy
- Other names: "Binnu u tratturi" (Bernie the tractor) "Zio Binnu" (Uncle Bernie) "Il ragioniere" (The accountant)
- Occupation: Mafia boss
- Children: 2
- Status: Deceased (imprisoned from 2006)
- Allegiance: Corleone Mafia family Corleonesi
- Convictions: Mafia association multiple murder
- Criminal charges: Mafia association multiple murders
- Penalty: 20 terms of life imprisonment

Bernardo Provenzano (Italian pronunciation: [berˈnardo provenˈtsaːno]; 31 January 1933 – 13 July 2016) was an Italian mobster, capo of the Corleone Mafia family, and of the Corleonesi, an alliance of Mafia families that originated in the town of Corleone, and de facto the boss of bosses ("il capo dei capi"). His nickname was Binnu u tratturi (Sicilian for "Bernie the tractor") because, in the words of one informant, "he mows people down". Another nickname was il ragioniere ("the accountant"), due to his apparently subtle and low-key approach to running his crime empire, at least in contrast to some of his more violent predecessors.

Provenzano was part of the Corleonesi Mafia clan who backed mob boss Luciano Leggio in the ambush and murder of Michele Navarra in the late 1950s. In 1963, Provenzano became a fugitive after a failed hit. Provenzano also participated in the Viale Lazio massacre in the late 1960s. Salvatore Riina succeeded Leggio in the mid-1970s, and Provenzano became the second-in-command of the Corleonesi. Provenzano took the reins after Riina and Bagarella's arrests, but the three had already been sentenced to life in absentia in the late 1980s as part of the Maxi Trial and in the 1990s for the two high-profile bombings (the Capaci massacre and Via D'Amelio massacre) that killed prosecutors Giovanni Falcone and Paolo Borsellino. After 43 years living as a fugitive, he was captured in 2006 and subjected to the stringent Article 41-bis prison regime until his death on 13 July 2016.

== Early years ==
Provenzano was born the third of seven children on 31 January 1933, in Corleone, Sicily, to farmers Angelo Provenzano and Giovanna Rigoglioso. It was during this period that a series of illegal activities began, especially cattle raiding and the theft of foodstuffs. In August 1958, Provenzano was one of the 14 gunmen who backed mob boss Luciano Leggio in the ambush and murder of Michele Navarra. Leggio subsequently became the head of the Family. Over the next five years, Provenzano helped Leggio hunt down and kill many of Navarra's surviving supporters. In September 1963, Provenzano became a fugitive after the failed killing of one of Navarra's men – at this point, he was not running from the police but from a Mafia vendetta. Leggio said of Provenzano: "He shoots like an angel but has the brains of a chicken". On 10 September 1963, an arrest warrant was issued against Provenzano for the murder of one of Navarra's men.

Provenzano participated in the Viale Lazio massacre on 10 December 1969: the killing of Michele Cavataio for his role in the First Mafia War. The attack nearly went wrong, as Cavataio was able to shoot to death Calogero Bagarella before Provenzano killed him with a Beretta 38/A submachine gun and earned himself a reputation as a Mafia killer with the attack. However, according to Gaetano Grado, one of the participants who turned government witness later, it was Provenzano who botched the attack, shooting too early.

Leggio was captured by police in 1974, and Salvatore Riina was effectively left in charge. Provenzano became the second-in-command of the Corleonesi, Riina's right-hand man.

== Fugitive and later years ==
In 1981, Provenzano and Riina unleashed the so-called Second Mafia War, with which they eliminated rival bosses and established a new "Commission", composed only of capomandamenti; during the meetings of the "Commission", Provenzano participated in the decisions and the organization of numerous murders as an influential exponent of the district of Corleone and repeatedly protected, with intimidation, the political career of Vito Ciancimino, the main political referent of the Corleonesi.

In 1993, after Riina's arrest, in a meeting at Villabate, it was decided that both Bernardo Provenzano and Leoluca Bagarella would take charge of holding Corleone's mandate together. But Bagarella and Provenzano had rifts because Bagarella wanted to continue with the slaughter strategy while Provenzano wanted to stop the slaughters. After Bagarella's arrest in 1995, Provenzano took the reins of the Corleonesi and all of Cosa Nostra; however, he had already been sentenced to life in absentia in 1987 at the Maxi Trial.

In 1997 and 1999 respectively, Provenzano was given life sentences for the 1992 murders of anti-mafia magistrates Falcone and Borsellino.

== Evasion and capture ==
Comparison between the last photofit, performed in 2005, and a photo taken after his capture in 2006

Provenzano frowned upon the use of telephones, and issued orders and communications (even to his family) through small, hand-delivered notes called pizzini. Many of the notes from Provenzano that police have intercepted sign off with religious blessings, such as one that concluded "May the Lord bless and protect you". According to mob godmother-turned-informant Giuseppina Vitale, Provenzano had appeared at a 1992 Cosa Nostra summit meeting dressed in the purple robes of a Catholic bishop. Religious behaviour and language progressively became the prominent features of Provenzano's figure. For example, Provenzano systematically underlined verses from the Bible and took notes of relevant passages to be threaded in his pizzini through otherwise routine instructions regarding daily business matters. He also recurrently thanked 'Our Lord Jesus Christ', and referred to 'The Divine Providence' and 'Our beloved Lord', expressing the hope that 'He might help us to do the right things'. In particular, the expression Con il volere di Dio (With God's will) has, to date, been counted 43 times, and it often appears more than once in the same piece of communication.

Provenzano used a version of the Caesar cypher, used by Julius Caesar in wartime communications. The Caesar code involves shifting each letter of the alphabet forward three places; Provenzano's pizzini code did the same, then replaced letters with numbers indicating their position in the alphabet. For example, one reported note by Provenzano read "I met 512151522 191212154 and we agreed that we will see each other after the holidays...". This name was decoded as "Binnu Riina".

In October 2003, Provenzano was driven to France, allegedly by Villabate mobster Salvatore Troia, to undergo prostate surgery at a private clinic near Marseille. Provenzano was also provided with fake travel and medical records, under the name of Salvatore Troia's father, Gaspare Troia, a Sicilian baker. Mario Cusimano, another Villabate mobster who was later arrested, began to collaborate with police in 2005, and revealed to the investigators that the identity card used by Provenzano to go to Marseille had been stamped by Francesco Campanella, former president of the municipal council of Villabate, and in September 2005, Campanella also began to collaborate with police who confirmed that he was the one who had stamped the document. The Italian State Police were able to create a photofit of Provenzano based on the descriptions of informants, as well as doctors and nurses at the Marseilles clinic where Provenzano was admitted for surgery.

On 25 January 2005, police raided various homes in Sicily and arrested 46 Mafia suspects believed to be helping Provenzano elude the authorities. Although they did not catch the elusive Mafia boss himself, investigators nonetheless unearthed evidence that the 72-year-old Provenzano was still very much alive and in control of the Mafia, in the form of his cryptic handwritten notes, his preferred method of giving orders to his men. Two months later, another raid took place. It resulted in the capture of over 80 Mafiosi, though Provenzano was not one of them.

Provenzano had been a fugitive from the law since 1963. Until his arrest, the only known photographs of him were taken during the 1950s; the last known photo was taken in 1959: a serious youth with greased hair wearing a suit for a saint's festival. Provenzano was finally captured on 11 April 2006, by the Italian police near his home town, Corleone. A spokesman for the Palermo police, Agent Daniele Macaluso, said Provenzano had been arrested during the morning near Corleone, 60 km south of Palermo and was being driven back to the Sicilian capital. The police were able to pinpoint Provenzano's exact location by the simplest of connections; they tracked a delivery of clean laundry from his family to his farmhouse hide-out.

== After his arrest ==
After his arrest, he was held at the maximum security prison in Terni, and subjected to the Article 41-bis prison regime. After one year, he was transferred to a prison in Novara where he tried several times to communicate through pizzini. The Ministry of Justice then decided to apply "special surveillance" on Provenzano.

In total, Provenzano was given 20 life sentences plus 49 years and one month, and solitary confinement for 33 years and six months.

After the arrest of Provenzano, Salvatore Lo Piccolo and Matteo Messina Denaro were thought to be the new leaders of Cosa Nostra. However, about 350 pizzini were found at Provenzano's hide-out, some of which had indicated that Provenzano's joint deputies in Palermo were Salvatore Lo Piccolo and Antonio Rotolo, capomandamento of Pagliarelli, a Corleonesi loyalist in the days of Totò Riina. In a message referring to an important decision for Cosa Nostra, Provenzano told Rotolo: "It's up to you, me and Lo Piccolo to decide this thing."

Anti-Mafia prosecutor Antonio Ingroia of the Direzione distrettuale antimafia (DDA) of Palermo said that it was unlikely that there would be an all-out war over who would fill Provenzano's shoes. "Right now I don't think that's probable," he said. Of the two possible successors, Ingroia thought Lo Piccolo was the more likely heir to the Mafia throne. "He's from Palermo, and that's still the most powerful Mafia stronghold", Ingroia said.

Two months after Provenzano's arrest, on 20 June 2006, authorities issued 52 arrest warrants against the top echelon of Cosa Nostra in the city of Palermo (Operation Gotha). In November 2009, Massimo Ciancimino, the son of a former mayor of Palermo Vito Ciancimino, said that Provenzano had betrayed the whereabouts of Riina. Police sent Vito Ciancimino maps of Palermo. One of the maps was delivered to Provenzano, then a Mafia fugitive. Ciancimino said the map was returned by Provenzano who indicated the precise location of Riina's hiding place.

On 19 March 2011, it was confirmed that Provenzano was suffering from bladder cancer, and he was transferred from Novara to a prison in Parma; on 9 May 2012, he attempted suicide by putting his head in a plastic bag, with the aim of suffocation, but was foiled when it was observed by a prison police officer.

On 9 April 2014, he was admitted into the San Paolo Hospital in Milan.

== List of trials ==
- In 1987, in the Maxi Trial, Provenzano was sentenced in absentia to life imprisonment together with Salvatore Riina and 17 other mob bosses.
- In 1995, in the trial for the murder of Lieutenant Colonel Giuseppe Russo, Provenzano was sentenced in absentia to life imprisonment together with Salvatore Riina, Michele Greco and Leoluca Bagarella.
- The same year, in the trial for the murders of the commissioners Beppe Montana and Antonino Cassarà, he was also sentenced in absentia to life imprisonment together with Michele Greco, Bernardo Brusca, Francesco Madonia and Salvatore Riina.
- The same year, in the trial for the murders of Piersanti Mattarella, Pio La Torre, Rosario di Salvo and Michele Reina, in which he was given a further life sentence in absentia together with Michele Greco, Bernardo Brusca, Salvatore Riina, Giuseppe Calò, Francesco Madonia and Nenè Geraci.
- The same year, in the trial for the murder of General Carlo Alberto dalla Chiesa, Boris Giuliano, and Paolo Giaccone, Provenzano was sentenced to life imprisonment in absentia together with Salvatore Riina, Giuseppe Calò, Bernardo Brusca, Francesco Madonia, Nenè Geraci and Francesco Spadaro.
- In 1997, in the trial for the Capaci massacre in which the judge Giovanni Falcone, his wife Francesca Morvillo and their escort of Antonio Montinaro, Vito Schifani and Rocco Di Cillo, lost their lives, Provenzano was sentenced to life imprisonment in absentia together with the bosses Salvatore Riina, Pietro Aglieri, Bernardo Brusca, Giuseppe Calò, Raffaele Ganci, Nenè Geraci, Benedetto Spera, Nitto Santapaola, Salvatore Montalto, Giuseppe Graviano, Matteo Motisi.
- The same year, in the trial for the murder of Judge Cesare Terranova, Provenzano received another life sentence in absentia along with Michele Greco, Bernardo Brusca, Giuseppe Calò, Nenè Geraci, Francesco Madonia and Salvatore Riina.
- In 1999, Provenzano was sentenced to life imprisonment in absentia in the trial against those responsible for the Via D'Amelio massacre, in which the judge Paolo Borsellino and five of his escort men lost their lives; together with him the bosses Giuseppe "Piddu" Madonia, Nitto Santapaola, Giuseppe Calò, Giuseppe Farinella, Raffaele Ganci, Nino Giuffrè, Filippo Graviano, Michelangelo La Barbera, Giuseppe Montalto, Salvatore Montalto, Matteo Motisi, Salvatore Biondo, Cristoforo Cannella, Domenico Ganci and Stefano Ganci.
- In 2000, he was sentenced in absentia to life imprisonment together with Giuseppe Graviano, Leoluca Bagarella and Salvatore Riina for the 1993 bombings including Via dei Georgofili, in Florence, Milan and Rome.
- In 2002, Provenzano was sentenced in absentia to life imprisonment for the murder of judge Rocco Chinnici together with the bosses Salvatore Riina, Raffaele Ganci, Antonino Madonia, Salvatore Buscemi, Nenè Geraci, Giuseppe Calò, Francesco Madonia, Salvatore and Giuseppe Montalto, Stefano Ganci and Vincenzo Galatolo.
- In 2003, Provenzano was sentenced in absentia to life imprisonment for the murder of Mario Francese.
- In 2009, he received another life sentence together with Salvatore Riina for the Viale Lazio massacre and the death of Michele Cavataio.

== Family ==
Provenzano had been romantically linked to Saveria Benedetta Palazzolo, a woman from a Mafia family from Cinisi; the couple had two children, Angelo Provenzano and Francesco Paolo Provenzano. Palazzolo and her children lived in hiding until 1992; then, in the spring of that year, they suddenly returned to Corleone.

Angelo had been a tour guide in Palermo, speaking about Sicilian Mafia history. Francesco Paolo graduated in 2005 with a doctorate in Modern Languages and Cultures at the University of Palermo.

== Death ==
On 13 July 2016, Provenzano died aged 83 at San Paolo Hospital in Milan from complications from bladder cancer. Refused a public funeral by the church and the Palermo police chief, Provenzano was cremated in Milan, and on 18 July his ashes were buried in his family tomb in a cemetery in his hometown of Corleone.

== In popular culture ==
- Il fantasma di Corleone, a 2006 film by Marco Amenta;
- L'ultimo dei Corleonesi, a 2007 film by Alberto Negrin where Provenzano is played by David Coco;
- Scacco al re - La cattura di Provenzano, a 2007 documentary series;
- Il Capo dei Capi, a 2007 TV series by Enzo Monteleone and Alexis Sweet, where Provenzano is played by Salvatore Lazzaro;
- L'ultimo padrino, a 2008 two-part television miniseries by Marco Risi, where Provenzano is played by Michele Placido.
- Il cacciatore (Cacciatore: The Hunter in English) is an Italian television series (2018– ) based on the autobiographical book Cacciatore di mafiosi by magistrate Alfonso Sabella, in which Provenzano is one of the main Mafia targets.
