= Rosario Naimo =

Member of the Sicilian Mafia

Rosario Naimo (born August 18, 1945 in Palermo) is a member of the Sicilian Mafia, also known as Saro or Saruzzo. He was seen as an important go-between for the Sicilian and American Mafia, closely related with the Gambino crime family. He is a man of honour from the Tommaso Natale-Cardillo Mafia family that later became part of San Lorenzo family.

== Mafia member ==
He became a member of the Mafia in Sicily in 1965 and immigrated to Detroit in the United States in 1968. According to a 2006 report of the New Jersey State Commission of Investigation, Naimo was the head of the Sicilian Mafia in the United States at the time. He succeeded Francesco Gambino, convicted for his role in running the "Iron Tower" conspiracy – a drug trafficking and money laundering operation. He was a man so powerful that the Sicilian Mafia boss of bosses Salvatore Riina said of him that he was "more powerful than the President of the United States".

== Guaranteeing Mafia peace ==
Naimo is related to the expulsion of the Inzerillo clan by the Corleonesi after the Second Mafia War in the years 1981-1983. Riina had the Sicilian Mafia Commission to adopt a ruling that allowed the surviving Inzerillos to take refuge in the U.S., with the agreement that none of them, or their offspring, could ever return to Sicily. Many went to the New York area and joined forces with their relatives in the Gambino crime family. They were dubbed "gli scappati" (the escapees). However, after the arrest of Totò Riina (1993) and other hard-line Corleonesi like Leoluca Bagarella (1995), the Inzerillos started to come back to Sicily. At the time, Naimo had been appointed to guarantee the agreement.

== Cocaine trafficking ==
At the end of the 1980s he had been involved with cocaine trafficking. His name was mentioned in relation to the seizure 600 kilograms of cocaine on the vessel "Big John" of the coast Castellamare del Golfo in Eastern Sicily in January 1988. A pact between Sicilian mafiosi and Colombian traffickers of the Medellin cartel stipulated that this should be the first of a series of even larger shipments, with Cosa Nostra aiming for the monopoly of cocaine distribution in Western Europe.

At the time the cooperation between the two criminal organisations was seen as serious threat. In May 1992, just ten days before the Mafia murdered him, judge Giovanni Falcone referred to this case during a conference on drug trafficking, warning of the consequences of “joint ventures in illicit activity at international level.” In his words, the Colombian-Sicilian deal provided “the proof of the beginning of direct contacts [which are] extremely dangerous for the possible risk of operational fusion between criminal organizations of considerable economic power and great operational capacity.”

== Fugitive and arrest ==
Naimo has been a fugitive since and was arrested in Palermo, Sicily on October 27, 2010. He was 65 years old at the time of capture. After his arrest he started to collaborate with the Prosecutors Office in Palermo, Sicily. One of the many things he revealed was where and how the journalist Mauro De Mauro was killed in September 1970. The killing of De Mauro is one of the unsolved mysteries in Italy.
