= Viale Lazio massacre =

1969 Mafia killing in Palermo, Sicily

- The body of Michele Cavataio after the hit in Viale Lazio.
- Location: Office in the Viale Lazio in Palermo, Sicily
- Date: 10 December 1969; 7:30 p.m. (Central European Time)
- Target: Michele Cavataio, Mafia boss of the Acquasanta quarter of Palermo.
- Attack type: Massacre
- Deaths: Five killed
- Perpetrators: Mafia hit squad composed of Bernardo Provenzano, Calogero Bagarella, Emanuele D’Agostino, Damiano Caruso (mafioso), Gaetano Grado and Salvatore Riina.

The Viale Lazio massacre on 10 December 1969 was a settling of accounts in the Sicilian Mafia. Mafia boss Michele Cavataio and three men were killed on Viale Lazio in Palermo, Sicily, by a Mafia hit squad. The bloodbath marked the end of a pax mafiosa that had reigned since the Ciaculli massacre until the end of the Trial of the 114 against Cosa Nostra.

== Preceding events ==
Cavataio had been one of the protagonists of the First Mafia War in 1962-63. According to pentito (government witness) Tommaso Buscetta it had been Cavataio who deliberately escalated a dispute between different factions. He was held responsible for the Ciaculli massacre, a bomb attack against Salvatore "Ciaschiteddu" Greco. He kept fuelling the war through other bomb attacks and killings. Another pentito, Gaetano Grado, confirmed Buscetta’s testimony.

After the Trial of the 114 relating to the First Mafia War, was over in December 1968, several top Mafia bosses decided to eliminate Cavataio during a meeting in Zürich on the instigation of Salvatore "Ciaschiteddu" Greco who had come all the way from Venezuela. Greco had come to subscribe to Buscetta’s theory about how the First Mafia War began. Cavataio claimed to have drawn a map of the Palermo Mafia families including the names of all members in an attempt to blackmail his way out of trouble. Such a map would be dangerous if the police were to get hold of it.

A Mafia hit squad was composed including Bernardo Provenzano, Calogero Bagarella (an elder brother of Leoluca Bagarella the brother-in-law of Totò Riina), Emanuele D’Agostino and Gaetano Grado of Stefano Bontade’s Santa Maria di Gesù Family, and Damiano Caruso (mafioso), a soldier of Giuseppe Di Cristina, the Mafia boss of Riesi.

According to Buscetta and Grado, the composition of the hit squad was a clear indication that the killing had been sanctioned collectively by all the major Sicilian Mafia families: not only did it include Calogero Bagarella from Corleone, and members of Stefano Bontate’s family in Palermo, but also a soldier of Giuseppe Di Cristina’s family on the other end of Sicily in Riesi.

== The attack ==
At 7:30 p.m., the hit squad dressed in police uniforms carrying 12-gauge shotguns, submachine guns and pistols, entered the office of the Girolamo Moncada construction company on Viale Lazio – a modern street in the smart new northern area of Palermo. Totò Riina stayed in one of the cars to direct the operation. The builder, his sons, the firm’s accountant and Cavataio held a late meeting together with some other men. All were armed as usual.

Provenzano and Bagarella led the attack, followed by Caruso. According to one account, Caruso fired too early, destroying the advantage of surprise. Cavataio was able to shoot and kill Bagarella and wound Caruso and Provenzano, before ducking under a desk, playing dead. Provenzano started pulling Cavataio’s ankles to get the Mafia organogramme – the rumour was that Cavataio kept it hidden in a sock. Cavataio tried to shoot Provenzano but he had run out of bullets. Provenzano tried to shoot with his machine gun, but it jammed, so he clubbed Cavataio unconscious with the butt. When he got his hand free, he grabbed his handgun and shot Cavataio dead.

The shoot-out lasted a few minutes and left five men dead: Cavataio, the mafioso Francesco Tumminello, the accountant Salvatore Bevilacqua, Giovanni Domè, a security guard, as well as Bagarella, one of the attackers. 108 bullets had been fired in the office. Bagarella's body was carried to waiting cars and was buried secretly on top of another in a cemetery in his hometown Corleone.

Provenzano had used a Beretta 38/A submachine gun and earned himself a reputation as a Mafia killer with the attack. The attack increased Provenzano’s reputation and his nickname, u’ tratturi (the tractor) because, as one pentito put it, ‘where he passed, the grass no longer grew’.

However, according to Gaetano Grado – one of the participants who turned government witness in 1999 – it was Provenzano who messed up the attack, shooting too early. Grado said he helped organize the hit and witnessed the murders first hand. "Everybody was scared of Cavataio," according to Grado, a cousin of the pentito Salvatore Contorno. All the mafia soldiers sent to kill Cavataio "were veterans," Grado said. "We all had already murdered at least 10 people."

== Viale Lazio trials ==
In September 1972, the trial for the Viale Lazio massacre took place; 24 defendants had been rounded up. Filippo and Angelo Moncada, the builder’s sons, were at first imprisoned on suspicion of being part of the plot. In hospital, where he was interned for his gunshot wounds, Fillippo started talking about his father’s meetings with notorious mafiosi, and described how Cavataio had gradually become the real boss in Moncada’s firm.

For the Moncada brothers to ‘talk’ was big news in Sicily. They were released from prison, but their father was placed in custody together with 24 alleged participants in the Viale Lazio massacre who had been rounded up on the evidence given by the two brothers. The final verdict of the jury at the first trial was that no evidence could be substantiated to prove that any of the 24 defendants had been directly responsible for the Viale Lazio massacre.

Many appeals would follow. In 2007, Salvatore Riina and Bernardo Provenzano went on trial for their role in the Viale Lazio Massacre that resulted on Cavataio and his men's deaths. Riina is accused of ordering the massacre and Provenzano is accused of taking part in it. In April 2009, nearly 40 years after the attack, they were both sentenced to life imprisonment.

== See also ==
- List of massacres in Italy
- Il Capo dei Capi
