= Paolo Giaccone =

Italian forensic pathologist and professor (March 21, 1929–August 11, 1982)

"He [Paolo Giaccone] was an important figure from a human and professional point of view. He was able to communicate with others, becoming a master of life."

— Professor Paolo Procaccianti on Paolo Giaccone.

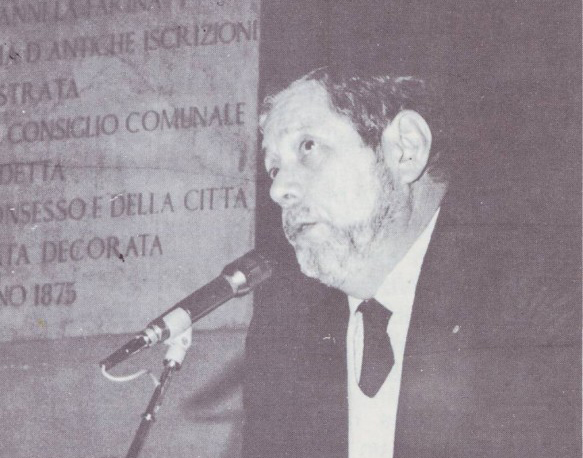
Paolo Giaccone

Paolo Giaccone (March 21, 1929 in Palermo, Italy – August 11, 1982 in Palermo, Italy) was an Italian forensic pathologist and a professor at the University of Palermo. He was murdered by the Sicilian Mafia in the General Hospital of Palermo, which was renamed in his honor "Paolo Giaccone General Hospital".

== Murder and investigations ==
On August 11, 1982, while Giaccone was going to work at the Institute of Forensic Pathology of Palermo, into the General Hospital, he was murdered. Investigations established that the killing was linked to a Giaccone's forensic examination blaming the boss Filippo Marchese for the massacre of Bagheria in 1981. A fingerprint was found on the site of the assassination, and it was scientifically established that the fingerprint belonged to Salvatore Rotolo, a "kid" of the family Marchese. Killing him in front of the institute was the sentence to be served by the medical examiner who had impeded their plans, and was used to give a strong warning to the colleagues of the victim.

Later the repentant Vincenzo Sinagra revealed the details of the crime, indicating the killer Salvatore Rotolo as the material perpetrator, who was therefore sentenced to life imprisonment in the first maxi trial at Cosa Nostra, in which the instigators of the murder were also judged (Salvatore Riina, Bernardo Provenzano, Michele Greco, Francesco Madonia, Pippo Calò, Bernardo Brusca, Antonino Geraci), also sentenced to life imprisonment.

== Acknowledgments ==
The Policlinico di Palermo was named after him, as well as a street in the historic park of the Favorita.

The figure of Giaccone and that of other victims of the mafia was mentioned in an episode of Il testimone, a broadcast of MTV conducted by Pif.
