= Gaetano Riina =

Italian mafioso

- Born: 5 November 1933; Corleone, Sicily, Italy
- Died: 22 February 2024 (aged 90); Mazara del Vallo, Sicily, Italy
- Other name: Zú Tano
- Occupation: Mafioso
- Relatives: Salvatore Riina (brother)
- Allegiance: Corleone Mafia family
- Criminal charges: Mafia association
- Penalty: Imprisonment

Gaetano Riina, known as Zú Tano (Corleone, Sicily, 5 November 1933 – Mazara del Vallo, Sicily, 22 February 2024) was an Italian mafioso linked to Cosa Nostra, younger brother of the historic mafia boss Totò Riina who was nicknamed "the Beast" for his brutality.

== Biography ==
Born in 1933 in Corleone, Sicily, Gaetano lost his father Giovanni and his younger brother Francesco, in 1943 due to a bomb explosion, during which he was also injured.

He likely worked as a farmer before becoming a point of reference for several mafiosi who came to him for advice, so much so that in 1982 he was appointed consigliere of the Corleonesi. Residing in Mazara del Vallo since the 1970s, he was a partner of Mariano Agate, the boss of the town and a faithful ally of his brother Totò.

On 28 January 1985, Judge Alberto Giacomelli, president of the preventive measures section of the Court of Trapani, ordered the confiscation of a villa and land owned by Gaetano Riina in Mazara del Vallo. For this reason, Giacomelli was brutally murdered in an ambush on 14 September 1988, after his retirement.

Gaetano Riina was arrested on 1 July 2011, together with his grandchildren Alessandro Correnti, and Giuseppe Grizzafi, accused for being the clan's cashier after nearly two years of wiretaps by the Carabinieri of the Corleone Company.

In 2014, it was discovered that Gaetano Riina was in agreement with the Casalesi clan to transport fruit and vegetables from Rome to Sicily and control the markets. The chosen company for transportation was Autofrigo Marsala, directed by Carmelo Gagliano.

In April 2021, due to his age and numerous health problems which, according to the judges, would impair his social dangerousness, he was released and placed under house arrest in Trapani Province. Riina, who had been imprisoned since 2011, would have completed his sentence in May 2024.

Gaetano Riina died on 22 February 2024. He was buried the following day in the cemetery of Mazara del Vallo without a formal funeral service, except for a Mass celebrated by the cemetery chaplain in defiance of his bishop's orders.
