= Ciaculli massacre =

1963 assassination attempt of Sicilian mafia boss Salvatore "Ciaschiteddu" Greco

- Location: Ciaculli, an outlying suburb of Palermo
- Date: 30 June 1963
- Target: Salvatore "Ciaschiteddu" Greco, head of the Sicilian Mafia Commission
- Attack type: Car bomb
- Deaths: Mario Malausa, Silvio Corrao, Calogero Vaccaro, Eugenio Altomare and Mario Farbelli from the Carabinieri, Pasquale Nuccio and Giorgio Ciacci from the Army.
- Perpetrators: Michele Cavataio, the Mafia boss of the Acquasanta quarter of Palermo

The Ciaculli massacre on 30 June 1963 was caused by a car bomb that exploded in Ciaculli, an outlying suburb of Palermo, killing seven police and military officers sent to defuse it after an anonymous phone call. The bomb was intended for Salvatore "Ciaschiteddu" Greco, head of the Sicilian Mafia Commission and the boss of the Ciaculli Mafia family. At first, mafia boss Pietro Torretta was considered to be the instigator behind the bomb attack, but it was eventually found to be Michele Cavataio.

The Ciaculli massacre was the culmination of a bloody Mafia war between rival clans in Palermo in the early 1960s—now known as the First Mafia War, a second started in the early 1980s—for the control of the profitable opportunities brought about by rapid urban growth and the illicit heroin trade to North America. The unprecedented ferocity of the struggle reaped 68 victims from 1961 to 1963.

== Preceding events ==
During the 1950s, the mafia had developed interests in urban property, land speculation, public sector construction, commercial transportation, and the wholesale fruit, vegetable, meat and fish markets that served the burgeoning city of Palermo, whose population rose by 100,000 between 1951 and 1961.

A relationship developed between mafiosi and a new generation of politicians of the Christian Democratic Party (Democrazia Cristiana) such as Salvo Lima and Vito Ciancimino. Lima was connected to Angelo La Barbera, Tommaso Buscetta and the leading construction entrepreneur Francesco Vassallo.

The period from 1958 to 1964, during which Lima served as mayor of Palermo and Ciancimino served as assessor for public works, was later referred to as the "Sack of Palermo". Throughout this five-year span, 4,000 building licences were signed, more than half in the names of three pensioners with no connection to the construction industry. The construction boom led to the destruction of the city's green belt, and distinctive villas were replaced by apartment blocks.

== First Mafia War ==
The Mafia war was sparked by a quarrel over a lost heroin shipment and the murder of Calcedonio Di Pisa—an ally of the Grecos—in December 1962. The Grecos suspected the brothers Angelo and Salvatore La Barbera of perpetrating the attack.

The Ciaculli massacre shifted the Mafia war into a war against the Mafia, which in turn prompted the first concerted anti-mafia efforts by the state in post-war Italy. Within a period of ten weeks, 1,200 mafiosi were arrested, many of whom would be kept out of circulation for as many as five to six years. The Sicilian Mafia Commission was dissolved, and of those mafiosi who had escaped arrest—among them Tommaso Buscetta—many went to the United States, Canada, Argentina, Brazil and Venezuela. Salvatore "Cicchiteddu" Greco fled to Caracas in Venezuela.

The atrocity galvanized the Italian Parliament into implementing a law for the constitution of an Antimafia Commission; the law passed in December 1962, and the Commission met for the first time on July 6, 1963. Its final report was submitted in 1976.

== Perpetrators ==
The body of Cavataio after the shooting at Viale Lazio

According to Tommaso Buscetta, who became a cooperating witness in 1984, Michele Cavataio, the boss of the Acquasanta quarter of Palermo, was responsible for the Ciaculli bomb. Cavataio had lost out to the Greco Mafia clan in a war for control of the wholesale market in the mid-1950s. Cavataio killed Di Pisa with the belief that the La Barberas would be blamed by the Grecos and a war would result; he ultimately continued to fuel the war with additional bomb attacks and killings.

Cavataio was backed by other Mafia families, who resented the growing power of the Sicilian Mafia Commission to the detriment of individual Mafia families. Cavataio was killed on 10 December 1969 in the Viale Lazio in Palermo as retaliation for the events in 1963; the assassination was carried out by a Mafia hit squad including Bernardo Provenzano, Calogero Bagarella (an elder brother of Leoluca Bagarella the brother-in-law of Totò Riina), Emanuele D’Agostino of Stefano Bontade’s Santa Maria di Gesù Family, Gaetano Grado, and Damiano Caruso, a soldier of Giuseppe Di Cristina, the Mafia boss of Riesi. The attack is known as the Viale Lazio massacre (Lazio Boulevard Massacre).

Several top Mafia bosses had decided to eliminate Cavataio on the advice of Salvatore "Ciaschiteddu" Greco. Greco had come to subscribe to Buscetta’s theory regarding the initial catalyst for the First Mafia War. The composition of the hit squad, according to Buscetta, was a clear indication that the killing had been sanctioned collectively by all the major Sicilian Mafia families; not only did it include Calogero Bagarella from Corleone and a member of Stefano Bontate’s family in Palermo, but also a soldier of Giuseppe Di Cristina’s family from Riesi, on the opposite end of Sicily. The Viale Lazio bloodbath marked the end of a ‘pax mafiosa’ that had reigned since the Ciaculli massacre.

== Villabate massacre ==
In the same day of the massacre of Ciaculli, in Villabate there was another car-bomb attack in which two civilians, Giuseppe Tesauro and Pietro Cannizzaro, died.

== Victims ==
The seven victims of the massacre were Mario Malausa, Silvio Corrao, Calogero Vaccaro, Eugenio Altomare and Mario Farbelli from the Carabinieri, and Pasquale Nuccio and Giorgio Ciacci from the Italian Army.

== See also ==
- List of massacres in Italy
- List of victims of the Sicilian Mafia
- Il Capo dei Capi
