= Pietro Torretta =

20th-century Sicilian Mafia member

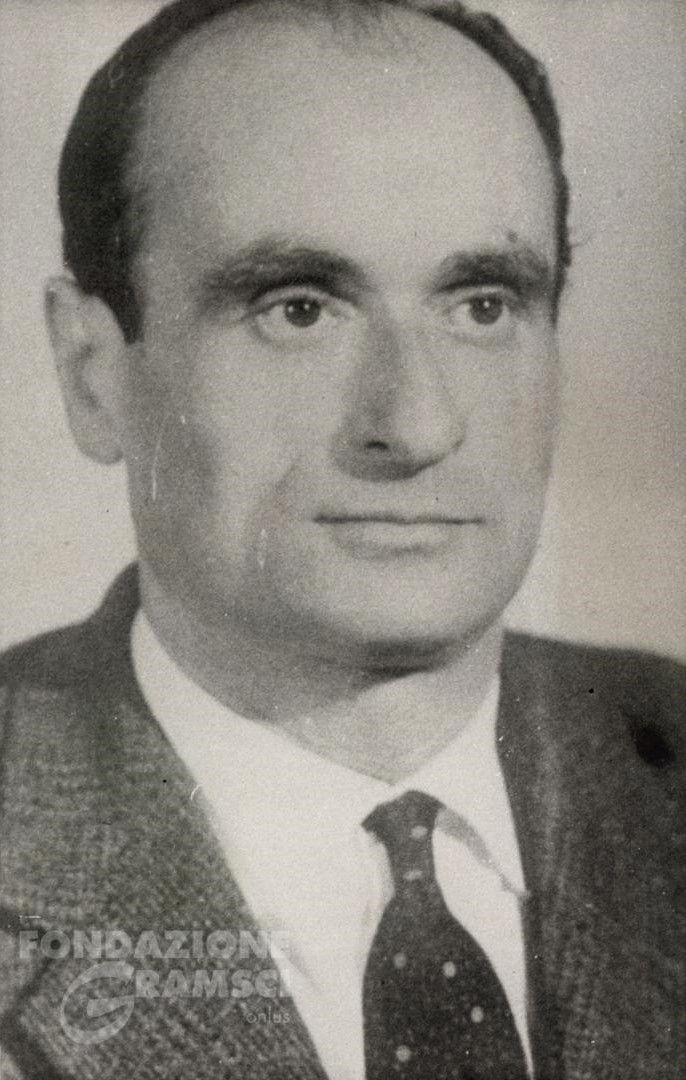
- Mafia boss Pietro Torretta at his arrest in 1964
- Born: ca. 1912; Palermo, Sicily, Italy
- Died: 3 October 1975 (age 63); Asinara, Italy
- Known for: Protagonist in the First Mafia War
- Allegiance: Uditore Mafia family / Sicilian Mafia
- Criminal charges: Murder
- Penalty: 27 years at the Trial of the 114 against the Mafia in Catanzaro in December 1968

Pietro Torretta (ca. 1912 – 3 October 1975) was a member of the Sicilian Mafia. He was the boss of the Mafia family in the Uditore district in Palermo and one of the protagonists in the First Mafia War. He was initially considered to be the man behind the Ciaculli massacre.

== Early career ==
Torretta hailed from a long line of Mafiosi. He probably was the son of Francesco Torretta who is mentioned in the Sangiorgi report at the turn of the 20th century as major Mafioso. Pietro Torretta was a member of the band of bandit Salvatore Giuliano. He was first arrested in 1948 on extortion charges but released for lack of evidence.

He came from a poor background and began his career as a watchman/guard and gabellotto. First, he rose through the ranks, a simple Mafia soldier, to becoming a boss. According to people who knew him, he was tall, thin, elegant, casual, balanced and on the whole, sympathetic in his social relations; "he spoke and behaved as a wise father". On the other hand, The New York Times described him as short, slight and fastidious in dress, with a rock-hard impassive face, deeply sunken cheeks and a slit of a mouth.

== Mafia upstart ==
In the 1950s and 1960s, Torretta together with other upstart Mafia bosses like the La Barbera brothers and their henchmen formed the so-called ‘New Mafia’ which adopted new gangster techniques. Other smaller cosche came to recognize the supremacy of these bosses – a supremacy achieved by sheer violence. Men who were starting their ‘careers’ in their shadow were forming into a new generation of mafiosi; they had initiative, and the road to leadership of a cosca had suddenly become quicker and available to those who were fast with their tommy-guns. One of the other upstarts was Tommaso Buscetta, another was Gerlando Alberti.

Torretta actively participated in what is called the Sack of Palermo. In 1959, the Christian Democrat Salvo Lima became mayor of Palermo. That became the peak period of Palermo’s controversial building boom and of warfare among the capital’s cosche making money in the real estate business. Mafia bosses were granted building licenses through contacts with politicians. The construction boom destroyed the city's green belt and villas that gave it architectural grace, to make way for characterless and shoddily constructed apartment blocks.

== First Mafia War ==
Torretta was one of the protagonists of the First Mafia War. He sided with the La Barbera brothers against a rival group headed by Salvatore Greco "Ciaschiteddu". When Angelo La Barbera was shot and arrested in Milan in May 1963, both Torretta and Buscetta considered themselves to be the successors of Angelo La Barbera. Torretta proposed himself as the capo of Palermo Centro and Buscetta as his deputy. However, the Grecos thought Buscetta in particular was a dangerous man to promote. The dispute gradually re-ignited hostilities between Torretta, Buscetta and the Grecos. Torretta and Buscetta acted first by ambushing two of their enemies in Torretta’s house.

On June 30, 1963, a car bomb in Ciaculli killed seven police and military officers sent to defuse it after an anonymous phone call. The outrage over the Ciaculli massacre changed the Mafia war into a war against the Mafia. It prompted the first concerted anti-Mafia efforts by the state in post-war Italy. The Sicilian Mafia Commission was dissolved, and of those Mafiosi who had escaped arrest many went abroad. Torretta was suspected of being the man behind the bomb attack, but it was eventually found to be Michele Cavataio.

== Arrest and conviction ==
On 9 February 1964, Torretta was arrested. He was one of the main defendants in the indictment concerning the Mafia war which bore his name (Pietro Torretta + 121 indictment by investigative magistrate Cesare Terranova) in May 1965. Attributed to him were 14 killings, either ordered or personally executed. Among these were the victims of the Ciaculli massacre.

He was one of the few Mafiosi who received a heavy sentence at the Trial of the 114 against the Mafia in Catanzaro in December 1968. He was sentenced to 27 years. Pending appeal, he was released on a US$1,400 bail and under the condition he was forced to live in exile in Cittadella, a northern Italian town.

Banished from Sicily, Torretta died on 3 October 1975, of kidney failure on the island Asinara. He was a stereotype of the gangster-mafioso of the 1960s. Men like Torretta, Angelo La Barbera, Rosario Mancino and Tommaso Buscetta among others were vague and doubtful figures, disorganized in their lives and their activities typifying a moment of transition and crisis in Cosa Nostra.

== Sources ==
- Arlacchi, Pino (1988). Mafia Business. The Mafia Ethic and the Spirit of Capitalism, Oxford: Oxford University Press ISBN 0-19-285197-7
- (in Italian) Caruso, Alfio (2000). Da cosa nasce cosa. Storia della mafia del 1943 a oggi, Milan: Longanesi ISBN 88-304-1620-7
- Dickie, John (2004). Cosa Nostra. A history of the Sicilian Mafia, London: Coronet, ISBN 0-340-82435-2
- Lupo, Salvatore (2009). History of the Mafia, New York: Columbia University Press, ISBN 978-0-231-13134-6
- Servadio, Gaia (1976), Mafioso. A history of the Mafia from its origins to the present day, London: Secker & Warburg ISBN 0-436-44700-2
- Stille, Alexander (1995). Excellent Cadavers. The Mafia and the Death of the First Italian Republic, New York: Vintage ISBN 0-09-959491-9
