= Michele Cavataio =

Italian mafia boss

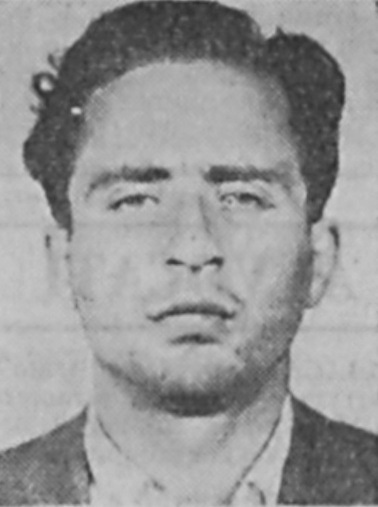
- Cavataio, c. 1963
- Born: 18 March 1929; Palermo, Sicily, Italy
- Died: 10 December 1969 (aged 40); Palermo, Sicily, Italy
- Cause of death: Gunshots
- Other name: Il cobra
- Allegiance: Acquasanta Mafia family / Sicilian Mafia

Michele Cavataio (18 March 1929 – 10 December 1969), also known as Il cobra (The cobra) was an Italian criminal and powerful member of the Sicilian Mafia. He was the boss of the Acquasanta mandamento in Palermo and was a member of the first Sicilian Mafia Commission. Some sources spell his surname as Cavatajo.

Cavataio was one of the most feared mafiosi of his time. His nickname The Cobra allegedly came from his favourite firearm, the Colt Cobra, a six-shot revolver. He was described as "a cunning killer with a gorilla-like face".

== Early Mafia career ==
Cavataio was seen as an exponent of a 'new' Mafia of Americanised gangsters that appeared in the mid-1950s. After World War II, he made his fortune selling petrol that was stolen from the Italian Navy. From the modest position of a taxi driver, he accumulated a considerable fortune in a few years, and, like any self-respecting mafioso, a string of acquittals, according to the 1976 final report of the Parliamentary Antimafia Commission.

The Acquasanta Mafia family, headed by Gaetano Galatolo and Nicola D'Alessandro, controlled the docks of Palermo that were situated in their area. They acted as strike breakers against the dockworkers, and did not hesitate to shoot at the strikers if necessary. In 1955, Galatolo and D'Alessandro were killed in a dispute over the protection rackets when the fruit and vegetable wholesale market moved from the Zisa area to Acquasanta, disturbing the delicate power balances within Cosa Nostra. The killer of Galatolo was never identified, but Cavataio was suspected. Cavataio became the new boss of the clan and had to agree to split the profits of the wholesale market racket with the Greco Mafia clan of Ciaculli, who traditionally controlled fruit and vegetable supply to Palermo wholesale market.

Cavataio actively participated in what is called the 'Sack of Palermo' during the reign of Salvo Lima as mayor of Palermo. Mafia bosses were granted building licenses through contacts with politicians. The construction boom destroyed the city's green belt and villas that gave it architectural grace, to make way for characterless and shoddily constructed apartment blocks.

== First Mafia War ==
Cavataio was one of the protagonists of the first Mafia War in 1962–63. According to the pentito Tommaso Buscetta it was Michele Cavataio who deliberately escalated a dispute between different factions. The conflict erupted over an underweight shipment of heroin. The shipment was financed by Cesare Manzella, the Greco cousins from Ciaculli and the La Barbera brothers. Suspicion fell on Calcedonio Di Pisa, who had collected the heroin and had organised the transport to New York. The case was brought before the Mafia Commission, but disagreement on how to handle it led to a bloody conflict between clans allied with the Grecos, headed by Salvatore "Ciaschiteddu" Greco, and clans allied with the La Barberas – in particular when Di Pisa was killed on 26 December 1962. The Grecos suspected the La Barberas of the attack.

However, according to Buscetta, it had been Cavataio who had killed Di Pisa in the knowledge that the Grecos would blame the La Barberas and a war would be the result. Cavataio – having his own problems with Di Pisa and wanting him out of the way, and on bad terms with the La Barberas as well – contrived Di Pisa's murder in such a way that the La Barberas would appear responsible. He kept fuelling the conflict with more bomb attacks and killings. Other Mafia families who resented the growing power of the Sicilian Mafia Commission to the detriment of individual Mafia families backed Cavataio. Behind both Cavataio and La Barbera was an alliance of bosses from the north-west of Palermo who resented the commission's growing power, and the influence of the south-eastern Palermo cosche such as the Grecos.

Cavataio then participated, along with Pietro Torretta, Buscetta and another Acquasanta capo, in several car bomb attacks on the Grecos and their allies, considered enemies because of their intrusion in the wholesale produce market. He was responsible for a car bomb that exploded near Greco's house in Ciaculli on 30 June 1963, killing seven police and military officers sent to defuse it after an anonymous phone call. The outrage over the Ciaculli massacre changed the Mafia war into a war against the Mafia. It prompted the first concerted anti-Mafia efforts by the state in post-war Italy. The Sicilian Mafia Commission was dissolved and of those mafiosi who had escaped arrest, many went abroad. Cavataio was arrested.

Cavataio was arrested in July 1963. He received a four-year sentence at the Trial of the 114 against the Mafia in Catanzaro in December 1968, despite an indictment for ten murders. He was sentenced for criminal association and soon left jail when in appeal his sentence was reduced to two years.

== Growing suspicion ==
The Ciaculli bombing made the other Mafia clans aware of Cavataio's manipulation of the Mafia War. When the bomb exploded, Salvatore La Barbera was already dead and his brother Angelo La Barbera had fled to Milan, where he was seriously wounded. It became clear that Cavataio – and not the La Barberas – had planted the bomb and fomented much of the trouble.

Other Mafia bosses started to realise Cavataio's double-crossing role in the Mafia war. In retaliation, during a meeting in Zürich, several top Mafia bosses decided to eliminate Cavataio on the instigation of Salvatore "Ciaschiteddu" Greco who had come all the way from Venezuela. Greco had come to subscribe to Buscetta's theory about how the First Mafia War began.

During a peace negotiation with other senior mafiosi, Cavataio pulled out a map of Palermo on which had written down the names of all the known mafiosi of Palermo and marked their territories. He used this map as a visual aid to describe how he wanted the Palermo families to be reorganized. The other mafiosi in the meeting were outraged that Cavataio had drawn that map, for if it fell into the hands of the police, it would have made the Mafia extremely vulnerable. There was a strict prohibition in the Mafia against writing incriminating information on paper. In his memoir, the mafioso Antonino Calderone claimed that this map sealed Cavataio's fate.

== Killed by the Mafia ==
The body of Cavataio after the hit in Viale Lazio

Cavataio and three of his men were killed on 10 December 1969 in the Viale Lazio – a modern street in the smart new northern area of Palermo – by a Mafia hit squad including Bernardo Provenzano, Calogero Bagarella (an elder brother of Leoluca Bagarella the brother-in-law of Totò Riina), Emanuele D'Agostino and Gaetano Grado of Stefano Bontade's Santa Maria di Gesù Family, and Damiano Caruso, a soldier of Giuseppe Di Cristina, the Mafia boss of Riesi. The attack is known as the Viale Lazio massacre (Lazio Street Massacre).

The killers entered the office of the construction company of Girolamo Moncada, the builder who had been connected with Angelo La Barbera and now with Cavataio. Cavataio was able to shoot and kill Calogero Bagarella and wound Caruso before Provenzano killed him with a Beretta 38/A submachine gun and earned himself a reputation as a Mafia killer with the attack. However, according to one of the participants who turned government witness in 1999, Gaetano Grado, it was Provenzano who messed up the attack, shooting too early. In the office 108 bullets had been fired.

Grado said he helped organise the hit and witnessed the murders first-hand. "Everybody was scared of Cavataio," according to Grado, a cousin of the pentito Salvatore Contorno. All the mafia soldiers sent to kill Cavataio "were veterans," Grado said. "We all had already murdered at least 10 people."

The composition of the hit squad, according to Buscetta, was a clear indication that the killing had been sanctioned collectively by all the major Sicilian Mafia families: not only did it include Calogero Bagarella from Corleone, and a member of Stefano Bontate's family in Palermo, but also a soldier of Giuseppe Di Cristina's family on the other end of Sicily in Riesi. The Viale Lazio bloodbath marked the end of a ‘pax mafiosa’ that had reigned since the Ciaculli Massacre until the end of the Trial of the 114.

== Viale Lazio trials ==
In September 1972, the trial for the Viale Lazio massacre took place; 24 defendants had been rounded up. Filippo and Angelo Moncada, the builder's sons, were at first imprisoned on suspicion of being part of the plot. In the hospital, where he was interned for his gunshot wounds, Filippo started talking about his father's meetings with notorious mafiosi, and described how Cavataio had gradually become the real boss in Moncada's firm.

For the Moncada brothers to ‘talk’ was big news in Sicily. They were released from prison, but their father was placed in custody together with 24 alleged participants in the Viale Lazio massacre who had been rounded up on the evidence given by the two brothers. The final verdict of the jury at the first trial was that no evidence could be substantiated to prove that any of the 24 defendants had been directly responsible for the Viale Lazio massacre.

Many appeals would follow. In 2007, Salvatore Riina and Bernardo Provenzano went on trial for their role in the Viale Lazio Massacre that resulted in Cavataio and his men's deaths. Riina is accused of ordering the massacre and Provenzano is accused of taking part in it. In April 2009, nearly 40 years after the attack, they were both sentenced to life imprisonment.

== Sources ==
- Arlacchi, Pino (1993). Men of Dishonor: inside the Sicilian Mafia, New York : Morrow ISBN 0-688-04574-X
- (in Italian) Relazione sull’infiltrazione mafiosa nei Cantieri Navali di Palermo Commissione parliamentare d’inchiesta sul fenomeno della mafia, 26 gennaio 1998.
- (in Italian) Caruso, Alfio (2000). Da cosa nasce cosa. Storia della mafia del 1943 a oggi, Milan: Longanesi ISBN 88-304-1620-7
- Dickie, John (2004). Cosa Nostra. A history of the Sicilian Mafia, London: Hodder & Stoughton, ISBN 0-340-82435-2
- Follain, John (2009). The Last Godfathers: Inside the Mafia's Most Infamous Family, New York : Thomas Dunne Books ISBN 978-0-312-56690-6
- Longrigg, Clare (2008). Boss of Bosses. How Bernardo Provenzano Saved the Mafia, London: John Murray, ISBN 978-0-7195-6849-7
- Schneider, Jane T. & Peter T. Schneider (2003). Reversible Destiny: Mafia, Antimafia, and the Struggle for Palermo, Berkeley: University of California Press ISBN 0-520-23609-2
- Servadio, Gaia (1976). Mafioso. A history of the Mafia from its origins to the present day, London: Secker & Warburg ISBN 0-440-55104-8
- Shawcross, Tim; Young, Martin (1987). Men of honour: the confessions of Tommaso Buscetta (1. publ ed.). London: Collins. ISBN 978-0-00-217589-0.
- Stille, Alexander (1995). Excellent Cadavers. The Mafia and the Death of the First Italian Republic, New York: Vintage ISBN 0-09-959491-9
