= Salvatore Contorno =

Member of the Sicilian Mafia

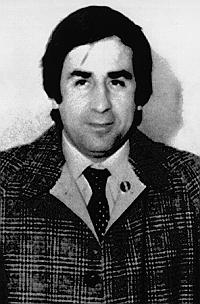
- Born: 28 May 1946 (age 80); Palermo, Sicily, Italy
- Other name: "Totuccio"
- Occupation: Mobster
- Allegiance: Sicilian Mafia

Salvatore Contorno (Italian pronunciation: [salvaˈtoːre konˈtorno]; born 28 May 1946), called Totuccio, is a former member of the Sicilian Mafia who turned into a state witness (pentito) against Cosa Nostra in October 1984, following the example of Tommaso Buscetta. He gave detailed accounts of the inner-workings of the Sicilian Mafia. His testimonies were crucial in the Maxi Trial against the Sicilian Mafia in Palermo and the Pizza Connection trial in New York City in the mid 1980s.

== Early Mafia career ==
Contorno was born in Palermo. His father Antonino had been a mafioso from the later dissolved Corso Calatafimi Mafia family. Salvatore Contorno was a godson of Salvatore "Ciaschiteddu" Greco, who would go on to become the secretary of the Sicilian Mafia Commission. In 1975, the butcher Totuccio Contorno was initiated in the Santa Maria di Gesù Mafia family in Palermo, then led by Stefano Bontade, an influential member of the Sicilian Mafia Commission and a close ally of Ciaschiteddu. Contorno and Bontade used to be hunting companions in the 1960s. Although he was just a soldier in the Mafia family, Contorno reported directly to the boss Bontade. He was one of Bontade's trusted hitmen.

Contorno became a cigarette smuggler and heroin trafficker. His cousins, the Grado brothers imported morphine base from Turkey, which was refined into heroin in laboratories on Sicily. He was also involved in kidnapping, for which he was sentenced to 22 years in prison. From 1976-79 Contorno was in compulsory internal exile in Venice after completing a prison term for belonging to a criminal organisation. However, he frequently returned to Palermo. At the time he was bankrupt, because his frozen-meat business had failed. He needed to borrow money to invest in heroin shipments.

== Second Mafia War ==
During the Second Mafia War — when the Corleonesi allies of Michele Greco and Salvatore Riina attacked the established Mafia families of Palermo — the Corleonesi killed Contorno's boss, Stefano Bontade, in April 1981. They went on to eliminate other members of the Santa Maria di Gesù family that were lured to the estate of Michele Greco where they were wiped out. Contorno did not turn up to the fateful meeting at Greco's estate. He sensed trouble and went into hiding.

On 25 June 1981, Contorno narrowly escaped a murder attempt by Pino Greco (Scarpuzzedda, little shoe) and Giuseppe Lucchese — the favourite hitmen of the Corleonesi. The Corleonesi employed a scorched earth policy to hunt down Contorno, killing his relatives and friends, to prevent them from hiding him. Despite this approach, they were unable to find him, which earned Contorno the nickname Coriolano della Floresta, a kind of popular Sicilian version of Robin Hood.

== Arrest ==
While in hiding from both the authorities and the Corleonesi, Contorno sent anonymous letters to the police, revealing information on the Mafia, its members, the various factions and the violent turmoil it was undergoing. Police Superintendent Antonino Ninni Cassarà developed a relationship with Contorno as an informant, code-naming him Fonte di Prima Luce (Source of First Light).

Contorno was arrested on 23 March 1982, in Rome, where he had gone to prepare for the murder of Giuseppe Pippo Calò whom Contorno held responsible for the murder of his boss Stefano Bontade. "Too bad I didn't succeed," he said during the Maxi Trial. When he was captured, police found several weapons, two bulletproof cars, tens of thousands of dollars in cash, 140 kilograms of hashish and two kilos of heroin. The arrest probably saved his life, making Contorno one of the few survivors of the losing factions in the Second Mafia War.

Contorno's revelations were the first time the authorities learned of Michele Greco's high-ranking membership of the Mafia. Previously he had just been regarded as a rather secretive landowner with a suspiciously high income, although he did come from a long line of Mafiosi. Cassarà used Contorno to create a map of the families of the Palermo region and a report on their increasingly confrontational relations and involvement in narcotics (the so-called Greco+161 report on 13 July 1982). Working closely with Judge Giovanni Falcone, two months later the police unleashed a dragnet roundup of 162 Mafiosi wanted for drug trafficking and homicide.

== Pentito and Maxi Trial ==
Despite his arrest, Contorno refused to collaborate any more with Cassarà and Falcone. After the decision of Tommaso Buscetta to collaborate, Contorno changed his mind. According to some, Buscetta met Contorno who supposedly fell to his knees and kissed Buscetta's hand. Buscetta allegedly put his hand on his shoulder and said: "It's all right, Totuccio, you can talk." Contorno began collaborating in October 1984, and a week later 127 arrest warrants were issued against mafiosi.

Information provided by Tommaso Buscetta, plus the evidence of Salvatore Contorno, led to the first Maxi Trial which involved 475 defendants which ended in December 1987, 22 months after it began, with 338 convictions. Contorno received a reduced sentence of six years due to his collaboration with the prosecution.

While Buscetta provided important information on the inner workings of the Mafia, it was Contorno who was more effective as a witness, naming names and explaining the Mafia's heroin trafficking. He testified in a rapid, often incomprehensible specific Palermitan dialect and Mafia jargon that had to be translated for the official record. He held the court room captivated with his open contempt for the brotherhood he had once belonged to. Now, he said it was "just a gang of bullies and murderers". They had killed a dozen of his direct relatives.

== Pizza Connection Trial ==
Contorno was a key witness in the Pizza Connection Trial. He agreed to testify, and was a protected witness in the United States for four years. He gave evidence that directly linked some defendants to heroin trafficking. Contorno testified that defendant Frank Castronovo, cousin of Carlo Castronovo in Sicily, used pizza parlors as fronts in the United States. Contorno also testified that he had a meeting in 1980 in Bagheria about heroin and had seen Castronovo there with three other defendants—Salvatore Catalano, Gaetano Mazzara, and Salvatore Greco, brother of Leonardo Greco, the boss of Bagheria.

Contorno watched as the men "took out two plastic garbage bags and extracted packages of white powder in clear plastic envelopes, each bearing different tiny scissor cuts or pen or pencil marks to identify the individual owner. They poured samples of the powder into a bottle heating on a hot plate." These same marked samples would later be intercepted by the DEA as a seizure of 40 kilograms of 85 percent pure heroin which was "$8 million worth at Mafia importer’s prices and at least $80 million worth at street prices."

== Later life ==
Contorno returned to Italy in late 1988. On 26 May 1989, Contorno was arrested again in a hideout near Palermo together with his cousin Gaetano Grado and a cache of weapons. The affair became a scandal in July 1989 when anonymous letters signed by "il corvo" (literally "raven", but meaning "provocateur") claimed that prosecuting judge Giovanni Falcone and his close collaborator, police inspector Gianni De Gennaro, had organised Contorno's secret return from protective custody in the US to Sicily to start a state sponsored vendetta against the Corleonesi. The allegations against Falcone and De Gennaro proved to be a hoax, but further weakened Falcone's already difficult position in the prosecuting office in Palermo. Contorno was in contact with De Gennaro prior to his arrest, who tried to monitor his movements.

In April 1994, a bomb was discovered close to the secret hideout of Contorno near Rome in the midst of a campaign of the Corleonesi against state collaborators, however the explosives were found by police on a tip from an informant before they could be used against Contorno as ordered by Matteo Messina Denaro. In January 1997 Contorno was arrested again, because of his involvement in dealing 2 kilograms of heroin in the early 1990s, which resulted from the investigations into the bombing attempt. He was sentenced to six years in prison. In October 1997, an arrest warrant was issued against Contorno for drug trafficking, together with his cousin Gaetano Grado.

In November 2004, Contorno was arrested again for extorting a former fellow cellmate, but the charges were dropped. According to the writer Leonardo Sciascia, Contorno lived inside the world of the Mafia "the way the rest of us live inside our own skin, as if the Mafia were a state into which you were born and always remained a citizen of."
