= Leoluca Bagarella =

Italian Mafia boss and convicted murderer (born 1942)

- Mugshot of Bagarella after his arrest in 1995
- Born: 3 February 1942 (age 84); Corleone, Sicily, Italy
- Other name: "Don Luchino"
- Occupation: Mafia boss
- Spouse: Vincenzina Marchese (m. 1991; died 1995)
- Relatives: Calogero Bagarella (brother); Salvatore Riina (brother-in-law); Giuseppe Marchese (brother-in-law)
- Status: Imprisoned since 1995
- Allegiance: Corleone Mafia family Corleonesi
- Convictions: Mafia association Multiple murders
- Criminal charges: Mafia association Multiple murders
- Penalty: 13 terms of life imprisonment

Leoluca Bagarella (Italian pronunciation: [ˌlɛoˈluːka baɡaˈrɛlla]; born 3 February 1942) is an Italian criminal and member of the Sicilian Mafia. He is from the town of Corleone. Following his brother-in-law Salvatore Riina's arrest in early 1993, Bagarella became the head of the "Fazione Stragista" (litt. "mass murder faction"), opposing another faction commanded by Riina's heir presumptive Bernardo Provenzano, creating a real rift in Cosa Nostra. Bagarella was arrested in 1995, having been a fugitive for four years, and sentenced to life imprisonment for Mafia association and multiple murders.

== Early life ==
Bagarella was born in Corleone on 3 February 1942. Bagarella sided with Luciano Leggio of the Corleonesi in the late 1950s. Bagarella became the brother-in-law of Salvatore Riina in 1974 when Riina married Bagarella's sister, Antonia. Two of Bagarella's brothers were also Mafiosi; his elder brother, Calogero Bagarella, was shot dead on December 10, 1969, in the Viale Lazio in Palermo, during a shootout with rival mafioso Michele Cavataio and his men, is what is known as the Viale Lazio massacre. A second brother, Giuseppe, was murdered in prison in 1972.

On 21 July 1979, Bagarella killed police chief Boris Giuliano. Giuliano was shot dead in the Lux Bar in Palermo having a cappuccino while waiting for his car to take him to work early in the morning. Bagarella shot Giuliano in the neck three times and, standing over the body, fired four bullets into Giuliano's back before making his escape.

Giuliano's flying squad was investigating Bagarella after he had discovered his hiding place. Bagarella had managed to escape in time, but Giuliano's weapons, four kilograms of heroin and false documents with photographs depicting Bagarella were discovered.

Bagarella shot five times and killed investigative journalist Mario Francese on 26 January 1979, in front of his house in Palermo.

== Terrorist campaign ==
Bagarella married Vincenzina Marchese in 1991. The powerfully built Bagarella modelled himself on the eponymous character of the film The Godfather, so when he married the attractive niece of a boss he had the movie theme played at a lavish party. According to pentito Toni Calvaruso, Vincenzina committed suicide on 12 May 1995, due to her depressive state after a series of miscarriages, her brother Giuseppe Marchese becoming a pentito and her husband's involvement with the kidnapping of 12 year-old Giuseppe Di Matteo (who was subsequently killed nearly a year after her own death).

Riina's reign as "boss of bosses" suffered a severe setback when hundreds of mafiosi were found guilty at the Maxi Trial in 1986/87. Once the convictions were upheld by higher courts in January 1992, Riina ordered the murder of high-profile prosecutor Giovanni Falcone, a decision that was taken over an objection by Ignazio Salvo, who had argued that Falcone was best neutralized through political machinations.

Following Riina's arrest in January 1993, Bagarella was believed to have taken over the Corleonesi, rivalling Riina's putative successor, Bernardo Provenzano. In a meeting at Villabate, it was decided that both Provenzano and Bagarella should be in charge of holding the Corleonesi mandate together.

On 27 May 1993, a bomb under the Torre dei Pulci killed five people: Fabrizio Nencioni, his wife Angelamaria, their daughters, nine-year-old Nadia and two-month-old Caterina, and Dario Capolicchio, aged 20. Thirty-three people were injured. Further attacks on art galleries and churches left 10 dead with many injured, and caused outrage among Italians. At least one high-ranking investigator believed most of those who carried out murders for Cosa Nostra at this time answered solely to Bagarella, and that consequently Bagarella actually wielded more power than Provenzano, who was Riina's formal successor.

Provenzano protested about the terrorist attacks, but Bagarella responded sarcastically, telling him to wear a sign saying "I don't have anything to do with the massacres". Bagarella stopped ordering murders sometime before his capture, apparently due to the suicide of his wife Vincenzina.

== Arrest and conviction ==
On 24 June 1995, Bagarella was arrested, having been a fugitive for four years. Bagarella was convicted of multiple murders and imprisoned for life. These included the murders of Giuliano, Francese, Giuseppe Russo, Falcone, Giuseppe Di Matteo, Antonino Burrafato, Salvatore Caravà, Ignazio Di Giovanni, Simone Lo Manto and Raimondo Mulè.

In 2002, Bagarella had protested about his treatment under the Article 41-bis prison regime law that placed heavy restrictions on jailed Mafia bosses to prevent them from running their criminal empires from behind bars. At a court appearance that June, Bagarella made some thinly veiled threats to the Italian government, saying the Mafia is "tired of being exploited, humiliated, oppressed and used like goods exchanged among the various political forces." Some interpreted this as a sign the Mafia was annoyed that its previously cosy relationship with politicians had broken down, speculating about Mafia bosses having been in some sort of clandestine negotiations with politicians. In 2005, he launched boiling oil against an 'Ndrangheta boss prisoner, leading to a further one-year sentence. Following the violence, he was transferred to a prison in Parma.

In total, Bagarella was given 13 life sentences plus 106 years and ten months, and solitary confinement for 6 years.

On 20 April 2018, he was sentenced to a further 28 years in prison.

== In popular culture ==
Characters based on Leoluca Bagarella were featured in the 2007 Italian TV series Il Capo dei Capi, the 2014 TV series Furore, the 2018 TV series Il cacciatore, the 2007 film L'ultimo dei Corleonesi, and the 2013 film La mafia uccide solo d'estate.

== Bibliography ==
- Dickie, John (2004). Cosa Nostra. A history of the Sicilian Mafia, London: Coronet, ISBN 0-340-82435-2
- Follain, John (2012). Vendetta: The Mafia, Judge Falcone and the Quest for Justice, London: Hodder & Stoughton, ISBN 978-1-444-71411-1
- Jamieson, Alison (1999). The Antimafia: Italy's fight against organized crime, London: Palgrave Macmillan, ISBN 0-333-80158-X
- Longrigg, Clare (1998). Mafia Women, London: Vintage ISBN 0-09-959171-5
- Servadio, Gaia (1976), Mafioso. A history of the Mafia from its origins to the present day, London: Secker & Warburg ISBN 0-436-44700-2
