= Gaetano Grado =

Italian mafioso

Gaetano Grado (born in Palermo, 8 March 1943) is an Italian mafioso from Palermo, Sicily. He was a member of the Santa Maria di Gesù family under Stefano Bontade until his arrest, after which he became a justice collaborator.

== Biography ==
Gaetano Grado and his brother Antonino Grado were among the trusted men of the Mafia faction led by Stefano Bontade. Jointly with his brothers Vincenzo, Salvatore, Giacomo and Antonio, started to import morphine base from Turkey in 1975, which was refined into heroin in laboratories run by Santa Maria di Gesù Mafia family on Sicily, and subsequently trafficked into the United States.

Gaetano was a feared killer, and once killed a group of teenagers only because they were making noise in a restaurant he was dining and interrupting his meal: two of them were strangled and the remaining three gunned down. For his reputation Grado was among the soldiers of Stefano Bontade, alongside Emanuele D'Agostino, sent to assassinate the Mafia boss Michele Cavataio in what later became known as the Viale Lazio massacre on December 10, 1969.

Grado murdered Giuseppe Graviano's father in 1982 because the Graviano were killing the Contornos and Grados.

In the following years, Grado was among the first who became suspicious of the danger of Totò Riina, and recommended to his boss Stefano Bontade that Riina be eliminated before he became a serious threat to their organization. Bontade however was not yet convinced of Riina's treachery and ordered Grado to help Riina in his attempts to hide from the state, as he was at the time wanted for murder.

When the Second Mafia War started, Grado fought the Corleonesi but soon fled for Spain when his boss, Stefano Bontade was murdered. He came back to Sicily when his brother Antonino was killed by the Corleonesi to prevent him from hiding his cousin Contorno, and he murdered several of the Corleonesi's associates such as Salvatore Zarcone and Pietro Messicati, until he was arrested by the Italian police alongside his cousin Salvatore Contorno.

While in prison he decided to become an informant for the state (pentito): he admitted all of his crimes, explaining to them in detail and revealing information that was previously unknown to prosecutors, including the dynamics of the Viale Lazio massacre, as Grado was one of the involved hitmen.
