= Calogero Bagarella =

Italian criminal and member of the Sicilian Mafia

Calogero Bagarella (Italian pronunciation: [kaˈlɔːdʒero baɡaˈrɛlla]; 14 January 1935 – 10 December 1969) was an Italian criminal and member of the Sicilian Mafia. He was from the town of Corleone and belonged to the Corleone Mafia family.

== Biography ==
Calogero Bagarella was born in Corleone to a family of Mafiosi that gave Cosa Nostra various affiliates. He was the second son of Salvatore Bagarella and Lucia Mondello, who moved to the town of Corleone after marriage. Salvatore Bagarella was sent to confinement in Northern Italy from 1963 to 1968 for Mafia-related crimes. His mother was forced to work from home to support the family, while the children went to school. As a boy, Calogero worked at a mill with his childhood friend Bernardo Provenzano.

From the second half of the 1950s, Calogero Bagarella became affiliated with the Corleonesi clan headed by the doctor, Michele Navarra, and was a lieutenant of Navarra's right-hand man Luciano Leggio, along with Bernardo Provenzano and Salvatore Riina. From 1958 to 1963, Bagarella fought in the internal clan war against his former boss, Michele Navarra.

On 10 December 1969, Bagarella was killed in an attack on Mafia boss Michele Cavataio, the boss of the Acquasanta quarter in the Viale Lazio in Palermo, known as the Viale Lazio massacre. He was part of a Mafia hit-squad consisting of Bernardo Provenzano, Emanuele D’Agostino, and Gaetano Grado of Stefano Bontade’s Santa Maria di Gesù Family and Damiano Caruso, a soldier of Giuseppe Di Cristina, the Mafia boss of Riesi.

== Books ==
- Jamieson, Alison (1999). The Antimafia: Italy's fight against organized crime. Palgrave Macmillan. ISBN 0-333-80158-X.
- Servadio, Gaia (1976), Mafioso. A history of the Mafia from its origins to the present day, London: Secker & Warburg ISBN 0-436-44700-2
- Stille, Alexander (1995). Excellent Cadavers. The Mafia and the Death of the First Italian Republic, New York: Vintage ISBN 0-09-959491-9
- (in Italian) Zingales, Leone (2001). Provenzano: il re di cosa nostra: la vera storia dell'ultimo "padrino", Cosenza: Pellegrini Editore ISBN 88-8101-099-2
