= Salvatore Riina =

Italian crime boss and member of the Sicilian Mafia

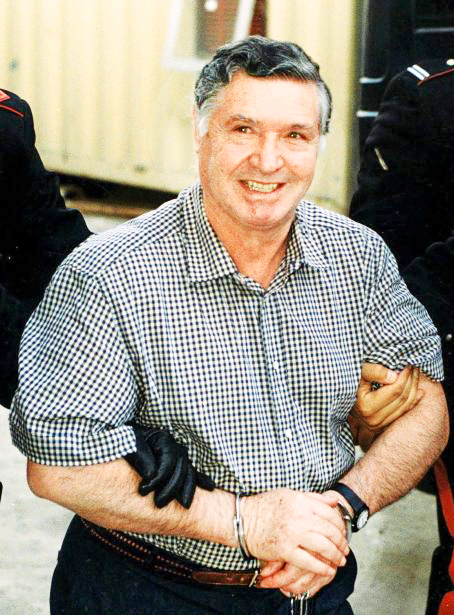
- Totò Riina after his arrest in 1993
- Born: 16 November 1930; Corleone, Sicily, Kingdom of Italy
- Died: 17 November 2017 (aged 87); Parma, Emilia-Romagna, Italy
- Other names: Totò 'u curtu (Totò the Short One); La Belva (The Beast) il Capo dei Capi (The Boss of the Bosses)
- Occupation: Mafia boss
- Spouse: Antonia Bagarella (m. 1974)
- Children: 4
- Relatives: Gaetano Riina, Leoluca Bagarella (brother-in-law)
- Status: Deceased (imprisoned from 1993)
- Allegiance: Corleone Mafia family Corleonesi
- Convictions: Mafia association Multiple murders
- Criminal charges: Mafia association Multiple murders
- Penalty: 26 terms of life imprisonment

Salvatore "Totò" Riina (Note: Italian pronunciation: [salvaˈtoːre (toˈtɔ r)riˈiːna].) (16 November 1930 – 17 November 2017) was an Italian mobster and boss of the Sicilian Mafia. He is known for a ruthless murder campaign that reached a peak in the early 1990s with the assassinations of Antimafia Commission prosecutors Giovanni Falcone and Paolo Borsellino, resulting in widespread public outcry, legal change and a major crackdown by the authorities. He was also known by the nicknames la Belva ('the beast') and il Capo dei Capi (Sicilian: 'u Capu dî Capi, 'the boss of bosses').

Riina succeeded Luciano Leggio as head of the Corleonesi criminal organisation in the mid-1970s and achieved dominance through a campaign of violence, which caused police to target his rivals. Riina had been a fugitive since the late 1960s after he was indicted on a murder charge. He was less vulnerable to law enforcement's reaction to his methods, as the policing removed many of the established chiefs who had traditionally sought influence through bribery. In violation of established Mafia codes, Riina advocated the killing of women and children and killed innocent members of the public solely to distract law enforcement agencies.

Hitman Giovanni Brusca estimated he murdered between 100 and 200 people on behalf of Riina. Although this scorched-earth policy neutralized any internal threat to Riina's position, he increasingly showed a lack of his earlier guile by bringing his organisation into open confrontation with the state. As part of the Maxi Trial of 1986, Riina was sentenced to life imprisonment in absentia for Mafia association and multiple murders. After 23 years of living as a fugitive, he was captured in 1993, provoking a series of indiscriminate bombings of art galleries and churches by his organisation. His lack of repentance subjected him to the stringent Article 41-bis prison regime until his death on 17 November 2017.

== Early life and career ==
Riina was born on 16 November 1930, and raised in a poverty-stricken countryside house in Corleone, in the then-province of Palermo. In September 1943, his father Giovanni found an unexploded American bomb and attempted to open it to sell the powder and metal, but in doing so, set it off, killing himself and Riina's seven-year-old brother Francesco, while injuring his other brother Gaetano. At the age of 19, Riina was sentenced to a 12-year prison sentence for having killed Domenico Di Matteo with a handgun in a fight; he was released in 1956.

The head of the Mafia family in Corleone was Michele Navarra until 6 August 1958, when he was shot dead by a trio of gunmen with submachine guns on the orders of Luciano Leggio, a ruthless 33-year-old Mafioso, who subsequently became the new boss. Together with Riina, Calogero Bagarella and Bernardo Provenzano (who were the three gunmen in Navarra's slaying), Leggio began to increase the power of the Corleonesi.

In the early 1960s, Leggio, Riina and Provenzano, who had spent the previous few years hunting down and killing dozens of Navarra's surviving supporters, were forced to go into hiding due to arrest warrants. Riina and Leggio were arrested and tried in 1969 for murders carried out earlier that decade. They were acquitted because of intimidation of the jurors and witnesses. Riina went into hiding later that year after he was indicted on a further murder charge and was to remain a fugitive for the next 23 years.

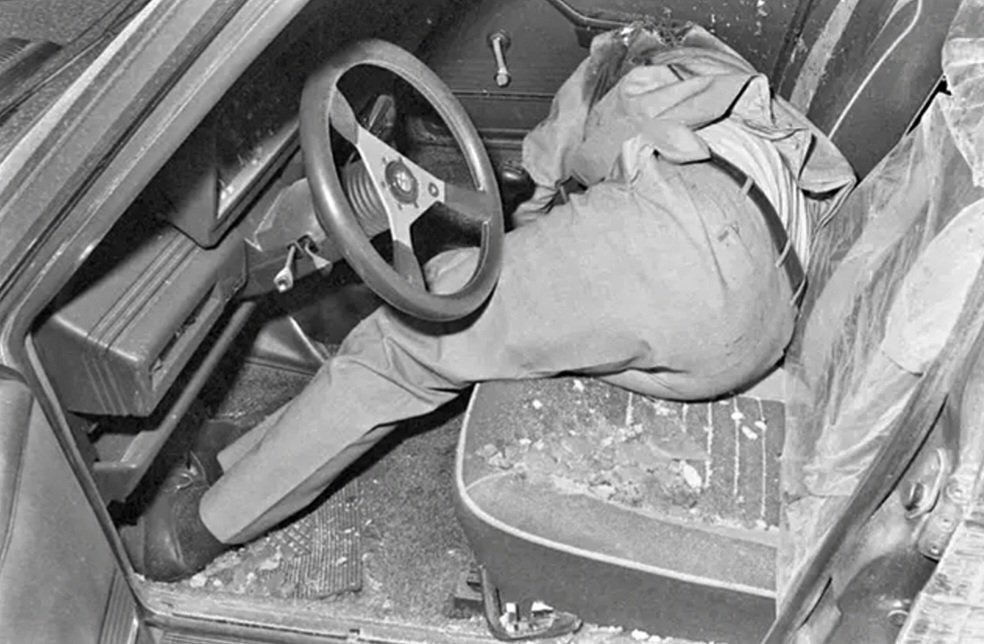
Stefano Bontade after he was shot to death with an AK-47 by Giuseppe Greco (23 April 1981)

On 16 May 1974, Leggio was captured and imprisoned for the 1958 murder of Navarra. Although Leggio retained some influence from behind bars, Riina was now the effective head of the Corleonesi. He also had close relations with the 'Ndrangheta, the Mafia-type association in Calabria. His compare d'anello (a kind of best man and trusted friend, typical of the Southern Italian tradition) at his wedding in 1974 was Domenico Tripodo, a powerful 'Ndrangheta boss and prolific cigarette smuggler.

The Corleonesi's primary rivals were Stefano Bontade, Salvatore Inzerillo and Tano Badalamenti, bosses of various powerful Palermo Mafia families. Bontade and Inzerillo's assassinations in 1981 by Riina's Corleonesi instigated a period of up to a thousand murders known as the Second Mafia War. By the end of the war, the Corleonesi were effectively ruling the Mafia, and over the next few years Riina increased his influence by eliminating the Corleonesi's allies, such as Filippo Marchese, Giuseppe Greco and Rosario Riccobono. In January 1981, Tommaso Buscetta fled to Brazil to escape the brewing Second Mafia War.

== Mafia leadership ==
=== Allegations of political influence ===
Prior to Riina's faction becoming the dominant force on the island, the Sicilian Mafia were based in Palermo, where they controlled large numbers of votes, enabling mutually beneficial relationships with local political figures such as mayors of Palermo Vito Ciancimino and Salvatore Lima. Ciancimino, who was born in Corleone, corruptly allowed untrammelled property development on the well-known valley known as the "Golden Bowl" (Conca d'Oro), amassing a vast fortune in the process. Lima granted a valuable monopoly concession on tax collection to Mafia businessman Ignazio Salvo, and was instrumental in Rome-based Giulio Andreotti becoming a force in national politics. In his turn, Salvo acted as financier to Andreotti.

These connections caused some to suspect that Riina had forged similar links with Andreotti, although the courts acquitted Andreotti of associations with the Mafia after 1980. Baldassare Di Maggio alleged that Riina met with the then Prime Minister Andreotti at Salvo's home in 1987 and greeted him with a "kiss of honour". Andreotti dismissed the charges against him as "lies and slander … the kiss of Riina, mafia summits … scenes out of a comic horror film". Veteran journalist Indro Montanelli doubted the claim, saying Andreotti "doesn't even kiss his own children". Di Maggio's credibility had been shaken in the closing weeks of the Andreotti trial, when he admitted killing a man while under state protection. Appellate court judges rejected Di Maggio's testimony.

=== Strategy of violence ===
The bodies of Pio La Torre and Rosario Di Salvo, murdered by the Mafia (30 April 1982)

Whereas his predecessors had kept a low profile, leading some in law enforcement to question the very existence of the Mafia, Riina ordered the murders of judges, policemen and prosecutors in an attempt to terrify the authorities. A law to create a new offence of Mafia association and confiscate Mafia assets was introduced by Pio La Torre, secretary of the Italian Communist Party in Sicily, but it had been stalled in parliament for two years. La Torre was murdered on 30 April 1982. In May 1982, the Italian government sent Carlo Alberto Dalla Chiesa, a general of the Italian Carabinieri, to Sicily with orders to crush the Mafia. However, not long after arriving, on the evening of 3 September 1982, he was gunned down in a drive-by shooting in the city centre with his wife, Emanuela Setti Carraro, and his police escort, Domenico Russo. In response to public disquiet about the failure to effectively combat the organisation Riina headed, La Torre's law was passed ten days later.

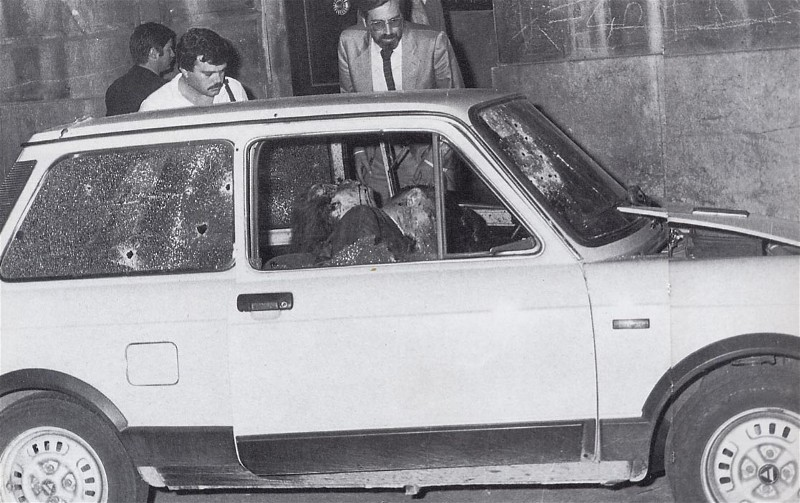
The bodies of Carlo Alberto dalla Chiesa and his wife Emanuela Setti Carraro (3 September 1982)

On 11 September 1982, Buscetta's two sons from his first wife, Benedetto and Antonio, disappeared, never to be found again, which prompted his collaboration with Italian authorities. This was followed by the deaths of his brother Vincenzo, son-in-law Giuseppe Genova, brother-in-law Pietro and four of his nephews, Domenico and Benedetto Buscetta, and Orazio and Antonio D'Amico. Buscetta was arrested in São Paulo, Brazil once again on 23 October 1983, and extradited to Italy on 15 July 1984. Buscetta asked to talk to the anti-Mafia judge Giovanni Falcone, and began his life as an informant, referred to as a pentito.

==== Christmas Massacre ====
Buscetta was the first high-profile Sicilian Mafioso to become an informant. He revealed that the Mafia was a single organisation led by a Commission, or Cupola (Dome), thereby establishing that the top tier of Mafia members were complicit in all the organisation's crimes. Buscetta helped judges Falcone and Paolo Borsellino achieve significant success in the fight against organized crime that led to 475 Mafia members indicted, and 338 convicted in the Maxi Trial.

In an attempt to divert investigative resources away from Buscetta's key revelations, Riina ordered a terrorist-style atrocity in the form of the 23 December 1984 Train 904 bombing; 17 people were killed and 267 wounded in the Apennine Base Tunnel. It became known as the "Christmas Massacre" (Strage di Natale) and was initially attributed to political extremists. It was only several years later, when police stumbled on explosives of the same type as used in Train 904, while searching the hideout of Giuseppe Calò, that it became apparent that the Mafia had been behind the attack.

==== Assassination of Falcone and Borsellino ====
As part of the Maxi Trial, Riina was given two life sentences in absentia. Riina pinned his prospects on the lengthy appeal process that had frequently set convicted mafiosi free, and he suspended the campaign of murders against officials while the cases went to higher courts. When the convictions were upheld by the Supreme Court of Cassation On 30 January 1992, the council of top bosses headed by Riina reacted by ordering the assassination of Salvatore Lima (on the grounds that he was an ally of Giulio Andreotti), and Giovanni Falcone.

On 23 May 1992, Falcone, his wife Francesca Morvillo and three police officers died in the Capaci bombing on highway A29 outside Palermo. Two months later, Borsellino was killed along with five police officers in the entrance to his mother's apartment block by a car bomb in via D'Amelio. Both attacks were ordered by Riina. Ignazio Salvo, who had advised Riina against killing Falcone, was himself murdered on 17 September 1992. The public was outraged, both at the Mafia and also the politicians who they felt had failed to adequately protect Falcone and Borsellino. The Italian government arranged for a massive crackdown against the Mafia in response. Riina was given a life sentence for each of Falcone's and Borsellino's murders, in 1997 and 1999 respectively.

=== Claims of negotiations with the government ===
Giovanni Brusca later claimed that Riina had told him that after the assassination of Falcone, Riina had been in negotiations with the government. Former interior minister Nicola Mancino said this was not true. In July 2012, Mancino was ordered to stand trial on charges of withholding evidence about alleged 1992 talks between the Italian state and the Mafia. Some prosecutors have theorized that Borsellino's murder was connected to the alleged negotiations. In 1992, Carabinieri Colonel Mario Mori met with Vito Ciancimino, who was close to Riina's lieutenant Bernardo Provenzano. Mori was later investigated on suspicion of posing a danger to the state after it was alleged he had taken a list of Riina's demands that Ciancimino had passed on. Mori maintained his contacts with Ciancimino were aimed at combating the Mafia and catching Riina, and there had been no list. Mori also said Ciancimino had disclosed little beyond implicitly admitting he knew Mafia members, and that key meetings were after Borsellino's death.

== Capture ==
Riina reprimanded Balduccio Di Maggio, an ambitious mafioso who had left his wife and children for a mistress, telling him he would never be made a full boss. Knowing Riina would order the death of subordinates whom he considered unreliable, Di Maggio fled Sicily in 1992 and collaborated with the Carabinieri police after he was arrested on 8 January 1993 in Novara. On 11 January, Di Maggio returned to Sicily under the custody of the Carabinieri operative squad because he could recognize Riina, despite having been a fugitive since 1969. On 12 January, Di Maggio recognized a complex of villas located in via Bernini 54 in Palermo, where they assumed Riina lived. On 14 January, the Carabinieri special operational squad, led by Captain Sergio De Caprio (nicknamed "Capitano Ultimo"), began surveillance activity around the complex of villas in via Bernini, aboard a white undercover van (nicknamed "balena"). The same evening, De Caprio showed to Di Maggio the surveillance tape of that day, from which he recognized Riina's wife, Ninetta Bagarella, exiting with her children in a Volkswagen Golf driven by a bodyguard. On the morning of 15 January 1993, at 8:55 am, Di Maggio recognized Salvatore Riina exiting the housing complex in a grey Citroën Zx, driven by his driver, Salvatore Biondino. After that, De Caprio and his men followed the car, blocked it at a roundabout in viale della Regione Siciliana, and arrested Riina and Biondino.

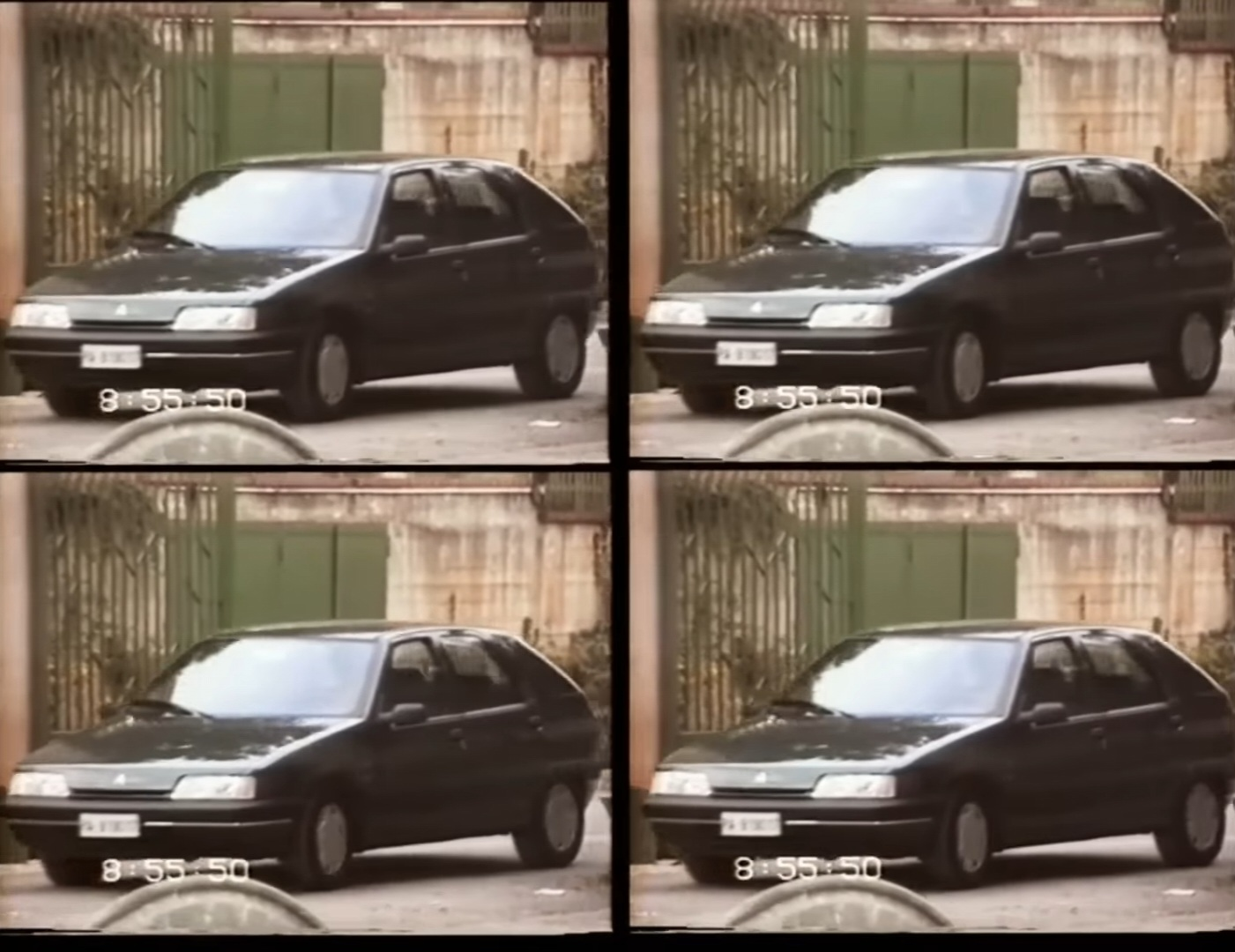
Surveillance footage of Toto Riina's car, taken while he was exiting the house complex where he lived, on the morning of 15 January 1993

=== Terror attacks ===
After Riina's capture, numerous terror attacks were ordered as a warning to its members to not turn state's witness (pentito), and in response to the overruling of the Article 41-bis prison regime. On 14 May 1993, television host Maurizio Costanzo, who had expressed delight at the arrest of Riina, was almost killed by a bomb as he drove down a Rome street; 23 people were injured. The explosion was part of a series. Less than a fortnight later, on 27 May, a bomb under the Torre dei Pulci in Florence killed five people: Fabrizio Nencini and his wife Angelamaria; their daughters, nine-year-old Nadia and two-month-old Caterina; and Dario Capolicchio, aged 20. Thirty-three people were injured.

Attacks on art galleries and churches left ten dead and many injured, causing outrage among Italians. Some investigators believed that most of those who carried out murders for Cosa Nostra answered solely to Leoluca Bagarella, and that consequently Bagarella actually wielded more power than Bernardo Provenzano, who was Riina's formal successor. Provenzano reportedly protested about the terroristic attacks, but Bagarella responded sarcastically, telling Provenzano to wear a sign saying "I don't have anything to do with the massacres".

=== Further controversies ===
Giovanni Brusca—‌one of Riina's hitmen who detonated the bomb that killed Falcone, and later became an informant after his 1996 arrest—‌has offered a controversial version of the capture of Riina: a secret deal between Carabinieri officers, secret agents and Cosa Nostra bosses tired of the dictatorship of the Corleonesi. According to Brusca, Provenzano sold Riina in exchange for the valuable archive of compromising material that Riina held in his house in Via Bernini 54, in Palermo.

The Carabinieri's ROS (Raggruppamento Operativo Speciale) persuaded the Palermo Public Prosecutor's Office not to immediately search Riina's house, and then abandoned surveillance of the house after six hours leaving it unprotected. The house was only raided 18 days later but it had been completely emptied. According to the Carabinieri commanders, the house was abandoned because they did not consider it to be important, and they never told the prosecutor to be willing to maintain the surveillance during the following days.

This version of Riina's arrest has been denied by Carabinieri commander, general Mario Mori (at the time deputy head of the ROS). Mori confirmed that channels of communication were opened with Cosa Nostra through Vito Ciancimino—‌a former mayor of Palermo convicted for Mafia association—‌who was close to the Corleonesi. To sound out the willingness of Mafiosi to talk, Ciancimino contacted Riina's private doctor, Antonino Cinà. When Ciancimino was informed that the goal was to arrest Riina, he seemed unwilling to continue. At this point, the arrest and cooperation of Balduccio Di Maggio led to the arrest of Riina. In 2006, the Palermo Court acquitted Mario Mori and Captain "Ultimo" (Sergio De Caprio)—‌the man who arrested Riina—‌of the charge of consciously aiding and abetting the Mafia.

According to an FBI memo revealed in 2007, leaders of New York's five Italian-American organized crime families voted in late 1986 on whether to issue a contract for the death of then-U.S. Attorney for the Southern District of New York Rudy Giuliani. Heads of the Lucchese, Bonanno, and Genovese families rejected the idea, though Colombo and Gambino leaders, Carmine Persico and John Gotti, supported it. In 2014, it was revealed by former Sicilian Mafia member and informant, Rosario Naimo, that Riina had ordered a murder contract on Giuliani during the mid-1980s. Riina allegedly was suspicious of Giuliani's efforts to prosecute the American Mafia and was worried that he might have spoken with Italian anti-mafia prosecutors and politicians, including Giovanni Falcone and Paolo Borsellino, whose separate car bombing murders in 1992 were orchestrated by Riina. According to Giuliani, the Sicilian Mafia offered $800,000 for his death during his first year as mayor of New York in 1994.

Massimo Ciancimino, son of Vito Ciancimino, said in November 2009 that it was Provenzano who betrayed the whereabouts of Riina. Police sent maps of Palermo to Vito Ciancimino, one of which was then forwarded to Provenzano, at the time a Mafia fugitive. Ciancimino said the map was returned by Provenzano, marked with the precise location of Riina's hiding place.

=== Prison ===
Riina was held in a maximum-security prison in Parma with limited contact with the outside world in order to prevent him from running his organization from behind bars. Riina's assets were confiscated and his vast mansion acquired by the anti-Mafia mayor of Corleone in 1997; in 2015 the former mansion was converted into a police headquarters. In total, Riina was given 26 life sentences, and served almost all of his time—‌from his capture in January 1993 until his death in November 2017—‌under strict isolation.

In mid-March 2003, Riina underwent surgery for heart problems and in May of the same year he was admitted to a hospital in Ascoli Piceno due to a heart attack. Later that September, he was again hospitalized for heart problems. In 2006, he was transferred to the Opera prison in Milan and, again due to heart problems, was admitted to the San Paolo hospital in Milan. On 4 March 2014, he was hospitalized again. On 31 August 2014, newspapers reported that in November of the previous year, Riina was making threats against Luigi Ciotti. In 2017, Riina's lawyers applied to the Bologna Surveillance Court for the deferral of his sentence to house arrest, submitting Riina's precarious state of health as the reason. On 19 July, the Tribunal denied this request.

== List of trials ==
- In 1987, in the Maxi Trial, Riina was sentenced in absentia to life imprisonment together with Bernardo Provenzano and 17 other mob bosses.
- In 1992, he was sentenced in absentia to life imprisonment together with Francesco Madonia, for the murder of police captain Emanuele Basile.
- In 1993, he was sentenced to life imprisonment for ordering the 1989 murders of the boss Vincenzo Puccio and his brother Pietro.
- In 1994, he was sentenced to another life sentence for the murder of Pietro Buscetta, brother-in-law of pentito Tommaso Buscetta.
- In 1995, he was sentenced to another life sentence for the murder of Lieutenant Colonel Giuseppe Russo, together with Bernardo Provenzano, Michele Greco and Leoluca Bagarella.
- The same year, he was sentenced to life imprisonment for the murders of commissioners Giuseppe Montana and Ninni Cassarà, together with Michele Greco, Bernardo Brusca, Francesco Madonia and Bernardo Provenzano.
- The same year, he was sentenced to life imprisonment for the murders of Piersanti Mattarella, Pio La Torre, Rosario di Salvo and Michele Reina, together with Michele Greco, Bernardo Brusca, Bernardo Provenzano, Giuseppe Calò, Francesco Madonia and Nenè Geraci.
- In 1995, in the trial for the murder of General Carlo Alberto Dalla Chiesa, Boris Giuliano, and Paolo Giaccone, Riina was sentenced to life imprisonment together with Bernardo Provenzano, Giuseppe Calò, Bernardo Brusca, Francesco Madonia, Nenè Geraci and Francesco Spadaro.
- In 1996, he was again sentenced to life imprisonment for the murder of Judge Antonino Scopelliti together with the bosses Giuseppe Calò, Francesco Madonia, Giuseppe Giacomo Gambino, Giuseppe Lucchese, Bernardo Brusca, Salvatore Montalto, Salvatore Buscemi, Nenè Geraci and Pietro Aglieri.
- In 1997, in the trial for the Capaci bombing in which judge Giovanni Falcone, his wife Francesca Morvillo, their escort Antonio Montinaro, Vito Schifani, and Rocco Di Cillo lost their lives, Riina was sentenced to life imprisonment together with bosses Bernardo Provenzano, Pietro Aglieri, Bernardo Brusca, Giuseppe Calò, Raffaele Ganci, Nenè Geraci, Benedetto Spera, Nitto Santapaola, Salvatore Montalto, Giuseppe Graviano, and Matteo Motisi.
- The same year, in the trial for the murder of Judge Cesare Terranova, Riina received another life sentence along with Michele Greco, Bernardo Brusca, Giuseppe Calò, Nenè Geraci, Francesco Madonia and Bernardo Provenzano.
- In 1998, he was sentenced to life imprisonment together with the boss Mariano Agate for the murder of judge Giangiacomo Ciaccio Montalto.
- The same year, in the trial for the murder of the politician Salvo Lima, he was sentenced to life imprisonment together with Francesco Madonia, Bernardo Brusca, Giuseppe Calò, Giuseppe Graviano, Pietro Aglieri, Salvatore Montalto, Giuseppe Montalto, Salvatore Buscemi, Nenè Geraci, Raffaele Ganci, Giuseppe Farinella, Benedetto Spera, Antonino Giuffrè, Salvatore Biondino, Michelangelo La Barbera, Simone Scalici, while Salvatore Cancemi and Giovanni Brusca were sentenced to 18 years in prison and the collaborators of Justice Francesco Onorato and Giovan Battista Ferrante (who confessed to the crime) were sentenced to 13 years as material perpetrators of the ambush. In 2003, the Cassation annulled the sentence to life imprisonment for Pietro Aglieri, Giuseppe Farinella, Giuseppe Graviano and Benedetto Spera.
- The same year, Riina was sentenced to life imprisonment together with Pippo Calò, Raffaele Ganci, Vincenzo Buccafusca and Giovanni Di Giacomo for the murders of the mafiosi Domenico Balducci and Giovanbattista Brusca, which took place in Rome in 1981.
- In 1999, he was sentenced to life imprisonment as principal for the Via D'Amelio massacre, in which the judge Paolo Borsellino and five of his escorts lost their lives (Emanuela Loi, Agostino Catalano, Vincenzo Li Muli, Walter Eddie Cosina and Claudio Traina), together with Pietro Aglieri, Salvatore Biondino, Carlo Greco, Giuseppe Graviano, Gaetano Scotto and Francesco Tagliavia who were also sentenced to life imprisonment.
- In 2000, he was sentenced to life imprisonment together with Giuseppe Graviano, Leoluca Bagarella and Bernardo Provenzano for the 1993 bombings including Via dei Georgofili, in Florence.
- In 2002, he was sentenced to life imprisonment for the murder of judge Alberto Giacomelli.
- The same year, he was sentenced to life imprisonment for the murder of judge Rocco Chinnici together with the bosses Bernardo Provenzano, Raffaele Ganci, Antonino Madonia, Salvatore Buscemi, Nenè Geraci, Giuseppe Calò, Francesco Madonia, Salvatore and Giuseppe Montalto, Stefano Ganci and Vincenzo Galatolo.
- The same year, he was sentenced to life imprisonment together with Vincenzo Virga for the Pizzolungo massacre, in which Barbara Rizzo and her six-year-old twin sons, Salvatore and Giuseppe Asta, died.
- In 2009, he received another life sentence together with Bernardo Provenzano for the Viale Lazio massacre and the death of Michele Cavataio.
- In 2010, he was given another life sentence, together with Giuseppe Madonia, Gaetano Leonardo and Giacomo Sollami, for the murder of Giovanni Mungiovino, a politician who opposed the Corleonesi mafia, killed in 1983, Giuseppe Cammarata, killed in 1989, and Salvatore Saitta, killed in 1992.
- The same year, he was sentenced to life imprisonment together with Bernando Provenzano and Giuseppe Calò over the San Giovanni Gemini massacre during the Second Mafia War, when gunmen acting on Riina's orders killed the Mafia boss Gigino Pizzuto as well as two innocent bystanders, Michele Ciminnisi and Vincenzo Romano.
- In 2012, he was given another life sentence for the 1992 murder of Alfio Trovato in Milan.

== Marriage and family ==
Salvatore Riina married Antonietta Bagarella (sister of Calogero and Leoluca Bagarella) in 1974, and they had four children—‌two sons and two daughters. His sons, Giovanni and Giuseppe, followed in their father's footsteps and were imprisoned. In November 2001, a court in Palermo sentenced 24-year-old Giovanni to life in prison for four murders. He had been in police custody since 1997. According to Antonio Ingroia, one of the prosecutors of the Direzione distrettuale antimafia (DDA) of Palermo, Giovanni is among the possible leading figures in the Sicilian Cosa Nostra after the arrest of Provenzano in 2006 and Salvatore Lo Piccolo in 2007, but still too young to be recognized as the leading boss of the organisation.

On 31 December 2004, Riina's youngest son, Giuseppe, one of those taken into custody in June 2002, was sentenced to 14 years for various crimes, including Mafia association, extortion and money laundering. He was found to have established Mafia-controlled companies to hide money from protection rackets, drug-trafficking and tenders for public building contracts on the island. In 2006, the council of Corleone created T-shirts reading I love Corleone in an attempt to dissociate the town from its infamous Mafiosi, but a brother-in-law of one of Riina's daughters began an attempt to sue the Corleone mayor by claiming the Riina family owned the copyright to the phrase.

== Death ==
Riina died on 17 November 2017, one day after his 87th birthday, while in a medically induced coma after two operations in the prison unit of the Maggiore Hospital in Parma. The specific cause of death was not revealed. At the time of his death, he was still considered to be the head of the Cosa Nostra according to anti-Mafia prosecutor Franco Roberti and former Palermo anti-Mafia magistrate Alfonso Sabella. Riina was refused a public funeral by the church and Archbishop Michele Pennisi; he was privately buried in his hometown of Corleone.

== In popular culture ==
- Ultimo, a 1998 TV miniseries by Stefano Reali, inspired by the 1995 book by Maurizio Torrealta, Ultimo – Il capitano che arrestò Totò Riina In this film, the character of Salvatore Partanna, Mafia boss inspired by Riina, is played by Victor Cavallo;
- Excellent Cadavers, a 1999 film by Ricky Tognazzi. Riina is played again by Victor Cavallo;
- Il capo dei capi, a 2007 TV movie directed by Alexis Sweet and Enzo Monteleone. A TV series about Totò Riina: Corleone is the English subtitled version, with trailer.
- L'ultimo dei Corleonesi, a 2007 TV film, directed by Alberto Negrin, where he is played by Marcello Mazzarella
- Il Divo, a 2008 film by Paolo Sorrentino where Riina is played by Enzo Rai
- The Mafia Kills Only in Summer (film), a 2013 film by Pif where Riina is played by Antonio Alveario
- Boris Giuliano – Un poliziotto a Palermo, a 2016 TV miniseries by Ricky Tognazzi where Riina is played by Alfredo Lo Bianco
- The Mafia Kills Only in Summer (TV series), TV series of 2016 by Luca Ribuoli where Riina is played by Domenico Centamore
- The Traitor, film of 2019 by Marco Bellocchio where Riina is played by Nicola Calì

In 2009, it was reported that Riina and Provenzano had fan clubs set up on their behalf on Facebook, including "Totò Riina, the Real Boss of Bosses" and "Fans of Totò Riina, a Misunderstood Man". Rita Borsellino, sister of Sicilian Mafia victim Paolo Borsellino, was one of a number of high-profile Italians who condemned the idolization of Mafiosi, comparing the sites to those that "laud Hitler or Nazism".

== Bibliography ==
- Dickie, John (2004). Cosa Nostra: A History of the Sicilian Mafia. London: Hodder & Stoughton. ISBN 0-340-82434-4.
- Follain, John (2012). Vendetta: The Mafia, Judge Falcone and the Quest for Justice, London: Hodder & Stoughton, ISBN 978-1-444-71411-1
- Jamieson, Alison (1999). The Antimafia: Italy's Fight Against Organized Crime. Houndmills, Basingstoke: Macmillan. ISBN 0-333-71900-X.
- Lodato, Saverio (1999). Ho ucciso Giovanni Falcone: la confessione di Giovanni Brusca, Milan: Mondadori ISBN 88-04-45048-7 (in Italian)
- Schneider, Jane T. & Peter T. Schneider (2003). Reversible Destiny: Mafia, Antimafia, and the Struggle for Palermo, Berkeley: University of California Press ISBN 0-520-23609-2
- Stille, Alexander (1995). Excellent Cadavers: The Mafia and the Death of the First Italian Republic. London: Jonathan Cape. ISBN 0-224-03761-7.
- Salvo Riina (1 April 2016). Riina : family life: authorised biography. Linea controcorrente (1st ed.). Villorba, Italy: Anordest. ISBN 9788898651481. OCLC 935918403.
