= Girolamo Caruso =

Agronomist from Italy

Girolamo Caruso (18 September 1842, Alcamo, province of Trapani – 2 January 1923, Pisa), was an Italian agronomist, university teacher and scientist.

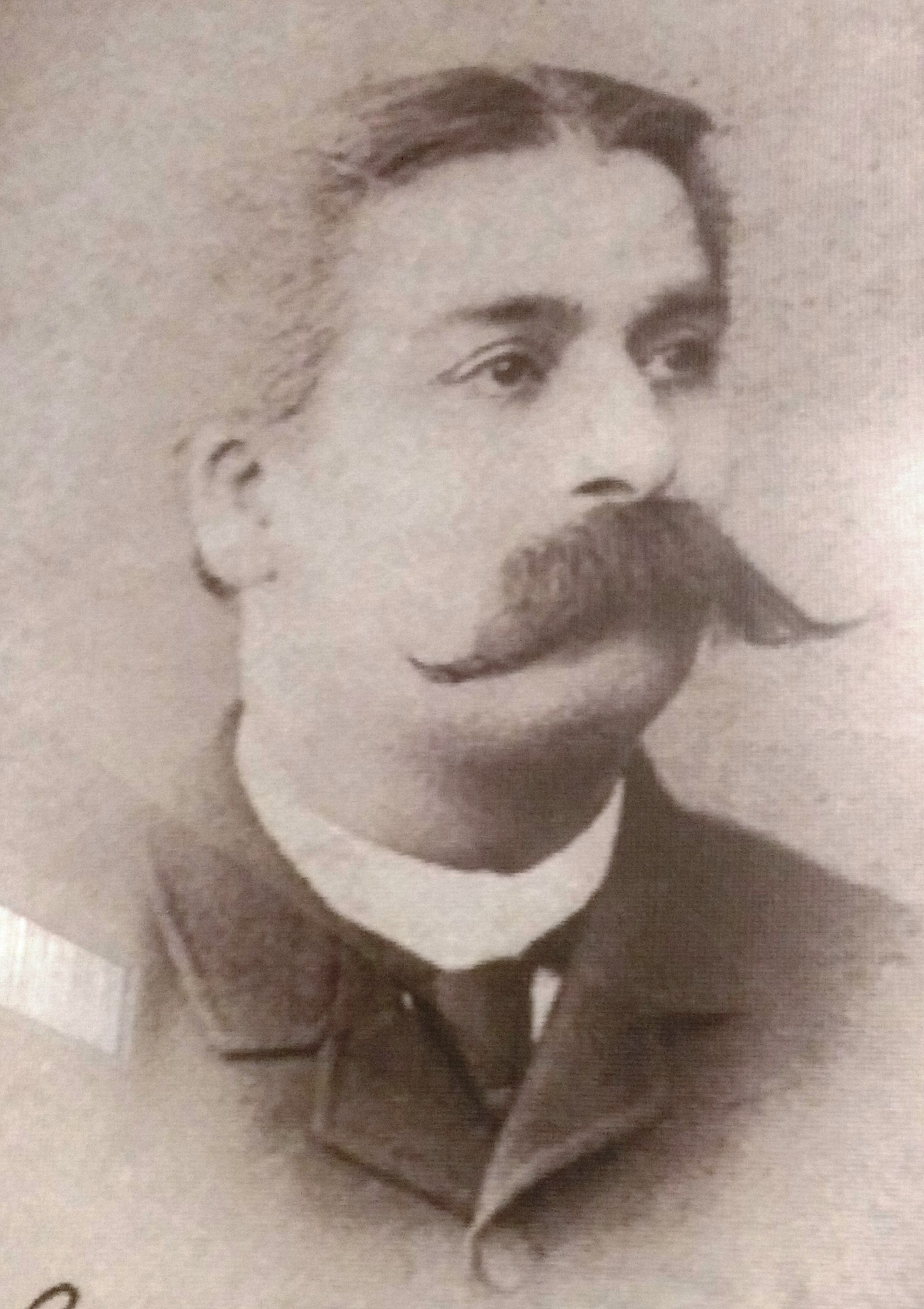
Girolamo Caruso

== Biography ==
He was born in Alcamo and graduated in Agriculture at the University of Naples in 1861. After spending some years in the army, first as a volunteer and later as commissioner of Military engineering, in 1864 he was appointed as teacher of agriculture at the agrarian provincial school of Corleone (Palermo), and its director until 1867, when he moved to Messina to teach at the Technical Institute.

In 1862, aged only 20, Caruso started to deal with crop rotation, nearly unknown in that period and, the following year, with reforestation of slopes and the creation of drainage basins to collect the waters to be used as power to irrigate the fields.

In those years he devoted himself to some research on agriculture in Sicily (on the gommosis of citrus trees, on viticulture and vinification, on olive growing) and got a great success with his work L'industria dei cereali in Sicilia e le popolazioni che la esercitano (Palermo 1870); in this book, besides describing the agrarian techniques and machines, there were useful suggestions. Caruso recommended the system "a quinqueria" for the crop rotation (as in Sicilian manor farms), and indicated the agricultural tools available on the market.

In 1871, after winning a competitive examination for a professorship, he obtained the post as agronomy teacher (following Pietro Cuppari) and director of the Agrarian Institute at the University of Pisa, where he settled definitively; he had then different and important offices, above all by the Government.

Thanks to his skilful guide, the Scuola Superiore di Agraria of Pisa became one of the most important institutes in its field and a pole of reference for Italian agriculture: the pupils coming out from it could apply, continue and extend, in Italy and abroad, the knowledge acquired and Caruso's works.

In 1872 he founded the Agrarian Comitium of Pisa which he presided over until 1919; Caruso used the work in the Comitium in close relationship with that of the university, promoting initiatives and debates in order to urge the competent authorities to improve the legislation for the agricultural field, or agrarian updating courses, exhibitions and meetings in order to stimulate the application of modern techniques.

In 1873, he presented an important introductory report about I sistemi di amministrazione rurale e la questione sociale; in 1875, he founded the magazine L'agricoltura italiana, which he ran until 1922 and had the purpose of divulging the innovations in the agricultural field and forming modern agronomists. The same year, he took part in the fourth general congress of Italian farmers in Ferrara, where he presented the report: Sull'ordinamento dell'istruzione agraria.

Caruso's thought is particularly evident in the introduction to his famous manual Agronomy, published in 1898 and used for many years in Italian universities, in which he affirmed: Italian agriculture is an art that you can practise empirically or according to the rules given by science; so there is an empirical agriculture and a rational one.

In the book, he treated important subjects: irrigation, land development, soil management, and the study of tillage tools; inside it, there are also 263 printmakings depicting all the aspects of the agricultural environment and of cultivations. The schemes of the hydraulic-agrarian management, published in Caruso's book, are in all the university texts of Agronomy which have been edited until now; besides, the nitrogen fertilisation and irrigation are examined by linking theory to methods of calculation in a very modern way.

Superannuated from teaching in 1917, Girolamo Caruso died in Pisa on 2 January 1923.

On 12 November 1925, in the lecture room of Agronomy of Istituto superiore agrario of Pisa, they placed a marble bust of Girolamo Caruso, carved by Giuseppe Michelotti, similar to those of Cosimo Ridolfi and Pietro Cuppari, wanted by Caruso himself.

Alcamo, his native town, has remembered him by entitling him a street and the homonymous Technical Institute (now ITET).

== The problem of the mezzadria system in Italy ==
In 1873, in one of his introductory reports, Caruso put in evidence the social, economic, and productive implications of the mezzadria (called metayage in English): first of all it had to exist, from the economic point of view, for the relationship that created between the farmer family and the land, that made possible the increase and sorting of the rural population even in far and less accessible areas, in addition to the growth of the quantity of work.

According to him, however, the main reason for the convenience of this system was not the economic one, but the social one: connecting with the theory dear to Raffaello Lambruschini, Gino Capponi, and Bettino Ricasoli, he remarked the clear juxtaposition between the peaceful sharecroppers, "who loved order, property, family, laws", and the social dangerousness of day labourers.

== Research ==
When he started his university teaching, the modern mechanical tools for employment in the fields started to proliferate; besides getting interested in the study of all the main types existing at that time, Caruso also examined the economic results. His interest was also for the problems of a company structure and management, (with his Ricerche sull'ordinamento dell'azienda rurale, edited in Florence in 1894), and with the essay Sulla convenienza e sull'attuabilità del disegno di riforma agraria (in Atti della Accademia dei Georgofili, s. 4, Disp. 1, XXIII [1900], pp. 69–95).

He made memorable experiments on the mechanic threshing, on the new steam-powered oil mills, on the reaper-binder Aultmann, on the mowers Johnson e Aultmann, on the seed drill Cosimini, on the shelling machine Navacchi and machine press Blunt for conservation of forage into silos.

As regards tillage work he experienced the new types of plough Sack and Oliver, and the new systems of steam-powered ploughing, evaluating the working depth, the strength of mechanical traction and the methods of execution on level and slope.

Girolamo Caruso was one of the first people to experience the chemical fertilisation, first of all on wheat, and to appraise its efficacy; the first part of these experiences was published in 1888. In 1890 he determined the method for the calculation of the quantity of manure to be supplied, by using that method (today called the method of weighing) and affirming the necessity of the anticipation of the fertilizing elements, which was a complete innovation at that time.

His constant activity of research is testified by his several notes presented at Accademia dei Georgofili and the essays published on l'Agricoltura italiana about viticulture and vinification (in 1878, 1892 and 1898); forages (1891); manures (1889, 1890, 1906, 1909); parasites of plants (1888–90, 1894–1897, 1902, 1915); olive growing; mechanised agriculture (1876, 1883, 1897). Besides, as he had known intuitively the importance of the type of manure used for soil, he studied and described, in detail, all the new fertilisers being produced, by putting them in comparison with those which were in use.

In 1878, Caruso, being sure that the climatic conditions were responsible for the result of cultivations, set up a little weather station and since 1886 he daily published the detected meteorological data on the magazine L'Agricoltura Italiana.

His scientific activity is documented by more than a hundred important publications; most of them are included in Atti della Regia Accademia dei Georgofili, and, more specifically, in the valuable magazine "L'Agricoltura italiana", founded by him in 1875 and directed for the rest of his life.

Girolamo Caruso was interested, above all, in the cultivation of wheat: he examined harvesting and sowing methods, fertilising, pest management and cost of production. Under his guidance, the Institute got a high experience in this field, so that in 1925 they founded the Regional Institute for Cereal Growing, within the Agrarian High Institute (that is Istituto superiore agrario) of Pisa.

In 1891 Nazareno Strampelli, the most important genetist agronomist of the first half of the 20th century who produced new varieties of wheat, got his degree at the University of Pisa. He has the merit of having made possible the first green revolution, which is an improvement of the production capacity that made the Italian population self-sufficient.

Caruso also dedicated his studies to the cultivation of grapevine, and above all, to some kinds in the country Pisan, to green pruning, to the cultivation of vine without support, and to graftings on American cuttings to fight phylloxera.

Many of his studies included the fight against parasites, above all those of the vine and olive; until the first half of the 19th century, Italian vines were unaffected by parasites, but in 1851 powdery mildew arrived, in 1878 Phylloxera and in 1879 downy mildew.

Girolamo Caruso made some experiments on all systems of the fight against these parasites and engaged for their application in Tuscany and in Italy; besides, he carried forward different experiences on the methods of fight against click beetles of cereals, the grapevine moth, the olive fruit fly, la tingidae of pears, the insects harmful for the seeds in the granaries, the smallpox olive and morus-mildew.

Besides his studies of agronomy, he was rather interested in rural economy: on the production costs in the area of Pisa, in the usefulness of the manuring of olives with pomace, in the tests of manuring and cultural operations of wheat, the set of rules about farms, convenience and feasibility of the bill of land reform proposed by Maggiorino Ferraris and the legislation about the credit for land improvements and agrarian progress in general.

=== Activities ===
1864 Professor of agriculture at the provincial agrarian school of Corleone (Palermo)

1867 Teacher of rural economy and agricultural evaluations at the Technical Institute of Messina

1871 Chair of agronomy, agriculture and rural economy at the university of Pisa

1872 Appointment of Director of the Agrarian School and the Agrarian Institute of Pisa, he founded the agrarian Comitium of Pisa

1873 Presents the report I sistemi di amministrazione rurale e la questione sociale (Pisa 1874)

1874 Founds the magazine L'agricoltura italiana

1875 Takes part in the Fourth General Congress of Italian farmers at Ferrara, doing a report on the organisation of agricultural instruction

1878 Sets up three schools of Oenology in Piedmont, at Avellino and Catania, realizing the program of Vocational Training that the Ministry of Public Education had promoted

1890 Gives a contribution to the foundation of a cooperative trade union in Pisa

1880–1990 Does his best for the reorganisation of the Scuola Superiore and the Agrarian Institute

1894 Member emeritus of Accademia dei Georgofili of Florence, Caruso is associated to other various academies

1894 Member of the Committee promoting the Society of Italian farmers, later founded in Rome in 1895, and elected Councillor

1907 The agrarian Comitium of Pisa makes a special foundation entitled to Caruso for the actions intended for the progress of agriculture Pisan.

1914 Presides over the commission for the referendum of the agrarian Comitoums on their reorganisation

- Member of the Royal Academy of Agriculture of Turin
- Honorary member of the Academy of Sciences, Letters and Arts of Verona.
- Board of Governors of Agriculture
- Board of Governors of Work
- Board of Governors of Public Education
- Departmental Council of Traffic

It is also noteworthy his precious activity for the ordering of secondary schools, technical institutes, agrarian special and practical schools, etc.

=== Works ===
- Apolessia linfatica o mal doi gomma degli agrumi; 1864
- Trattato di viticoltura e vinificazione, 1869
- Trattato sulla coltivazione degli ulivi e la manifattura dell'olio, 1870
- Studi sull'industria dei cereali in Sicilia e sulle popolazioni che la esercitano; Palermo, 1870)
- Questioni urgenti di viticoltura; Messina, tip. Ignazio d'Amico e figli, 1871
- I sistemi di amministrazione rurale e la questione sociale; Pisa 1874
- Relazione introduttiva su: I sistemi di amministrazione rurale e la questione sociale; Pisa, 1874
- Monografia del bergamotto in L'Agricoltura Italiana (vol. I) Firenze, M.Ricci, 1874
- Dell' Olivo: Monografia; Torino, Unione tipografico-editrice, 1883. Considerata il suo capolavoro, tratta della distribuzione geografica della pianta, delle varietà coltivate, del clima, del terreno, della concimazione, dell'impianto dell'oliveto e delle malattie che più di frequente lo colpiscono.
- Dell' Olivo: Monografia, 2010
- Esperimenti fatti colla mietitrice-legatrice Aultman nei poderi della R. scuola superiore agraria di Pisa;Firenze: Tip. M.Ricci, 1888
- Esperienze colla mietitrice legatrice Aultman; Firenze, Tip. di Mariano Ricci, 1889.
- Dei Concimi chimici adoperati in copertura nella coltivazione del grano (2^serie); Firenze, M.Ricci,1889
- Le prove di concimazione e i conti colturali del grano, in "L'Agricoltura Italiana",16; 1890
- Esperienze sulla conservazione dei foraggi freschi colla pressa Blunt: memoria letta alla R. Accademia dei Georgofili nell'adunanza del dì 3 maggio 1891; Firenze, M. Cellini e C., 1891
- Ricerche sull'ordinamento dell'azienda rurale; Firenze; 1894
- Osservazioni e ricerche sperimentali sull'uso dei fermenti puri selezionati nella vinificazione di Girolamo Caruso e Gustavo Gasperini, in "Atti della Reale Accademia dei Georgofili di Firenze", s. IV, 21; 1898
- Agronomia, manuale; Torino, Unione Tipografica Editrice, 1898
- Sulla convenienza e sull'attuabilità del disegno di riforma agraria (in Atti della Accademia dei Georgofili, s. 4, Disp. 1, XXIII [1900], pp. 69–95),1900
- saggi pubblicati sull'Agricoltura italiana relativi alla viticultura e alla vinificazione (1878, 1892, 1898); ai foraggi (1891); ai concimi (1889, 1890, 1906, 1909); ai parassiti delle piante (1888–90, 1894–1897, 1902, 1915); alla meccanica agraria (1876, 1883, 1897).

== See also ==
- Alcamo
- Violette Impellizzeri
- Cosimo Ridolfi
- Nazareno Strampelli
- Agriculture
- agronomy
- Oenology

== Sources ==
- Onoranze al Professore G. C. nel XXXV anno d'insegnamento universitario, Pisa 1907, che contiene anche l'elenco completo delle opere del C. fino a quell'anno.
- La migliore fonte di informazioni sulla vita e le opere del C. è rappres. dal volume delle Onoranze alla memoria del Prof. G.C., Pisa 1926.
- G. Bolla in Atti dell'Accademia dei Georgofili, s. 5, XX (1923), pp. XLVII-L e di
- N. Passerini, in Annuario della R. Univer. di Pisa, della R. Scuola di ingegn. e dei RR. Istituti superiori di agraria e di medicina veterin. di Pisa per l'anno accademico 1923–14, pp. 339–42
- A. J. Worland, The importance of Italian wheats to worldwide varietal improvement, "Journal of Genetics and Breeding", 53 (1999), p. 165-173.
