= Traditional Italian maize varieties =

Traditional Italian maize varieties have been, according to historical, archaeological, botany, morphological, and genetic evidence, molded since the introduction of this exotic cereal crop from the Americas in the sixteenth century.

== History ==
The speciation and evolution of maize varieties in Italy, by means of man-made adaptive selection, maintained a broad genetic variability for about four centuries. Traditional varieties and ecotypes were sown in the diversified ecological regions of Italy until the introduction of Corn Belt hybrids in the twentieth century presented outstanding ecological adaptation, yield and cooking characteristics.

Most Italian agro-ecotypes of maize are from the Indurata and Indentata sections and their combinations, characterized by kernels with flint, semi-dent and dent consistency. A few local varieties from the Everta section (pop-corn) were also grown in Italy. The kernel apex can take different shapes: smooth, horned, cuspidate, rostrum-like or indented.

The eco-agronomic characteristics of Italian traditional varieties match the Mediterranean and semi-continental climate of the country, with mostly spring and some summer (post-wheat) sowings; and early (summer) to late (autumn) maturity.

== Classification ==
Classification, along the plant cropping and grain cooking characteristics, is summed in the following ear types;

- Eight-rows (ottofile),
- Large conic
- Long-ear cylindric,
- Polirows-subconic,
- Short-cycle dwarf conic.

An early description of 12 maize varieties was published by P. Venino in 1916, followed by extensive studies by Tito Vezio Zapparoli between 1920 and 1943. An extensive collection of 562 seed samples of local varieties was collected in 1954-1955 by Aureliano Brandolini.

The agronomic, morphological and cytological characterization, and multi-variate analysis, of such and other accessions stored at the germplasm bank of the "Maize experimental station" in Bergamo, allowed the systematic classification of Italian traditional varieties.

According to such classification, Italian traditional maize varieties are:

- Sections Indurata and Indentata (9 racial complexes, 35 races & 65 agro-ecotypes)
  - Eight-rowed flints and derived races: 6 races and 10 agro-ecotypes
    - Ottofile puri (true eight-rows)
      - Ottofile
      - Ottofile tardivo
      - Tajolone
    - Razze derivate (derivative races)
      - Cannellino
      - Derivati 12-14 file
      - Monachello
  - Conical flints and derived races: 5 races and 15 agro-ecotypes
    - Barbina
    - Biancone
    - Montano
    - Ostesa
    - Poliranghi
  - Late Southern cylindrical flints: 3 races and 4 agro-ecotypes
    - Montoro
    - Pannaro
    - Rodindia
  - Midseason Southern cylindrical flints: 3 races and 6 agro-ecotypes
    - Altosiculo
    - Dindico
    - Trentinella
  - Extra-early dwarf flints: 4 races and 6 agro-ecotypes
    - Agostinello
    - Poliota
    - Tirolese
    - Trenodi
  - Microsperma flints: 4 races e 8 agro-ecotypes
    - Appenniniche
      - Zeppetello
    - Subalpine
      - Cadore
      - Cinquantino Marano
      - Quarantino estivo
  - Padanians: 4 races and 7 agro-ecotypes
    - Poliranghi
      - Bani-Scaiola
      - Pignolo
      - Rostrato-Scagliolo
    - Longispiga
      - Agostano
  - Pearl white flints: 3 races and 4 agro-ecotypes
    - Bianco Perla
    - Cimalunga
    - Righetta bianco
  - Dent corn: 2 races and 5 agro-ecotypes
    - Dentati bianchi antichi
    - Dentati moderni
- Section Everta
  - Pop corn: 3 races and 12 agro-ecotypes
    - Bianco tardivo cremonese
    - Perla prolifico
    - Risiforme precoce

== Future ==
Genetic erosion is a menace to the basis of further improvement for a monoecious allogamous species, Zea mays L., whose genetic progress is mainly founded on the combination of the structural and physiological traits, contributed by each parental genotype, and a hazard to the specific qualities of different maize varieties, selected throughout the centuries as a major element for each peculiar meal involving maize derivates.

== See also ==
- Consiglio per la ricerca e la sperimentazione in agricoltura
