= Lambruschini =

Lambruschini is an Italian surname. Notable people with the surname include:

- Alessandro Lambruschini (born 1965), Italian long-distance runner
- Armando Lambruschini (1924–2004), Argentine Navy admiral
- Luigi Lambruschini (1776–1854), Italian cardinal
- Raffaello Lambruschini (1788-1873) Italian author, pedagogist, and agronomist,
