= Ticozzi =

Ticozzi is an Italian surname. Notable people with the surname include:

- Giovanni Ticozzi (1897–1958), Italian priest, educator, and ancient languages scholar
- Stefano Ticozzi (1762–1836), Italian art historian
