= Nazareno Strampelli =

Italian agronomist (1866–1942)

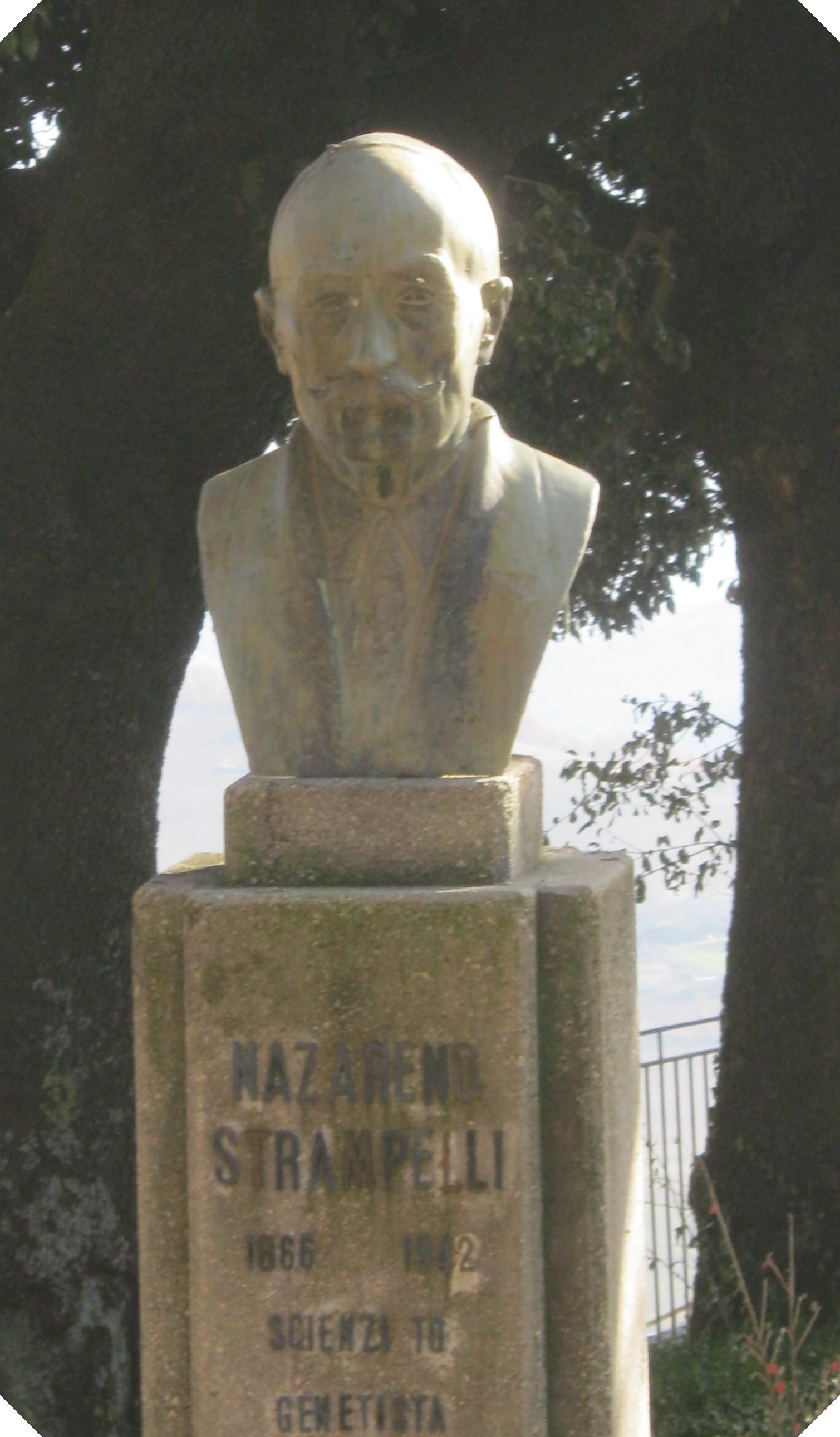
Photo of the bust of Nazareno Strampelli (1866-1942), italian agronomist and geneticist.

Nazareno Strampelli (May 29, 1866, in Castelraimondo, Italy – January 23, 1942) was an Italian agronomist and plant breeder. He was the forerunner of what became known as the Green Revolution of the late 1960s. Strampelli's work allowed Italy to become almost self-sufficient in bread wheat production, relative to Italy's contemporaneous population and consumption patterns, increasing area-based agricultural intensity from an average yield of 1.0 t/ha at the beginning of the 19th century to about 1.5 t/ha in the 1930s, through the hybridization of wheat into high-yield varietals.

== Early years ==
After graduating in agriculture at the University of Pisa, he taught for a few years at the University of Camerino and in Reggio Calabria.

== Career ==
In 1900, while in Camerino, he started his research on the hybridization of wheat, although he was unaware of the concurrent work of Gregor Mendel. In 1903 he was chair of agriculture in Rieti, while there he continued to cross wheat varieties and within a few years developed new high-performing hybrid combinations. From 1907 he was in charge of the "Wheat experimental station".

His wheat breeding programs achieved the shortening of the growing phase and increasing of the disease tolerance through the reduction of the stem size. Strampelli's best performing varieties were named Gregorio Mendel, Luigia, Varrone, followed by small sized and high baking varieties such as Villagloria, Ardito (the result of crossing local wheat with Japanese Akagomugi), Mentana, Edda, Balilla and Fanfulla. In order to disseminate the results of his studies, he established a farmers' association in Rieti.

In 1919 a national cereal crop breeding institute was established in Rome, and Strampelli was appointed as director. Starting in 1925 he was in charge of a major national program, La battaglia del grano, supporting the increase of wheat production and yield, aimed at ensuring Italian food security and self-sufficiency. Strampelli named his wheat variety Ardito in honor of the storm troopers led by Gabriele D'Annunzio, who established a short-lived, proto-fascist state in Fiume in 1919-20. Strampelli joined the National Fascist Party in 1925, and in 1929 he was nominated Senator of the Kingdom for his scientific achievements.

== Final years ==
In his final years, he created three new high-yielding and small sized varieties of wheat: S. Pastore, Velino and Turano. The Mentana variety was exported and cropped in Sonora, Mexico, and became the source of a new generation of high-yielding, small size wheat varieties. The Istituto Sperimentale di Genetica "Nazareno Strampelli" in Lonigo, Vicenza, is named after him.

== See also ==
- Tito Vezio Zapparoli
- Girolamo Caruso
