= Tojorí =

Bolivian drink

Tojorí is a traditional drink from the Bolivian highlands, created from a base of mazamorra that is ground from large pieces of willkaparu corn (a variety of Bolivian maíz), The corn is typically ground with a batán stone, which allows large pieces to be ground, that is then cooked for several hours, after which it is served hot.

== Ingredients ==
Although there are regional variations of the drink, the primary ingredients are ground corn, cinnamon, cloves, and anise. Originally, no sugar is added, but chancaca is used to sweeten and give the drink its color and flavor.

== Commercialization ==
It is generally served in street stalls, fairs and traditional markets in La Paz, Santa Cruz, Tarija, Sucre, Cobija, Oruro, and Cochabamba, although it is also sold in bags for later preparation. From street vendors it is offered with and without milk, also accompanied by a fritter or a puffed cheesecake. It is served hot or warm, sometimes mixed with purple api.

== Regional variations ==
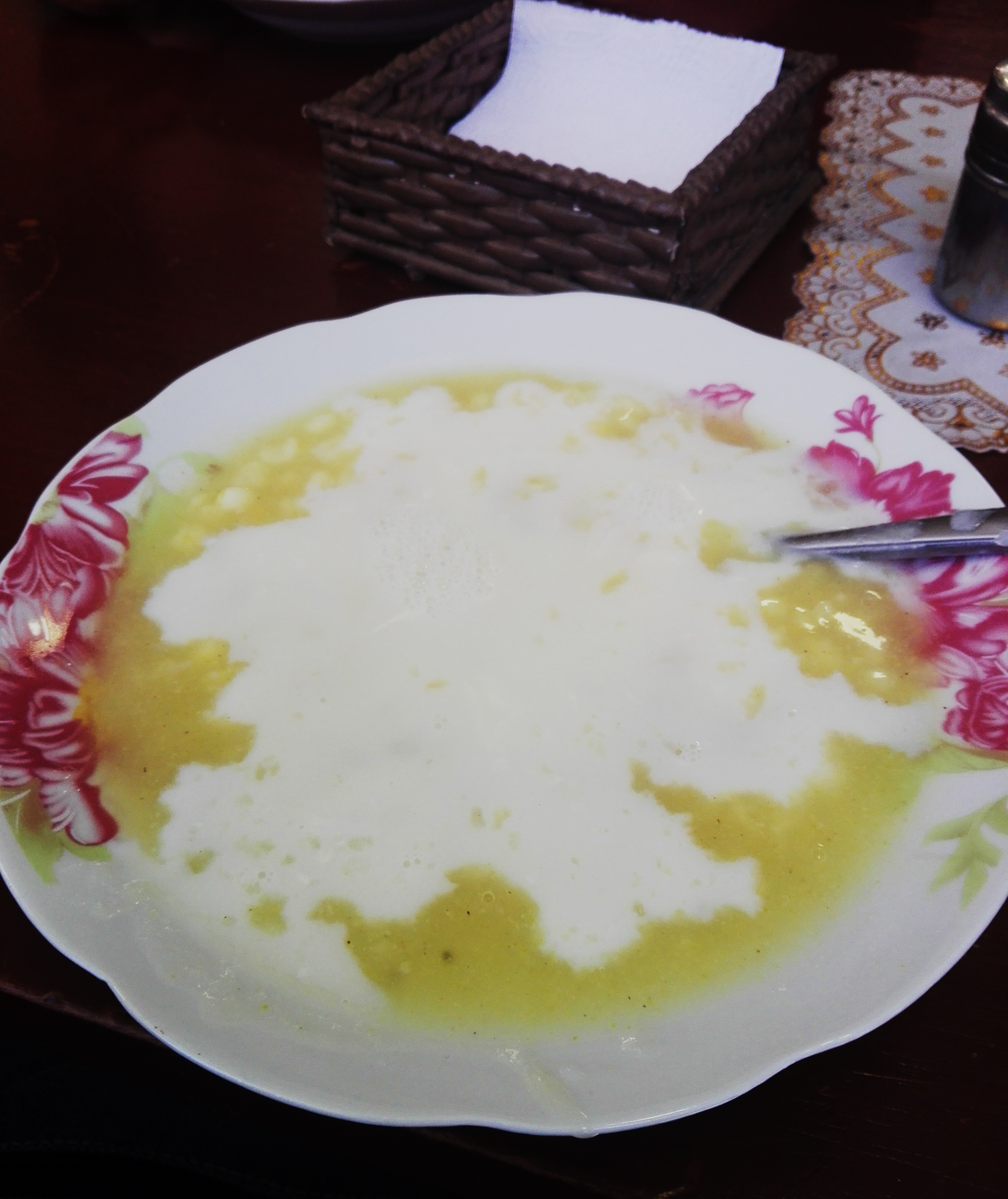
Tojuré tarijeño.

In both the south-southeast of Bolivia and in tropical areas (Santa Cruz, Tarija, Beni, Pando and the Gran Chaco), a very similar drink is consumed called tujuré. A drink that is distinguished by being served cold and with milk and is very similar to the mazamorra made from corn in other Latin American countries.

In Tarija, apart from traditional tujuré, the tojuré or tujuré tarijeño can also be found, it is served hot or cold, and includes more milk and cream in its preparation, and is served in a soup dish.

== School breakfast ==
In 2008, a variety of tojorí with milk was incorporated into the school breakfast of San Benito, in Cochabamba.

== See also ==
- Somó
