= Arturo Jehan De Johannis =

Italian economist and pedagogue (1846–1913)

Arturo Jéhan De Johànnis (1846-31 May 1913) was an Italian economist and pedagogue. He was born in Venice to a family of French ancestry. He however lived in Italy and died in Florence. He graduated with bacccaulaureate from the Istituto tecnico of Mantua. He was named professor of economics and statistics at the Istituto Cesari Alfieri (Istituto superiore di scienze sociali) of Florence. He would become the school's director. In 1883, he became director of the journal, l'Economista. He published a number of academic texts for education in economics and social sciences.

== Works ==
- Sulla libertà dell'insegnamento specialmente superiore studi, lecture 1870 at the Ateneo di Venezia with letter by the president of the Reale Accademia dei Georgofili, senator Luigi Ridolfi
- La tassa detta Milizia da Mar : studi e considerazioni (1878)
- A Proposito del Libro Di Emile Zola: Feconditá
- La conversione della rendita (1904)
- Discussioni economiche : note critiche e saggi di studio sopra alcuni principi di economia politica (1881)
- In difesa della onestà dello stato (1910)
- Le monopole de la production de l'argento (1892)
- Analisi psicologica ed economica del valore : studio (1883)
- Il credito agrario ed i Banchi di Napoli e di Sicilia (1888)
- Le banche di emissione ed il credito in Italia (1888)
- Sui rapporti tra capitale e lavoro: lecture before Reale Accademia dei Georgofili (1895)
