= Armando Maugini =

Italian agronomist and tropicalist

Armando Maugini (May 1, 1889, Messina – 1975, Florence) was an Italian agronomist and tropicalist. Maugini shaped and directed the activities of the Istituto agricolo coloniale italiano, presently the Istituto agronomico per l'oltremare in Florence for forty years.

After several years of agronomic field trials and extension in Libya and laboratory research in Florence, he was appointed director of the Istituto agricolo coloniale italiano (Italian Agricultural Colonial Institute) in 1924. He worked there through the era of Italian colonial expansion, the Second World War, and the reshaping of the institute to its current form in 1953 holding the position of director until 1964, when his collaborator and friend Ferdinando Bigi was appointed as new director until 1968. Under his direction, the institute, which was renamed the Agronomic Institute for Italian Africa in 1938, carried out research and training to support agricultural projects in Italy's colonies.

He ran the magazine L'agricoltura coloniale, later known as Rivista di agricoltura tropicale e subtropicale, and published several books and hundreds of articles on the topics dealt with by his institute. He enhanced staff technical skills and material endowments and established a net of collaborations with professionals and institutions worldwide. A shy and resolute man, pressing his resolutions with the touch of the countryside gentleman, Maugini was respected by colleagues and authorities, and enjoyed the trust of the farmers as well as of the international scientific and academic community.

Trained as an agro-economist, he worked in Africa at the start of his career. He was appointed director of "Agricultural services" in the Cyrenaica colony in eastern Libya, studying the flora and agricultural traditions of the Libyan society. Back in Italy he organized the exploration and analysis of the natural and agricultural resources of tropical regions, assisting Italian agricultural colonization initiatives in Africa and in the Eastern Mediterranean islands between the two World Wars, and later the migration of Italian farmers to Latin America. His hands-on approach to the African environment and human dynamics resulted in precious advice on the valorization of ethnic and traditional knowledge and skills and the integration of indigenous dynamics in the shaping of the plantation enclave economy, thus containing the amount of metropolitan farmers settling in the Italian colonies.

His legacy includes a rich archive and photographic documentation on the Italian presence and work in Africa, the Mediterranean islands and Latin America, as well as on the environment and agriculture of the tropical and sub-tropical regions, stored at the Documentation Center and the Photographic Archive of the Istituto agronomico per l'oltremare.

== See also ==
- Aureliano Brandolini
- Italian Colonial Empire
- Tropical agriculture
