= Bolivia maize varieties =

The varieties of Bolivian maize are the result of thousands of years of selective breeding for superior agronomic and cooking traits.

Climate and soil diversity is a key feature of the landscape of Bolivia, a country extending between 9° to 22° South and 57° to 69° West. The indigenous cultures that played a key role in the differentiation of the native Bolivian maize races were the Aymara in the north, the Sauces in central Bolivia, and the Yampara in the south. Specifically, the Aymara adapted maize crop growth to the Lake Titicaca plateau, about 3,500-3,800 meters above sea level, a harsh environment, cold, arid, and windy.

Traditionally, maize is cropped in the following regions:

- Low tropics (200–900 masl)
- Subtropics (1,000–1,600 masl)
- Sub-Andean Chaco (200–1,500 masl)
- Inter-Andean slopes and valleys (1,700–3,000 masl, as far as the shore of Lake Titicaca at 3,800 masl)

Most maize harvested under 1,000 masl is cropped in commercial farms and used to feed livestock.

== Use as food ==
Maize is a staple ingredient of traditional Bolivian cooking. It is used to prepare typical dishes such as:

- Api - hot drink for breakfast,
- Chaque & Lagua - soup,
- Chicha - alcoholic drink,
- Choclo - kernels boiled inside the ear leaves,
- Confituras - cooked popped kernels dressed with honey,
- Huminta - smashed milky kernels, seasoned and cooked inside the ear leaves,
- Mote - dry cooked kernels,
- Tostado or Palomitas de maíz - popcorn.

Different varieties of maize are used in diverse locally specific culinary recipes. For instance, purple maize can be used to produce a hot beverage called "Api" in the highlands and white maize can be used to make a cold beverage called "Somó" in the lowlands

== History ==
Maize crossed from the Peruvian mountains into Bolivia about 3,000 BCE as a marginal food of the Andean peoples. Primitive maize, with small and popping kernels, and flint endosperm aligned in four distinct rows on the ear, later shifted to a decussate eight row alignment. Prior to the Incan rule of Bolivia, selection of the mean primitive ears with eight rows diversified and underwent qualitative specialization (kernel composition, consistency, shape and color), followed by the increase in the number of the rows. The key events of this process were;

- the increase in the ear size,
- the increase in the number of the kernels per ear,
- the increase in the number of the rows of kernels,
- the increase in the kernel size,
- the change in the kernel texture.

Later, selection was directed to link molecular markers (pigmentation) to the different kinds of present-day varieties. For instance;

- semi-flint kernel varieties are yellow,
- floury kernel varieties are white,
- soft texture kernel varieties are motley.

Maize from the "Morocho" and "Perla" varieties crossed the Andes mountain ridge and adapted to the lower altitude and different climates of Paraguay, Argentina, and the Brazilian lowlands, before the arrival of the Spaniards in the sixteenth century.

== Contemporary classification ==
Since the mid-1970s, the Centro Fitotécnico y Ecogenético de Pairumani in Cochabamba collected and characterized over 1,500 maize samples. These were studied by environment, morphology, and cytological analysis of the chromosomes, resulting in the classification of 7 racial complexes, 45 races and hundreds of agro-ecotypes. These accessions are presently stored at the Pairumani germplasm bank.

On the basis of these and previous studies, Aureliano Brandolini and collaborators identified the following racial complexes and races of native maize;

- A. Pisanckalla (Popcorn)

Popcorn kernels very small and hard. Grown everywhere. No change in flowering and ripening cycle when grown in temperate latitudes.

- Pasanckalla
  - Pasanckalla
  - Pasanckalla puca
- Pisankalla del valle
  - Periquito
  - Periquito rojo
  - Pisanckalla
- Pura
  - Pura
- Purito
  - Purito
  - Maíz purito
- B. Valle alto (High valley)

Short and anthocyanic plants with very low ear insertion. Grown between 3,000 and 3,700 masl, in the Lake Titicaca plateau.

- Huaca songo
  - Huanta songo
- Jampe tongo
  - Jampe tongo
  - Jampi tongo
- Paru
  - Peru
  - Pintado aiquileño
  - Niñala
  - Pintado
- C. Harinoso del valle (Floury from the valley)

Medium to tall plants with usual red stalk. Size, shape (usually large) and color of the kernel greatly variable. Grown in the temperate valleys, 1,500–3,000 masl.

- Achuchema
  - Achuchema
- Aisuma
  - Aisuma
  - Arrayan
  - Azulino
- Amarillo harinoso de 8 hileras
  - Amarillo cliceño
  - Morocho corriente
  - Ocho rayas
- Blanco yungueño
  - Blanco yungueño
  - Blanco de tostar
  - Yunqueño
- Checchi o gris de tostar
  - Gris de tostar
  - Jancka sara
  - Jancka sara tuero
  - Puka checchi
- Chuspillo
  - Chulpi
  - Chulpi amarillo
  - Chulpi blanco
  - Chulpillo
- Concebideño
  - Concebideño
  - Huillcaparu breve
  - Morocho Yamparáez
- Colorado
  - Colorado
  - Culli Entre ríos
  - Culli Monteagudo
- Hualtaco
  - Blanco aiquileño
  - Blanco de Monteagudo
  - Blanco pojo
  - Yuraj sara
- Huillcaparu
  - Huillcaparu
- Kajbia
  - Kajbia
  - Kajbia huata
  - Kajbia tuero
- Kellu hillcaparu
  - Kellu huillcaparu
  - Amarillo
  - Hillcaparu patillo
- Kulli
  - Kulli
  - Collpa culli
  - Colorado potosino
  - Culli
  - Kulli chojnocollo
  - Taimuro
- Oke
  - Oke
- D. Morocho (Dark)

Semi-flint or semi-dent kernels, yellow or orange, thin and hard external starch layer and floury internal layer. Grown in the temperate valleys and subtropical regions, 1,000–3,000 masl.

- Karapampa
  - Karapampa chico
- Kellu o amarillo 8 surcos
  - Chuchuquella
  - Amarillo 8 surcos
  - Morocho Aiquile
  - Morocho de chuquisaca
  - Morocho 8 surcos
  - Tarijeño
  - Tojmac kellu
- Morochillo de Tarija
  - Kajeño
  - Liqueneño
  - Morocho de Tarija
- Morocho chaqueño
  - Amarillo duro
  - Morocho Colorado
- Morocho chico
  - Amarillo 8 rayas
  - Morocho Panti Pampa
  - Morocho Tarijeñito
  - Patillo
  - Perla amarillo
- Morocho grande
  - Morocho grande
  - Amarillo huancaní
  - Morocho Entre ríos
- Morocho 8 hileras
  - Amarillo pojo
  - Kara pampa pintado
  - Morocho
  - Morocho criollo
  - Morocho Guadalupe
  - Morocho puente
  - Morocho tomina
  - Suricha
  - Turareña
  - Morocho trigal
- E. Amazónico (Amazonian)

Tall and long cycle plants, with broad ears (Enano excepted), and joint floury or semi-flint kernels, large and brittle rachis. Grown in the Amazon and partially in the Chaco lowlands, 150–1,000 masl.

- Bayo
  - Bayo
  - Amarillo blando aiquileño
  - Bayto
- Blando amazónico
  - Blando amarillo
- Blando cruceño
  - Amarillo cruceño
  - Amarillo blando
  - Blanco blando
  - Blando
- Canario
  - Aperlado sauci
- Duro amazónico
  - Blanco aperlado
  - Blanco duro
  - Duro beniano
  - Duro robore
- Enano
  - Enano
- Perla pandino
  - Perla pandino
- F. Perla (Pearl)

Mostly short cycle plant with white and round kernels. Grown in the valleys and plains.

- Aperlados
  - Amarillo Tacacoma
  - Aperlado
  - Aperlado Tomina
  - Blanco rosa
- Chake sara
  - Chake sara
  - Kjachichi
- Perla
  - Perla
  - Arrocillo perlita
  - Grande
  - Perla blanco
  - Perla chuqui
- Perlas de los llanos
  - Blanco perla
  - Duro blanco
- Perlas de los valles
  - Arrocillo
  - Uchuquilla
  - Uchuquilla de Quillacollo
  - Uchuquilla potosino
- Perola
  - Perola
  - Arrocillo duro
  - Blanco cruceño
  - Blanco Roboré
  - Blanco San José
- Perla amarillo
  - Azucarillo
  - Huerteño
  - Perla mojo toro
  - Santa Elena
- G. Cordillera (Mountain range)

Grown in the transition zone between Chaco and the Andes meso-thermic valleys.

- Blanco mojo y Blanco camba
  - Blanco mojo
  - Blanco camba
- Cordillera
  - Cordillera
  - Argentino
  - Tucumano
- Morochos de 14 hileras o Morocho camba
  - Cordillera Colorado
  - Duro
  - Morocho camba
  - Morocho cruceño
- H. Razas de reciente introducción (Recently introduced races)

They include varieties such as Cubano amarillo, crossed with local races. Grown in the tropics and sub-tropics, 250–1,500 masl.

== See also ==
- Binomial nomenclature
- Ecuador maize varieties
- Geography of Bolivia
- International Maize and Wheat Improvement Center
- Shattering (agriculture)
- Subspecies
