= Ecuador maize varieties =

Types of corn/maize in Ecuador

The varieties of Ecuadorian maize are the repository of a rich farming and cooking tradition.

Maize is cropped almost everywhere in Ecuador, with the exception of the Altiplano, the cold desert highlands 3000 meters above sea level. Maize production is concentrated in the provinces of Loja, Azuay, and Pichincha, and to a lesser extent Bolívar, Chimborazo, Tungurahua, and Imbabura, provinces located in the mountains. Maize is also found in the coastal provinces, Manabí, Esmeraldas, and Guayas, as well as Pastaza, part of the Ecuadorian Amazon.

== Use as food ==
Most traditional foods are strictly linked to specific maize kernel types as well as grinding and cooking techniques. Cooked or toasted grains, and puddings of partially ripe grains, are prepared with mostly floury kernel varieties;

- Chicha - brewed drink of ground maize kernels,
- Chullpi - sweet maize,
- Maíz tierno - soft maize, at the milk ripeness stage,
- Maíz cao - waxy stage maize,
- Mote - boiled maize with beans,
- Canguil - popcorn,
- Pan - bread of maize flour, kneaded and baked,
- Tamal - maize and meat rolls,
- Tortillas - flatbread of maize flour, kneaded and cooked on a hot plate,
- Tostado - toasted maize with or without fat.

== History ==
Maize is believed to have crossed the Isthmus of Panama around 5,000 years BCE reaching Colombia and later the Ecuadorian coast. Since then, domestication and evolution of native varieties followed this pattern;

- adaptation to the low and middle highlands of the Eastern Andes,
- creation of the primitive races and extension of the adaptation area,
- introgression by hybridization with Tripsacum,
- partial introduction of maize from other regions,
- inter-racial hybridization and creation of hybrid races in the highlands,
- selection of the endosperm composition, kernel size and shelling fitness, taste, and the suitability for chicha and chicha morada brewed drinks.

The first description of Ecuadorian maize varieties was written by the colonial chronicler Father Juan de Velasco (1727–1792);

- Amarillo (Yellow) - large and soft,
- Blanco (White) - large, long, very soft, used for bread flour,
- Canguil - small, hard, pointed, used for popcorn,
- Carapali - medium size, white with red apex,
- Chulpi or Chullpi - white, medium, very soft and sweet, sweet corn,
- Morocho - small, medium, yellow, hard, used to brew chicha,
- Negro grueso - black, large, and hard,
- Negro mediano - black and soft,
- Tumbaque - large, flat, dark green, and soft.

== Contemporary classification ==
Kernels of maize varieties eaten in Ecuador are the outcome of the evolution of varieties of the following morphological groups described by Alfred Sturtevant;

- Zea mays everta - popcorn, known locally as canguiles,
- Zea mays amylosaccharata - sweet corn, known locally as chullpi,
- Zea mays indurada - dark maize, known locally as maíz morocho,
- Zea mays amylacea - soft maize, known locally as maíz suave.

During 1962 and 1963 Aureliano Brandolini collected 458 seed samples of the Ecuadorian varieties within the equatorial zone, between 2° North and -6° South. The comparative study of the behavior of these accessions resulted in the identification of racial complexes corresponding to those described earlier by D.H. Timothy and collaborators. A few races, morocho, harinoso dentado, montaña, and candela, were not included in the sampled varieties, while a few new races were described, such as colorado puntiagudo, harinoso cónico, and huaco sara, as well as tunicata, a variety cropped in Bolívar Province.

The classification of Ecuadorian maize was based on the following data; location and environment (altitude and photoperiodic response included), plant and ear characteristics, cytological analysis of the chromosomes, and historic and ethnographic information concerning the crop.

The tripsacoid races of everta, indentata, and indurata, sections were separated from the primitive ones of the amilacea, amylosaccharata, indurata, and tunicata sections, and from maize imported or derived in historical times from the amylacea and indurata sections.

This study underlined that:

- The Canguiles group from the Andean highlands is not sensitive to photoperiod change, as well as the Lima varieties of possible recent introduction. These varieties apparently have gametophytic isolation characteristics.
- The varieties of lowland tropical origin are luxuriant, reaching over 5.5 meters of height, tassel excluded. By comparison, Canguiles and the flint kernel maize from the highlands sierra, Morocho, Patillo, Perlilla, and Tusilla, have a plant size lower than 2.0 meters.
- The tassel size varies greatly and is not linked to the environment; the shortest tassel is that of the tropical Dentado, the largest, 55 cm, is that of the sierra Uchima.

Studies enabled the identification of the following racial complexes and races:

- Zea mays everta
  - a. formas primitivas (primitive forms)
    - Canguil
  - b. formas derivadas (derived forms)
    - Canguil grueso
- Zea mays indurata
  - a. formas primitivas
    - Clavito
    - Enano gigante
    - Morocho 8 hileras
    - Pira
  - b. formas derivadas
    - Andanqui
    - Morocho Colorado
    - Uchima
    - Yungueño
  - c. formas de reciente introducción (recently introduced forms)
    - Cubano
- Zea mays indentata
  - Dentado
  - Sintético
- Zea mays indurata
  - a. grano blanco (white kernel)
    - Morocho (Sabanero)
    - Perlilla
    - Tusilla
  - b. Grano colorado y semivítreo (Reddish and semi-flint kernel)
    - Kcello / Nal Tel
    - Patillo
- Zea mays amylacea
  - a. grano blanco
    - Harinoso 8 hileras
  - b. grano amarillo (yellow kernel)
    - Mishca
  - c. grano rojo (red kernel)
    - Harinoso cónico
    - Harinoso puntiagudo
    - Racimo de uva
- Zea mays amylosaccharata
  - Chullpi
- Zea mays tunicata
  - Huaco

Important primitive, derived or imported traditional varieties still cropped are:

- Highlands sierra
  - Maíz suave (soft maize)
    - Huandango
    - Maíz cónico dentado
    - Maíz de los Chillos
    - Maíz harinoso dentado
  - Morocho (dark maize)
    - Montaña
    - Morochón
    - Sabanero ecuadoriano
    - Tusilla
    - Uchima
  - Maíz precoz (early maize)
    - Kcello
- La Costa (The Coast) & El Oriente (The East)
  - Maíz duro (hard maize)
    - Chococeño
    - Cubano
  - Maíz blando (soft maize)
    - Candela
    - Gallina
    - Tuxpeño

== See also ==
- Binomial nomenclature
- Bolivia maize varieties
- International Maize and Wheat Improvement Center
- List of Ecuadorian dishes and foods
- Subspecies
- Ternary name
