= Luigi Fenaroli =

Italian botanist and agronomist (1899–1980)

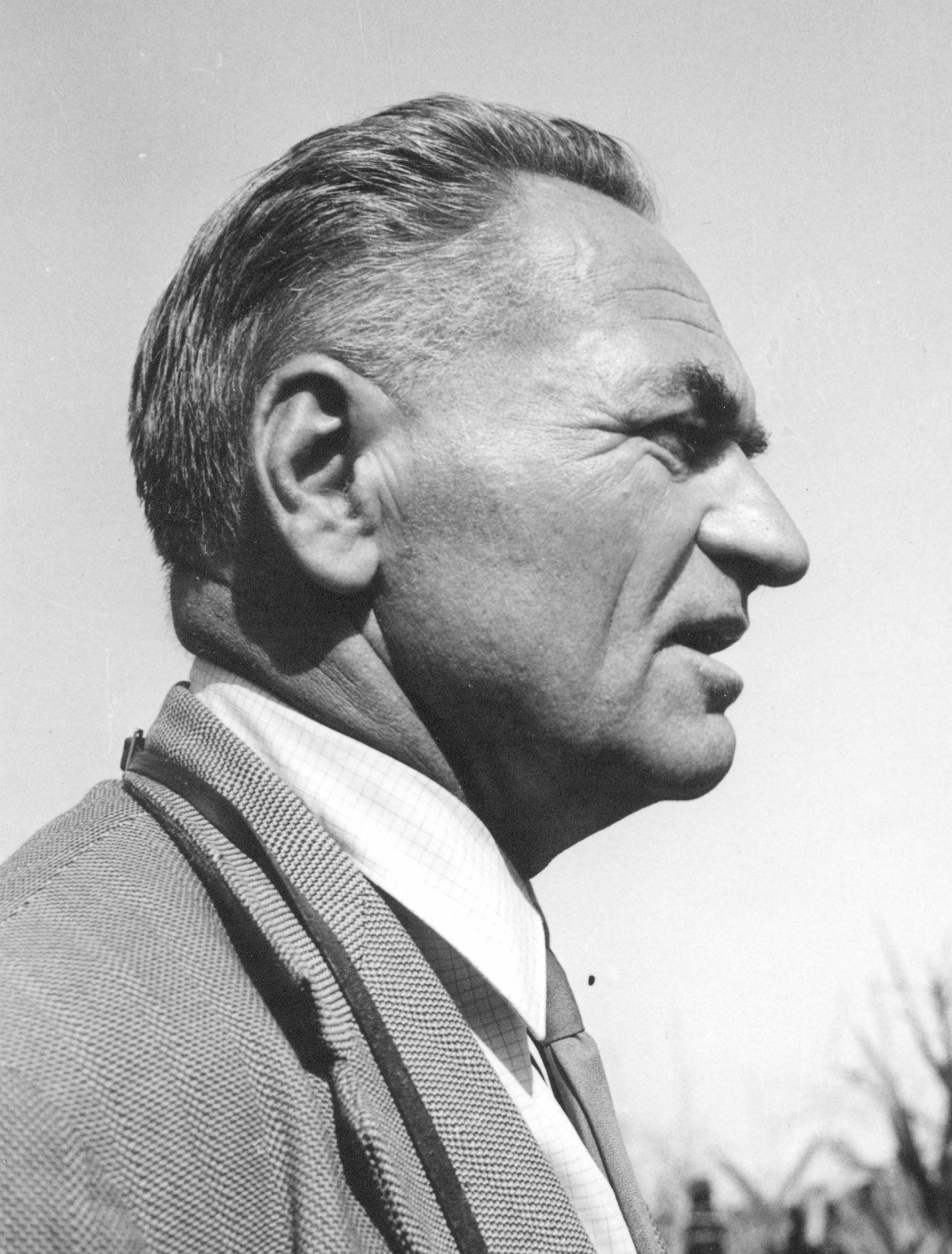
- Born: May 16, 1899; Milan, Italy
- Died: May 8, 1980 (aged 80); Bergamo, Italy
- Citizenship: Italian
- Scientific career
- Fields: Botany, Agronomy

Luigi Fenaroli (May 16, 1899 in Milan – May 8, 1980 in Bergamo) was an Italian botanist and agronomist.

Luigi Fenaroli graduated in agriculture at the Higher School of Agronomy at the University of Milan in 1921. He performed several naturalistic expeditions, on behalf of the Reale società geografica italiana (Italian Royal Geographical Society). In 1930 he was in Angola and spent 1932 and 1933 in the Brazilian Amazon.

In 1933 he was appointed vice-director of the Stazione sperimentale di selvicoltura (Forestry experimental station) in Florence. In 1943 he moved to the Istituto sperimentale di pioppicoltura (Poplar experimental station) in Casale Monferrato in Piedmont. In 1946 he became director of the "Maize experimental station", established by eminent agronomist Tito Vezio Zapparoli. There he directed the Hybrid Maize Program, designing, from 1948 to 1953, the experimental field tests plan for the trials of the American hybrids introduced to Italy after the Second World War. He shaped the program for the collection of seed accessions of traditional Italian varieties of maize during 1954 and 1955, and sponsored the program selection of inbred lines, fixed from such varieties and their combinations with American lines, under the coordination of his pupil and friend Aureliano Brandolini. From 1968 to 1974 he directed the newly established Istituto sperimentale di assestamento forestale e alpicoltura (Forestry and Alpiculture Management Institute) in Trento.

Luigi Fenaroli performed several teaching assignments, starting as junior professor at the Faculty of Agriculture at the University of Milan and as an interim chair of agriculture in Iseo. He later taught tropical forestry at the Istituto agronomico coloniale, now known as the Istituto agronomico per l'oltremare in Florence, and sub-tropical and tropical agriculture at the University of Milan. He was in charge of systematic botany, phytogeography, silviculture, and alpiculture courses at both the University of Milan and the University of Piacenza.

As a geneticist he was visiting professor to several universities. In 1946 he traveled to Illinois, in order to study maize breeding techniques and in 1964 he was invited by the Canadian government to study potato breeding. He visited Egypt and Japan, in order to disseminate the lessons learnt in his studies.

His scientific activity resulted in about 275 publications, on subjects ranging from phytogeography to systematic botany, forestry to botany, as well as on flora and nature conservation. Several of his papers dealt with the study of the localization of endemic species in the Insubria region, and of mountain and forestry livelihood of Northern Italy.

His most relevant scientific books include:

- Il larice nelle Alpi orientali italiane (Larch in the Eastern Italian Alps), 1936, for which he was awarded the prize of the Accademia d’Italia;
- L’ambiente fisico-agrario dei paesi caldi (The Physical-Agronomic Environment in Hot Climate Countries), 1943;
- Le Palme e la loro utilizzazione (Palms and their uses), 1945;
- Il castagno (The Chestnut Tree), 1946;
- Il genere Populus (The Populus Genus), 1946;
- La flora delle Alpi (Flora of the Alps), 1956;
- I Carex d’Italia (The Carex in Italy), 1951;
- Il genere Styzolobium (The Styzolobium Genus), 1952;
- La vegetazione e flora delle prealpi lombarde (Plants and Flora of the Lombardy Pre-Alps).

As an editor he was in charge of the publishing the following books:

- Iconographia Mycologica by Giacomo Bresadola, in collaboration with G. B. Traverso, 1936;
- Flora illustrata delle Alpi e degli altri monti d’Italia (The Pictorial Flora of the Alps and other Italian mountains), by Otto Penzig, 1932;
- Colture tropicali by Oreste Campese, 1937;
- Flora d’Italia (Italian Flora), by T.C.I., with Valerio Giacomini, 1958;
- Dendroflora Italiana: alberi (Flora of Italian Trees), with Germano Gambi and others, 1976;
- Carta della vegetazione reale d’Italia (Italian Plants Map), for the Italian Ministry of Agriculture and Forestry, 1969.

His bequeathed a broad scientific legacy, including a large Herbarium and photographic archive, as well as his family's botanical garden, in the municipality of Tavernola Bergamasca, on the shore of the pre-alpine Lake Iseo, where he grew plants and crops exotic to the Lombardy region.

== Affiliations ==
Luigi Fenaroli was a fellow of the following academies:

- Academia Colombiana de ciencias exactas, fisioquímicas y naturales, Bogotá, Colombia;
- Instituto Ecuadoriano de ciencias naturales, Quito, Ecuador;
- Società di scienze naturali del Trentino Alto Adige, Trento, Italy;
- Atheneum of science, arts and letters, Brescia and Bergamo, Italy;
- Accademia nazionale di agricoltura, Bononia, Italy;
- Accademia italiana di scienze forestali, Florence, Italy.

He acted as:

- President of the committee honoring Giacomo Bresadola, Trento;
- Vice-president of the Fondazione per i problemi montani dell’arco alpino, Milan;
- Academic at the Club alpino Italiano (Italian Alpine Club).
