= Torre dei Pulci =

Building in Florence, Italy

Coordinates: 43°46′06.7″N 11°15′18.2″E

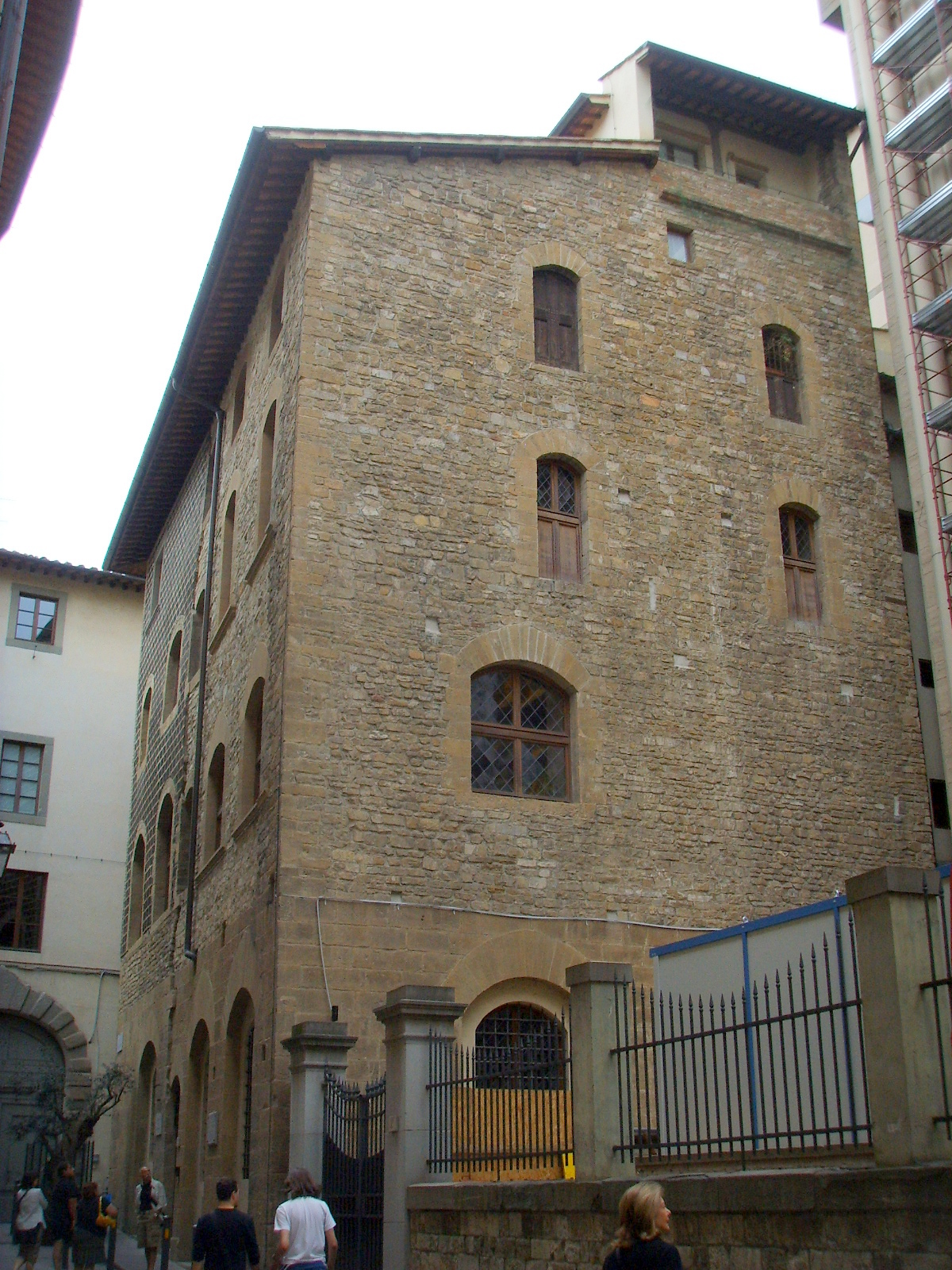
The rebuilt Torre dei Pulci

The Torre dei Pulci is a historical tower in Florence, Italy. The tower was the residence of the Pulci family in medieval and Renaissance times, including poet Luigi Pulci. It was in origin a purely defensive tower, which was enlarged until it became a sort of palazzetto or small residential palace.

Since 1933 it has been the seat of the Accademia dei Georgofili. In 1993 it was severely damaged by a mafia bombing, which caused the death of five people (including one of the Academy's scholars) and also damaged the nearby Uffizi. The tower was rebuilt, but it was decided to use different materials for the remade part, as a sign of the tragic event.

In front of the tower is now a symbolic peace olive tree.

== Sources ==
- Cesati, Francesco (2003). La grande guida delle strade di Firenze. Rome: Newton Compton Editori.
