= Giardino Botanico Tropicale dell'Istituto Agronomico per l'Oltremare =

Botanical garden in Italy

Coordinates: 43°46′07″N 11°15′25″E

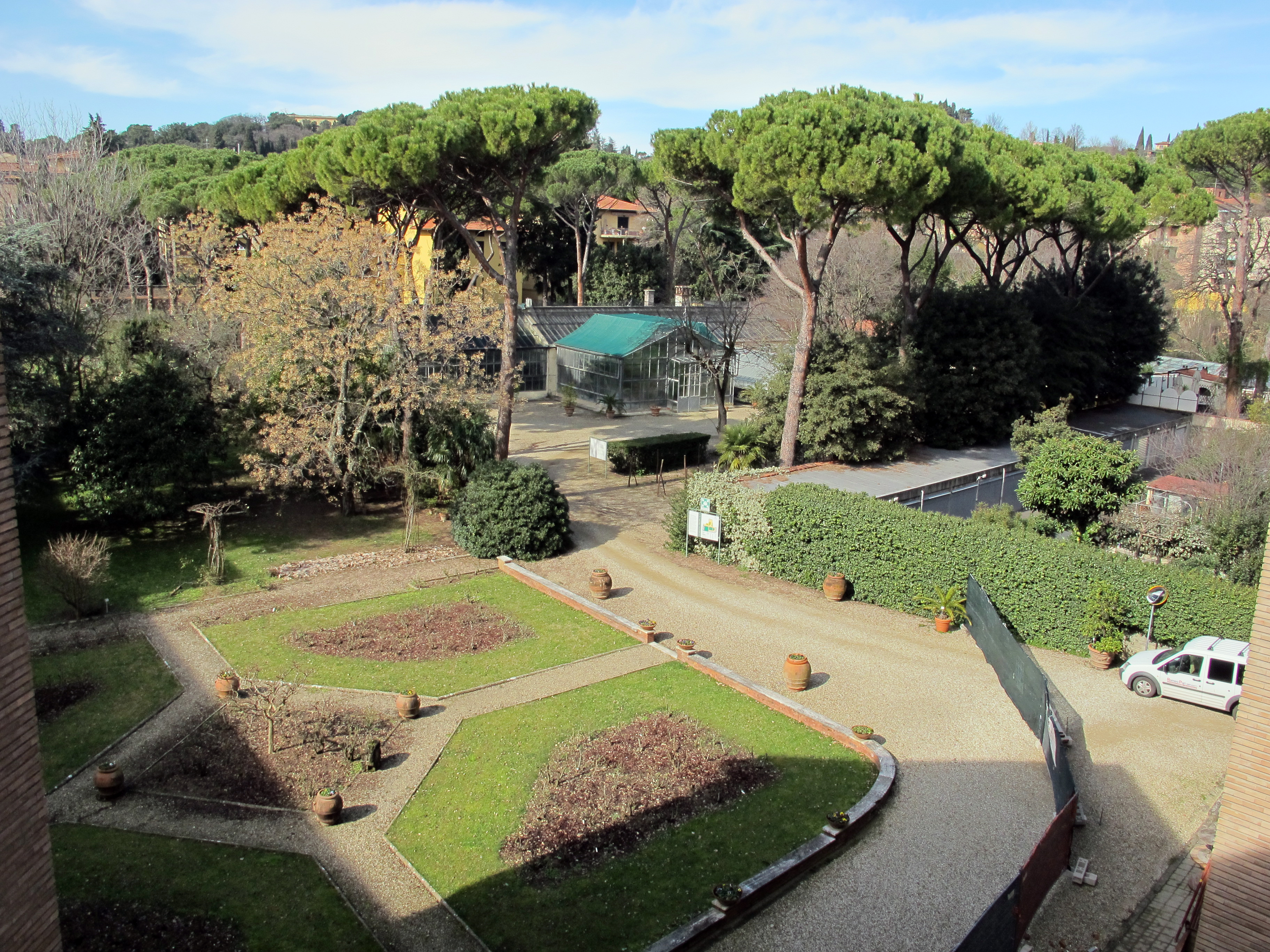
The botanical gardens

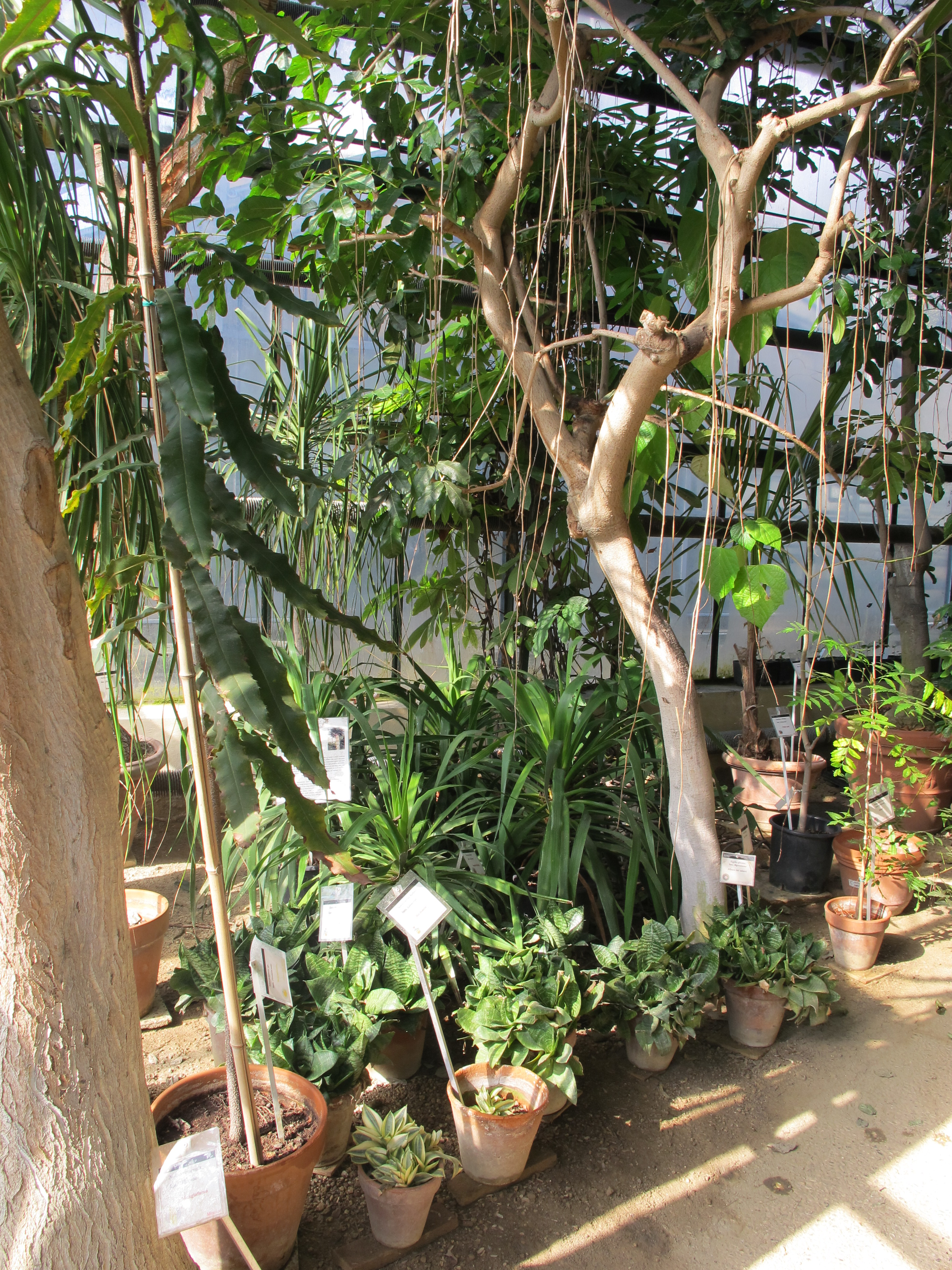
Inside one of the greenhouses

The Giardino Botanico Tropicale dell'Istituto Agronomico per l'Oltremare is a botanical garden specializing in tropical plants. It is located at via Antonio Cocchi 4, Florence, Tuscany, Italy, and open without charge on Thursday mornings and by appointment.

The garden was established in 1904 by tropical agriculture specialists as part of the Istituto Agricolo Coloniale Italiano with an eye towards improving agriculture in Eritrea, Somalia, Ethiopia, and Libya. Over the years the institute has evolved to become the Istituto Agronomico per l'Oltremare (IAO), a branch of the Italian Ministry of Foreign Affairs, and is now a technical-scientific body for studying, training, consulting, and providing technical assistance in agriculture and environmental protection.

Today the garden contains about 300 species of useful tropical plants, primarily from Africa and the Americas. Plants are grouped according to use, with most in greenhouses but several dozen species growing outdoors. The collection includes sources of food (banana, cocoa, coconut, date, mango, papaya, pineapple, vanilla, and others), wood (mahogany, etc.), textiles (such as cotton), and dyes and perfumes.

The institute also maintains an agriculture museum and entomological collection.

== See also ==
- List of botanical gardens in Italy
