= Via dei Georgofili bombing =

1993 terrorist attack in Florence, Italy

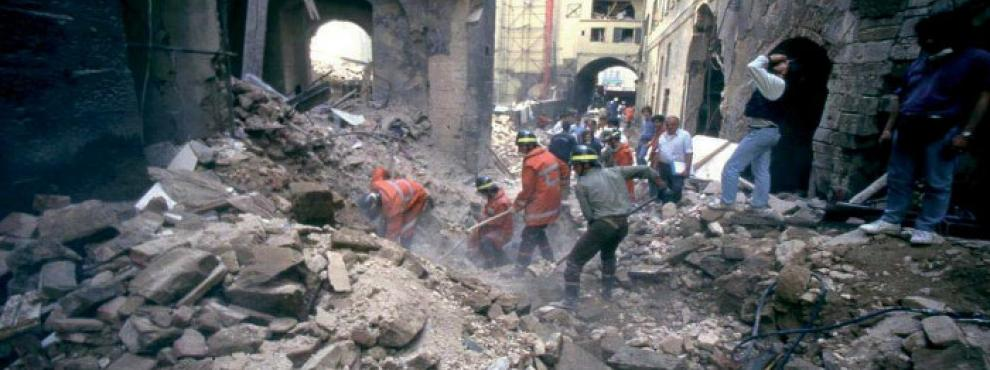
- The Torre dei Pulci, the main target of the bombing
- Location: Florence, Tuscany, Italy
- Date: 27 May 1993
- Attack type: Car bombing
- Weapon: Explosives
- Deaths: 5
- Injuries: 48
- Perpetrator: Sicilian Mafia

The via dei Georgofili bombing (Italian: Strage di via dei Georgofili) was a terrorist attack carried out by the Sicilian Mafia on 27 May 1993 outside the Uffizi Gallery in Florence, Italy in retaliation for the arrest of Mafia boss Salvatore Riina.

The attack was carried out with a Fiat Fiorino packed with 227 kilograms of explosives, parked near the Torre dei Pulci, between the Uffizi museum and the Arno River. The tower was the seat of the Accademia dei Georgofili. The large explosion caused the death of five people and forty-eight other people were injured by the blast. The tower and other buildings were destroyed and others damaged, including the Uffizi Gallery and the Vasari Corridor, where several paintings were heavily damaged or destroyed.

== History ==
Preparations

In April 1993, Gioacchino Calabrò, a Castellamare del Golfo boss, visited Prato with Giorgio Pizzo, a Brancaccio mafioso. There, they played hosts to Gaspare Spatuzza, Cosimo Lo Nigro and Francesco Giuliano, mafiosi from Brancaccio and Corso Dei Mille, two districts of Palermo. The three had been manufacturing explosives in an abandoned building in Corso Dei Mille, and had arrived in Prato on 23 May, 1993.

The explosives were then shipped from said abandoned building to Prato by trucker and mafia collaborator Pietro Carra, who had stashed them in a hidden compartment of his vehicle.

On the evening of 26 May, Giuliano and Spatuzza burglarised a Fiat Fiorino lorry and packed it with nearly a quarter of a tonne’s worth of the explosives they had made in Corso Dei Mille.

The attack

On the evening of 26 May, Giuliano and Spatuzza parked the lorry in Via Dei Gergofili, near Torre Dei Pulci, the seat of the Accademia dei Gergofili. At 01:04 on 27 May, the explosives kept inside the vehicle detonated, immediately compromising Torre dei Pulci’s structural integrity. The blast also killed all four members of the Nencioni family, who lived in the building: Angela Fiume, the Academy’s custodian, her husband, Fabrizio Nencioni, and their two daughters, 9-year-old Nadia and two-month-old Caterina all died when the building collapsed. Subsequent fires then killed 22-year-old Dario Capolicchio, a student at the University of Florence.

In total, the attack claimed five lives and left forty-eight wounded.

The explosion also damaged part of the Uffizi and the Vasari Corridor. About a quarter of the works housed inside were damaged. Some of the Gallery’s masterpieces survived, as they were kept in shatter- and shock-proof frames. Several paintings were, however, damaged beyond repair: Bartolomeo Manfredi’s Musical Concert and Card Players were both lost, along with other works by Gerard Van Honthorst, Bartolomeo Bimbi, Andrea Scacciati, Francis Grant and Edwin Landseer.

== Trials ==
After Corleonesi boss Salvatore Riina was captured in January 1993, the mafia began bombing Italian cultural heritage sites. Several attacks, including this one, were ordered to serve as warnings to mafia members, in the hope of deterring them from becoming Pentiti, and as retribution for the State overruling Article 41-bis on prison regime.

In June 1998, Pentito Gaspare Spatuzza received a life sentence in relation to the bombing.

In 2000, Salvatore Riina, Giuseppe Graviano, Leoluca Bagarella and Bernardo Provenzano were sentenced to life imprisonment for ordering the massacre.

In 2008, Spatuzza became a collaborator of justice, and began revealing details behind the attack: its planning, its ideation and its execution in full. Most notably, Spatuzza claimed that the massacre had been ideated in the presence of Cosa Nostra bosses Matteo Messina Denaro, Giuseppe Graviano and Francesco Tagliavia. He also claimed that Tagliavia had footed the operational costs of the bombing. In 2011, due his role in the attack, Tagliavia was sentenced to life imprisonment by the City of Florence’s Court of Assizes.

Thanks to Spatuzza’s collaboration, Cosimo Lo Nigro’s cousin, fisherman Cosimo D’Amato, was arrested: Spatuzza claimed it was he who had provided the explosives to the Corso Dei Mille group, having disassembled unexploded ordnance scavenged off the coast of Palermo. The explosives were used in nearly all of Cosa Nostra’s numerous attacks against the State, including the Via Dei Georgofili bombing. D’Amato was sentenced to life imprisonment after a summary judgment in 2013. In 2015, he, too, became a collaborator of justice and a Pentito, confirming his and other mafiosi’s involvement in several bombings.
