= Pedodiversity =

Variation of soil properties within an area

Pedodiversity is the variation of soil properties (usually characterised by soil classes) within an area. Pedodiversity studies were first started by analyzing soil series–area relationships (Beckett and Bie, 1978). According to Guo et al. (2003) the term pedodiversity was developed by McBratney (1992) who discussed landscape preservation strategies based on pedodiversity. Recently, examinations of pedodiversity using indices commonly used to characterize bio-diversity have been made. Ibáñez et al. (1995) first introduced ecological diversity indices as measures of pedodiversity. They include species richness, relative species abundance, and Shannon index. Richness is the number of different soil types, which is the number of soil classes at particular level in a taxonomic system. Abundance is defined as the distribution of the number of soil individuals.

Just as biologists and ecologists talk about biodiversity, geologists on geodiversity, soil scientists can talk about pedodiversity. Pedodiversity has some overlap with biodiversity as soil contains organisms. Pedodiversity is a measure of soil variation, and pedodiversity is a function of soil formation.

Pedodiversity can be thought as a way to preserve, or even reconstruct, the soil cover. Just as biologists argue that organisms need to be maintained, soil scientists can argue that preserving soil will maintain organisms as well as other unique soil materials equally crucial in insuring our future wellbeing. In areas which have been degraded it will become important to reconstruct the variation. A quantitative knowledge of natural pedodiversity will ease the task of the person who attempts to rebuild quasi-natural soil systems.

Soil scientists have pragmatically adapted the concept of biodiversity and used diversity index such as Shannon index using taxa from well-accepted international soil classification systems.

Jonathan Phillips showed that in eastern North Carolina intrinsic variability within homogeneous landscape units is more important in determining the total pedodiversity of the study area than is the extrinsic variability associated with measurable differences in topography, parent material, and vegetation/land use. In another study, they found that soils in Ouachita Mountains of Arkansas vary considerably within small more-or-less homogeneous areas, and richness–area analysis shows that the overall pattern of pedodiversity is dominated by local, intrinsic (within-plot) variability as opposed to between-plot variability. This is consistent with variation controlled mainly by individual trees and local lithological variations. Given the criteria used to distinguish among soil types, biomechanical as opposed to chemical and hydrological effects of trees are indicated. Results also suggest divergent evolution whereby the pedologic effects of trees are large and long-lived relative to the magnitude of the initial effects and lifespan of the plants.

In 2003, Guo et al. used the State Soil Geographic database (STATSGO) to explored quantitative aspects of pedodiversity for the US. They found that the West USDA-NRCS geographical region has the highest soil taxa richness, followed by the Northern Plains. The South Central region has the highest taxa evenness, while taxa evenness in the West region is the lowest. The West or the South Central regions have the highest overall soil diversity in the four highest taxonomic categories, while the West or Northern Plains regions have the highest diversity in the two lowest taxonomic levels. The high diversity index in the West region results from high taxa richness while the high diversity index in the South Central region results from an evenness of taxa. As the taxonomic level decreases, the pattern of taxa abundance approaches a lognormal distribution. One of the key findings of this research is that at lower levels of soil taxonomic divisions (especially the series level), soil taxa increase continuously with increasing area, indicating considerable soil endemism in the US (and likely around the world), a key consideration in conservation and preservation planning.

However conventional diversity measures, only measure the relative natural abundance of soil classes, and there is no information on the taxonomic similarity or differences between soil classes. New measures of pedodiversity, such as the mean soil taxonomic distance, which considers both information on the relative abundance and the taxonomic differences between soil classes have been developed and shown to be a better measure.

The diversity of soils and landforms has hardly received any attention although their spatial and temporal variation may produce important quantitative and qualitative changes in the landscape. It is only in the last few years that the term diversity has also caught the attention of scientists working on soils and other fields within the earth sciences which creates a forum and research projects on geodiversity. Measurements of diversity were introduced to pedology few years ago. The concept of pedodiversity is now widely accepted within the soil science community. Pedodiversity, as well as biodiversity, may be considered as a framework to analyze spatial patterns, being recognized as a novel pedometric tool. Pedodiversity is a measure of soil variation and also a function of soil formation and development or evolution. Pedodiversity is introduced to pedology to analyze soil spatial patterns, soil geography, and test the pedogenetic theories. Thus, pedodiversity is not only concerned with analysis of the pedotaxa number in a given area or region, but it should tackle also with the pedological structures, spatial pedotaxa and soilscapes structure.
