= Istituto agronomico per l'oltremare =

Italian research institute

Coordinates: 43.785°N 11.2849°E

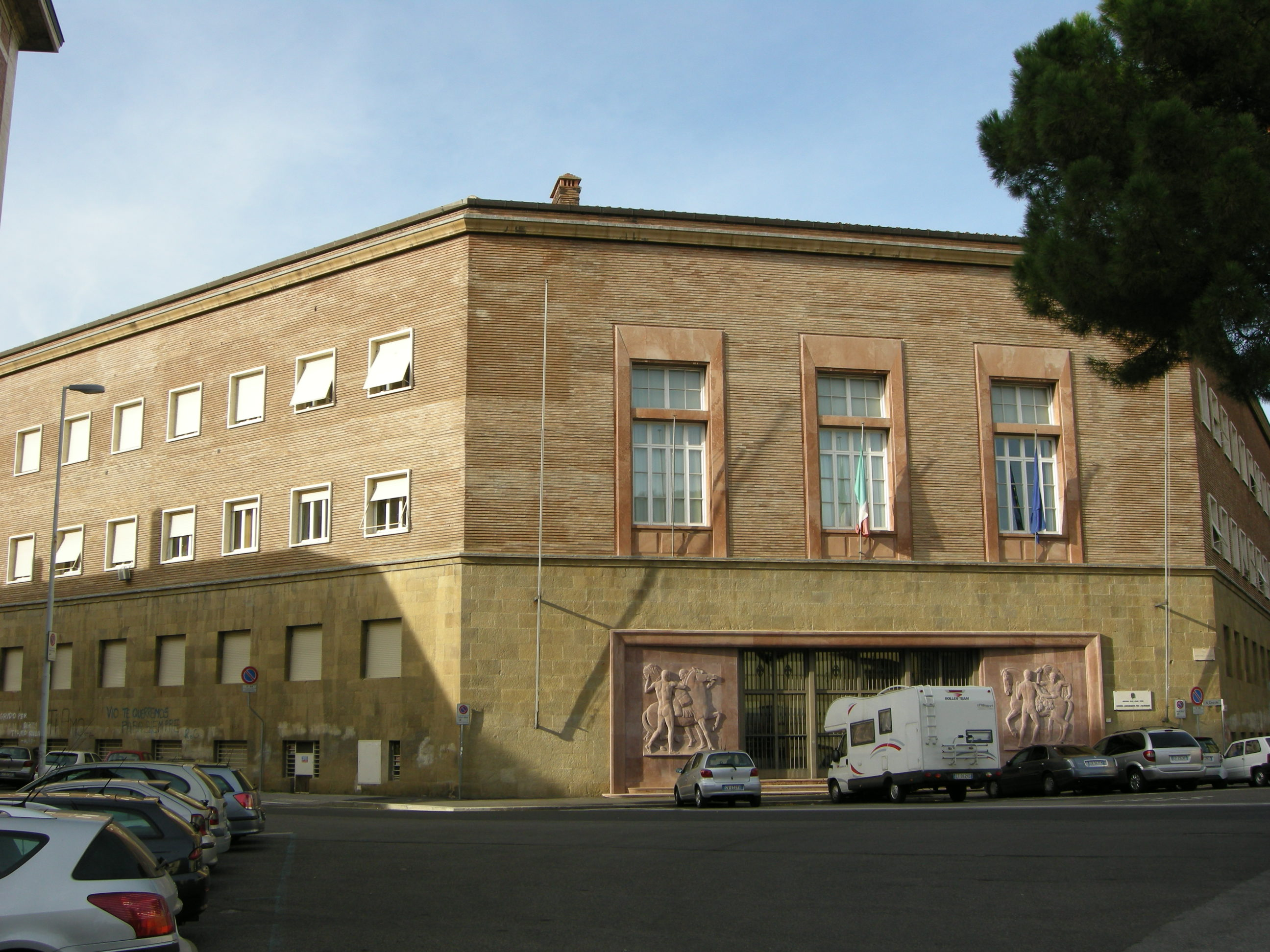
Istituto agronomico per l'oltremare

The Istituto agronomico per l'oltremare (IAO) (Overseas Agronomic Institute) in Florence, Italy, is a technical and scientific body of the Italian Ministry of Foreign Affairs.

== History ==
The institute was established in 1904 in Florence by Italian agronomists and tropicalists as the Istituto Agricolo Coloniale Italiano (Italian Colonial Institute), in order to promote the study and systematization of the tropical environment and agriculture and to implement vocational education and training of technicians and migrants, in the agricultural field.

The institute was very busy in the years between the two World Wars, under the leadership of Armando Maugini. It studied the agricultural and economic issues of Italian colonies and trained the technicians in charge of the economic valorization of the colonies and other regions. In 1938 the institute changed its name, becoming the Istituto agronomico per l'Africa Italiana. After the Second World War, the institute shifted its focus to the technical assistance to the Italians migrating to Latin America on agricultural topics. In 1959 the Institute received its present name and was assigned to the Ministry of Foreign Affairs.

== Organization ==
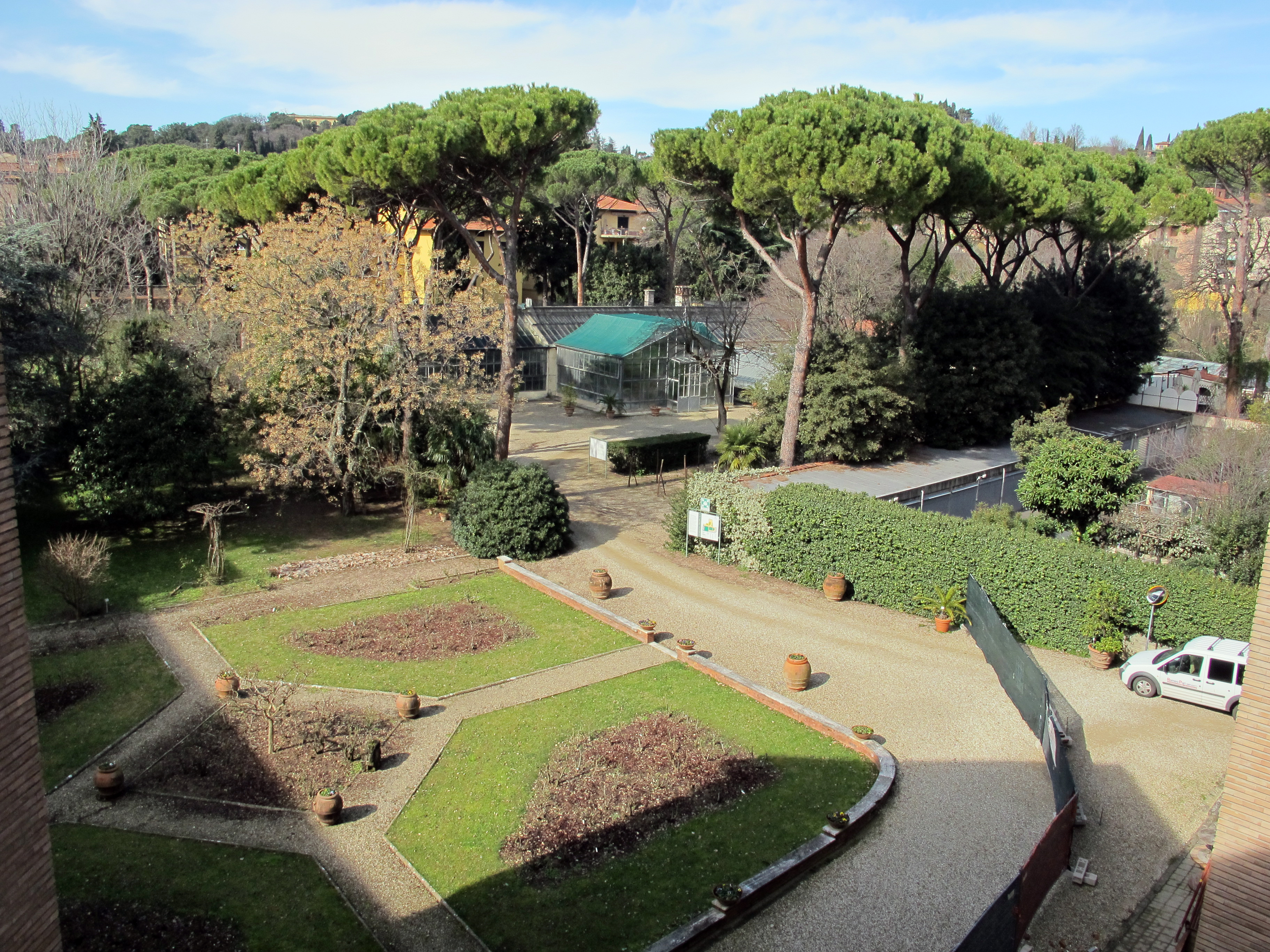
The gardens with the greenhouses

The IAO mandate is to study, train, advise, and support initiatives dealing with tropical and sub-tropical agriculture and environmental protection.

It is active in the field of development co-operation in Africa, Latin America, Asia and Eastern Europe. It runs agricultural development projects in developing countries, mainly on behalf of the Direzione generale per la cooperazione allo sviluppo of the Ministry of Foreign Affairs. The institute was very active in international co-operation after the enactment of Law n. 49 (1987) framing "Italian Development Co-operation", and since then it has mainly been dealing with agricultural and rural development topics, conservation and promotion of agricultural biodiversity and the development of sustainable agricultural technologies. The IAO collaborates with agricultural institutions, research centers, academies, associations and rural communities. The institute directly funds small research programs on farming and the environment, in collaboration with research centers from developing countries and hosts vocational training courses, on such topics as irrigation and geomatics. It is endowed with a teledetection and environmental analysis laboratory and owns the Bonistallo Farm in Poggio a Caiano, in the Province of Florence. Training courses have included field stages in Tuscany, the islands of Elba and Sardinia, and in the developing countries in which the institute has field activities including Bolivia, China, Eritrea, Morocco, and Tunisia.

The IAO Library was established in 1908 and specializes in tropical and sub-tropical agriculture and economics, gathering over 131,000 volumes and 800 periodical magazines.

The institute has a photographic archive and a documentation center, where historic information on agriculture in the tropics, and especially in the former Italian colonies, is stored.

The institute publishes an international scientific magazine: The Journal of Agriculture and Environment for International Development and several series of monographic studies.

The institute hosts a training center, and botanical garden with a collection of tropical and subtropical plants. Its main building hosts collections of tropical agriculture products and insects.

== Activities ==
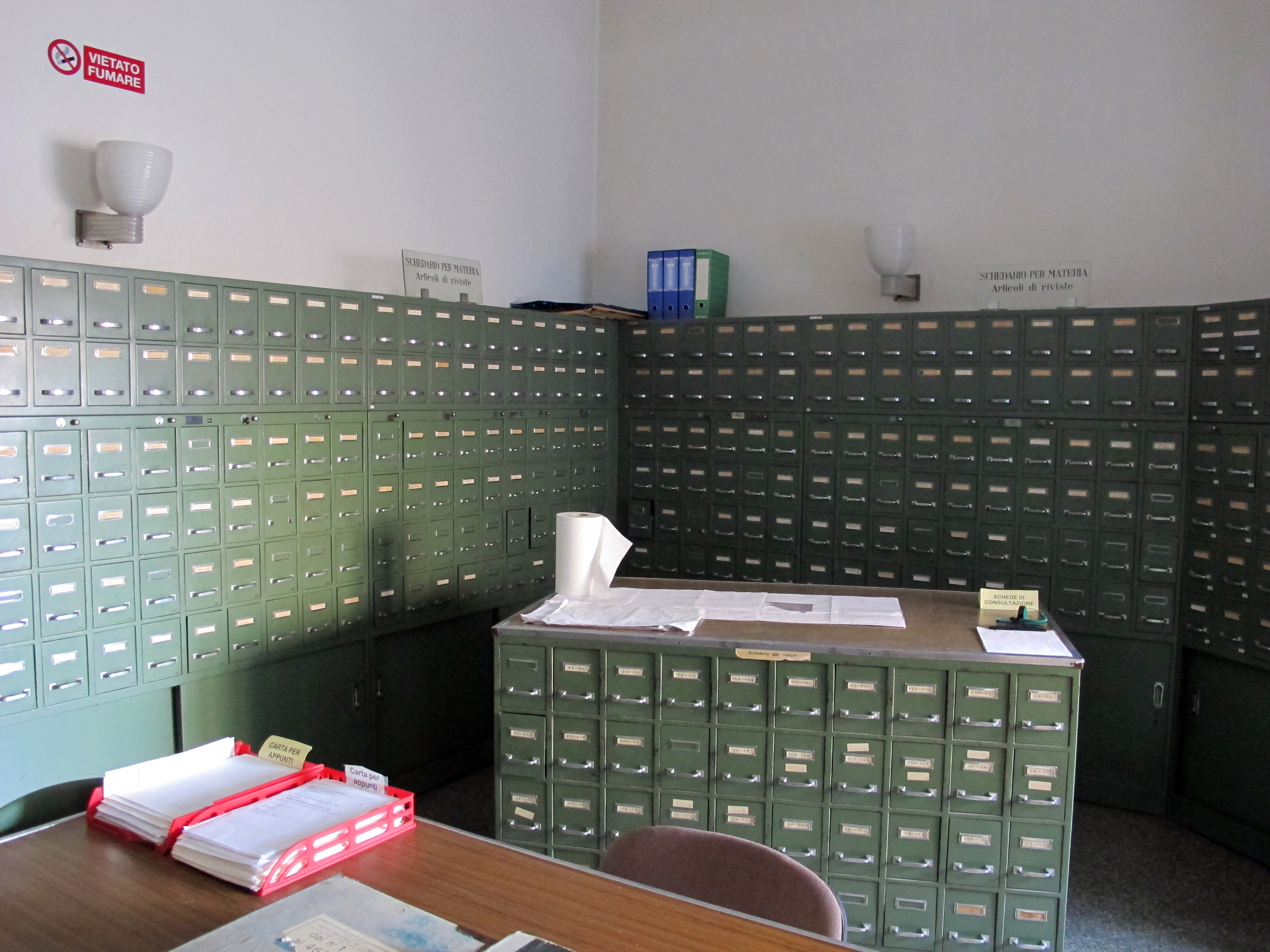
Filecabinets of the Library

The institute was involved in the several phases of the Italian overseas expansion. In the first twenty years of its existence, 1904 to 1924, it focused on the study of the natural resources and assets of Eritrea, Somalia and Libya. This orientation accrued the institute expertise in farming, technology, sociology and economics of the tropics. Such studies were intensified from 1924 to 1941, when the Institute assisted the expansion of Italian economic colonization of Africa. It participated in the elaboration of agricultural settlements plans, as well as in the training and technology transfer to Italian farmers and their families settling in the colonies. This great body of information, gathered under the direction agronomist Armando Maugini, resulted in the collection of a wide set of written and photographic documents and in the establishment of a collection of agricultural products, plants and other items, used in the training of technicians and dissemination of information.

The output of the institute studies and its technical proposals were implemented in the field. In order to host the growing staff and assets of the institute, new and spacious offices were built in Florence, still home the institute today.

After the Second World War, and the repatriation of Italian colonists from Africa, the IAO collaborated with the Italian trust administration in Somalia, by supplying technical skills to the newly formed Somali federal government. It also assisted Italian farmers migrating to Latin America, who were benefited by the same services, such as training, technical assistance, investments planning, etc., created for the development of the Italian colonies. Such work was completed with the reshaping of the Institute endowments, under directors Armando Maugini, Ferdinando Bigi, and Arturo Marassi. Once the Italian agricultural migration flow faded, at the beginning of the 1970s, the Institute shifted its focus to the development co-operation policies of the Ministry of Foreign Affairs, along the patterns established by Law n. 38 (1979) and Law n. 49 (1987). Such laws established the development co-operation of the Ministry of Foreign Affairs, collaborating with other scientific and technical institutions, in Italy and abroad. Since 1974, Prof. Nicola Matarrese, following the plenipotentiary Minister Ernesto Mario Bolasco, gives a decisive contribution in shaping the future development of the activity of the Institute in the framework of laws already in processing and then issued as indicated above. Matarrese leaves the direction of the IAO in 1977 to devote himself to full-time teaching of Agricultural Hydraulics at the Faculty of Agriculture of the University of Bari.

In the 1970s, director Vincenzo Faenza strengthened the IAO in the agro-economic field. From 1983 to 1993, director Aureliano Brandolini enhanced IAO assets and human resources in the field of laboratory research, and broadened the collaboration with international and developing country research centers, in order to establish local knowledge and skills, and to fine tuning sustainable technologies on the spot. Since 2000, director Alice Perlini renewed the institute's strategy, by focusing on co-operation with civil society organizations, support to the decentralized co-operation processes, and training of Italian and foreign technicians. The continuous adaptation of the IAO to new situations and activity enhancement allowed the expansion of the collaboration network and presence of the Institute in forums where agricultural development and natural resources conservation topics are debated. At the same time, the digital classification of the institute's documentation was undertaken and internet tools, enabling a wider dissemination of the rich information heritage of the IAO, were established. The institute organizes scientific conferences and work groups, study meetings, other cultural events, and experience exchanges with other institutions in Europe and overseas.

== See also ==
- Giardino Botanico Tropicale dell'Istituto Agronomico per l'Oltremare
