= Violette Impellizzeri =

Astronomer from Italy

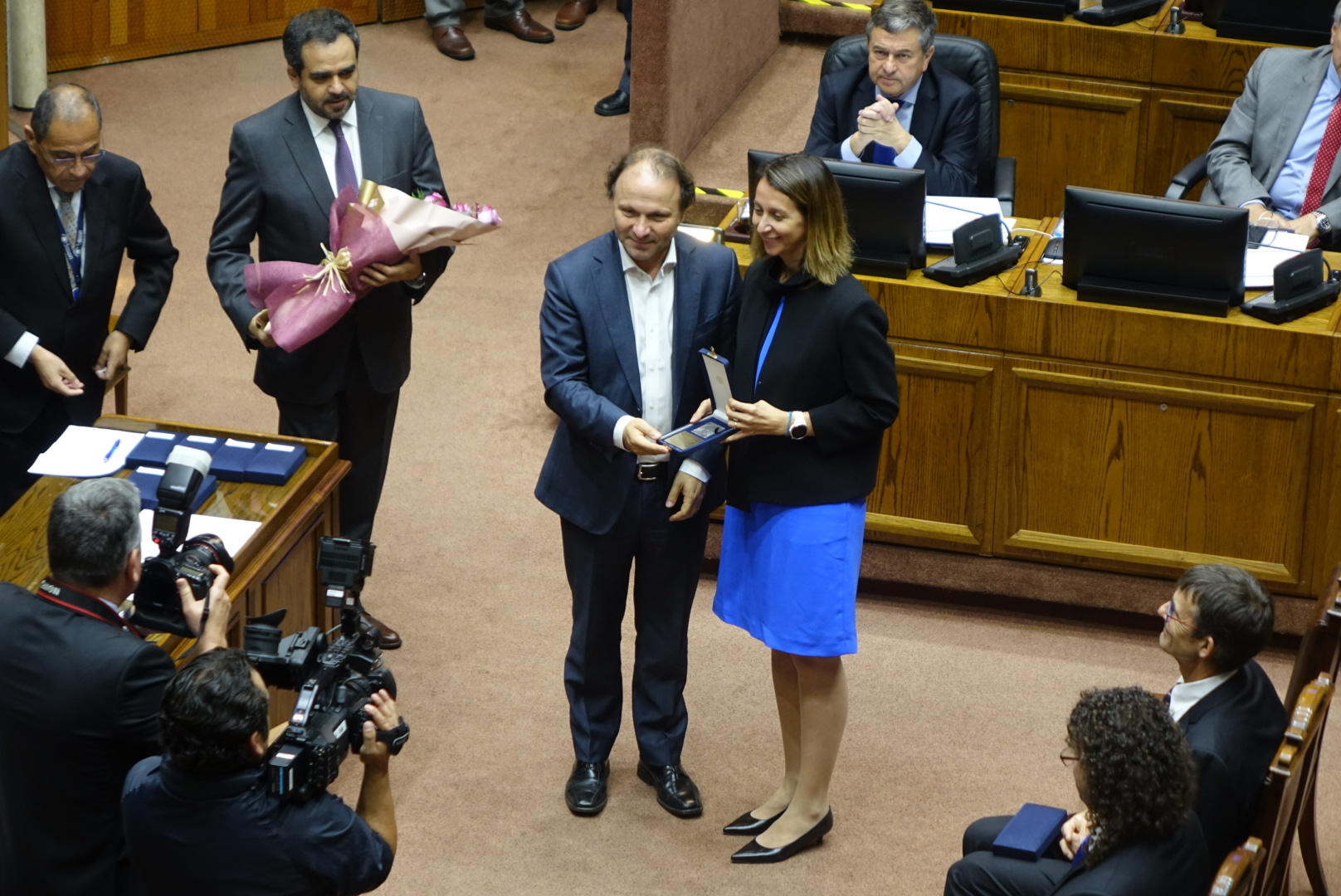
- Violette Impellizzeri (right) receiving an award from the Chilean Senate
- Born: 14 August 1977 (age 49); Palermo, Italy
- Education: University of Bristol; Max Planck Institute für Radioastronomie
- Occupations: Astronomer, astrophysicist and university lecturer

Violette Impellizzeri (born 14 August 1977) is an Italian astronomer and astrophysicist specializing in active galactic nuclei and molecular clouds surrounding supermassive black holes. She is currently a professor at Leiden University, where she conducts research on these phenomena using radio interferometry.

== Biography ==
Impellizzeri was born in Saronno, a comune in the Province of Varese, Italy. She completed her primary and secondary education in Alcamo, Sicily, before relocating with her family to Karlsruhe, Germany, where her father worked as a teacher.

She completed her studies at the European School in Karlsruhe, where she obtained her European Baccalaureate. In 1995, she entered the University of Bristol; later, she returned to Germany to complete a master's degree in physics and earned a PhD in astrophysics at the Max Planck Institute for Radio Astronomy in Bonn.

Following her doctoral studies, Impellizzeri conducted postdoctoral research at the National Radio Astronomy Observatory (NRAO) in Charlottesville, Virginia, focusing on physical cosmology and megamasers as part of the Megamaser Cosmology Project.

In 2011, she began working as an astronomer at the Atacama Large Millimeter Array (ALMA) in Chile. In October 2020, she returned to Europe to serve as a program manager with Allegro (ALMA Local Expertise Group) and the European ALMA Regional Center node in the Netherlands, hosted by Leiden Observatory. She currently teaches at Leiden University.

== Activity ==
During her doctoral studies at the Max Planck Institute, she mainly focused on active galactic nuclei on Radio Astronomy. As part of her research, she conducted a series of observations using the Effelsberg 100-m Radio Telescope to detect water masers in distant galaxies. Her discoveries were later confirmed by observations made with the Very Large Array Radio Telescope in New Mexico, operated by the National Radio Astronomy Observatory.

In 2007, while at the University of Virginia, Impellizzeri was recruited by a cosmological research initiative, the National Radio Astronomy Observatory, to contribute to the Megamaser Cosmology Project. She coordinated research efforts at the Green Bank Telescope in Virginia, integrating these with observations made using the Very Long Baseline Interferometry (VLBI) system. She continued to work with the VLBI system at the ALMA in Chile, where she was involved in testing and served as a liaison for VLBI activities.

Impellizzeri joined the Atacama Cosmology Telescope project as an NRAO astronomer, working with a radio telescope operating at an altitude of 5,000 meters. She was responsible for data integration of the Atacama Large Millimeter Array observations into the VLBI network under the title of “Friend of VLBI”.

== Honours ==
- Earned the title of “Woman of Stars” and published a paper in Nature on the discovery of the most ancient water in the universe.
- 11 August 2018: Awarded the Tablet Paul Harris Fellow by Rotary Clubs for her contributions to the diffusion of Italian culture.
- 18 April 2019: Awarded a medal by the Chilean government, as official recognition for her work done in the exploration of black holes.
- 12 August 2019: Received a Tablet from the Mayor of Alcamo in recognition of her work in scientific research.
- 5 September 2019: Together with the other astrophysicists who took the first image of a black hole, Impellizzeri was awarded the Breakthrough Prize (2020).
- 11 August 2021: Annual Prize of the Kiwanis Club of Alcamo, with the following remark: “To Violette Impellizzeri, an astronomer with international fame, for her dedication to the study of the mysteries of the universe and the safeguarding of the environment”.
- 28 November 2022: KHMW Outreach Award for her project ALMA for Leiden.

== See also ==
- Atacama Large Millimeter Array
- Breakthrough Prize
- Leiden University

== Sources ==
- "Violette, la donna delle stelle venuta da Alcamo". 15 February 2015.
- "Scienziata alcamese, in Olanda, a capo di gruppo di astronomi". 6 May 2021.
- "Violette Impellizzeri, l'astronoma cacciatrice del buco nero sognato da bambina". 19 April 2019.
- "Astrofisica? Può essere semplice. Violette Impellizzeri lo sa". 16 October 2016. Archived from the original on 12 May 2021.
- "Allegro, the European ALMA Regional Center node in the Netherlands".
- "About us".
- "Violette Impellizzeri Program Manager Allegro".
- "L'astronoma siciliana che in Cile svela i segreti delle antiche galassie". 10 December 2014.
- "Black Hole Imaged For First Time By Event Horizon Telescope". 15 April 2017.
- "La scienziata alcamese Violette Impellizzeri premiata dal governo del Cile". 19 April 2019.
- "First image of black hole released in Chile". Archived from the original on 12 April 2019.
- "Winners Of The 2020 Breakthrough Prize In Life Sciences, Fundamental Physics And Mathematics Announced".
- "Alcamo, Premio dell'anno kiwaniano. A Violette Impellizzeri prestigioso riconoscimento". 12 August 2021.
