= Consiglio per la ricerca e la sperimentazione in agricoltura =

Italian public body

The Consiglio per la ricerca e la sperimentazione in agricoltura (CRA) is an Italian public body based in Rome and supervised by the Ministry of Agriculture, Food and Forests.

The CRA is active in the research for agriculture, agro-industry, fisheries and forestry. It implements three-year plans, undertaking its own scientific, organization, administrative, and financial rules.

The CRA statutory bodies are:

- the central administration
- the president
- the board
- the departments council
- the auditors committee

The president is assisted by a secretariat. The board is active in the frame of the presidency. The CRA is made of 28 agricultural research bodies, assembling 54 operative units spread across Italy. Research bodies include the following departments:

- Agro-industry products processing and valorization; 11 research centers and units,
- Agronomy, Forests and Land; 11 research centers and units,
- Biology and Animal production; 8 research centers and units,
- Biology and Plant production; 19 research centers and units,
- Quality, Certification and Reference.

The departments direct, promote and coordinate scientific and technological activities of the related research bodies. Each department is structured in research centers and units.

The CRA supervises the "Morando Bolognini Foundation", based in Sant'Angelo Lodigiano, in charge of conservation and multiplication of the basic seed of improved plant varieties and hybrids.

The Publishing, Library and Communication service is in charge of divulgation, communication and participation to public events; it coordinates scientific and technical publishing activities. It supervises the institution's central library.

The CRA programs are aligned to the following topics:

- Agriculture as a service for the society,
- Innovation for enterprises national and international competitiveness,
- Strengthening of CRA scientific skills.
