= Cosimo Ridolfi =

Italian agronomist and politician

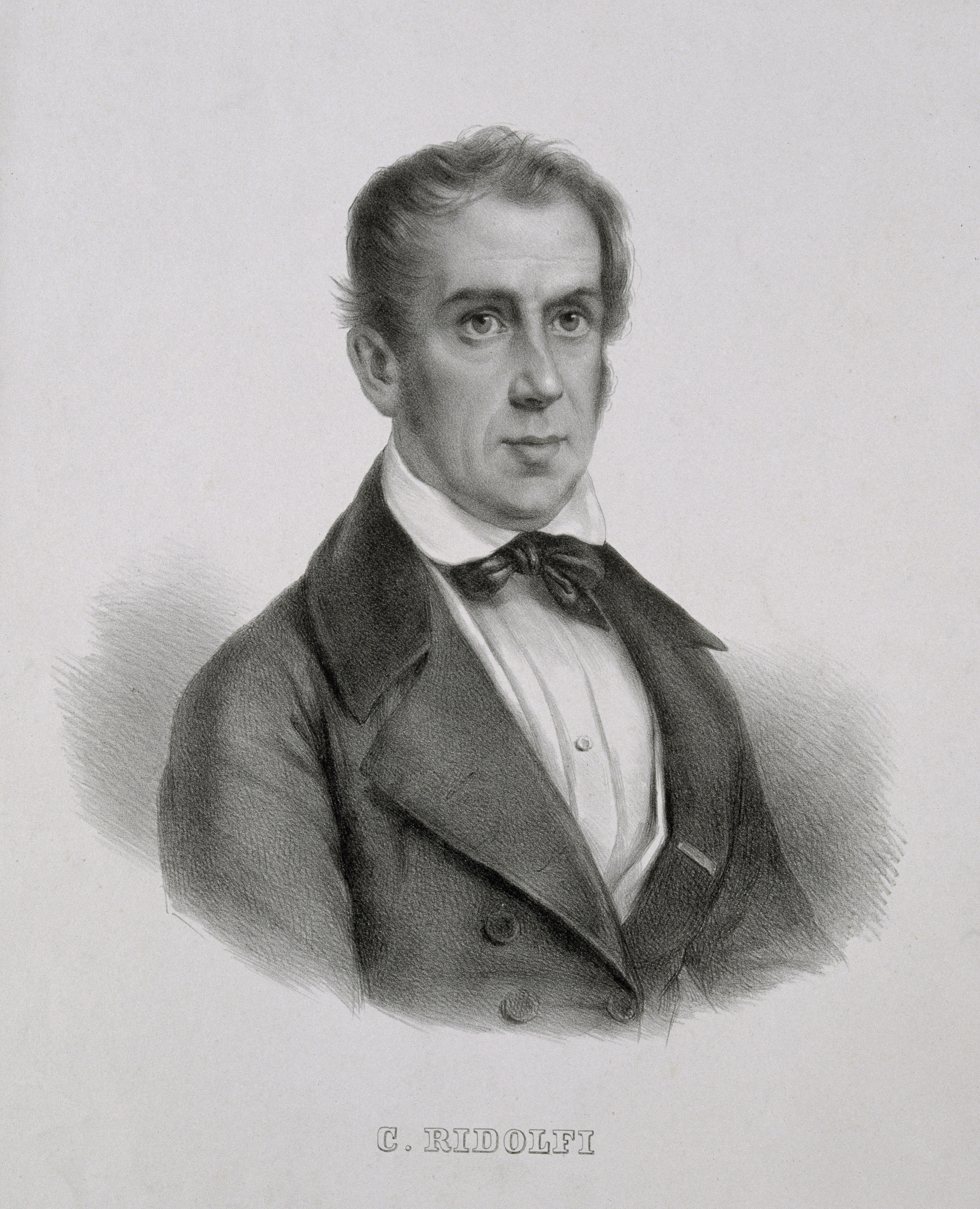

Marquis Cosimo Pietro Gaetano Gregorio Melchiorre Ridolfi (28 November 1794 – 5 March 1865) was an Italian noble, landowner, politician and promoter of agriculture and agricultural education. With scholarly interests, he promoted and established scholarly societies and several centres for education including the Italian agricultural institute in Pisa.

== Life and work ==
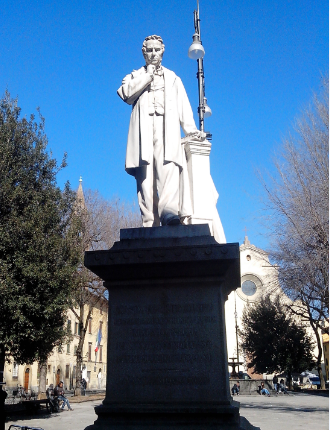
Statue of Ridolfi in Florence

Ridolfi was born in Florence in the noble family of Marquis Luigi and Anastasia di Giuseppe Frescobaldi with lands in Meleto and Bibbiani. After the death of his father, he was raised by his uncle Giovan Francesco Ridolfi who managed the family estate where he became interested in farming. He was tutored by Abbot Leopoldo Gignoli and went to the San Giovanni school where he took an interest in mathematics and the natural sciences. He had a special interest in plants and in 1811 he wrote a botanical manual. He experimented with dye-yielding plants and wine-making. He later designed a public gas lighting system and started a lithographic workshop in 1819. In 1813 he was admitted to the Accademia dei Georgofili. He married Luisa Guicciardini, daughter of Count Francesco Pucci in 1823 and they had two sons. He travelled widely and became a founder of the Tuscan Society of Geography, Statistics and Natural History in 1825. He shifted from the city to live in the villa-farm of Meleto and encouraged landowners to visit the countryside and interact with their tenant farmers. In 1827 he founded a periodical, the Giornale agrario della Toscano along with Raffaello Lambruschini and Lapo de' Ricci. During his travels in other parts of Europe he examined agricultural education, veterinary schools and wrote about these advances. In 1829 he established the Cassa di Risparmio di Firenze bank. In 1834 he was involved in establishing the Meleto Agricultural Institute on his estate in Meleto Val d'Elsa with the goal of training farmers and farm managers. Here he conducted experiments in addition to teaching. There were experiments on water and soil conservation and the herringbone drainage system invented by Agostino Testaferrata (1744–1822) was tried out here. In 1842 he was called to organize a university-based institution, the Italian agricultural institute which was opened in Pisa in 1843. Grand Duke Leopold II chose him as educator to the Crown Prince and between 1846 and 1850, Ridolfi was active in Tuscan political life. He served as a member of the Provisional Government of Tuscany from 1859-60. On March 23, 1860, Ridolfi became senator in the Kingdom of Sardinia and was also involved in organizing the Italian Exposition in Florence the next year.
