= Raffaello Lambruschini =

Italian politician

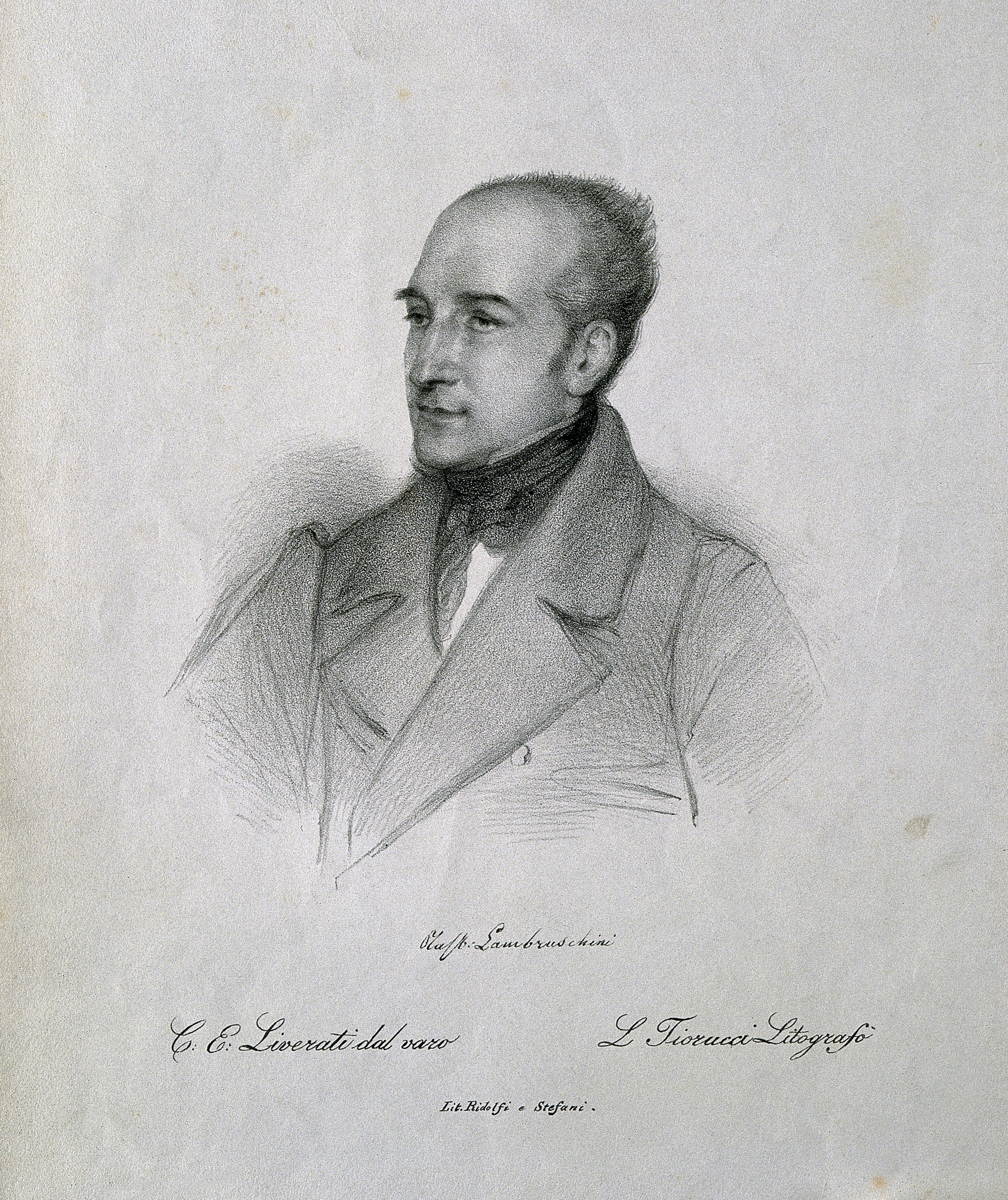

Raffaello Lambruschini (also called Abbé or Raphael Lambruschini) (14 August 1788 – 8 March 1873) was a priest, Tuscan agricultural and pedagogical scholar and author; and Italian politician and senator. His diverse interests were pursued through an evolving career.

== Biography ==
Nephew of the future cardinal, Luigi Lambruschini, Raffaello was born in Genoa to a merchant who soon moved to Livorno. In 1805, he traveled to Rome to pursue an ecclesiastical career. He completed his studies in a Jesuit seminary in Orvieto, where an uncle was bishop. In 1812, he was arrested and exiled to Corsica by the Napoleonic government. Freed by 1814, he did not join the priesthood. By 1816 he returned to Florence with his family, and in 1817 established himself in a country residence near Figline, where he passed a dozen years in the study of the natural sciences, agriculture and political economy. He joined the Accademia dei Georgofili of Florence and published some observations on progressive agronomy. By 1827, along with Cosimo Ridolfi, Lapo de' Ricci, and Gino Capponi, they began publication of the Giornale Agrario Toscano (Tuscan Journal of Agriculture).

In 1830, he founded and taught a small institute or school for young children at San Cerbone. By 1836, he had started Guida dell'educatore, a journal of pedagogy, that was printed until 1845. His principal pedagogical works were “Concerning Education" (1849) and posthumously published companion volume, "A Treatise on Instruction".

In 1847, he moves to Florence, and along with Bettino Ricasoli and Vincenzo Salvagnoli, he publishes a pro-Italian nation journal La Patria. His politics mixed loyalties to an Italian nation-state with a neo-guelph dedication; he aspired that there could be a more concordance between the Roman Catholic church and the rising liberal and nationalistic forces in the country. While remaining a staunch Catholic, he had misgivings about the church's influence in society. During the turbulent year of the Tuscan Republic of 1848, Lambruschini joined the government, and was elected to the parliament. But by late June 1849, the rule of the Grand-Duke of Habsburg-Lorraine was re-established in Florence. Lambruschini again retired to San Cerbone.

A decade later the Grand-Duke Leopold II and his son, Ferdinand IV, were deposed by both Tuscan and Piedmontese forces. This prompted Lambruschini to return to politics, becoming vice-president of the Consulta di Stato and deputy to the Tuscan Assembly and in 1861 to the Italian Senate. Lambruschini also persisted in his pedagogical interests, publishing and helping manage his institute. In 1865, he became president of the Accademia dei Georgofili; in 1867, Professor of Pedagogy and Anthropology at the Istituto di Studi Superiori of Florence, in 1869, Arch-consul of the Accademia della Crusca. He continued to publish, including Dell'Istruzione (1871); Delle virtù e dei vizi (1871) and Elogi e Biografie (1873). He died in his villa di San Cerbone; and was buried at Figline Valdarno.

== Bibliography ==
- Appletons' Annual Cyclopædia and Register of Important Events, Volume 13; New York 1873; page 592.
- Paraphrase from Italian Wikipedia.
