= Tito Vezio Zapparoli =

Tito Vezio Zapparoli (1885–1943) was an Italian agronomist and plant breeder.

After graduating in agriculture, he studied the agronomic and morphological characteristics of traditional varieties of maize.

In October 1920 the Stazione sperimentale di maiscoltura (Maize experimental station) in Curno was established, where he was appointed director after working with the agronomist Ottavio Munerati, the director of the "Beet experimental station" in Rovigo, and a master of the applied agronomic research methodology.

Zapparoli fostered genetic studies, breeding, and agronomic research, improving the varieties of maize cropped in northern and central Italy. He selected isogenic lines from the best performing populations of maize, and used the output of such to establish synthetic varieties and to produce inter-varieties crosses. He also developed the agronomic technique of matching the exigencies of the improved varieties. Zapparoli was known as the "Maize Man" by farmers and colleagues, for his wide and deep understanding of crop issues and for his personal good mood, humbleness, practical skills and probity.

He selected, multiplied, and spread the improved varieties: Marano (from the municipality of Marano Vicentino, where it was selected), Rostrato, Nostrano dell'Isola, and Scagliolo, selected from the offspring of the crosses performed by progressive farmers in the 19th century, He collaborated with the Federazione italiana dei consorzi agrari (Italian Federation of Agricultural Consortia) for the production, field testing and distribution of the improved varieties of maize.

After his death he was succeeded as director of the "Maize experimental station" by Luigi Fenaroli, who devoted his care to the Italian introduction of hybrid maize technology.

Zapparoli's work is described in 37 publications of the Stazione sperimentale di maiscoltura, printed from 1921 to 1943. Italian farmers established the Fondazione Tito V. Zapparoli, in order to perpetuate his memory. The Foundation is in charge of the conservation and multiplication of genetic materials for the production of high yielding maize varieties and hybrids.

== See also ==
- Aureliano Brandolini
