= Accademia dei Georgofili =

Italian learned society

Coordinates: 43°46′06.7″N 11°15′18.2″E

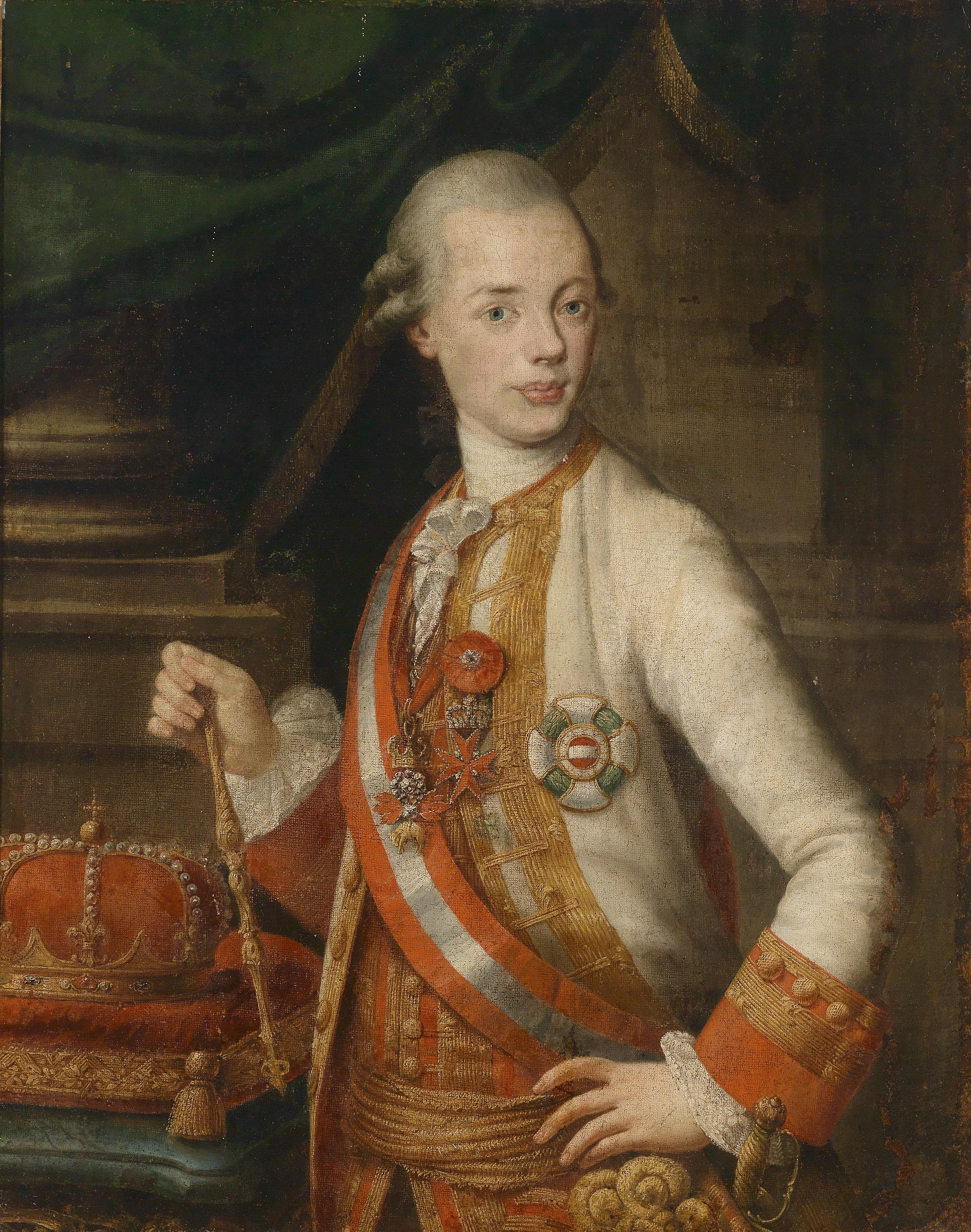
Peter Leopold, Grand Duke of Tuscany, the protector of the Academy of Georgofili, by Pompeo Batoni

The Accademia dei Georgofili is an Italian learned society in Florence, in Tuscany in central Italy. It was established in 1753 to promote, among scholars and landowners, the study of agronomy, forestry, economy, geography and agriculture. It publishes a journal, the Rivista di storia dell'Agricoltura.

== History ==
The Academy of Georgofili was established in Florence at the beginning of June 1753 as a response to an essay by the abbot Ubaldo Montelatici of the order of Canons Regular of the Lateran, who proposed new horizons of agricultural research. It originated from the need to improve agricultural production through rational utilisation of the soil. In 1783 it merged with the Botany Society and received in concession the Giardino dei Semplici (medicinal herb garden). With the Grand Duke Peter Leopold of Lorraine, who granted it his protection, the academy acquired notable prestige. It brought to attention many issues facing agriculture and agricultural economics, including the renewal of agricultural equipment, education, cattle, tenant farming, draining of swampland, land reclamation, grain marketing, etc. In 1768, Luigi Tramontini earned the second prize in a contest seeking ways to increase livestock in Tuscany.

The early years of the Academy was not marked by activities of special importance, the association rose to national importance by the nineteenth century, due to the studies in plow by Raffaello Lambruschini and activities and research by Cosimo Ridolfi, one of the leading agronomists of the age of the Italian unification. Ridolfi proposed the reflection of greater clarity of the agronomic, geographic, economic, and social future of the land of hills that were for centuries the heart of Italian society, being marginalized by the advent of mechanized agriculture on the plains of Europe.

In addition to studies of Ridolfi, the Academy was fruitfully engaged in the nineteenth century, in the production of wine and an awareness of the poor quality of a great majority of Italian wines, and the need to radically change the technology of the cellar on the forms on the pomological, and thus was born the largest catalog of varieties of fruit on the Peninsula, the Pamona of George Gallesio.

On the night between 26 and 27 May 1993, an explosive device was set off in a Fiat Fiorino packed with explosives near the historic Tower of the Pulci, killing five people and wounding 48 others. The blast caused damage to the library of the academy, resulting in three years of restoration work in order to restore the building to its former state. The incident became known as the Via dei Georgofili bombing.

== Historical archives and library ==
The historical archives covering the period of 1753-1911, with a total of over 12,000 manuscripts preserved, and the library is equipped with 70,000 volumes.

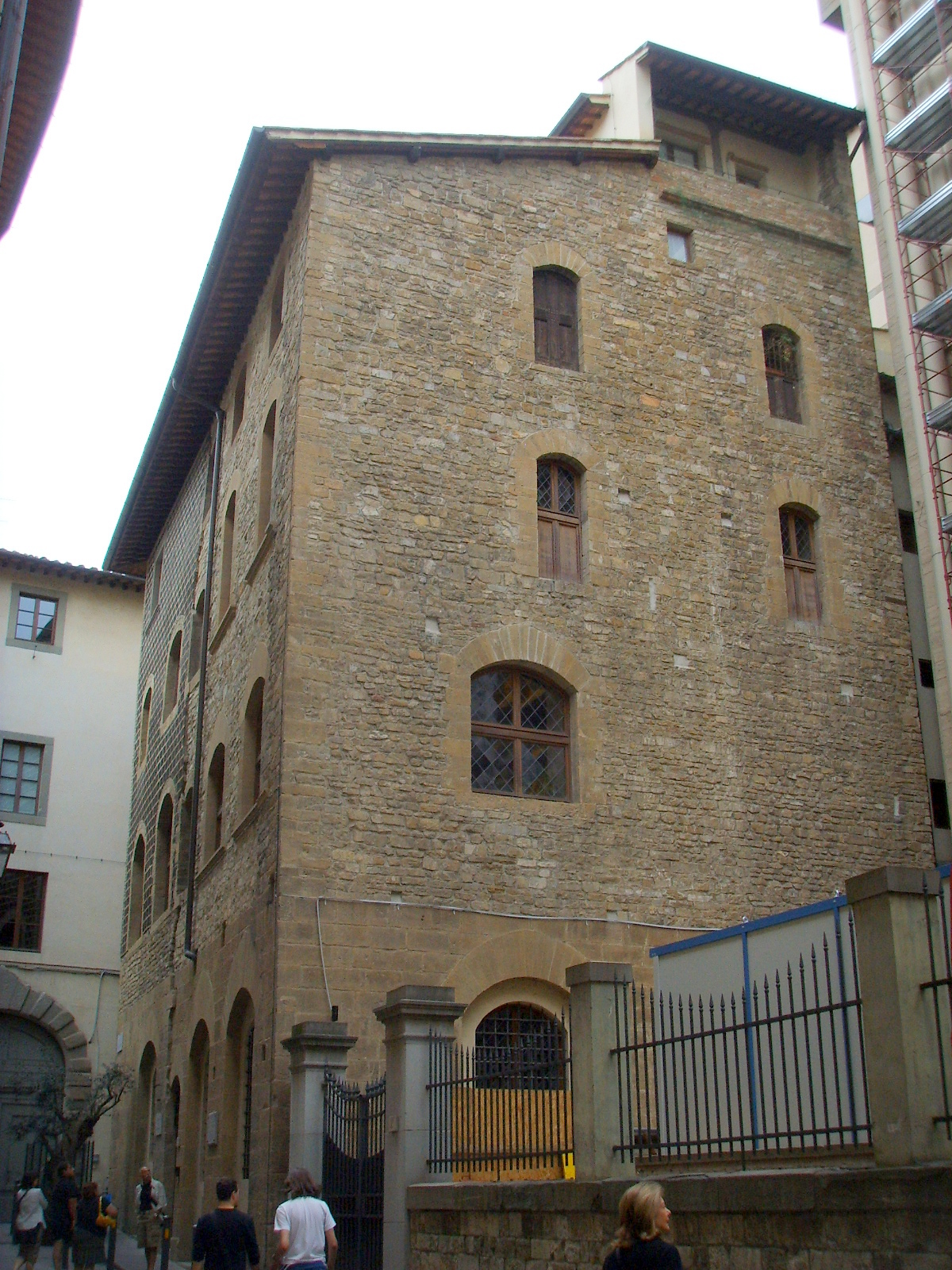
The Torre dei Pulci, seat of the archive of the academy; rebuilt after bombing in 1993

== Name, motto, and emblem ==
The term Georgofili comes from the Greek, and literally means "Earth-work-lovers", meaning "devotees of agriculture". The emblem of the academy contains the symbols of agricultural activity, dedicated to the goddess Ceres (i.e. an ear of grain, an olive branch, and a cluster of grapes) as well as those associated with economy activities and commerce dedicated to Mercury (caduceus, intertwined snakes and wings).

The motto of the academy is Prosperitati publicae augendae (To increase the wealth of the state) and highlights how the activities of the Georgofili are towards public interest.

== List of presidents ==
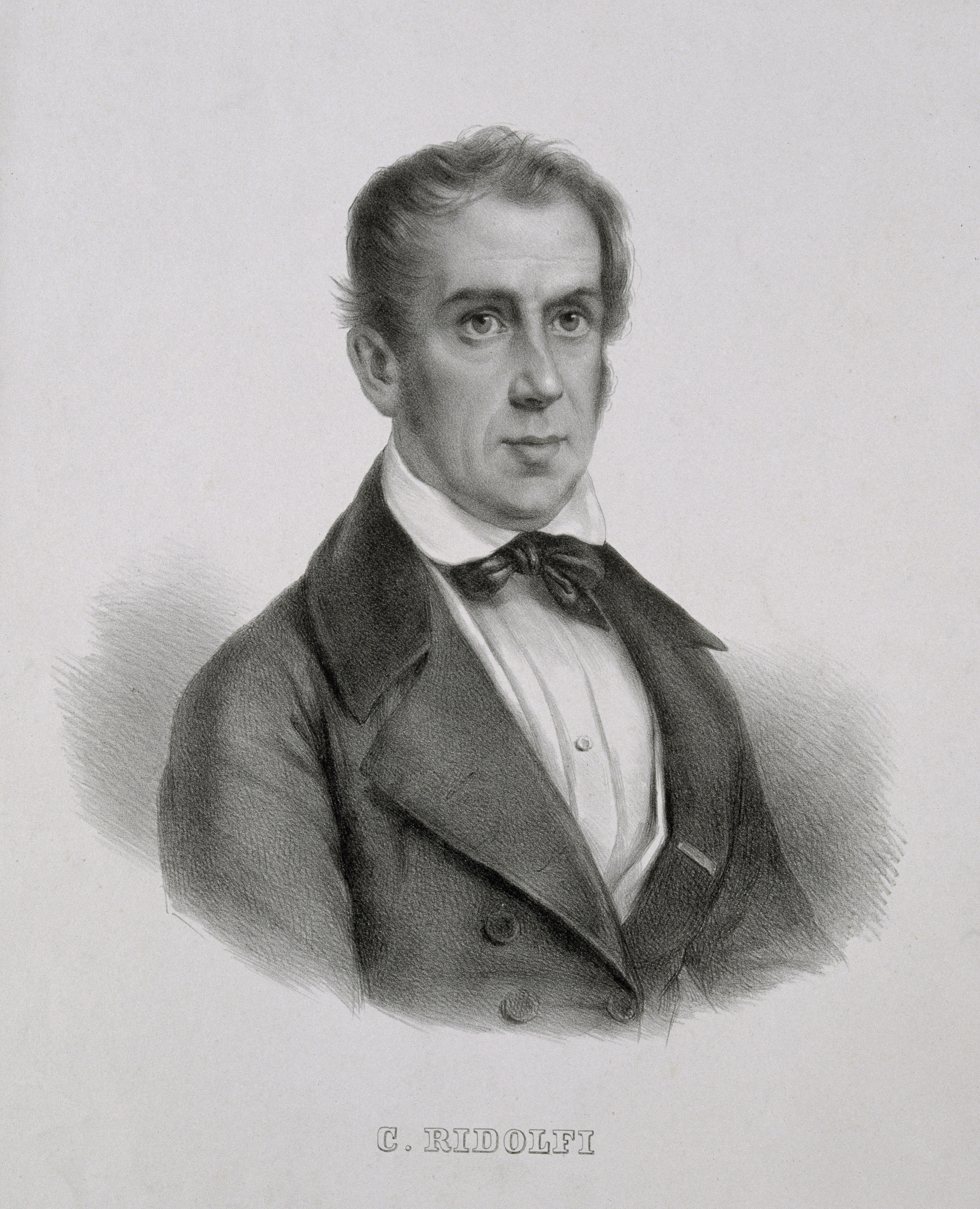
Marquis Cosimo Ridolfi, president of the academy 1842-1865

- Ubaldo Montelatici, tutor (4 June 1753)
- Emmanuel de Nay, Count of Richecourt (1753–1757)
- Giovan Gualberto Franceschi (1757–1758)
- Roberto Pucci (1758–1767)
- Francesco Orsini Rosenberg (1767)
- Giuseppe Rospigliosi (1797–1801)
- Ubaldo Ferroni (1801–1821)
- Paul Garzoni Venturi (1821–1842)
- Marquis Cosimo Ridolfi (1842–1865)
- Raphael Lambruschini (1865–1871)
- Luigi Ridolfi (1871–1909)
- Francesco Guicciardini (1909–1913)
- Carlo Ridolfi (1915–1918)
- Riccardo Dalla Volta (1918–1926)
- Arrigo Serpieri (1926–1944)
- Francesco Bertolino, Commissioner (1944–1946)
- Renzo Giuliani (1946–1962)
- Gasparini Marino (1963–1977)
- Joseph Stefanelli (1977–1986)
- Franco Scaramuzzi (since 1986)
