= Giovanni Ticozzi =

Italian classical scholar (1897–1958)

Giovanni Ticozzi (1897, Pasturo – 19 February 1958, Lecco) was an Italian priest, educator and ancient languages scholar

Born in a village in the Valsassina Valley in the Italian Alps, he became a consecrated priest in 1923 and taught ancient languages and civilization at Liceo Alessandro Manzoni, a classical high school, in Lecco.

He directed his own high school from 1941 to 1958, but for the time spent in jail, having been arrested for participating in the Italian war of liberation. At the end of 1943 he was appointed president of the Comitato di Liberazione Nazionale (National Liberation Committee) in Lecco, as a representative of the Catholic civil society. Arrested on October 30, 1944, in Lecco, he was held at the San Donnino prison in Como and on December 22 he was moved to the San Vittore jail in Milan. A few days later he was condemned by the Special Judicature. He was freed thanks to Ildefonso Schuster, Milan archbishop. He spent the rest of the Second World War in a small village by Lake Como, and resumed his position at Liceo Alessandro Manzoni school on May 7, 1945.

A widely appreciated educator, classical scholar in Greek and Latin, and a Lecco public figure after the Second World War, where he organized a cultural center, devoted to literature, and published Frammenti di Vita, a book of his recollections. He died on February 19, 1958, sitting at his work desk.
