= Aureliano Brandolini =

Italian agronomist (1927–2008)

Aureliano Brandolini (August 8, 1927 – September 5, 2008) was an Italian agronomist and development cooperation scholar.

Born in Calolziocorte, Italy, after studying at Liceo Alessandro Manzoni high school in Lecco with Giovanni Ticozzi, he graduated in agriculture at the University of Milan in 1950 and specialized in plant breeding and microtechnique at the Department of Botany and Agronomy at Iowa State University, in the United States, graduating in 1955.

Brandolini was the research director of the "Istituto di ricerche orticole" (Horticultural research institute) and of the "Lombardy center for horto-flori-fruit-crops" in Minoprio (Italy) from 1964 to 1971 and of the Centro di ricerca fitotecnica in Bergamo from 1976 to 1983, developing and producing special maize hybrids in Europe and Latin America, and from 1983 to 1993 work as general director of the Istituto agronomico per l'oltremare in Florence, managing the agricultural development projects of the Italian Ministry of Foreign Affairs. He was a member of the Accademia di Agricoltura di Torino in Turin, Italy and of the Academia Nacional de Agronomia y Veterinaria in Buenos Aires, Argentina.

Under the supervision of his teacher Luigi Fenaroli, his early studies were in the field of to the collection, characterization, and breeding of agricultural crops, and the biodiversity in Italy and Southern Europe. From 1958 to 1960 he assisted the Italian Trust Administration in Somalia on maize, sorghum, and sesame production. He organized technical assistance and coordinated hybrid maize introduction programs in Spain, Romania, Hungary, Yugoslavia, and other Southern European countries.

With Jean Aimé Baumann and Gonzalo Avila of the Geneva-based "Fundación Simón I. Patiño", he established the Centre ecofitogenetico and the "Seed Center" in Pairumani, Bolivia, in order to study agricultural genetic resources and the production of improved varieties of Andes ridge and tropical crops. In collaboration with Adolfo Pons and Giovanni C. Vandoni, he studied the agronomic, morphological, and cytological traits of maize from Ecuador, they later classified in 6 sections, 18 race complexes and 34 races. With Gonzalo Avila, A. Rodríguez, A.G. Brandolini, and other researchers he studied Bolivian traditional maize varieties, classifying 7 race complexes, 28 races and 108 agro-ecotypes.

He studied the history of maize in Italy during 2005 and 2006, and characterized the traditional Italian varieties of the crop, by establishing the phylogenetic relations between the original American varieties and those in Italy. He identified the migration routes of maize from the New to the Old World. His classification of the germplasm of the 562 accessions of Italian traditional maize varieties resulted in the description and classification of 10 race complexes, 37 races, and 77 agro-ecotypes.

== See also ==
- Biodiversity
- International Potato Center
- Istituto agronomico per l'oltremare
