= Antonio Cottone =

Member of the Sicilian Mafia

- Born: 1904/1905; Villabate, Sicily, Italy
- Died: 22 August 1956 (aged 51–52); Villabate
- Cause of death: Shot and killed by rival Mafia faction
- Known for: Mafia boss of Villabate
- Allegiance: Sicilian Mafia

Antonio Cottone (Italian pronunciation: [anˈtɔːnjo kotˈtoːne]; 1904/1905 – 22 August 1956) was a member of the Sicilian Mafia in his hometown Villabate in the province of Palermo, Sicily. He was known as 'U Patre Nostru (Our Heavenly Father) due to his alleged generosity. The Cottone clan was a historical Mafia family. They were mentioned in 1937 as the Mafia bosses of Villabate by Melchiorre Allegra, a mafioso physician who became an informant when he was arrested.

== Influential Mafia boss ==
Antonio Nino Cottone had worked for the Profaci brothers in New York City and was deported back to Sicily. He became the boss of Villabate where the Profaci family originated. Cottone was not only influential in his own town but in Palermo as well. After the Allied invasion of Sicily during World War II (Operation Husky), Cottone was made mayor of Villabate by the Allied Military Government of Occupied Territories (AMGOT) who looked for anti-fascist notables to replace fascist authorities. Local townspeople remember that when Cottone made his walk along Villabate’s main street every morning and every afternoon he was “revered and honoured by many citizens that almost prostrated themselves at his feet.”

A onetime butcher who prospered mightily during the U.S. occupation of Sicily, Nino Cottone was respected for his wealth and for his excellent connections in the Christian Democrat party (DC—Democrazia Cristiana). The foundation of Nino's respectability was that he was a boss of the "Mafia of the Gardens"—the section of Cosa Nostra that "protects" Palermo's fruit market men and citrus growers. Cottone also ran the meat supply to Palermo's wholesale market and got his meat from cattle thief Luciano Leggio from Corleone, who he introduced on the Palermo market. Cottone also mediated the peace in the violent vendetta within the Greco Mafia clan between the factions of Ciaculli and Croceverde Giardini. The daughter of Nino Cottone, Maria Cottone, married Salvatore "The Senator" Greco.

== Palermo wholesale market war ==
In January 1955, the Palermo fruit and vegetable wholesale market moved from the Zisa area to Acquasanta, disturbing the delicate power balances within Cosa Nostra. The Acquasanta Mafia clan tried to muscle in on the protection racket that traditionally belonged to the "Mafia of the Gardens"—such as the Greco’s and Cottone—because it now fell under their territory. Some villages just outside Palermo, like Bagheria and Villabate, flared up with the same kind of violence for the control of irrigation, transport, and wholesale markets. A violent dispute erupted leaving bodies on both sides. Acquasanta bosses Gaetano Galatolo and Nicola D’Alessandro were killed, as well as Francesco Greco from the Ciaculli clan, a major wholesaler of fruit and vegetables, were killed in a dispute over the protection rackets.

On 22 August 1956, Nino Cottone was killed as well. Returning home late, he gently backed his little Fiat station wagon into the drive of his summer villa. He had just locked the car when he was bowled along the driveway by two streams of machine-gun bullets. He was hit by six bullets and managed to reach his house where he collapsed. The next day Angelo Galatolo, brother of Gaetano, was killed as well. The reason for his killing remained unclear, but was probably linked to the struggle over control of the Palermo wholesale market. At his funeral people participated in mass, a veritable human flood. In the presence of many people from Palermo and from neighbouring towns, the funeral of the victim took place in grand style.

== Heroin trafficking ==
Cottone might have been involved in trafficking heroin to the U.S.; Joe Profaci had returned to Villabate in 1947 to visit his former lieutenant. In 1956, Profaci, in Brooklyn (New York City), was recorded talking about the export of Sicilian oranges with Nino Cottone, in Sicily. Cottone might have lost his life that year in the battle for the Palermo wholesale market, but Profaci's oranges kept on coming. The Brooklyn number rung by Cottone was the same number rung by Lucky Luciano from Naples and Frank Coppola from Anzio. All conversations talking ecstatically about high-grade Sicilian oranges were recorded by the Palermo police. In 1959, US Customs intercepted one of those orange crates. Hollow wax oranges, 90 to a crate, were filled with heroin until they weighed as much as real oranges. Each crate carried 110 pounds of pure heroin.

== Sources ==
- (in Italian) Caruso, Alfio (2000). Da cosa nasce cosa. Storia della mafia dal 1943 a oggi, Milan: Longanesi ISBN 88-304-1620-7
- Dickie, John (2004). Cosa Nostra. A history of the Sicilian Mafia, London: Coronet, ISBN 0-340-82435-2
- Lewis, Norman (1964/2003). Honoured Society: The Sicilian Mafia Observed, London: Eland, ISBN 0-907871-48-8
- Lupo, Salvatore (2009). History of the Mafia, New York: Columbia University Press, ISBN 978-0-231-13134-6
- Schneider, Jane T. & Peter T. Schneider (2003). Reversible Destiny: Mafia, Antimafia, and the Struggle for Palermo, Berkeley: University of California Press ISBN 0-520-23609-2
- Servadio, Gaia (1976). Mafioso. A history of the Mafia from its origins to the present day, London: Secker & Warburg OCLC 436-44700-2 ISSN 0336-9196
- (in Italian) Oliva, Ernesto & Salvo Palazzolo (2001). L'altra mafia: biografia di Bernardo Provenzano, Soveria Mannelli: Rubbettino Editore, ISBN 978-88-498-0107-1
- (in Italian) Tesauro, Giuseppina (2013). Dai giardini della Conca d'Oro all'impresa: La mafia vista dal microcosmo di Villabate, Palermo: Centro di studi ed iniziative culturali Pio La Torre
