= Greco Mafia clan =

Historically one of the most influential Mafia clans in Sicily

- Family tree depicting the two branches of the Greco family, from Crovecerde-Giardini and Ciaculli.
- Founded: Late 19th century
- Named after: Greco family
- Founding location: Ciaculli and Croceverde Giardini, two south-eastern outskirts of Palermo
- Years active: Decline in the 2000s but still active with a very strong influence
- Territory: Mostly Ciaculli and Croceverde Giardini. However, for periods of the 20th century they exerted influence throughout Sicily.
- Ethnicity: Sicilians
- Activities: Control over the Palermo wholesale market; Cigarette smuggling; Heroin trafficking; money laundering
- Allies: Uneasy alliance with the Corleonesi (Second Mafia War 1981-1983)
- Rivals: Acquasanta Mafia clan (Palermo wholesale market war in the mid 1950s); La Barbera brothers (First Mafia War in the early 1960s)
- Notable members: Giuseppe Greco, aka "Piddu u tinenti" (Piddu the lieutenant); Salvatore "Ciaschiteddu" Greco; Salvatore "The Engineer" Greco; Michele Greco aka The Pope; Salvatore "The Senator" Greco

The Greco Mafia family (Italian pronunciation: [ˈɡrɛːko]) is historically one of the most influential Mafia clans in Sicily, from the late 19th century. The extended family ruled both in Ciaculli and Croceverde Giardini, two south-eastern outskirts of Palermo in the citrus growing area. Members of the family were important figures in the Sicilian Cosa Nostra. Salvatore "Ciaschiteddu" Greco was the first ‘secretary’ of the Sicilian Mafia Commission, while one of his successors was Michele Greco, also known as Il Papa ("The Pope") due to his ability to mediate between different Mafia families.

According to the pentito Antonio Calderone "the Grecos effectively exercised power in the whole of Sicily." According to Giovanni Brusca the Greco family was very important and the ones who tipped the balance in every internal Mafia war.

== Early history ==
Both family groups probably had a common ancestor in Salvatore Greco who was mentioned in the Sangiorgi report at the turn of the 20th century as the capomafia of Ciaculli.

The boss of the Croceverde Giardini, Giuseppe Greco, also known as "Piddu u tinenti" (Piddu the lieutenant), was gabelloto of I Giardini, an estate of about 300 hectares of citrus orchards, in particular the tangerines that make the area of Croceverde and Ciaculli famous.

The Grecos were typical representatives of the rural Mafia. In 1916, they ordered the murder of a priest who had denounced the Mafia's interference in the administration of ecclesiastical revenues and charity funds during a Sunday sermon. In 1921, a Greco who had suffered a sgarro (a personal affront) killed two shepherds along with their flock of sheep. In 1929, a Greco fired twenty bullets into an enemy's great casks of wine and then sat down amid the foaming splinters to smoke his pipe.

== The Greco War: interfamily feud ==
In 1939 a bloody vendetta between both clans started during a brawl about a question of honour among youngsters of the two clans. The son of Giuseppe Greco, also known as "Piddu u tinenti" (Piddu the lieutenant), the boss of Croceverde Giardini cosca, was killed. In 1946-47, the bloody internal feud between the factions in Ciaculli and Croceverde Giardini reached a climax. On August 26, 1946, Giuseppe Greco, the boss of the Ciaculli clan and a brother-in-law of "Piddu u tinenti", and his brother Pietro Greco were killed with machine guns and grenades. The Ciaculli faction reacted a few months later when two of Piddu the lieutenant's men were shot with a lupara, the typical Sicilian short-barrelled shotgun. In revenge the Giardini cosca kidnapped two members of the rival faction who were never seen again, a so-called lupara bianca.

The struggle between the clans came to a peak with a full-scale gunfight in the main square of Ciaculli on September 17, 1947. First, an important member of the Giardini cosca was shot down by a machine gun. When it became clear he was not dead yet, two women of the Ciaculli clan, Antonina (51) and Rosalia (19) the widow and daughter of one of the bosses killed the year before, went down into the street and finished the victim off with kitchen knives. In return, the brother and sister of the victim shot the women; Antonina was wounded and her daughter killed. Their attacker was then shot and killed by Antonina's 18-year-old son.

In total, eleven members of the two clans died and several others were wounded in the feud, before other Palermo Mafia bosses started to put pressure on Piddu the lieutenant to end the bloody feud, which drew too much attention. Moreover, Piddu was expected to take care for both factions of the feuding clans, after the killing of the bosses of the rival faction. His status depended on how he would manage the situation.

== Mediation ==
Giuseppe Greco, also known as "Piddu u tinenti" (Piddu the lieutenant)

Piddu the lieutenant asked for mediation from Antonio Cottone, the boss of the Mafia family of Villabate, a town close to Ciaculli and Croceverde. Cottone, who had been deported from the US, was an influential mafioso both in Palermo as in his native village Villabate, and still had good connections in the US, in particular with Joe Profaci, who came from the same village. At the time, Profaci was in Sicily and it seems he played an important role in the peace negotiations.

The peace between the two rival factions of the Greco clan was settled by giving the rights of the Giardini estate to Salvatore "Ciaschiteddu" Greco (the son of Giuseppe Greco of Ciaculli) and his cousin Salvatore Greco, also known as "l'ingegnere" (The Engineer) or "Totò il lungo" (Totò the tall) (the son of Pietro Greco of Ciaculli). They became co-owners of a citrus fruit export business and partners in a bus company.

Historians are sceptical about the blood feud theory of the struggle. At stake was the control of the citrus plantations, the management of the citrus derivatives business and transport, as well as control over the wholesale markets in eastern Palermo. Six of the victims in the war did not bear the Greco name. The blood feud legend was probably spread around to hide the real motives behind the struggle.

=== Descendants of the Ciaculli faction ===
Giuseppe Greco and Pietro Greco, of the Ciaculli faction, both had a son that became important mafiosi:

- Salvatore "Ciaschiteddu" Greco (the son of Giuseppe Greco and Santa Greco, the sister of Piddu the lieutenant)
- Salvatore Greco, (the son of Pietro Greco), also known as "l'ingegnere" (the engineer) or "Totò il lungo" (Totò the tall).

=== Descendants of the Croceverde Giardini faction ===
Giuseppe Greco, also known as "Piddu u tinenti", the boss of Croceverde Giardini faction, had two sons that rose to prominence in Cosa Nostra:

- Michele Greco also known as The Pope.
- Salvatore Greco also known as The Senator. He married the daughter of Nino Cottone, the peacemaker between the two factions.
- Leandro Greco, grandson of Michele Greco also known as The Prince.

Piddu the lieutenant asked for mediation from Antonio Cottone, the boss of the Mafia family of Villabate, a town close to Ciaculli and Croceverde. Cottone, who had been deported from the US, was an influential mafioso both in Palermo as in his native village Villabate, and still had good connections in the US, in particular with Joe Profaci, who came from the same village. At the time, Profaci was in Sicily and it seems he played an important role in the peace negotiations.

== Consolidation ==
Piddu the lieutenant withdrew from active life as a mafioso and settled in a modern house in Palermo, where he consolidated and expanded his friendships among the ‘accepted’ section of society, protecting his younger relations when they got into trouble with the law. His influence in the higher circles of Palermo was considerable. Cardinal Ernesto Ruffini accepted an invitation of Piddu Greco to bless the new church of Croceverde-Giardini and a dinner afterwards.

The Grecos were protagonist in the violent conflict about the Palermo fruit and vegetable wholesale market that was moved from the Zisa area to Acquasanta near the port in January 1955, disturbing the delicate power balances within Cosa Nostra. The Acquasanta Mafia clan tried to muscle in on the protection racket that traditionally belonged the "Mafia of the Gardens" — such as the Grecos and Cottone — because it now fell under their territory. The bosses of the Acquasanta Mafia clan, Gaetano Galatolo and Nicola D’Alessandro, as well as Francesco Greco from the Ciaculli clan, a major wholesaler of fruit and vegetables, were killed in a dispute over the protection rackets.

Some villages just outside Palermo, like Bagheria and Villabate, flared up with the same kind of violence for the control of irrigation, transport, and wholesale markets. On August 22, 1956, Nino Cottone was killed as well. In the end the Acquasanta had to split the profits of the wholesale market racket with the Greco Mafia clan of Ciaculli, who traditionally controlled fruit and vegetable supply to Palermo wholesale market.

== On the Commission ==
Although descendants of the old, established rural Mafia, the cousins Salvatore "Ciaschiteddu" Greco and Salvatore "The Engineer" Greco quickly learned to profit from the post-war economic boom and became involved in cigarette smuggling and heroin trafficking. They both participated at the Grand Hotel des Palmes Mafia meeting in October 1957 between prominent American and Sicilian mafiosi. Heroin trafficking between these two groups might have been discussed, but there certainly was not a general agreement on the heroin trade between the Sicilian Mafia and the American Cosa Nostra, as is often suggested.

At one of the meetings American Mafia boss Joe Bonanno suggested the Sicilians to form a Sicilian Mafia Commission to avoid violent disputes, following the example of the American Mafia that had formed their Commission in the 1930s. The Sicilians agreed and Tommaso Buscetta, Gaetano Badalamenti and Salvatore "Ciaschiteddu" Greco set the ground rules. Somewhere in 1958 the Sicilian Mafia composed its first Mafia Commission. "Ciaschiteddu" Greco was appointed as its first segretario (secretary), essentially a "primus inter pares" – the first among equals. That position came to him almost naturally because he headed one of the most influential Mafia clans at the time. The Commission, however, was not able to prevent the outbreak of a violent Mafia War in 1962.

== First Mafia War ==
The cousins Salvatore "Ciaschiteddu" Greco and Salvatore "The Engineer" Greco of the Ciaculli family were also protagonists in the First Mafia War between rival clans in Palermo in the early 1960s for the control of the profitable opportunities brought about by rapid urban growth and the illicit heroin trade to North America. The conflict was sparked by a quarrel over an underweight shipment of heroin and the murder of Calcedonio Di Pisa – an ally of the Grecos – in December 1962. The Grecos suspected the brothers Salvatore and Angelo La Barbera of the attack.

The clash between the Grecos and the La Barberas involved an old and a new Mafia. According to Antimafia judge Cesare Terranova the Grecos "represented the traditional Mafia, the Mafia in trappings of respectability … and they are linked by a dense network of friendships, interests, and protections with the leading Mafiosi of the Palermo area. They occupy a position of preeminence in the sector of cigarette and drug smugglers. The La Barberas, in contrast, come out of obscurity and their power consists especially in their enterprising ways and their following – a determined band of professional killers."

On June 30, 1963 a car bomb exploded near Grecos' house in Ciaculli, killing seven police and military officers sent to defuse it after an anonymous phone call. The outrage over the Ciaculli Massacre changed the Mafia war into a war against the Mafia. It prompted the first concerted anti-mafia efforts by the state in post-war Italy. The Sicilian Mafia Commission was dissolved and of those mafiosi who had escaped arrest many went abroad. Even the old Piddu Greco was arrested in October 1965, and send into internal banishment from Sicily in May 1966.

The repression caused by the Ciaculli Massacre disarranged the Sicilian heroin trade to the United States. Mafiosi were banned, arrested and incarcerated. Control over the trade fell into the hands of a few fugitives: the Greco cousins, Pietro Davì, Tommaso Buscetta and Gaetano Badalamenti.

Salvatore "The Engineer" and "Ciaschiteddu" Greco were sentenced in absentia to respectively 10 and 4 years in prison at the Trial of the 114 in 1968 that was initiated as the result of the First Mafia War, but as they had been on the run since 1963, they did not serve a day. "Ciaschiteddu" Greco had moved to Venezuela, and the whereabouts of "The Engineer" were completely unknown. In 1973 they were both given the maximum period of five years of internal banishment at the remote island of Asinara, but they were nowhere to be found.

== Re-emergence ==
In the 1970s the Mafia recuperated. This time it was the Grecos from Croceverde who rose to prominence. The brothers Michele Greco and Salvatore Greco operated low profile and were able to enter into relationships with businessmen, politicians, magistrates and law enforcement officials through their membership of Masonic lodges. Salvatore Greco's nickname was "The Senator" for his political connections. He was the kingmaker of Christian Democrat politicians such as Giovanni Gioia, Vito Ciancimino and Giuseppe Insalaco. Bankers and other notables were invited to wine and dine and take part in hunting parties at Michele Greco's estate La Favarella. The estate was also used as a refuge for mafiosi on the run, and to set up a heroin laboratory.

In 1974 the Sicilian Mafia Commission was restored under the leadership of Gaetano Badalamenti. Michele Greco was a member and in 1978 he was appointed as the head of the Sicilian Mafia Commission (Cupola), after its previous leader Gaetano Badalamenti was expelled in the run up to the Second Mafia War between the Corleonesi headed by Totò Riina, and the faction led by Stefano Bontade and Salvatore Inzerillo. In January 1978, the ailing "Ciaschiteddu" Greco came all the way from Venezuela to try to stop Gaetano Badalamenti, Giuseppe Di Cristina, Giuseppe Calderone and Salvatore Inzerillo from retaliating against the growing power of the Corleonesi. His efforts were in vain.

== Second Mafia War ==
Gradually, Michele Greco sided with the Corleonesi and according to some, was no more than a "puppet" for Corleonesi boss Totò Riina. The Corleonesi decimated their adversaries when the simmering conflict escalated into an all-out war after the killing of Stefano Bontade in 1981. According to Tommaso Buscetta Michele Greco would just nod his head and agree with virtually everything Riina said during meetings between the heads of various Mafia families.

During the Second Mafia War another offspring of the Greco clan rose to prominence: Giuseppe Greco, a distant relative of Salvatore and Michele Greco. Giuseppe Pino Greco was one of Totò Riina preferred hitmen and became a member of the Sicilian Mafia Commission as well. Although Michele Greco nominally was his boss and head of the Commission, he was treated by Pino Greco as an irrelevant old man, making clear Pino Greco held the real power, according to pentito Francesco Marino Mannoia. Greco's contempt for Cosa Nostra's leadership was such that he no longer attended the meetings of the Commission, sending his deputy Vincenzo Puccio instead.

== Decline ==
Towards the end of 1985, Giuseppe Greco vanished. He was murdered on the orders of Riina, who thought Greco was becoming too ambitious. Riina was apparently threatened by the way that a significant following of younger mobsters looked up to Greco and saw him as a potential future boss. Michele Greco was arrested on February 20, 1986, and joined the hundreds of defendants at the Maxi Trial. Greco gave testimony at the trial and to illustrate his standing as a supposedly honest citizen, he boasted of all the illustrious people he had entertained at his large estate, including a former chief prosecutor and police chiefs.

== Resized and restructured ==
The Greco clan lost its grip on the mandamento of Ciaculli, which was merged with Brancaccio and the leadership eventually was passed on, but its criminal presence emerged into Calabria in the late 1990s and with the turn of the new millennium, Interpol and FBI intel information showed that the reemergence of the Greco clan was strongly evident, the Grecos were no longer part of the power structures of Cosa Nostra but restructured their organization to adapt to the new ways of organized crime.

== The rising of new Commission ==
On 22 January 2019, all the new bosses of the new Commission were arrested by the police, including Leandro Greco, grandson of Michele Greco, also known as The Prince of The Pope. Before his arrest, Leandro Greco had been appointed the capomandamento of Ciaculli, according to the authorities he has the mentality of an old man in the body of a young man. Leandro Greco was subsequently subjected to the strict 41-bis prison regime, and the regent of the Ciaculli family became Giuseppe Greco "U Minnuni", the son of Salvatore "The Senator" Greco and Leandro Greco's cousin, who had been one of the members of the Corleonesi death squad during the 1980s mafia war. In 2021, Giuseppe Greco was arrested once again.

== Sources ==
- (in Italian) Caruso, Alfio (2000). Da cosa nasce cosa. Storia della mafia dal 1943 a oggi, Milan: Longanesi ISBN 88-304-1620-7
- Dickie, John (2004). Cosa Nostra. A history of the Sicilian Mafia, London: Coronet ISBN 0-340-82435-2
- Gambetta, Diego (1993).The Sicilian Mafia: The Business of Private Protection, London: Harvard University Press, ISBN 0-674-80742-1
- (in Italian) Lodato, Saverio (1999). Ho ucciso Giovanni Falcone. La confessione di Giovanni Brusca, Milan: Mondadori ISBN 88-04-55842-3
- Lupo, Salvatore (2009). History of the Mafia, New York: Columbia University Press, ISBN 978-0-231-13134-6
- Schneider, Jane T. & Peter T. Schneider (2003). Reversible Destiny: Mafia, Antimafia, and the Struggle for Palermo, Berkeley: University of California Press ISBN 0-520-23609-2
- Servadio, Gaia (1976). Mafioso. A history of the Mafia from its origins to the present day, London: Secker & Warburg ISBN 0-436-44700-2
- Sterling, Claire (1990), Octopus. How the long reach of the Sicilian Mafia controls the global narcotics trade, New York: Simon & Schuster, ISBN 0-671-73402-4
- Stille, Alexander (1995). Excellent Cadavers. The Mafia and the Death of the First Italian Republic, New York: Vintage ISBN 0-09-959491-9
