= Marchese (disambiguation) =

Marchese is a hereditary title of nobility.

Marchese may also refer to:

- Marchese dialect, a dialect of France
- Marchese (constructor), an American racecar constructor
- Colle Del Marchese, a frazione (small village) in Perugia, Italy

== People with the surname Marchese ==
- Brady Marchese, American football player
- Carl Marchese (1905–1984), American racecar driver
- David Marchese, Canadian journalist
- Egidio Marchese (born 1968), Italian wheelchair curler, Paralympian 2006 and 2010
- Filippo Marchese (died 1982), Sicilian Mafia boss
- Giuseppe Marchese (born 1962), Sicilian Mafioso and nephew of Filippo Marchese
- Marisara Pont Marchese (b. 1941), Puerto Rican public figure
- Rosario Marchese (born 1952), Canadian politician
