= Giuseppe Marchese =

Member of the Sicilian Mafia

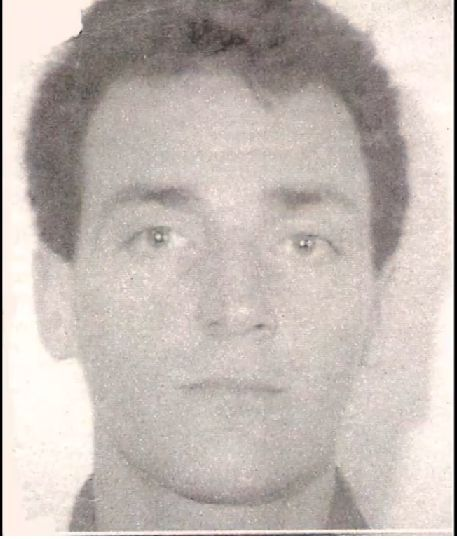
Giuseppe Marchese in 1982

Giuseppe Marchese (born 12 December 1963) is a former member of the Sicilian Mafia, who turned state witness (pentito). Giuseppe Pino Marchese was born in Palermo in a family with long-standing ties to the Mafia. His father Vincenzo and his uncle Filippo Marchese were both members of Cosa Nostra.

== Early Mafia career ==
He learned the hard way what it meant to be born into a Mafia family. When he was 16 he wanted to marry a girl. However, her parents were separated, which, according to the rules of Cosa Nostra, was not allowed. Giuseppe’s brother made the suggestion that he "clean up the family mess" and marry an orphan instead of the daughter of separated parents. In other words, Giuseppe was supposed to kill his girlfriend’s father. If he would not do it, his brother would. Giuseppe broke off the relationship.

In 1980, just 17 years old, Giuseppe Marchese was initiated into the Mafia by Salvatore Riina and Leoluca Bagarella as ‘reserved’ man of honour affiliated with the Corleonesi. His membership of Cosa Nostra was to be kept confidential in order to work exclusively for Riina and his uncle. He became one of the many killers at the disposal of the Corleonesi in the Second Mafia War.

== Arrest ==
He was only 18 when he participated in the so-called "Christmas Massacre" when, on the afternoon of 25 December 1981, in Bagheria, three Mafiosi – including Giovanni Di Peri, the boss of Villabate – and an innocent bystander were murdered. Giuseppe Greco and Marchese's uncle Filippo Marchese also took part in the bloodshed.

Giuseppe Marchese was captured on 15 January 1982, and imprisoned for his role in the Christmas Massacre. His conviction was secured by the fact that his fingerprint was found on the steering wheel of one of the getaway cars (the forensic scientist, Dr. Paolo Giaccone, who found and identified the fingerprint was subsequently shot to death by Rosario Rotolo, one of Filippo Marchese's killers; at the Maxi Trial, Rotolo was convicted of this murder). Marchese was given a life sentence as part of the Maxi Trial in 1987.

== Betrayed by Riina ==
On 11 May 1989 Giuseppe Marchese and his brother Antonino battered to death Vincenzo Puccio, boss of the mandamento of Ciaculli and a fellow convict and hitman for the Corleonesi. Puccio had been plotting to overthrow the Corleonesi bosses, Salvatore Riina and Bernardo Provenzano.

Giuseppe and Antonino Marchese had been ordered to kill Puccio by Riina but were unaware that Riina, on the same day, had Puccio's brother murdered. It was a deliberate ploy by Riina to ensure the Marchese brothers were unable to claim they had carried out the killing of Vincenzo Puccio during a spontaneous act of self-defence. The two Marcheses were subsequently given additional life sentences.

== Pentito ==
In September 1992 he became a pentito and started to collaborate with the authorities. He claimed he was disillusioned by Riina's tactics of murder and treachery, complaining he had been used and then discarded by Riina. Marchese admitted to having participated in more than 20 murders, including those of Stefano Bontade and Salvatore Inzerillo. He was the second mafioso (after the Marino Mannoia) from the winning faction of the Corleonesi in the Second Mafia War to become a state witness. Although he wasn't involved, he also talked about Pino Greco's killing.

Giuseppe Marchese was a brother-in-law of Leoluca Bagarella from Corleone, who married his sister Vincenzina in 1991. According to pentito Toni Calvaruso, Vincenzina committed suicide on 12 May 1995, due to her depressive state after a series of miscarriages, her brother becoming a pentito and her husband's involvement with the death of Giuseppe Di Matteo.
