= Michele Greco =

Member of the Sicilian Mafia

Michele "The Pope" Greco
- Born: 12 May 1924; Ciaculli, Sicily, Italy
- Died: 13 February 2008 (aged 83); Rome, Italy
- Other name: Il Papa
- Occupation: Mafioso
- Spouse: Rosa Greco
- Children: 1
- Relatives: Salvatore "The Senator" Greco (brother); Salvatore "Ciaschiteddu" Greco (cousin)
- Status: Deceased (imprisoned from 1992)
- Allegiance: Sicilian Mafia
- Convictions: Mafia association Multiple murders
- Criminal charges: Mafia association Multiple murders
- Penalty: 6 terms of life imprisonment

Michele Greco (Italian: [miˈkɛːle ˈɡrɛːko]; 12 May 1924 – 13 February 2008) was a member of the Sicilian Mafia and a convicted murderer. Greco died in prison while serving multiple life sentences. His nickname was Il Papa ("The Pope") due to his ability to mediate between different Mafia families. Greco was the head of the Sicilian Mafia Commission.

== Rise to power ==
Michele Greco was part of the powerful Greco Mafia clan that ruled both in his native Ciaculli and in Croceverde Giardini, two suburbs close to Palermo. He took over the mandamento of Croceverde Giardini after his father Giuseppe Greco, "Piddu u tinenti", died. He was a cousin of Salvatore "Ciaschiteddu" Greco, the first "secretary" of the first Sicilian Mafia Commission that was formed sometime in 1958. Following the end of the First Mafia War and the Ciaculli massacre, Salvatore "Ciaschiteddu" Greco and his allies had to go into hiding, and this allowed the Grecos from Croceverde Giardini, led by Michele Greco, to become much more important within Cosa Nostra. He and his brother Salvatore "The Senator" Greco operated low profile and were able to enter into relationships with businessmen, politicians, magistrates and law enforcement officials through their membership of Masonic lodges.

Salvatore Greco's nickname was "The Senator" for his political connections. He was the kingmaker of Christian Democrat politicians such as Giovanni Gioia, Vito Ciancimino and Giuseppe Insalaco. Many of those notables were invited by "The Pope" and "The Senator" to wine and dine and take part in hunting parties at his estate La Favarella. The estate was also used as a refuge for mafiosi on the run, and to set up a heroin laboratory.

Greco, along with other Mafia families around Palermo, controlled a large portion of the water supply. He was financing the digging of his wells with government money. According to the law, landowners were only allowed to have wells for their own private use and all excess water belonged to the public. However, the city of Palermo issued regular contracts to buy water from Greco and other Mafia bosses for a third of the water supply. During the summer, when water was particularly scarce and badly needed for irrigation, Greco sold water at exorbitant prices. The perpetual shortage of water was maintained by the Mafia and their friends in the local government.

Another money-making scheme was collecting subsidies from the European Community for destroying citrus crops he had never grown. The EC, in order to limit production, paid farmers to destroy part of their production. Greco paid EC inspectors to falsify the records.

== Puppet boss ==
Michele Greco was nominated the head of the Sicilian Mafia Commission (Cupola) in 1978, after Gaetano Badalamenti was expelled. Greco gave the commission a façade of neutrality behind which the Corleonesi effectively hid their expansion. In 1981, Mafia bosses Stefano Bontade and Salvatore Inzerillo were murdered within a few weeks of each other in the midst of the Second Mafia War. Through his position within the Cupola, Michele Greco assumed indirect control of Stefano Bontade's Mafia family after his murder. Not long after, Greco invited a number of Bontade's allies for a meeting at his country estate. A couple of members the clan, Buscetta and Contorno, were suspicious and didn't go, but several mafiosi had gone and were killed.

As it turned out, Michele Greco had been allied with Salvatore Riina and the Corleonesi all along. Riina had used Greco's position on the commission to help banish Gaetano Badalamenti from the Mafia and then, after Riina ordered Bontade's 1981 murder, he had Greco oversee Bontade and Inzerillo's Mafia clans who were in control of a heroin distribution network in the United States.

One of the men who did not attend the fateful meeting at Greco's estate was Salvatore Contorno. He sensed trouble and soon went into hiding when the Mafia War broke out. He narrowly escaped death during an ambush by a Corleonesi hit squad led by Pino Greco "Scarpuzzedda" and Giuseppe Lucchese. While in hiding from both the authorities and the Corleonesi, Contorno sent anonymous letters to the police, revealing to the authorities information on the Mafia, its members, the various factions and the violent turmoil it was undergoing. Contorno was eventually arrested in 1983 and became an informant the following year, following Tommaso Buscetta's example.

Contorno's revelations in his letters to the police were the first time the authorities had really learned of Michele Greco's high-ranking membership of the Mafia. Previously he had just been regarded as a rather secretive landowner with a suspiciously high income, although he did come from a long line of mafiosi.

Greco was a powerful mafia boss, descended from a long line of mafiosi, but in the latter part of his criminal career he could be best described as little more than Riina's "puppet boss". According to pentito Tommaso Buscetta, Michele Greco, "given his bland and weak personality, was the perfect person to become head of the Commission so as not to stand in the way of Riina designs." Buscetta explained that during meetings between the heads of various Mafia families, Michele Greco would just nod his head and agree with virtually everything Riina said.

== Manhunt and capture ==
Mafia boss Michele Greco during the Maxi Trial.

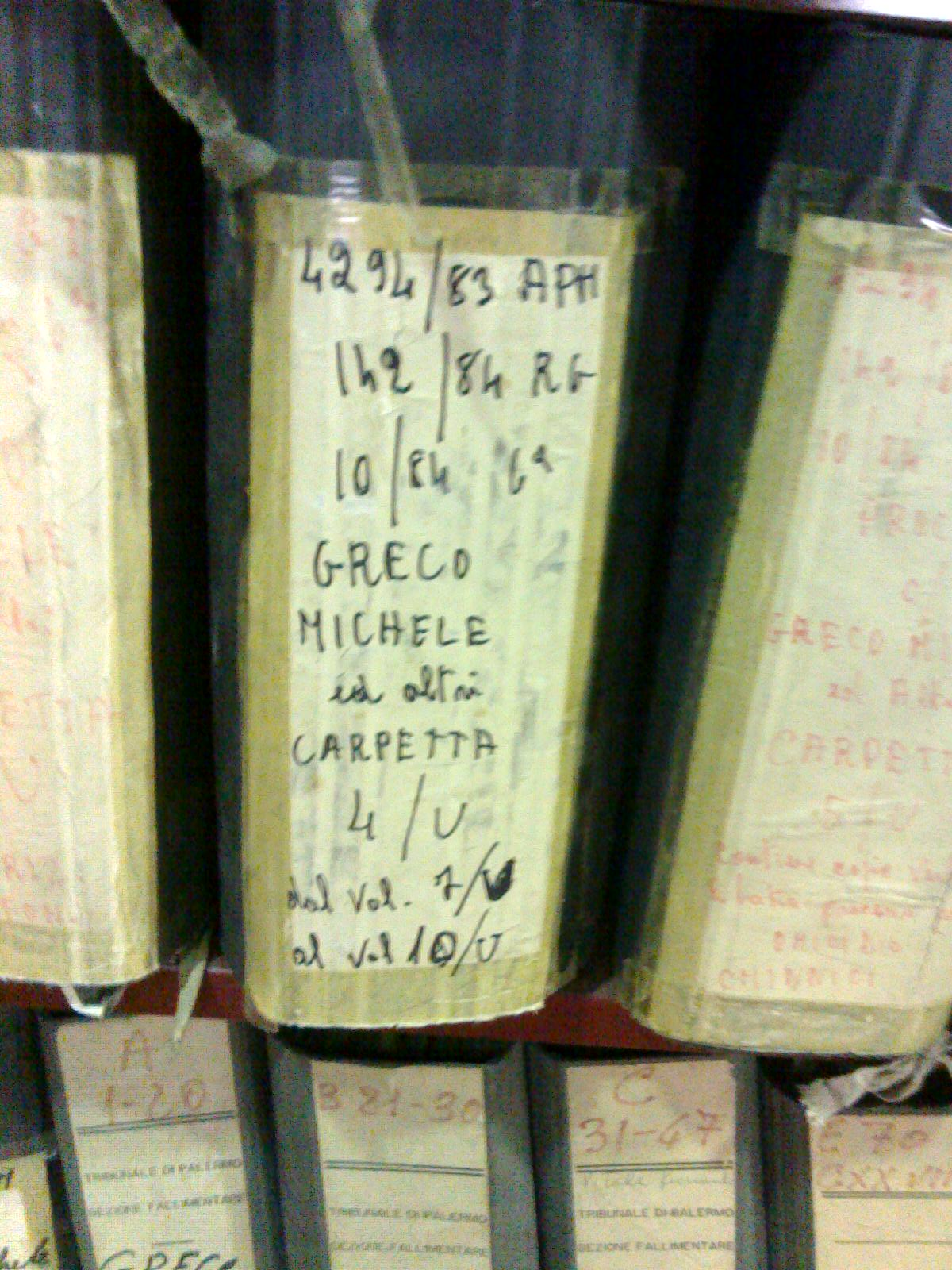
Documentation Centre about the Mafia, Corleone, Sicily.

Based on Salvatore Contorno's anonymous revelations, police chief Ninni Cassarà drew up a report in July 1982 listing 162 Mafiosi who warranted arrest, and the report was unofficially known as the 'Michele Greco + 161' report, signalling Greco's importance over the other suspects. On 6 August 1985, Ninni Cassarà and one of his bodyguards, Roberto Antiochia, were massacred by a team of up to fifteen gunmen outside Cassarà's home in front of his horrified wife and daughter.

The 'Michele Greco + 161' report was just the start of an investigation that was to become the Maxi Trial, where most of the leadership of the Mafia were tried for numberless crimes. On 9 July 1983, Greco was indicted by judge Giovanni Falcone, along with 14 others among which his brother Salvatore Greco, Totò Riina, Bernardo Provenzano and Nitto Santapaola for the murder on the prefect of Palermo, General Carlo Alberto Dalla Chiesa on 3 September 1982.

Michele Greco was arrested on 20 February 1986, and he joined the hundreds of defendants at the Maxi Trial, which had started just ten days previously. Greco was charged with ordering 78 murders, including those of the anti-Mafia magistrate Rocco Chinnici, Chinnici's two bodyguards and an innocent bystander, the four of whom had been killed by a car bomb in 1983.

Greco gave testimony at the trial where, like his co-defendants, he insisted he was innocent and knew nothing about any Mafia. To illustrate his standing as a supposedly honest citizen, he boasted of all the illustrious people he had entertained at his large estate, including a former chief prosecutor and police chiefs. He also admitted that Stefano Bontade had often hunted on his estate. Greco said that he and Bontade "were together on the Holy Friday, just days before his misfortune." The "misfortune" he referred to was Bontade being machine-gunned in the face by assassins while sitting in his car at a red traffic light.

At the end of the trial, on 16 December 1987, Greco, then aged 63, was found guilty on all charges and sentenced to life imprisonment.

== Imprisonment and death ==
The Maxi Trial was largely undone by notoriously generous appeals, mostly due to Corrado Carnevale, who would release Mafiosi on the slightest of pretexts, much to the frustration of the Maxi Trial's architects, Giovanni Falcone and Paolo Borsellino. Greco was released on appeal on 27 February 1991, but Giovanni Falcone, who had become head of the Penal Affairs section of the Italian Ministry of Justice, issued a decree that swiftly ordered the re-incarceration of Greco and other mafiosi.

In 1994, Greco was sentenced to another life sentence for the murder of Pietro Buscetta, brother-in-law of pentito Tommaso Buscetta, as well as three informants. In 1995, in the trial for the murder of Lieutenant Colonel Giuseppe Russo, Greco was sentenced to life imprisonment together with Bernardo Provenzano, Salvatore Riina, and Leoluca Bagarella. The same year, in the trial for the murders of the commissioners Giuseppe Montana and Antonino Cassarà, he was also sentenced to life imprisonment together with Bernardo Provenzano, Bernardo Brusca, Francesco Madonia and Salvatore Riina. The same year, in the trial for the murders of Piersanti Mattarella, Pio La Torre, Rosario Di Salvo and Michele Reina, in which he was given a further life sentence together with Bernardo Provenzano, Bernardo Brusca, Salvatore Riina, Giuseppe Calò, Francesco Madonia and Nenè Geraci. In 1997, in the trial for the murder of Judge Cesare Terranova, Greco received another life sentence along with Bernardo Provenzano, Bernardo Brusca, Giuseppe Calò, Nenè Geraci, Francesco Madonia and Salvatore Riina.

Greco never admitted his crimes nor his position in Cosa Nostra. In a letter sent to the press in the summer of 2007, he claimed he was "as innocent as a newborn child." He added that "Because of an injustice in the 1980s I have been buried alive and have been in prison for 22 years. The dampness of my cell has destroyed my health and I am truly in a bad way." He remained in prison in Rebibbia, Rome until his death from lung cancer on 13 February 2008.

According to historian John Dickie, Greco "was the very archetype of a mafia capo: unsmiling, taciturn, given to speaking only in maxims and allusive parables."

== Sources ==
- (in Italian) Caruso, Alfio (2000). Da cosa nasce cosa. Storia della mafia dal 1943 a oggi, Milan: Longanesi ISBN 88-304-1620-7
- Dickie, John (2004). Cosa Nostra. A history of the Sicilian Mafia, London: Coronet, ISBN 0-340-82435-2
- Schneider, Jane T. & Peter T. Schneider (2003). Reversible Destiny: Mafia, Antimafia, and the Struggle for Palermo, Berkeley: University of California Press ISBN 0-520-23609-2
- Stille, Alexander (1995). Excellent Cadavers: The Mafia and the Death of the First Italian Republic, New York: Vintage ISBN 0-09-959491-9
