= Filippo Marchese =

Sicilian Mafia hitman (1938–1982)

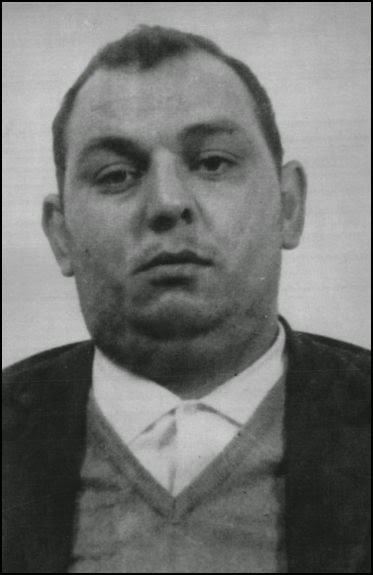
- Mugshot of Marchese, date unknown
- Born: 11 September 1938; Palermo, Italy
- Died: 10 September 1982 (aged 43); Palermo, Italy
- Allegiance: Corso dei Mille Mafia family / Cosa Nostra
- Criminal charge: Multiple murder
- Penalty: Life imprisonment (sentence in absentia and post mortem)

Filippo Marchese (11 September 1938 in Palermo – 10 September 1982 in Palermo) was a leading figure in the Sicilian Mafia and a hitman suspected of dozens of homicides. Marchese was one of the most feared killers working for mafia boss Vincenzo Chiaracane, closely related to the Giuseppe Greco family which was in control of the Ciaculli neighbourhood of Palermo.

He was the boss of the Mafia family in the Corso dei Mille neighbourhood in Palermo.

== Room of Death ==
Marchese ran what became known as the Room of Death, a small apartment along the Piazza Sant Erasmo. Victims who stood in the way of the Corleonesi, an alliance of Mafia families, were lured there to be murdered, usually by being garrotted. Their bodies were either dissolved in acid or chopped up and dumped out at sea. As many as 100 people – mafiosi who stood in the way of the Commission bosses, Michele Greco, Salvatore Riina and Bernardo Provenzano, and their associates – were killed there during the Second Mafia War.

=== Vincenzo Sinagra ===
Like most mafiosi, Filippo Marchese was very elusive, and the primary source of information about his career in crime comes from Vincenzo Sinagra, an informant. Sinagra was not a member of the Mafia but just a common criminal who, in 1981, made the mistake of stealing from a mafioso. He was given three choices; leave Sicily, die or become a gofer for the Corleonesi. He opted for the third option and ended up working with Marchese in the Room of Death.

Sinagra was arrested on 11 August 1982 when he was caught red-handed carrying out a contract killing, and after a year in custody he decided to become an informant and cooperated with the anti-Mafia judge Paolo Borsellino. He testified at the Maxi Trial of 1986–87, along with Tommaso Buscetta. Sinagra claimed at the Maxi Trial that it was invariably his job to hold the feet of those who died in the Room of Death while Marchese strangled them with a length of rope. Marchese was given an in absentia life sentence as part of the Maxi Trial in 1987, even though he was dead by then.

== Downfall ==
Marchese had been a valuable asset to the Corleonesi during the Second Mafia War in 1981–82. Afterwards, his violent nature was of no further use, and potentially marked him out as a threat to the leadership of the Commission bosses, Michele Greco and Salvatore Riina. Sometime in September 1982, Filippo Marchese was led, with a pretext, to a warehouse by Salvatore Montalto. There he met fellow killers Pino Greco, Giuseppe Giacomo Gambino and Salvatore Cucuzza, who quickly grabbed and strangled him. His body was subsequently dissolved in acid, like many of Marchese's own victims. In order to confuse and weaken the reaction of Marchese's friends and relatives, Riina and his allies put out the rumour that Marchese had accidentally shot himself while cleaning a gun, and had to be quietly buried due to his notoriety. Already during the Maxi Trial, there was speculation on whether he was dead, as Salvatore Contorno had learned, while in jail, that Marchese had been murdered, but the details surrounding his death were finally revealed when Cucuzza, one of his killers, became a pentito. Marchese's killer, Greco, himself was killed in 1985 by two of his own men on Toto Riina's orders, his underboss Vincenzo Puccio and a lieutenant, Giuseppe Lucchese, who later became boss of the Brancaccio-Ciaculli mandamento after Puccio was killed by Marchese's nephew Giuseppe Marchese in 1989, while Puccio was in prison. Giuseppe Giacomo Gambino, on the other hand, committed suicide in prison in 1996.

== Family and relatives ==
Filippo Marchese's two nephews, Antonino and Giuseppe Marchese, subsequently murdered Vincenzo Puccio in 1989 on Riina's orders, but then Riina deliberately destroyed their alibi. Giuseppe Marchese became a pentito in September 1992 after he realized his godfather and mentor Riina had betrayed him.

Marchese’s niece, Vincenza Marchese, was married to Leoluca Bagarella of the Corleonesi clan and Totò Riina's brother-in-law. Bagarella was rumoured to have killed his wife Vincenza sometime after her brother Giuseppe Marchese co-operated with the government and became a pentito (informant). When Bagarella was arrested on 24 June 1995 – after four years on the run with his wife – there was no sign of Vincenza, just a bunch of flowers in front of her picture on the mantelpiece – a sign of mourning. However, other sources said that Vincenza had committed suicide after her brother began collaborating with authorities. Another version was that she was clinically depressed, after a series of miscarriages. She had left a letter declaring her shame and asking her husband for forgiveness.
