= Antonino Mandalà =

Italian politician

- Born: March 25, 1939; Villabate, Italy
- Other names: Nino; "the Lawyer"
- Occupation: politician

Antonino Mandalà, also known as Nino or 'the Lawyer' (born 25 March 1939, Villabate), is an Italian mafioso and politician, member of Cosa Nostra and considered the head of the district of Villabate and supporter of Bernardo Provenzano.

== Biography ==
Born in Villabate and a law graduate, in 1979 he became a partner in the insurance brokerage company Sicilia Brokers along with Enrico La Loggia, Renato Schifani, and Benny D'Agostino. During the same period, he was an activist for the Christian Democracy party, procuring votes from mafia bosses. In 1994, he founded the first Forza Italia club in Villabate and at the same time worked for Cosa Nostra, particularly in the mandaments of Caccamo and Villabate, securing public contracts.

By 1997, he had secured contracts for the construction of a university residence in Catania and a Auchan supermarket with a Warner Bros. multiplex in Villabate.

On June 6, 1998, he was arrested for mafia association along with Forza Italia deputy Gaspare Giudice (who was later acquitted in 2007) but was released two years later due to expiration of detention terms and resumed his projects that had been halted by his arrest. On January 25, 2005, he was arrested again during Operation "Grande Mandamento," which led to the arrest of 82 supporters of the then-fugitive Bernardo Provenzano.

The informant Stefano Lo Verso reported to the magistrates about Mandalà's connections with former Minister of Agriculture in the Berlusconi IV government, Saverio Romano, while the informant Francesco Campanella accused Renato Schifani of having favored Mandalà in the modification of the Villabate zoning plan.

On April 27, 2007, he was sentenced in the first degree to eight years in prison for the events of 1998 and on September 28, 2011, he was sentenced to eight years in prison by the Court of Appeal of Palermo, but he was released due to the expiration of custody terms.

In 2009, he started his blog, which he manages with some interruptions and where he called on "free consciences" to abolish Article 41-bis and where he defended Silvio Berlusconi in 2010.

On November 17, 2011, during the third episode of Servizio Pubblico hosted by Michele Santoro, an interview with journalist Dina Lauricella and Mandalà was recreated.
