= Renato Schifani =

Italian politician (born 1950)

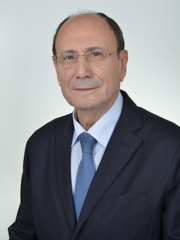

President of Sicily
- Incumbent
- Assumed office 13 October 2022
- Preceded by: Nello Musumeci

President of the Senate of the Republic
- In office 29 April 2008 – 14 March 2013
- Preceded by: Franco Marini
- Succeeded by: Pietro Grasso

Member of the Senate of the Republic
- In office 9 May 1996 – 12 October 2022
- Constituency: Monreale (1996–2006); Sicily (2006–2022)

Personal details
- Born: 11 May 1950 (age 76) Palermo, Italy
- Party: FI (since 2016)
- Other political affiliations: DC (until 1994); FI (1995–2009); PdL (2009–2013); NCD (2013–2016)
- Height: 1.7 m (5 ft 7 in)
- Education: University of Palermo
- Profession: Lawyer

Renato Maria Giuseppe Schifani (Italian pronunciation: [reˈnaːto skiˈfaːni]; born 11 May 1950) is an Italian politician who has served as the president of Sicily since 13 October 2022. Schifani was Silvio Berlusconi's chief whip and was a prominent member of the Senate of the Republic from 1996 to 2022. From 29 April 2008 to 14 March 2013, he was the president of the Senate of the Republic.

Initially a member of Christian Democracy, the ruling party of post-war Italy, Schifani joined Berlusconi's Forza Italia in 1995. He joined The People of Freedom when it succeeded FI as Berlusconi's party in 2009. He then joined the New Centre-Right party but left it in 2016 for the reformed Forza Italia. He won the 2022 Sicilian regional election and was elected president of the region.

During his career, Schifani has been the subject of Sicilian Mafia allegations. On at least two occasions, he had been associated with people who were convicted of Mafia offences, though Schifani has never been directly investigated or indicted for any Mafia-related matters.

== Early life and education ==
Schifani was born in Palermo on 11 May 1950. He graduated at the University of Palermo, becoming a lawyer. Since he became a lawyer in 1976, Schifani specialized in trials at Italy's Supreme Court of Cassation (Italian: Corte Suprema di Cassazione), the major court of last resort. He also specialized in real estate regulations and became active in the debt collecting business. Filippo Mancuso, the former Italian Minister of Justice also born in Palermo, termed Schifani "the prince of debt collectors" (il principe del recupero crediti).

== Political career ==
=== Silvio Berlusconi's chief whip ===
Prior to joining Forza Italia in 1995, Schifani was an active member of Christian Democracy (DC). In February 1995, he joined Forza Italia and became the regional manager of the party departments in Sicily. Elected in 1996 in the Altofonte−Corleone district in Sicily, he served as Silvio Berlusconi's chief whip in the Senate. During his first legislature, he was the group leader of Forza Italia in the Constitutional Affairs Commission at Palazzo Madama and was part of the Bicameral Commission for Reforms. Re-elected in 2001, he was confirmed the group leader of Forza Italia in the Senate. In 2002, Schifani was a protagonist in the attempt to secure the embedding of the provisional Article 41-bis prison regime, which is used against people imprisoned for particular crimes such as Mafia involvement, as a definitive measure in Italian law.

In 2006, Schifani was re-elected, this time in the Sicily-at large constituency, and confirmed the group leader of Forza Italia. He was member of the Territory and Environment Commission. He was re-elected in 2008, when he also became president of the Senate, and in 2013. On 19 March 2013, Schifano was appointed by acclamation as the group leader of Berlusconi's new party, The People of Freedom (PdL), in the Senate. On 15 November 2013, resigned as group leader of the PdL in the Senate. On 16 November 2013, he joined the New Centre-Right (NCD), of which on 5 December he became president of the promoting committee on 5 December 2013 and subsequently group leader of the Popular Area group in the Senate, which included NCD and the Union of the Centre (UDC). On 19 July 2016, Schifani resigned as group leader of Popular Area (NCD–UDC) group. On 4 August 2016, he joined the new Forza Italia, which had been established as the successor of the PdL in 2013, and thanked Berlusconi for welcoming him back. In 2018, he was re-elected senator and assigned as an effective member of the Constitutional Affairs Commission. He was also a member of the RAI Supervision Commission, the Bicameral Commission on the Banking System, and the Senate Rules Committee. In 2022, he did not seek re-election and instead ran for the presidency of Sicily.

=== 2004 immunity law ===
Schifani and Antonio Maccanico, senator of The Olive Tree, gave their name to a bill aimed at granting immunity to the top five representatives of the state, including the then Italian prime minister Silvio Berlusconi, who was the only one to not face trial. After extensive revisions of the text of the law by the Senate, Maccanico withdraw his name from the project. The lodo Schifani decree was then approved in June 2003 by the Italian Parliament guaranteeing immunity to Silvio Berlusconi. The law was subsequently declared unconstitutional by the Constitutional Court on 13 January 2004.

Similar provisions were included in the lodo Alfano (2008), granting immunity to the top four representatives of the state, including Berlusconi and the same Schifani as speaker of the Senate. After being granted immunity, Schifani sued his critics including journalists and writers, such as Marco Travaglio and Antonio Tabucchi, for slander, claiming €1.3 million from Tabucchi during the AnnoZero television programme on 5 February 2009. The lodo Alfano was declared anti-constitutional in October 2009. (Note: For the sentence, see "Sentenza n. 262/2009". Consulta Online (in Italian). 7 October 2009.) In the 2019, the Supreme Court of Cassation rejected Schifani's slander damages against Travaglio and Tabucchi, describing their criticism as within the right of critique.

=== President of the Senate ===
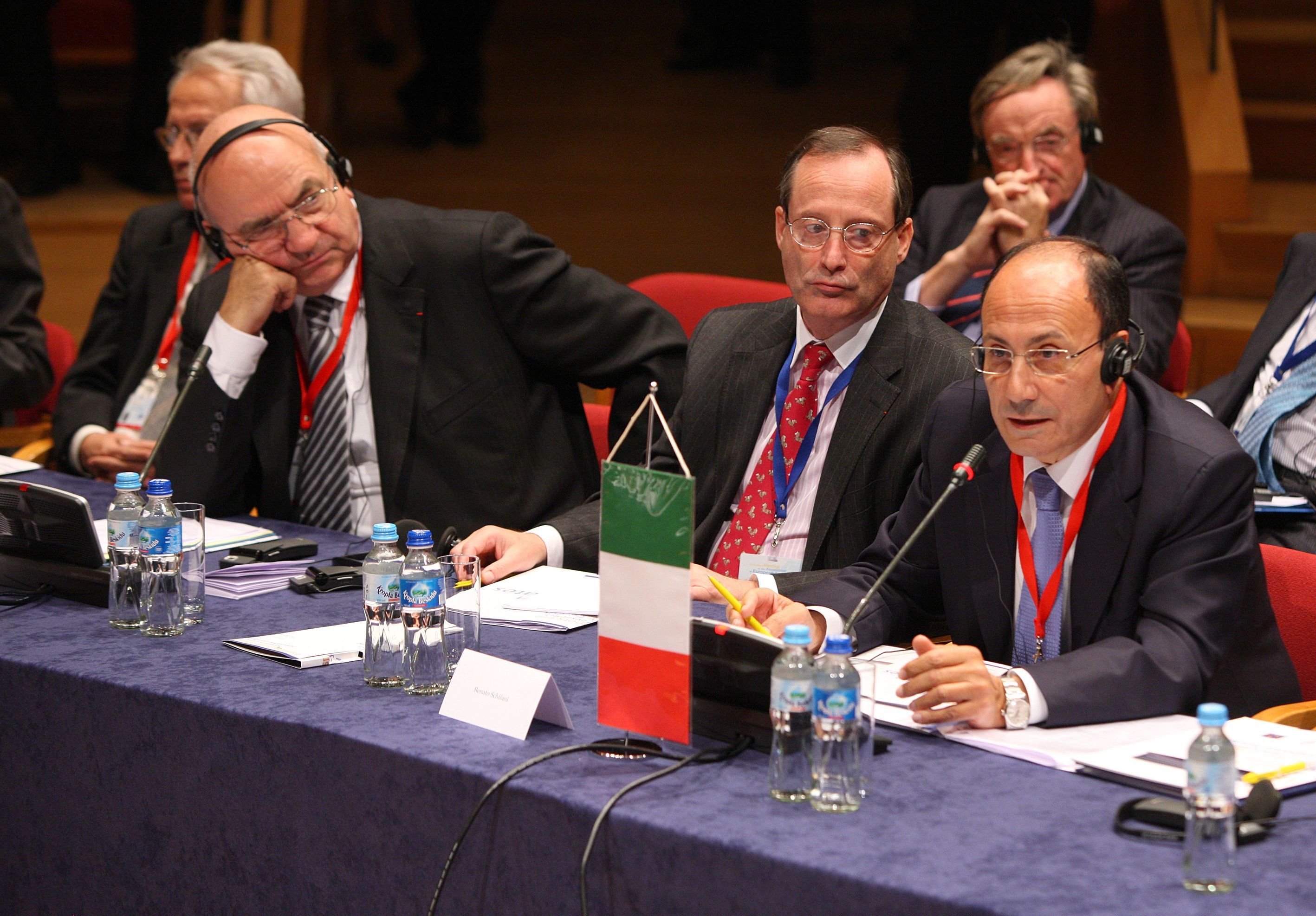
Schifani (right) at the meeting of the Association of European Senates in Gdańsk, 2009

After a snap election brought back Berlusconi to power, Schifani was elected as president of the Senate on 29 April 2008. He received 178 out of 319 votes. Schifani held the position until March 2013.

=== Alleged Mafia connections ===
In 1979, Schifani founded and became managing director of the firm Siculabrokers. Enrico La Loggia (who would later become Minister for Regional Affairs), Benny D'Agostino, Giuseppe Lombardo, and Antonino Mandalà were among its shareholders. D'Agostino is an entrepreneur convicted for Sicilian Mafia association, while Mandalà was convicted for Mafia association and was indicated by the Court of Palermo as the Mafia boss of Villabate. Lombardo was chairman and member of the board of Satris, a credit recovery agency whose shareholders were Ignazio and Nino Salvo, well known businessmen and Mafiosi of the Salemi family who had been arrested by prosecutor Giovanni Falcone in 1984. (Note: For an overview of the Salvo family, see "L'impero dei Salvo". Eco di Ravanusa (in Italian). 2006.)

According to the pentito (Mafia turncoat) Francesco Campanella, Mandalà and La Loggia in the 1990s agreed on the master plan for the shopping centre they wanted to develop in the town of Villabate, which aroused the interests of politicians and the Mafia. Schifani, La Loggia, and the civil engineer Guzzaro (the consultant who advised the town) would share the consulting fees for drawing up the master plan. The master plan of the town of Villabate was designed under specific instruction of Mandalà and his son, who was responsible for the logistics to keep the fugitive Mafia boss Bernardo Provenzano at large. They conspired with the local Mafia families and politicians to skim from the public contracts. In 1992, Schifani, Antonio Mangano, and Antonino Garofalo founded GMS, another credit recovery agency. Schifani's partner Garofalo was charged with usury and extortion in 1997. Schifani was not mentioned in the police investigation.

=== Media row with Marco Travaglio ===
On 10 May 2008, the journalist Marco Travaglio interviewed on the RAI current affairs talk show television programme Che tempo che fa talked about the Italian media and mentioned past relationships between Schifani and men who have subsequently been condemned for Mafia association as an example of a relevant fact that in his view was ignored by almost all Italian newspapers that published a biography of Schifani as the new president of Senate. The statement of Travaglio resulted in fierce and almost universally negative reactions including from the centre-left coalition, except for Mani pulite judge and Italy of Values deputy Antonio Di Pietro, who said that Travaglio was "merely doing his job". Some called for chief executives at RAI to be dismissed. The popular political commentator Beppe Grillo supported Travaglio, while Schifani announced he would take Travaglio to court for slander. Schifani said that Travaglio's accusation was based on "inconsistent or manipulated facts, not even worthy of generating suspicions", adding that "someone wants to undermine the dialogue between the government and the opposition." In 2010, Travaglio was sentenced to pay a €16,000 fine to Schifani, who had instead asked for a fine of almost €2 million. Travaglio said that he was acquitted from the charge of slander and that the fine was merely due to the words he used, such as earthworm or mold, in reference to Schifani.

=== President of Sicily ===
On 25 September 2022, Schifani was elected Sicily's regional president. He then took office after being proclaimed president of Sicily on 13 October 2022. After the death of Berlusconi in June 2023, Antonio Tajani was named the party's secretary. In February 2024, Schifani was appointed as the leader of Forza Italia's national council. He said: "In these two days we are witnessing a second Italian miracle: Forza Italia is still there after Berlusconi left us. ... If there is a party that has truly fought organized crime, fought it openly, it is Forza Italia. We did it through the laws on hard prison and kidnappings, thanks to Silvio Berlusconi who wanted them. Others filled their mouths, held parades and marches, but we put our face to it, not to mention sometimes even our safety."

== Electoral history ==
Election	House	Constituency	Party	Votes	Result
1996	Senate of the Republic	Monreale	FI	50,226	Elected
2001	Senate of the Republic	Monreale	FI	59,731	Elected
2006	Senate of the Republic	Sicily at-large	FI	– (Note: Elected in a closed list proportional representation system.)	Elected
2008	Senate of the Republic	Sicily at-large	PdL	–	Elected
2013	Senate of the Republic	Sicily at-large	PdL	–	Elected
2018	Senate of the Republic	Sicily at-large	FI	–	Elected

=== First-past-the-post elections ===
1996 general election (S): Sicily — Monreale
Candidate	Coalition or party	Votes	%
Renato Schifani	Pole of Freedoms	50,226	49.3
Michele Figurelli	The Olive Tree	40,119	39.3
Salvatore Maltese	Social Movement Tricolour Flame	5,054	5.0
Carlo Magno	Pannella List	2,458	2.4
Others		4,122	4.0
Total		101,979	100.0

2001 general election (S): Sicily — Monreale
Candidate	Coalition or party	Votes	%
Renato Schifani	House of Freedoms	59,731	52.0
Michele Figurelli	The Olive Tree	31,669	27.6
Giuseppe Ferrara	European Democracy	13,795	12.0
Riccardo Incagnone	Communist Refoundation Party	3,286	2.9
Others		6,304	5.5
Total		114,785	100.0

== Personal life ==
Schifani is married to Franca. Together, they have two sons, Roberto and Andrea, both of them being lawyers. On 13 November 2020, Schifani was appointed by Berlusconi as his political advisor. Schifani is a supporter of Palermo FC and inaugurated the club's new sports centre as president of Sicily in 2022. As a tifoso and president of the Senate, he was present at Madrid when Inter Milan won the 2010 UEFA Champions League final. He also presented the Coppa Italia trophy to the winner in 2010 and 2011.

== Notes ==
Political offices
Preceded by Franco Marini	President of the Senate of the Republic; 2008–2013	Succeeded by Pietro Grasso
