= Salvatore "The Senator" Greco =

- Born: 1927; Sicily, Italy
- Died: 1999 (aged 71–72)
- Other name: Il Senatore
- Occupation: Mafioso
- Status: Deceased
- Allegiance: Ciaculli-Croceverde Mafia family / Sicilian Mafia

Salvatore Greco (1927–1999) was a prominent member of the Greco clan of the Sicilian Mafia, and brother of well known Mafia boss Michele Greco nicknamed Il Papa (The Pope) due to his ability to mediate between different Mafia families. Salvatore was nicknamed Il Senatore (The Senator) for his ability to hold political connections.

== Biography ==
Salvatore Greco's nickname was "The Senator" for his political connections. He was the kingmaker of Christian Democrat politicians such as Giovanni Gioia, Vito Ciancimino and Giuseppe Insalaco. Many of those notables were invited by "The Pope" and "The Senator" to wine and dine and take part in hunting parties at his estate La Favarella. The estate was also used as a refuge for mafiosi on the run and to set up a heroin laboratory. The Senator was among those who put pressure on Salvo Lima and other politicians to nullify the Maxi Trial, and eventually informed the rest of the Mafiosi that the state was not going to withdraw the Trial.

Revelations by pentiti and police investigations soon made it clear that Salvatore Greco was one of the key figures in Cosa Nostra's administration, and an arrest warrant against him was issued in 1982, but he managed to remain a fugitive until his capture almost ten years later in 1991. He was arrested when he entered a hospital because he feared he was dying of a heart attack, although this was not the case.

By the time he was captured, he was no longer an important figure within Cosa Nostra as the Greco family had been in decline for several years. He did not become a pentito and eventually died in a prison hospital because of cancer.
