= Pio La Torre =

Italian politician (1927–1982)

Member of the Chamber of Deputies
- In office 25 May 1972 – 30 April 1982
- Constituency: Palermo

Personal details
- Born: 24 December 1927 Palermo, Sicily, Kingdom of Italy
- Died: 30 April 1982 (aged 54) Palermo, Sicily, Italy
- Cause of death: Assassination
- Party: PCI
- Occupation: Politician

Pio La Torre (Italian pronunciation: [ˈpiːo la ˈtorre]; 24 December 1927 – 30 April 1982) was a leader of the Italian Communist Party (PCI). He was killed by the Mafia after he initiated a law that introduced a new crime in the Italian legal system, mafia conspiracy, and extended the power of the courts to seize and confiscate assets of people belonging to a Mafia-type association.

== Peasant leader ==
La Torre was born in Altarello di Baida, a neighbourhood on the outskirts of Palermo. He grew up with five siblings in a poor peasant family, with no water or electricity at home. His political commitment began with his enrolment in the Italian Communist Party (PCI) in 1945 and the establishment of a party section in his township, the first of many that he also helped to open in neighbouring townships. His political activities started as a leader of the peasant movement on Sicily, first in the Confederterra, later on as the regional secretary of the Italian General Confederation of Labour (Cgil).

In 1948, he had to leave his family home, ever since his father, worried by the threats of the Mafia, who had come to threaten him by burning down the stable doors, had invited Pio La Torre to choose between continuing his battle by leaving or staying with his family. At the time, on the eve of the 1948 Italian general election, several peasant leaders had been killed, including Placido Rizzotto in Corleone (who was killed by the Mafia of Luciano Leggio), Calogero Cangelosi in Camporeale and Epifanio Li Puma in Petralia.

In March 1950, La Torre was arrested in Bisacquino while leading the fight of peasants for land reform through occupations of large estates. He spent 18 months in jail in preventive custody before being released. While in jail, his wife Giuseppina Zacco, a daughter of a Palermo doctor who he had married in 1949, gave birth to his first-born son.

In 1960 he became a member of the Central Committee of the PCI, and in 1962 he was elected as the regional secretary of the party for Sicily. In 1961, he graduated in political science at the University of Palermo.

== In Parliament ==
La Torre was elected in the Italian Chamber of Deputies for the district of Palermo in May 1972. He was re-elected twice and remained a deputy until he was killed by the Mafia on 30 April 1982. La Torre became a member of the Antimafia Commission, formed in 1962 during the First Mafia War, which published its final report in 1976. La Torre, together with judge Cesare Terranova, wrote a minority report, which pointed to links between the Mafia and prominent politicians in particular of the Christian Democrat party (DC). According to the minority report:

… it would be a grave error on the part of the Commission to accept the theory that the Mafia-political link has been eliminated. Even today the behaviour of the ruling DC group in the running of the City and the Provincial Councils offers the most favourable terrain for the perpetuation of the system of Mafia power.

La Torre also proposed far-reaching legislation to fight the Mafia, but these did not advance at the time since they came at a politically inopportune moment.

After a series of Mafia killings in 1979–80, which included state officials that actively opposed Cosa Nostra such as police inspector Boris Giuliano, judge Terranova, and DC politician Piersanti Mattarella, La Torre initiated a bill on 31 March 1980 that introduced a new crime in the Italian legal system, mafia conspiracy, and extended the power for the courts to seize and confiscate assets of persons involved in the mafia conspiracy.

With the inclusion of a Mafia-type association in Article 416 bis of the Italian Penal Code, a serious legal gap in fighting mafia-type organized crime was filled. Despite the clear and known danger, mafia conspiracy had not been recognised as a criminal phenomenon in the Penal Code. As a result, many judges did not consider the Mafia as a criminal association. Until then, the provisions of Article 416 of the Penal Code on mafia-like associations were suitable only for local and limited phenomena of associated crime and delinquency, but not for organised crime of mafia proportions.

== Return to Sicily ==
In 1981, La Torre requested of the party that he be sent back to Sicily where he became the regional secretary of the PCI. He also became part of the popular movement against the deployment of Ground Launched Cruise Missiles (GLCM) by the United States at Comiso Air Base, just like the journalist Giuseppe Fava. The missiles were stationed in June 1983 but were dismantled after the Intermediate-Range Nuclear Forces Treaty (INF) was signed by the former Soviet Union and the United States on 8 December 1987. The last 16 GLCMs left the Comiso Air Base in 1991.

== Assassination by the Mafia ==
The bodies of Pio La Torre and Rosario Di Salvo after their assassination by the Mafia

Before his new anti-Mafia law was approved in Parliament, La Torre was killed by the Corleonesi, which were engaged in a fierce internal war against rival Mafia factions (the so-called Second Mafia War) and against those representatives of the state that tried to seriously fight Cosa Nostra.

On 30 April 1982, La Torre and his driver Rosario Di Salvo were shot in a hail of bullets near the Communist Party's headquarters in Palermo. Their car was trapped in a one-way street blocked by the killers' car. Di Salvo shot back with his .38-caliber pistol before he was killed. The hit team was composed of Pino Greco, Giuseppe Lucchese, Nino Madonia, Mario Prestifilippo and Salvatore Cucuzza.

The day after General Carlo Alberto Dalla Chiesa was appointed as prefect for Palermo to stop the violence of the Second Mafia War. La Torre's law was approved only after Dalla Chiesa was also murdered on 3 September 1982, on the orders of Mafia boss Salvatore Riina of the Corleonesi. That compelled Parliament to adopt the law La Torre initiated in a rush together with other emergency measures against the Mafia.

=== Murder investigation and convictions ===
La Torre was "sentenced" to death by the Sicilian Mafia Commission because of his political endeavour against the Mafia. On 12 April 1995, Michele Greco, Totò Riina, Bernardo Brusca, Bernardo Provenzano, Pippo Calò, Francesco Madonia and Nenè Geraci, all members of the Commission, were sentenced to life imprisonment for ordering the murder. The remaining material killers, Antonino Madonia and Giuseppe Lucchese (the others had been killed in the Second Mafia War), were sentenced to life in 2004.

== Antimafia law ==
The Rognoni-La Torre Law, also known as the "Antimafia law", unified two proposals; one by the Christian Democrat minister Virginio Rognoni and the one drafted by La Torre, and included two essential innovations:

(a) The introduction of mafia conspiracy as a new crime in the legal system;
(b) Extended the power for the courts to seize and to confiscate assets of persons involved in the mafia conspiracy, as well as of those who in the past five years acted as a "front man" or being involved in a cover-up role for a mafia-type organisation.

The Rognoni-La Torre Law granted the judiciary better access to bank records in order to follow money trails, allowed the state to seize and confiscate the assets of convicted mafiosi, and defined membership of the Mafia as a crime independent of other criminal acts. Instead of just participating in Mafia activities, being associated with the Mafia in any way was made a criminal offense.

Article 416 of the Italian Penal Code, which had its origins in Mussolini’s fascist rule (1930), defined plain organized crime based on three elements: (1) an associative bond, (2) an organized structure, and (3) a criminal design. Mafia-type organized crime was now defined as having additional specific properties: an associative bond with a level of intimidating capacity to cause subjection and omertà. The level of organisation is such that it can be considered a system; the imposition of an absolute rule of obedience through a law of silence that demands, from the entire population, a submission to the power of the mafia resulting in a refusal to collaborate with law enforcement institutions.

According to the newly introduced article 416 bis:

"The organization is of the mafia-type when its components use intimidation, subjection and, consequentially, silence (omertà), to commit crimes, directly or indirectly acquire the management or the control of businesses, concessions, authorizations, public contracts and public services to obtain either unjust profits or advantages for themselves or others."

The Rognoni-La Torre Law was instrumental in the fight against the Mafia, and provided the tools used by Antimafia judge Rocco Chinnici, and the Antimafia Pool headed by Giovanni Falcone and Paolo Borsellino, to prosecute the Sicilian Mafia in the Maxi Trial that started in 1986 and led to the conviction in December 1987 of the 475 defendants, including the Mafia's top echelon of the Commission. Like La Torre, the judges did not survive the revenge of the Mafia.

== Legacy ==
Journalist Alexander Stille summarized La Torre’s significant but tragic legacy as the person that "achieved only in death what he had fought for in life: for the first time in history, the parliament made it a crime to belong to the Mafia and gave prosecutors the power to seize Mafia assets accumulated through criminal activity." The Comiso Airport was dedicated to Pio La Torre.

== See also ==
- List of victims of the Sicilian Mafia

== Sources ==
- Jamieson, Alison (2000). The Antimafia: Italy’s fight against organized crime, London: Macmillan, ISBN 0-333-80158-X
- Schneider, Jane C. & Peter T. Schneider (2003). Reversible Destiny: Mafia, Antimafia, and the Struggle for Palermo, Berkeley and Los Angeles, CA: University of California Press ISBN 0-520-22100-1
- Seindal, René (1998). Mafia: Money and Politics in Sicily, 1950-1997, Copenhagen: Museum Tusculanum Press ISBN 87-7289-455-5
- Stille, Alexander (1996). Excellent Cadavers: The Mafia and the Death of the First Italian Republic, New York: Vintage Books ISBN 0-679-76863-7
