= Vincenzo Puccio =

Member of the Sicilian Mafia

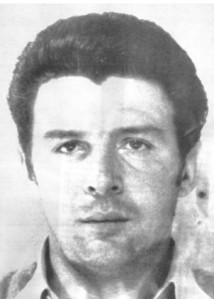
- Born: 27 November 1945; Palermo, Sicily, Italy
- Died: 11 May 1989 (aged 43); Palermo, Sicily, Italy
- Cause of death: Bludgeoned
- Occupations: Mafioso hitman
- Status: Deceased
- Allegiance: Corleonesi
- Criminal charges: Murder
- Penalty: Life imprisonment

Vincenzo Puccio (27 November 1945 – 11 May 1989) was a member of the Sicilian Mafia. He was from Palermo and joined the Ciaculli Mafia family sometime in the late 1970s, although, like many other members of that particular family, he operated a great deal under the orders of the Corleonesi.

== Criminal career ==
He was arrested together with two other men, Giuseppe Madonia and Armando Bonanno, on 4 May 1980, for the murder of Carabinieri captain Emanuele Basile, who had been shot earlier that day. Puccio and his accomplices were tried twice; the first trial was annulled, and they were acquitted at the second. As part of Sicilian law, the judge, despite the acquittal, ordered the three men to be sent into a form of exile to Sardinia, but they swiftly made their way back to Sicily.

Puccio was involved as well in the killing of Carabinieri Colonel Giuseppe Russo, on 20 August 1977, Antimafia judge Cesare Terranova and Piersanti Mattarella – the president of the autonomous Sicilian Region – on 6 January 1980.

In 1985, Puccio and Giuseppe Lucchese murdered their boss, Pino Greco, on the orders of Salvatore Riina. As a reward, Puccio was granted the prestigious position of chief of the Mafia family and the mandamento of Ciaculli.

Late in 1986, Puccio was captured and held on suspicion of multiple murders. On 11 May 1989, he was beaten to death in his cell at the Ucciardone Prison in Palermo, by fellow inmates Antonino and Giuseppe Marchese, two other Mafiosi who had been acting on Riina's orders. In 1990 an informant, Francesco Marino Mannoia, subsequently claimed that Puccio had become the boss of the Ciaculli Family after the murder of his predecessor, Giuseppe Greco, in 1987. Puccio had been planning on taking on the Corleonesi, and overthrowing Riina and Bernardo Provenzano, the most powerful mafiosi in the Sicilian Mafia. Riina had found out about this conspiracy after Corleonesi mafioso Leoluca Bagarella had been let in on the plan but, for whatever reason, had treacherously revealed all to his boss.

Antonino and Giuseppe Marchese - both nephews of another Mafia boss, Filippo Marchese - claimed they had killed Vincenzo Puccio in self-defence after a fight, but their claim was ruined by Riina who deliberately had Vincenzo Puccio's brother, Pietro, killed that same day outside of prison. This meant the Marchese brothers had no chance of convincing a jury that they had acted in self-defence during a spontaneous fight when their victim's brother had been deliberately shot dead that same day. They were both sentenced to life imprisonment for Puccio's murder. Puccio's successor as head of the Ciaculli Mafia Family was Giuseppe Lucchese.

Giuseppe Marchese subsequently cooperated with the government and became a pentito. He confirmed the details Francesco Marino Mannoia had given previously of the events leading to Puccio's killing on Riina's orders.

One of Vincenzo Puccio's other brothers, Antonino Puccio, was killed on 5 July 1989, presumably to prevent him from seeking revenge for the deaths of Vincenzo and Pietro. In October 1993, nine months after his capture, Riina was sentenced to life imprisonment for ordering the murders of Vincenzo and Pietro Puccio.
