= Frank Coppola (mobster) =

Italian-American mobster and crime boss

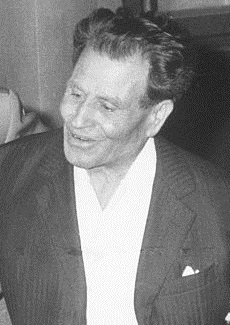
Frank Coppola.

Frank Coppola (born Francesco Paolo Coppola; 1899 in Partinico – 26 April 1982 in Aprilia), known as "Frank Three Fingers", was an Italian-American mobster and crime boss.

== Background ==
Frank Coppola was born in Partinico, Sicily, Italy in 1899. In 1926 he emigrated clandestinely to the United States and settled in Detroit. He worked as a laborer and then as a seller of fruit and vegetables, before entering the mob. He was known as Frank Three Fingers because he lacked two, the left ring finger and little finger after his fingers had slipped inside the door of a safe during a robbery and had to be cut off with a knife before the police arrived.

He later claimed, in an interview with the Italian Antimafia Commission in 1971:

My shotgun exploded. To someone who goes around robbing banks, it can happen that he loses his fingers.

=== Drug trafficking ===
He was a major drug trafficker with strong ties to the Detroit Partnership with Angelo Meli and the St. Louis crime family particularly Anthony "Tony" Giordano. He was also a close associate of Jimmy Hoffa. His activities soon led him to be on the FBI list of most wanted criminals. He transported narcotics to Joseph Civello in Dallas and Frank Livorsi in New York.

== Expelled to Italy ==
In 1948 he was expelled from the United States and sent back to Italy. He settled in Ardea, near Rome, where he invested all the money accumulated, in real estate. In Italy, he allegedly dealt with clean business, however according to the judicial authorities, he was at the center of large drug trafficking operations. In the last period of life because of poor health, Coppola was hospitalized for over a year in an Aprilia clinic. He died on April 26, 1982 at the age of 83.
