= Colle Del Marchese =

- Frazione
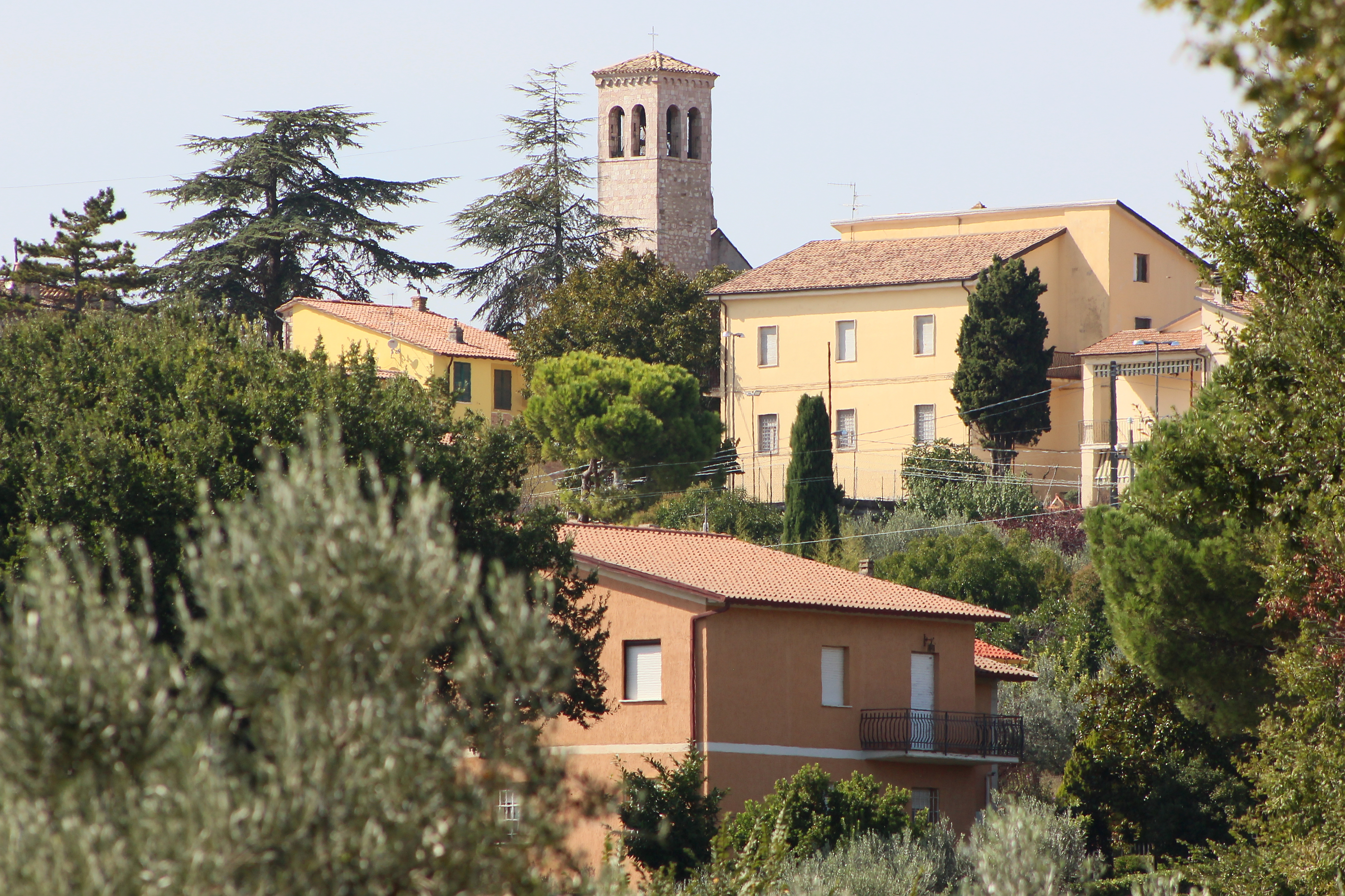
- Colle Del Marchese

- Location within Italy
- Coordinates: 42°49′40″N 12°37′42″E
- Country: Italy
- Region: Umbria
- Province: Perugia
- Comune: Castel Ritaldi
- Elevation: 466 m (1,529 ft)

Population (2001)
  - Total: 121
- Time zone: UTC+1 (CET)
  - Summer (DST): UTC+2 (CEST)
- Postcode: 06044
- Area code: 0743

Colle Del Marchese is a frazione of the comune of Castel Ritaldi in the Province of Perugia, Umbria, central Italy. It stands at an elevation of 466 metres above sea level. At the time of the Istat census of 2001 it had 121 inhabitants.

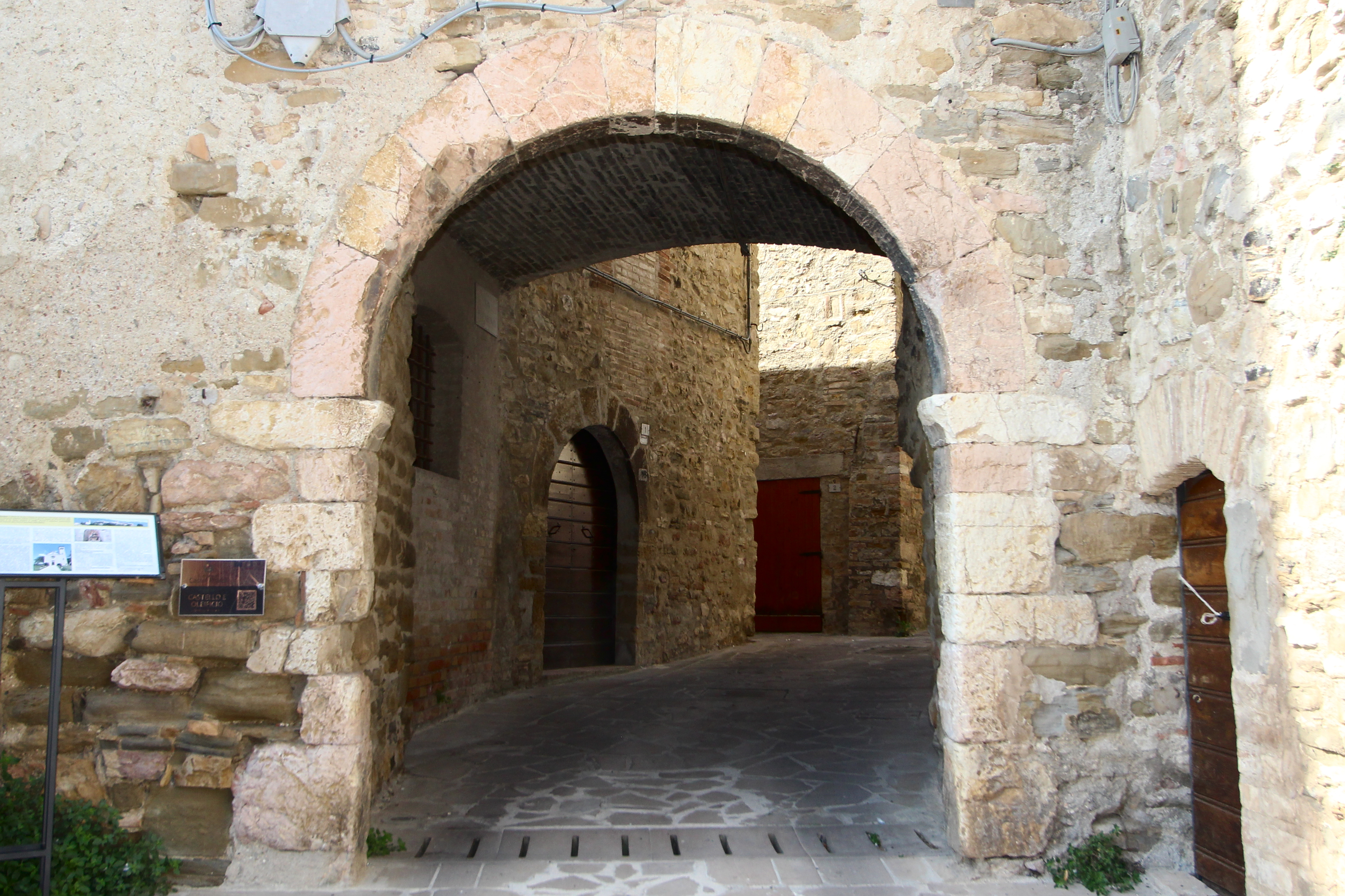
Defensive gate Porta del Castello

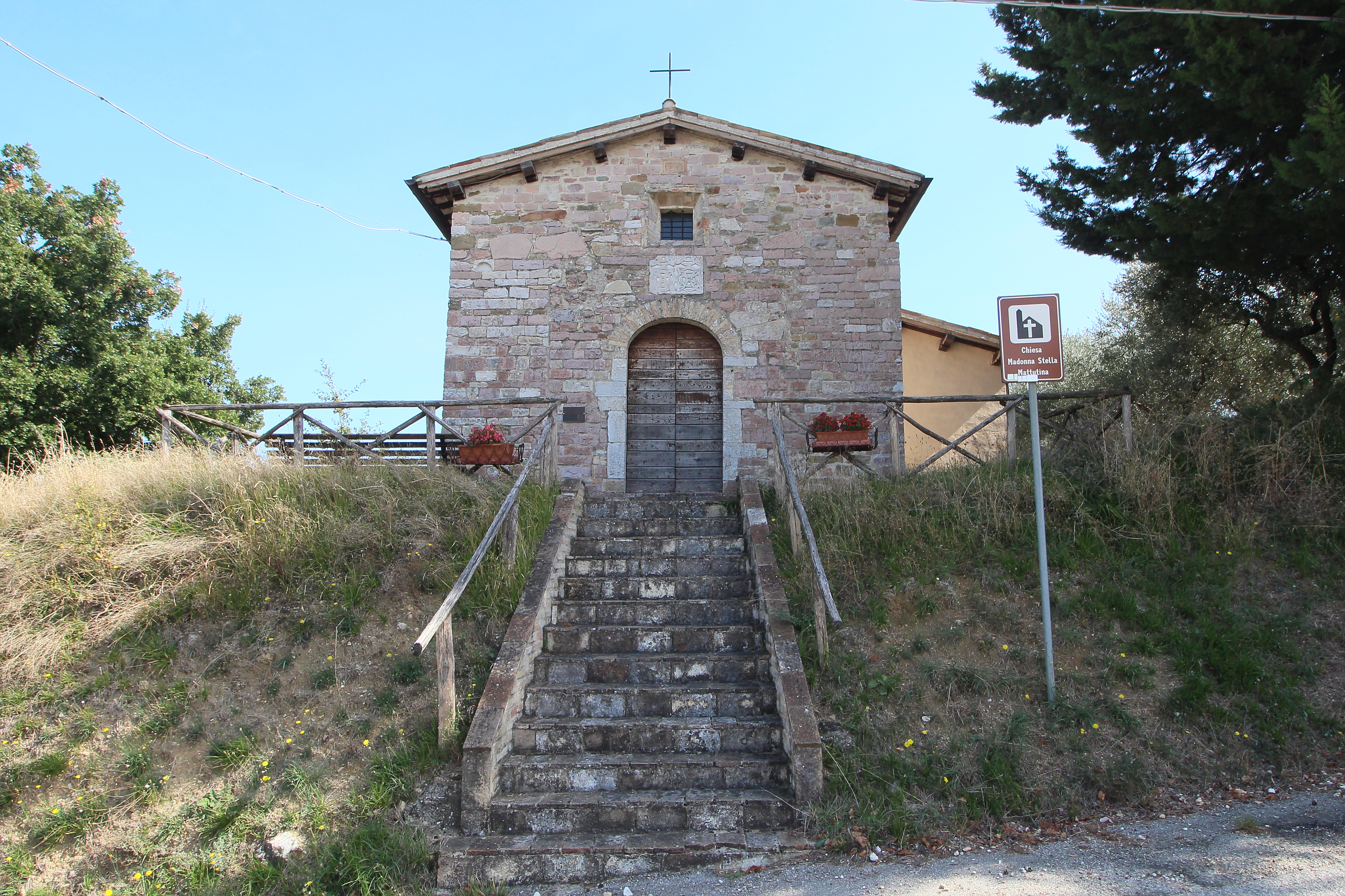
The church Madonna della Stella

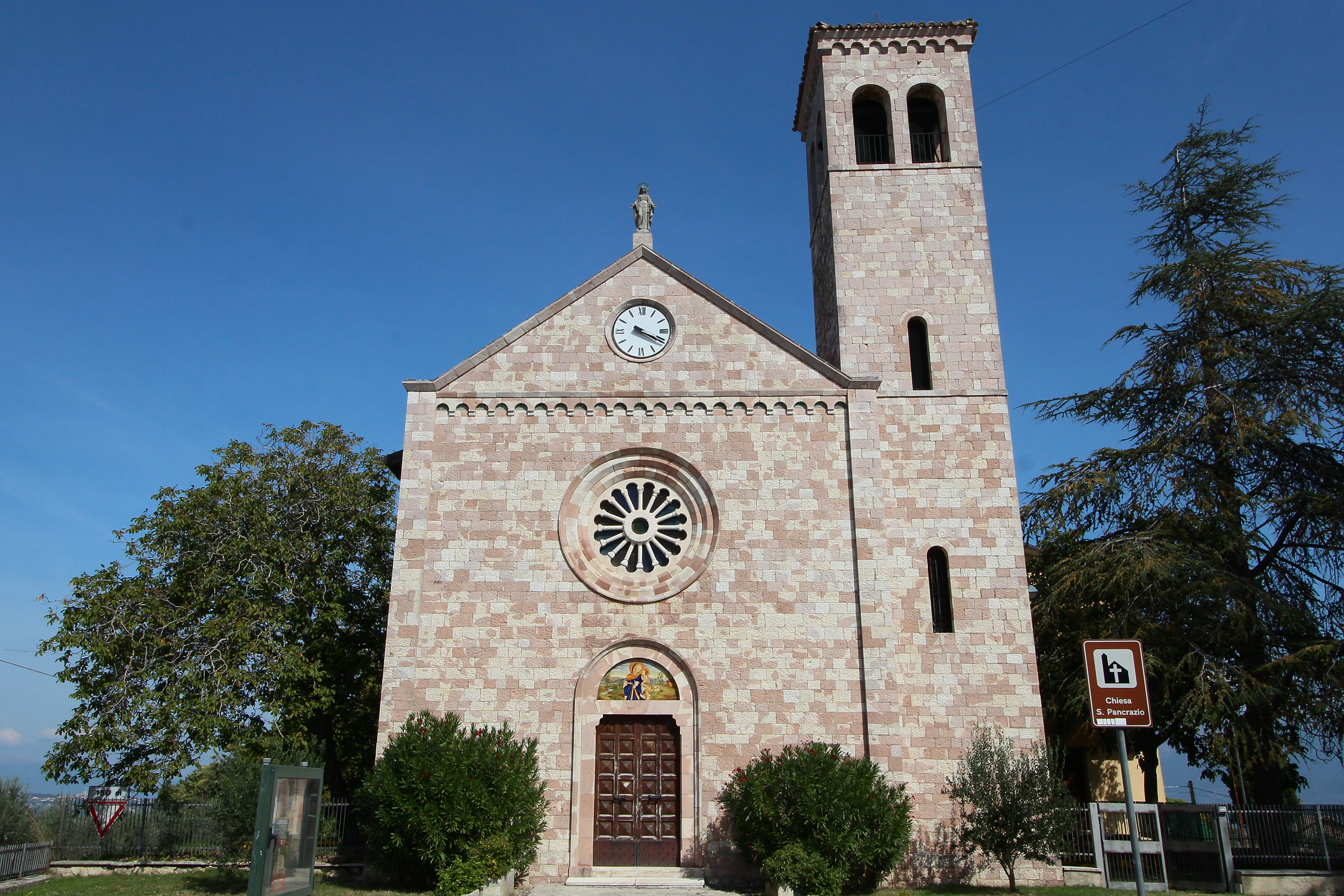
The church San Pancrazio nuovo

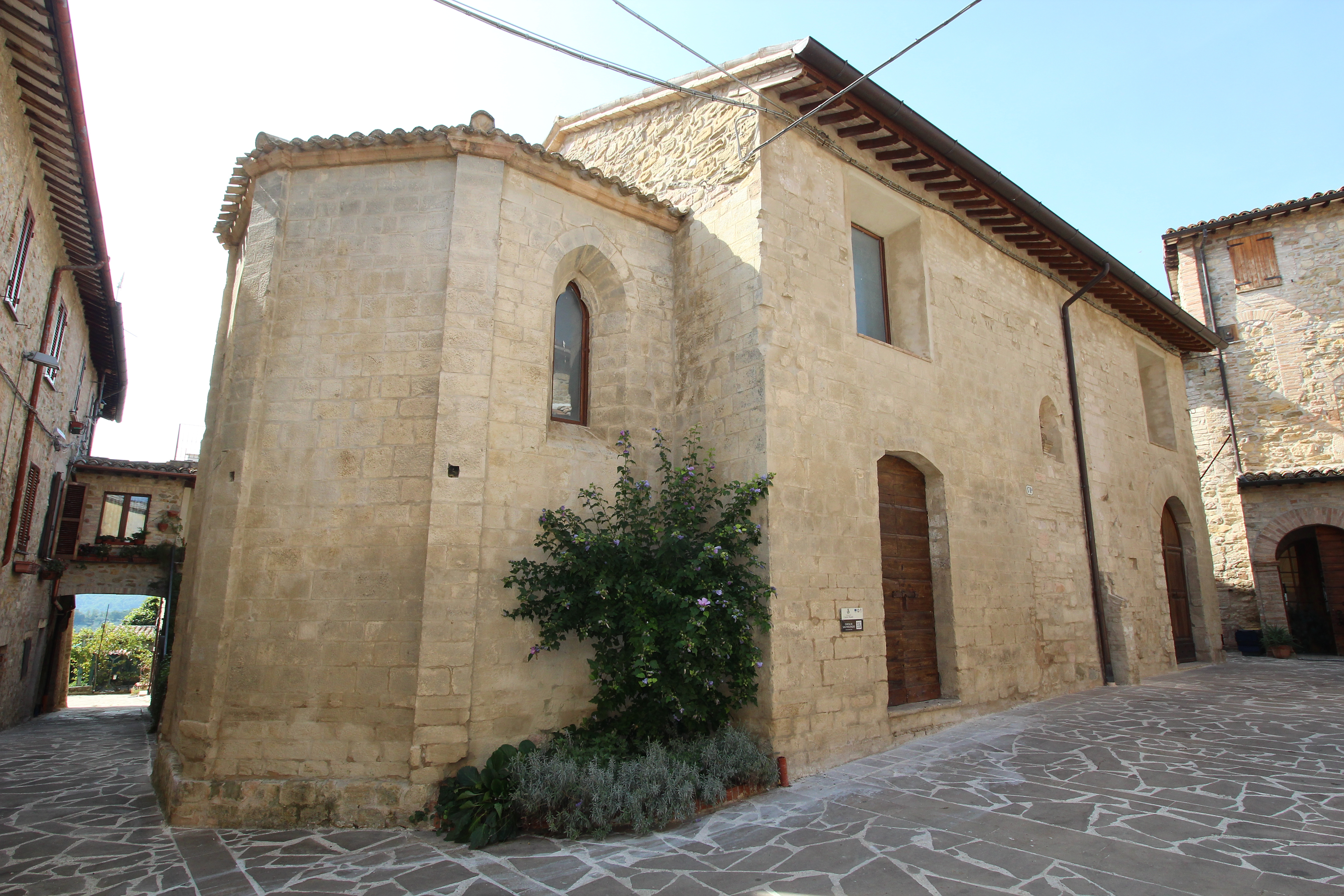
The church San Pancrazio vecchio

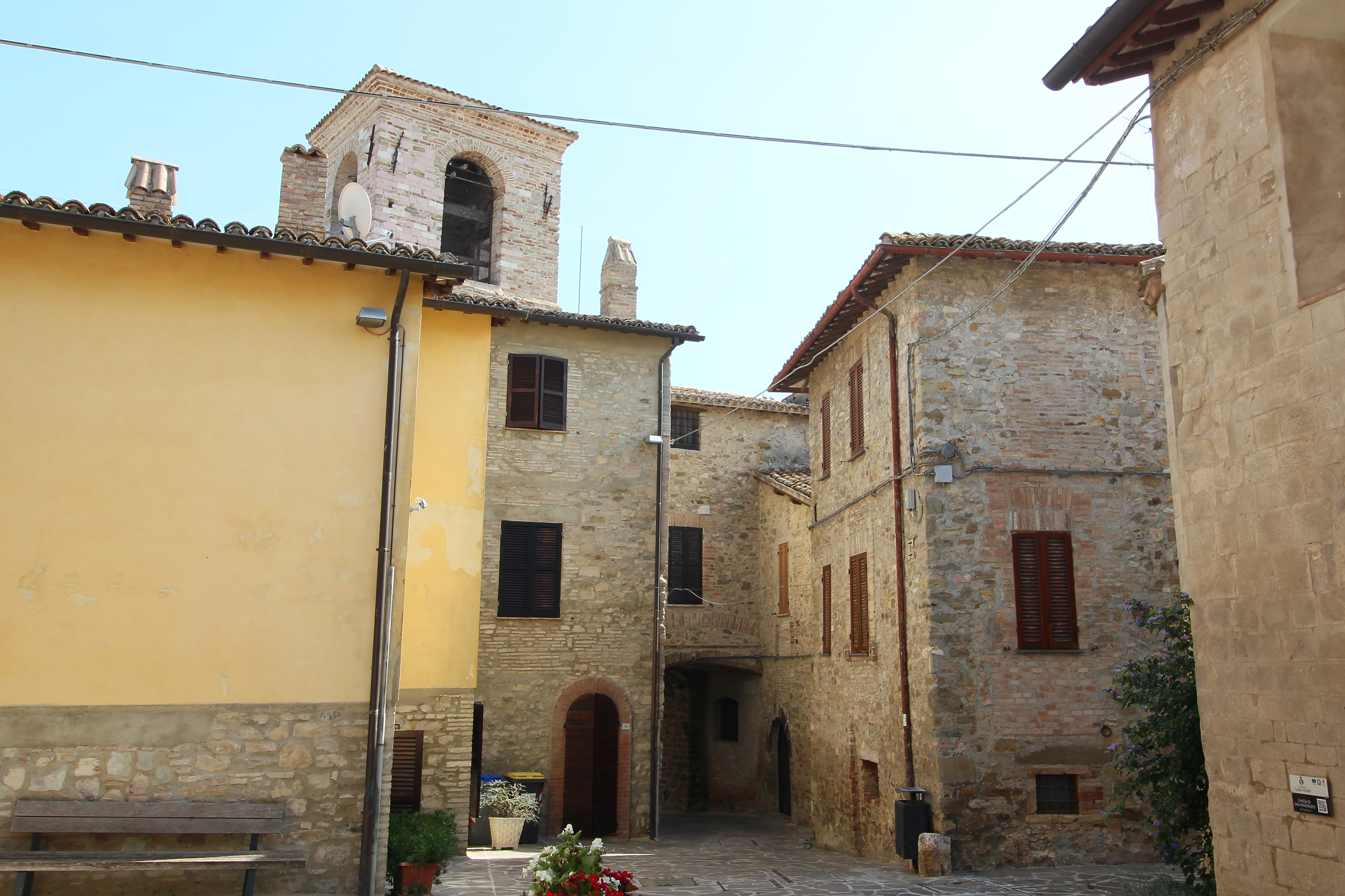
The historical center
