= Second Mafia War =

Conflict involving the Sicilian Mafia from 1981-1983

- Part of Sicilian Mafia wars
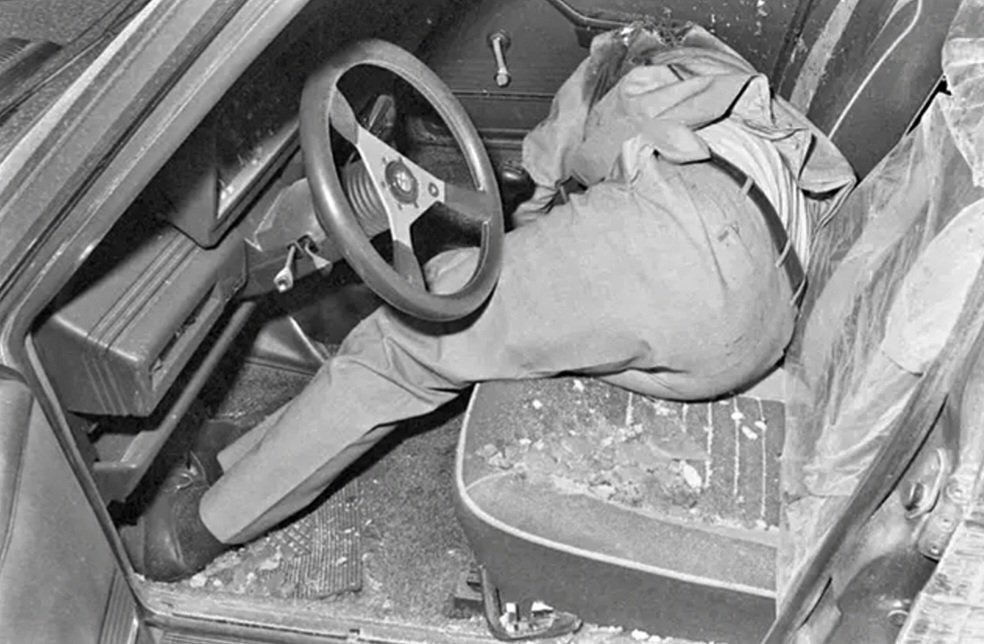
- Body of Mafia boss Stefano Bontade taken in 1981.
Date	1981–1983
Location	Sicily, Italy (with spillover to New Jersey, United States)
Result	Corleonesi dominate the Sicilian Mafia

Belligerents
Corleonesi Mafia clan: Corleone Mafia family Greco Mafia family	Inzerillo family Bontate family Badalamenti family	Government of Italy

Commanders and leaders
Salvatore Riina; Bernardo Provenzano; Leoluca Bagarella	Stefano Bontate (executed); Salvatore Inzerillo (executed); Salvatore Scaglione (executed)	(Italy) Carlo Alberto Dalla Chiesa (executed) (Italy) Rocco Chinnici (executed)

Casualties and losses
- 1000 dead

The Second Mafia War, also known as the Great Mafia War or the Mattanza (Italian for 'Slaughter'), was a period of conflict involving the Sicilian Mafia from 1981 to 1983. The war pitted the Corleonesi faction and their allies, against other powerful mafia families, for control over much of the organized crime in Sicily.

The significant casualties from the feud led to the involvement of the Italian government, causing further bloodshed where magistrates, police, politicians, and activists were assassinated. In turn, the war resulted in a major crackdown against the mafia, helped by the pentiti — mafiosi who collaborated with the authorities after losing so many friends and relatives to the fighting. In effect, the conflict helped end the secrecy of the Sicilian Mafia.

== Preceding events ==
The instigators of the conflict were the Corleonesi, a mafia family from the town of Corleone. A series of gang warfare marked much of the history of the group, with Luciano Leggio emerging as its top leader after the murder of Corleone boss Michele Navarra. The more rural Corleonesi initially made their income through brutal means such as kidnapping, compared to their urbanized peers who favored less violent but more lucrative trade such as heroin smuggling. The Corleonesi were often referred to as "the peasants" – i viddani in Sicilian – by other mafia families, especially by the powerful bosses in the capital of Palermo.

Things began to change in the 1960s as the Corleonesi grew in power and prestige under the leadership of the ambitious Leggio. By 1969, an attempt to re-establish the Sicilian Mafia Commission occurred, though it only became fully operative in 1974. Stefano Bontade and Gaetano Badalamenti made up two of the three leaders of the Commission. The third was Leggio, although he was represented by Salvatore Riina as Leggio was in hiding on the Italian mainland. While other Palermo crime families, such as those led by Salvatore Inzerillo, were preoccupied with growing their illicit businesses and expanding their political influence, the Corleonesi focused on strengthening themselves militarily. They also began to win over allies amongst other mafia families, such as Palermo bosses Giuseppe Calò (boss of Porta Nuova), Filippo Marchese (boss of Corso Dei Mille) and Rosario Riccobono (boss of Partanna Mondello).

In 1978, Riina managed to have Badalamenti expelled from the Commission, accused of having organised the assassination of Francesco Madonia (boss of Vallelunga and ally of the Corleonesi), and subsequently exiled from the mafia and Sicily altogether. His place was taken by Ciaculli Godfather Michele "The Pope" Greco, who was also aligned with Riina. In the same year, the Corleonesi murdered Giuseppe Di Cristina and Giuseppe Calderone, bosses of Riesi and Catania respectively. Both men were allies of Bontade and Inzerillo; their successors were allies of Riina, who sponsored them. Gradually, the remaining Corleonesi rivals were isolated.

== The Slaughter ==
On the evening of April 23, 1981, Stefano Bontade was murdered outside Palermo while returning home in his Alfa Romeo Giulietta. He was killed by Giuseppe Greco, a Corleonesi killer, who shot him to death with an AK-47 from the seat of a Honda CB motorbike, driven by Giuseppe Lucchese. After a few weeks, on May 11, Salvatore Inzerillo was killed outside his lover's house by three hitmen armed with assault rifles and a shotgun. Various relatives and associates of the pair were subsequently killed or vanished without trace, including Inzerillo's teenage son, who was brutally tortured and killed for vowing to avenge his murdered father. Calogero Pizzuto, one of Bontade and Inzerillo's closest and most loyal ally, was shot dead in a crowded bar alongside two innocent bystanders.

The fact that many bosses aligned themselves with the Corleonesi, without telling other mafiosi, also aided the campaign. One gruesome example that involved such deception happened in late May 1981, whereby six members of Bontade and Inzerillo's mafia families were invited to a meeting with one of their supposed friends. This 'friend' was Rosario Riccobono, one of Bontade's oldest allies. Unbeknownst to the guests, Riccobono had already joined the Corleonesi. Six of the guests vanished, including Emanuele D'Agostino and his son. The only one of the six men to survive was Salvatore Contorno, who subsequently survived another murder attempt and went into hiding before he was caught by the police in March 1982. During that time, 35 of his relatives were murdered by the Corleonesi. A similar instance of betrayal occurred in 1892, when Michele Greco organized a barbecue with several leading mafiosi. The event ended with the total annihilation of the Partanna Mondello Crime Family.

The suddenness of the slaughter disoriented the other mafia families and prevented any formal resistance. More and more killings took place over the next two years. The Bontante-Inzerello faction lost 200 members in mere months. In addition there were at least 160 cases of mafiosi and their associates who vanished; victims of what was known as lupara bianca (Sicilian for "White Shotgun"), whereby the body was completely destroyed or buried so that it was never found. From 1981 to 1984 there were at least 400 mafia killings in Palermo and as more across Sicily. One of the most powerful and influential member of the Sicilian Mafia, Tommaso Buscetta, was also targetted by the Corleonesi. On September 11, 1982, Buscetta's two sons from his first wife, Benedetto and Antonio, disappeared, never to be found again. This was followed by the deaths of his brother Vincenzo, son-in-law Giuseppe Genova, brother-in-law Pietro and four of his nephews, Domenico and Benedetto Buscetta, and Orazio and Antonio D 'Amico. These events would soon force Buscetta to become a pentito or informant in later years.

=== American theatre ===
The American Mafia soon received news of the ongoing feud in Sicily. Both Sicilian and American organizations had had history of working together, including in the lucrative Pizza Connection smuggling that was pioneered by Buscetta. John Gambino of the Gambino Crime Family traveled to Sicily to personally see what was going on. Him and the Corleonesi met and the two groups made a deal. Upon returning, Gambino relayed an instruction that any mafia refugees from the losing faction must be intercepted and killed, including Buscetta. Pietro Inzerello, brother of Salvatore, was murdered in January 1982 in Mount Laurel, New Jersey. His body was placed inside the trunk of a car, with 5 dollar bills stuffed inside his mouth and genitals. However, the Gambino mob did manage to negotiate for the safety of a select few Inzerillos, with the agreement that they or their offspring would never step foot in Sicily again. They were dubbed "gli scappati" (the escapees).

=== Corleonesi infighting ===
The killings were not isolated to the Corleonesi rivals. The group had also begun suspecting their allies and even fellow members. In late 1982, Riccobono and twenty of his associates and friends were killed. Soon, Marchese was murdered through strangulation, and his body was dissolved in acid. This pattern of amicide would continue well to the next decade since the war's end, as many Corleonesi members began either becoming independent or turning state's evidence; most notably top Corleonesi hitman Giuseppe Greco, who was killed by his own comrades.

== War against the Italian state ==
The ongoing large-scale gang war in Sicily caught the attention of the Italian government, and some efforts to stop it was initiated. In turn, the Corleonesi opened up a second front against the new enemy, bringing in another wave of violence. Utilizing a similar strategy used against other mafiosi, the Corleonesi began eliminating selected individuals of the anti-mafia minority. Their victims became known as "excellent cadavers".

The murder of government figures were not new to the Corleonesi, as they had in the past, murdered several prominent men, such as Cesare Terranova, Emanuele Basile, Boris Giuliano, and Piersanti Mattarella. During the Second Mafia War, two of the most infamous assassinations of public servants were the deaths of politician Pio La Torre in 1982 and magistrate Rocco Chinnici in 1983. The Corleonesi used small-arms ambush and a car bomb to kill the two respectively. Chinnici was a mentor to judge Giovanni Falcone, who himself would lead a national fight against the mafia.

Law enforcement was also a frequent target of the Corleonesi. One of their most brazen operations was the Circonvallazione massacre that occurred on June 16, 1982, where during an attempt to ambush Catanese boss Alfio Ferlito, three carabinieri escorts were killed with automatic rifles. The highest-ranking officer the Corleonesi managed to kill, however, was General Carlo Alberto dalla Chiesa; he was killed together with his wife and escort in September 3, 1982, by motorcycle-riding gunmen led by Giuseppe Greco. In June 13, 1983, carabinieri captain Mario D'Aleo, and officers Giuseppe Bommarito and Pietro Morici were murdered.

These well-planned attacks only fueled the drive to eradicate the mafia. A law pioneered by Torre was passed, bearing similarities to America's RICO Act that was used against the American Mafia; as well as having the ability to confiscate any ill-gotten wealth owned by mafia-like organizations. One anonymous policeman was quoted by newspaper L'Ora as saying, "We are at war." Still, it would take years of investigation and collaboration between the anti-mafia pool, and various law enforcement agencies, before the state could effectively fight back through the Maxi Trial of 1986.

== End ==
The primary result of the Second Mafia War was the victory of the Corleonesi and its bosses, Salvatore Riina and Bernardo Provenzano. By the mid-1980s they were effectively in charge of much of the Sicilian Mafia and by the end of the decade, after many of their allies were eliminated or in prison, they effectively had a hegemony over the criminal organization. This was summed up by Salvatore Contorno who, when asked at the trial about the "winners" and "losers" of the Second Mafia War, declared: "The winning and losing clans don't exist, because the losers don't exist. The Corleonesi killed them all." That being said, a major consequence of the brutality was defection of many mafiosi to the government, most notably Contorno and Buscetta, resulting in droves of informants that soon affected the Corleonesi.

Opposition to the mafia was staunchly led by Antonino Caponnetto, Giovanni Falcone, and Paolo Borsellino. Law enforcement was also strengthened following protests from the police and their families caused by casualties in the previous war. Through the Maxi Trial, hundreds of mafiosi were convicted of a long litany of crimes. Many of the defendants, such as Riina and Provenzano, were life convicted in absentia as they were still fugitives at the time of the trial. The Corleonesi renewed their offensive in the late 80s and early 90s. High ranking policeman were killed, such as Ninni Cassarà in 1985 and Giovanni Lizzio in 1992. The Capaci bombing soon took the life of Falcone, and the Via D'Amelio bombing two months later murdered Borsellino.

Continuing crackdown by the Italian Government eventually led to the diminishment of Corleonesi's power, including the capture and arrest of many key figures. Riina was finally captured by the carabinieri at Palermo on January 15, 1993, finally bringing an end to the violence in the region. Other leaders, who were not as violent as Riina, subsequently fell, beginning with Bagarella on June 24, 1995. Giovanni Brusca, one of Riina's hitmen who personally detonated the bomb that killed Falcone, became a state witness after his arrest in 1996. The last head of the clan during the war, Provenzano, was finally captured on April 11, 2006 at Corleone.

== See also ==
- First Mafia War

== Bibliography ==
- Allum, Felia; Clough Marinaro, Isabella; Sciarrone, Rocco, eds. (2019). Italian Mafias Today: Territory, Business and Politics. Cheltenham Northampton: Edward Elgar Publishing. ISBN 978-1789904130.
- Dickie, John (2004). Cosa Nostra. A history of the Sicilian Mafia. London: Hodder & Stoughton. ISBN 0-340-82435-2.
- Follain, John (2009). The Last Godfathers: Inside the Mafia's Most Infamous Family. New York: St. Martin's Publishing Group. ISBN 978-1429935418.
- Jamieson, Alison (2000). The Antimafia: Italy's Fight Against Organized Crime. Basingstoke: Macmillan [u.a.] ISBN 0-333-80158-X.
- Schneider, Jane; Schneider, Peter T. (2003). Reversible Destiny: Mafia, Antimafia, and the Struggle for Palermo. Berkeley: University of California Press. ISBN 0-520-23609-2.
- Sterling, Claire (1990). Octopus. How the Long Reach of the Sicilian Mafia Controls the Global Narcotics Trade. New York: Simon & Schuster. ISBN 0-671-73402-4.
- Shawcross, Tim; Young, Martin (1987). Men of Honour: The Confessions of Tommaso Buscetta (1. publ ed.). London: Collins. ISBN 0-00-217589-4.
- Stille, Alexander (1995). Excellent Cadavers: The Mafia and the Death of the First Italian Republic. London: Jonathan Cape. ISBN 0-224-03761-7.
