= Giuseppe Greco =

Italian mafioso and hitman (1952–1985)

- Giuseppe "Scarpuzzedda" Greco (undated photograph)
- Born: 4 January 1952; Ciaculli, Italy
- Died: September 1985 (aged 33); Ciaculli, Italy
- Cause of death: Gunshot to the head
- Occupation: Mafioso
- Allegiance: Sicilian Mafia
- Criminal charge: Multiple murder
- Penalty: Life imprisonment (sentence in absentia and post mortem)

Giuseppe Greco (Italian: [dʒuˈzɛppe ˈɡrɛːko]; 4 January 1952 – September 1985) was an Italian hitman and high-ranking member of the Sicilian Mafia. A number of sources refer to him exclusively as Pino Greco, although Giuseppe was his Christian name; Pino is a frequent abbreviation of the name Giuseppe.

One of the most prolific killers in criminal history, he was affiliated with the Ciaculli mafia family. Despite his surname, he was not related to the boss of Ciaculli Salvatore "Ciaschiteddu" Greco nor to the boss of Croceverde-Giardini Michele Greco. His father was also a Mafioso nicknamed Scarpa (Italian for "shoe"), hence his nickname of Scarpuzzedda, or "little shoe".

== Early life ==
He was born in 1952 in Ciaculli, an outlying town in the province of Palermo, the administrative centre of Sicily. At school, he reportedly excelled in Latin and Greek. It is not known when he joined the Mafia but according to pentito Gaspare Mutolo, he started off as a driver for Kalsa boss Tommaso Spadaro, whose nephew was Giuseppe Lucchese, who would go on to become Greco's best friend and accomplice in many murders. By 1979, Giuseppe Greco had increased his influence and power considerably, and he sat on the Sicilian Mafia Commission alongside Michele Greco, who by that point began controlling the entire Ciaculli-Croceverde Giardini-Brancaccio mandamento. This was an unusual arrangement as, with the exception of the Corleone family, only one boss was normally allowed to be on the Commission for each family.

The Croceverde-Giardini cosca was closely allied with the Corleonesi, and specifically with their bosses, Salvatore Riina and Bernardo Provenzano, who would come to dominate the Sicilian Mafia in a violent Mafia war.

== Criminal career ==
During the Second Mafia War from 1981 until 1984, orchestrated by the Corleonesi, Giuseppe Greco carried out dozens of murders, often with his favourite weapon, the AK-47 rifle. He was eventually convicted in absentia of 58 murders, most of them committed during the early 1980s, but it is believed he committed at least 80 murders in total and possibly as many as 300.

Greco killed Stefano Bontade, Salvatore Inzerillo, Pio La Torre and police officer Ninni Cassarà in 1985. He murdered Inzerillo's fifteen-year-old son after the youth vowed to avenge his murdered father. Greco is rumoured to have chopped the boy's arm off before shooting him in the head and dissolving his corpse in acid.

On 25 June 1981, he failed in his attempt to ambush and kill future pentito Salvatore Contorno, and Contorno managed to shoot his would-be assassin in the chest, in a bulletproof vest, saving Greco's life. Greco and his accomplices would subsequently retaliate against Contorno by murdering many of his friends and relatives in an ultimately unsuccessful effort to flush him out.

He rarely worked alone, instead leading a "death squad" that included Mario Prestifilippo, Antonino Madonia, Filippo Marchese, Vincenzo Puccio, Gianbattista Pullarà, Giuseppe Lucchese, Calogero Ganci and Giuseppe Giacomo Gambino. Like Greco, they were all fugitives with numerous warrants issued for their arrest.

He participated in the so-called "Christmas Massacre" when, on the afternoon of 25 December 1981, in Bagheria, three Mafiosi – including Giovanni Di Peri, the boss of Villabate – and an innocent bystander were murdered. Filippo Marchese and his nephew Giuseppe also took part in the bloodshed. In the summer of 1982, he also participated in the Circonvallazione massacre and in the Via Carini massacre, where prefect Carlo Alberto dalla Chiesa and his wife were shot to death with an AK-47 by Nino Madonia. Dalla Chiesa's escort, police officer Domenico Russo, was also mortally wounded

Greco worked particularly closely with Filippo Marchese, the boss of the Corso dei Mille neighbourhood in Palermo and another close ally of the Corleonesi. Marchese ran the so-called "Room of Death", a small apartment along the Piazza Sant Erasmo where victims were tortured and murdered before being thrown into vats of acid or dismembered then dumped out in the Mediterranean. According to pentito Vincenzo Sinagra, Greco helped Marchese carry out many killings there; he and Marchese garotting victims together, looping a length of rope around the victim's neck and each of them pulling on one end. Sinagra said it was usually his duty to hold the victim's kicking feet. At the end of the summer of 1982, Greco murdered Marchese on the orders of Riina. The Mafia War was dying down, and Riina had decided Marchese was no longer of any use.

On 30 November 1982, Greco strangled to death Palermo boss Rosario Riccobono, the long-time ruler of the Partanna-Mondello family. Both Riccobono and Noce boss Salvatore Scaglione had originally been close allies to Stefano Bontade and Salvatore Inzerillo, only to later betray them and kill a number of their own friends and associates on behalf of Riina when it became clear the Corleonesi were winning the war. However, when they had outlived his usefulness, Riina decided to have them eliminated. The Corleonesi invited Riccobono, Scaglione and three other men to a meeting in a country villa between San Giuseppe Jato and Monreale, and shortly after their arrival, they were separated and massacred by Pino Greco, Giovanni Brusca and their team of killers. Following the massacre, many men loyal to both bosses were murdered in Palermo.

By then, Greco was believed to be the underboss of the Ciaculli family. Rather than delegate murders to his underlings, however, he continued to take part in them himself. On 29 July 1983 he and Nino Madonia parked the car bomb, a Fiat 126 loaded with explosives, that killed magistrate Rocco Chinnici and three other people: the two carabinieri of the escort (marshall Mario Trapassi and corporal Salvatore Bartolotta) and Stefano Li Sacchi, the porter of the building in Via Pipitone where Chinnici lived. The one survivor was Giovanni Paparcuri, the driver of Chinnici's car.

== Later years ==
By the end of the Second Mafia War, he was one of the most prominent of the new generation of Mafiosi who had distinguished themselves in the Second Mafia War, and reportedly acted like he was the boss of Ciaculli, whilst the actual boss, Michele Greco, was in hiding. He had also built up a following of younger Mafiosi who looked up to him, even more so than they did to the Corleonesi bosses. Riina apparently felt the need to reduce the strength of the Ciaculli Family by eliminating its most prominent killers, starting with Scarpuzzedda.

To weaken Greco's position, Riina ordered the massacre of Piazza Scaffa, when eight people were killed in the Ciaculli mandamento. The victims were gunned down with shotguns in a barn. Greco was not informed as part of a deliberate strategy to show his lack of effective power over the territory under his jurisdiction.

One of his last crimes was leading a large hit squad that ambushed and shot to death police investigator Antonino Cassarà on 6 August 1985. One of Cassarà's bodyguards (Roberto Antiochia) also died, and another one, Natale Mondo, was unharmed, only to be killed on 14 January 1988. Three years earlier, Cassarà had issued a report leading to the arrest of 163 prominent Mafiosi, including Giuseppe Greco, the members of his death squad, and Michele Greco.

== Death ==
Sometime in September 1985, a month after Cassarà's assassination, Greco was murdered in his home. He was shot to death by his two fellow mafiosi and supposed friends, Vincenzo Puccio and Giuseppe Lucchese, although the orders came from Riina, who had felt Greco was getting too ambitious and too independent-minded for his liking. Puccio was captured the following year for an unrelated murder and was himself murdered in his cell in 1989. Lucchese was captured in 1990 and imprisoned for other unrelated murders. Greco's elimination was the first of several by the Corleonesi in order to weaken the Ciaculli clan. Two years later, one of Greco's accomplices and fellow Ciaculli killer, Mario Prestifilippo, was shot dead, reportedly also on Riina's orders.

Giuseppe Greco was given an in absentia life sentence as part of the Maxi Trial in 1987 after being found guilty of 58 counts of murder, even though he was dead by then. As a strategy to delay and weaken the reactions of Greco's followers, Riina ordered the body to be dissolved in acid, whilst in the meantime he told other Mafiosi that Greco was in hiding in the United States. Rumours of Greco's death surfaced in 1988, and these were confirmed to the authorities by an informant, Francesco Marino Mannoia, only the following year.

Francesco's brother, Agostino Marino Mannoia, was present at Greco's murder, although only as a witness; he told his brother Francesco that he did not know the killing was due to take place. Agostino said that he was downstairs in Greco's house with another Mafioso whilst their host was upstairs talking with Puccio and Lucchese. After hearing shots, Agostino ran upstairs to see Greco lying dead and Puccio and Lucchese standing over him, the latter holding a smoking gun and subsequently explaining that he and Puccio had taken care of a problem on behalf of Riina. Agostino explained all this to his brother Francesco, and it was Agostino's murder in early 1989 that prompted Francesco to become an informant.

Another informant who had been one of Greco's friends, Salvatore Cancemi, subsequently told investigators that shortly after Greco's death, Riina had approached him and explained to Cancemi: "You know we've found the medicine for madmen?...We've killed "Little Shoe"; he'd become crazy."

== References and external links ==
- Paoli, Letizia (2003) Mafia Brotherhoods: Organized Crime, Italian Style, New York: Oxford University Press ISBN 0-19-515724-9
- Follain, John (2008) The Last Godfathers: The Rise and Fall of the Mafia's Most Powerful Family, Hodder & Stoughton, ISBN 978-0-340-93651-1
- Dickie, John (2004) Cosa Nostra: A History of the Sicilian Mafia, Hodder and Stoughton ISBN 0-340-82435-2
- Stille, Alexander (1995) Excellent Cadavers. The Mafia and the Death of the First Italian Republic, New York: Vintage ISBN 0-09-959491-9
