= Giuseppe Lucchese =

Member of the Sicilian Mafia

- Mugshot of Lucchese
- Born: 2 September 1958 (age 68); Palermo, Sicily, Italy
- Other names: "Lucchiseddu" "Occhi di ghiaccio" (Eyes of Ice)
- Occupation: Mafioso
- Status: Imprisoned since 1990
- Allegiance: Brancaccio Mafia family / Sicilian Mafia
- Criminal charge: Multiple murder
- Penalty: Life imprisonment

Giuseppe Lucchese (Italian: [dʒuˈzɛppe lukˈkeːze; -eːse]; born 2 September 1958), known as Lucchiseddu and Occhi di ghiaccio (Eyes of ice), is a member of the Sicilian Mafia from the Brancaccio neighbourhood in Palermo. He was one of the favourite hitmen of the Corleonesi, headed by Totò Riina, during the Second Mafia War in 1981–84.

Lucchese and Vincenzo Puccio murdered their boss Giuseppe "Pino" Greco in 1985. Puccio replaced Greco and Lucchese became his substitute. Lucchese was given a life sentence in absentia as part of the Maxi Trial in 1987. After the killing of Puccio on 11 May 1989, Lucchese became the capo mandamento of the Ciaculli-Brancaccio mafia families.

Lucchese is suspected of being one of the accomplices in the murders of the mafiosi Stefano Bontade and Salvatore Inzerillo. He was arrested on 1 April 1990, and imprisoned for multiple murders. He received a life sentence for the murder of Carabinieri General Carlo Alberto Dalla Chiesa and the communist politician Pio La Torre both in 1982. He has been accused of 50 murders.
