= Croceverde =

- Frazione
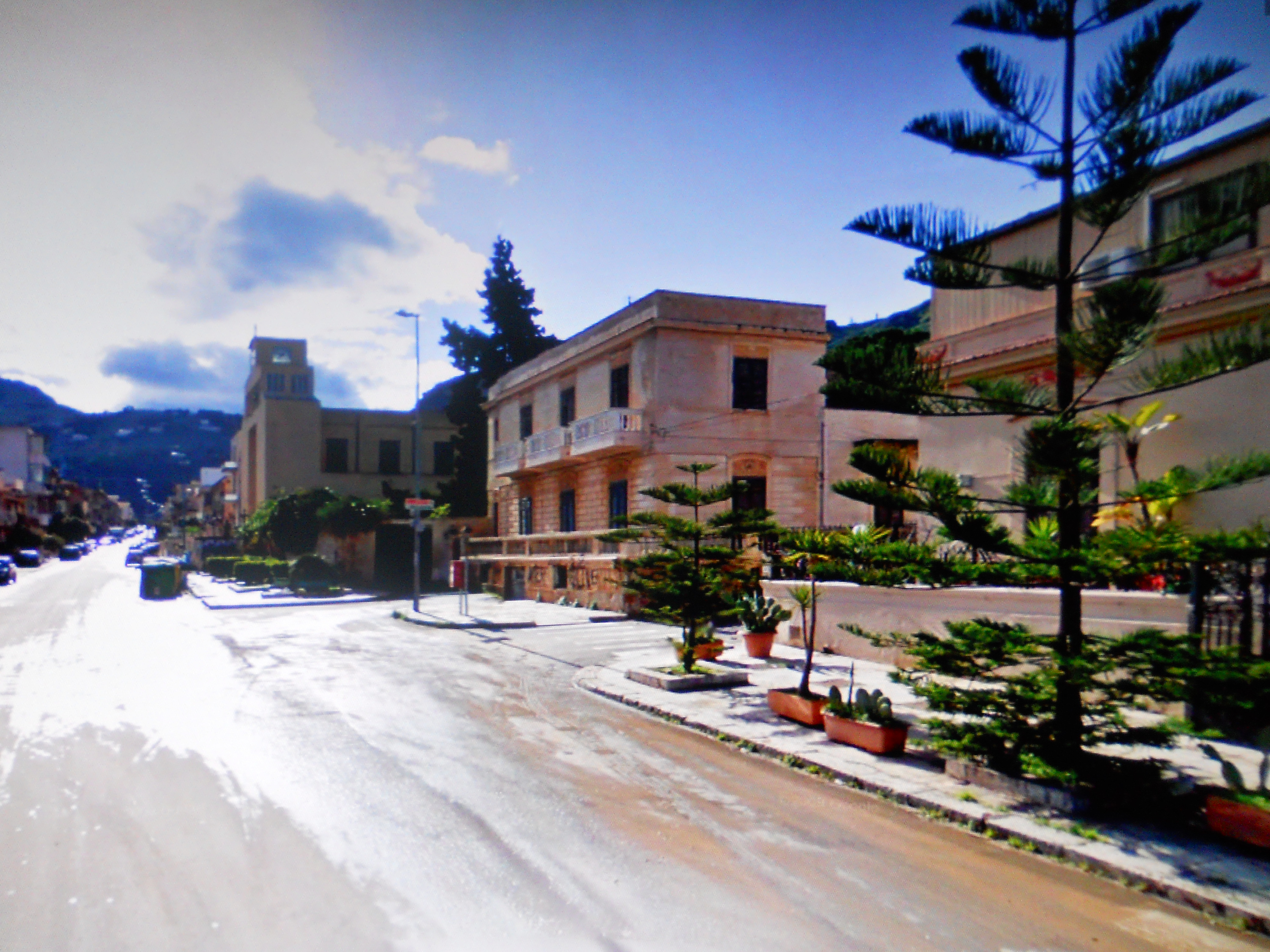

- Location of Croceverde in Italy
- Coordinates: 38.0702134°N 13.4165647°E
- Country: Italy
- Region: Sicily
- Metropolitan city: Palermo (PA)
- Comune: Palermo
- Time zone: UTC+1 (CET)
  - Summer (DST): UTC+2 (CEST)

Croceverde is an outlying suburb of Palermo, Sicily in Italy. It has less than 5000 residents. Croceverde is close to the suburb of Ciaculli. It has been important within the history of the Cosa Nostra, and is relatively rural in character.

The town grows unique mandarin oranges, Mandarino Tardivo di Ciaculli D.O.P., and to ensure the survival of this crop, restrictions on building activity have been established in Croceverde.
