= Villabate =

- Comune
- Comune di Villabate
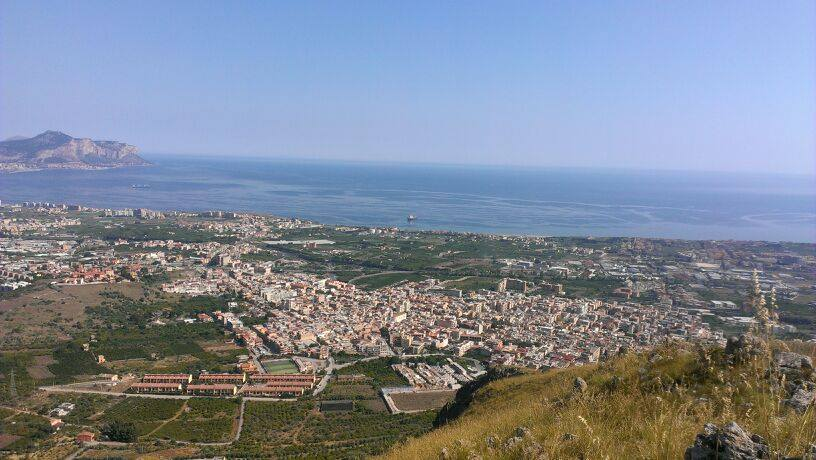

- Location within Italy Location within Sicily
- Coordinates: 38°5′N 13°27′E
- Country: Italy
- Region: Sicily
- Metropolitan city: Palermo

Area
  - Total: 3.80 km^{2} (1.47 sq mi)
- Elevation: 47 m (154 ft)

Population (2026)
  - Total: 19,380
  - Density: 5,100/km^{2} (13,200/sq mi)
- Demonym: Villabatesi
- Time zone: UTC+1 (CET)
  - Summer (DST): UTC+2 (CEST)
- Postal code: 90039
- Dialing code: 091

Villabate (Sicilian: Villabbati) is a town and comune (municipality) in the Metropolitan City of Palermo in the autonomous island region of Sicily in Italy, located about 8 kilometres (5 mi) southeast of Palermo. With a population of 19,380 in an area of 3.80 square kilometres (1.47 sq mi), it is the most densely populated municipality of Sicily.

Villabate borders the municipalities of Ficarazzi, Misilmeri, and Palermo.

== Etymology ==
The name appears in the later half of the 15th century when the abbot of the Abbey of Santo Spirito in Palermo, Giovanni de Osca, built a tower there, later incorporated into the Migliaccio-Termine palace, along with several houses and a warehouse. Over time, the original nucleus expanded, becoming the "Villaggio dell'Abbate" - Village of the Abbot.

== Demographics ==
As of 2026, the population is 19,380, of which 48.8% are male, and 51.2% are female. Minors make up 20.4% of the population, and seniors make up 18.5%.

Historical population

Year	Pop.	±%
1861	2,438	—
1871	2,508	+2.9%
1881	3,156	+25.8%
1901	4,095	+29.8%
1911	5,590	+36.5%
1921	6,411	+14.7%
1931	6,421	+0.2%
1936	6,992	+8.9%

Year	Pop.	±%
1951	8,097	+15.8%
1961	9,213	+13.8%
1971	10,353	+12.4%
1981	12,659	+22.3%
1991	14,877	+17.5%
2001	18,371	+23.5%
2011	19,819	+7.9%
2021	19,731	−0.4%

Source: ISTAT

=== Immigration ===
As of 2025, of the known countries of birth of 19,411 residents, the most numerous are: Italy (18,911 – 97.4%), Morocco (274 – 1.4%).

== Notable people ==
- Joe Profaci, Mafia boss and founder of the Colombo crime family (1897-1962)
- Luigi Zarcone, athlete (1950-2001)
