= Ciaculli =

Suburb of Palermo, Sicily, Italy

Coordinates: 38°04′36″N 13°24′17″E

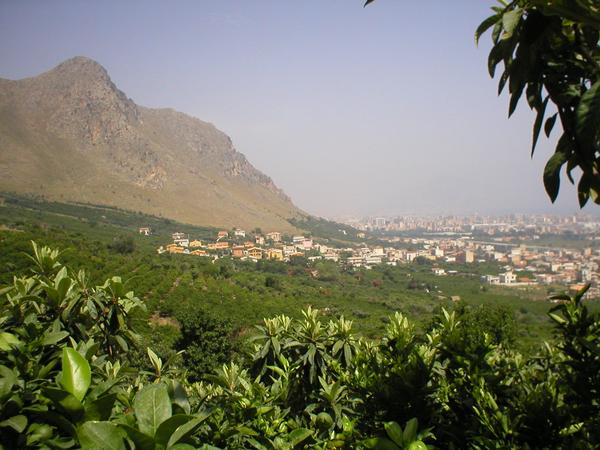
A view of Ciaculli with Palermo on the background and Monte Grifone on the left

Ciaculli is an outlying village (or frazione) of Palermo, Sicily, Italy. It is located in the south-eastern area of Palermo Metropolitan City. It counts fewer than 9,500 residents. Ciaculli is close to the suburb of Croceverde.

It is one of the last countryside area still dedicated to agricultural activities in the municipality (or comune). The suburb is separated from the city centre by the A19 motorway, which form its northern border. The southern border is delimited by the slopes of Mount Griffith (Italian: Monte Grifone).

== Organized crime ==
Ciaculli was an important place in the history of Cosa Nostra, the Sicilian mafia. Greco Mafia clan was originally from this place and, given its notoriety in the news, linked the village to the image of organized crime.

In 1963 the suburb was marked by frequent clashes during the First Mafia War. On June 30, 1963, seven police and military officers lost their lives due to a car bomb, which according to later reconstructions was intended for the mafia boss Salvatore Greco. The event, which triggered a strong reaction from the Italian government and led to the creation of the Antimafia Commission, is known as the Ciaculli massacre.

In the 1980s the Second Mafia War brought a new series of attacks and murders to Ciaculli. The Grecos split into two factions, one close to the new Corleonesi, an alliance of Mafia families led by mafiosi from Corleone, and the other close to the Palermo old clans. In 1982, mafia member and hitman Giuseppe Greco, after surviving an ambush, forced the residents of the suburb who did not offer guarantees for his safety to leave.

Between 2019 and 2024, a series of investigations by the police forces of Italy shown that the Grecos still play a significant role in the management of criminal activities conducted in Ciaculli, especially the money extortion (or pizzo) from local businesses and money laundering. In January 2019 a police raid foiled an attempt by new bosses, including Michele Greco's nephew, to restore the old mafia dome.
