= I mafiusi di la Vicarìa =

Sicilian-language play

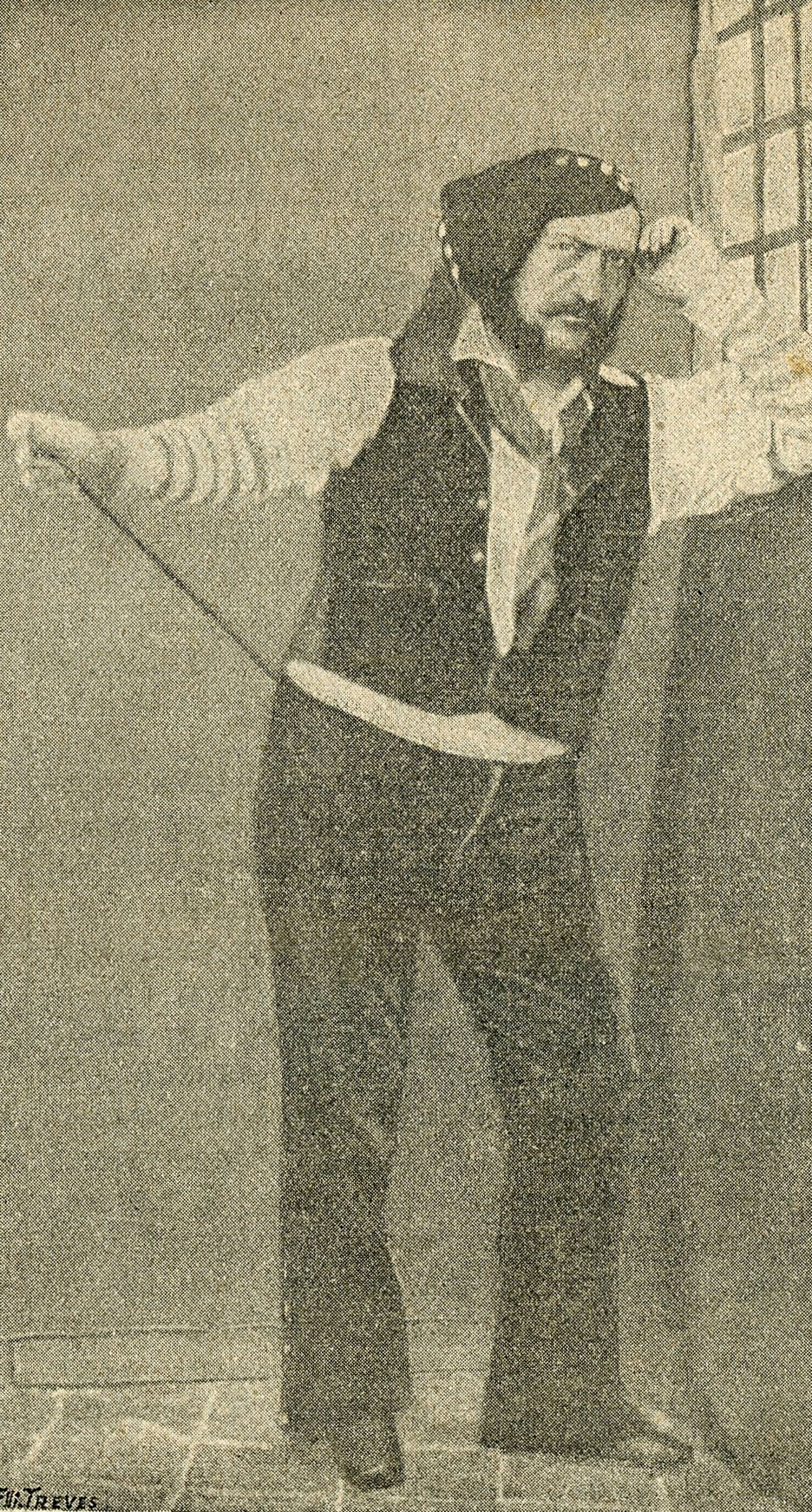
Author of the play Giuseppe Rizzotto in the role of one of the mafiusi

I mafiusi di la Vicarìa ("The mafiosi of Vicaria Prison") is a Sicilian-language play in three acts by Giuseppe Rizzotto and Gaspare Mosca, first performed in 1863. It tells the story of a group of prisoners in Palermo who are members of a hierarchical criminal organization with distinct practices. It is the first literary representation of the mafia.

In the first two acts, the characters and their way of life in prison are introduced, and there is no strong plot. Iachinu Funciazza is the boss of the organization or capo camorrista. A police informer, Don Nunzio, provokes conflict between Iachinu and his subordinates. An unnamed political prisoner (who may be a representation of the Italian patriot Francesco Crispi) arrives and whispers something to Iachinu, who commands the others to treat the political prisoner with the utmost respect. The second act ends with the murder of the police informer. In the third act, Iachinu is out of prison and has left behind the criminal life. His old comrades try to involve him in their criminal endeavors, and when he refuses to join them, they attack him. They are stopped by the arrival of the political prisoner. Iachinu joins a mutual aid society and asks for forgiveness on behalf of the other mafiusi so that they can also become upright citizens of the new, unified Italy.

The play was highly successful: it was performed 55 times just in 1863 and staged at least 2000 times in Southern Italian and Roman theaters over the course of 21 years. It is most likely the origin of the common usage of the term mafioso (from which derives mafia) to mean a member of a particular kind of Southern Italian criminal organization. Prior to this, the common term for such an organization was camorra, whose members were called camorristi. The play highlights various familiar aspects of mafia life and organization, including an initiation ritual, the existence of ranks, and the demanding of protection money (pizzu). An adaptation by the Italian author Leonardo Sciascia was written in 1965 and first performed in 1966.

== Characters ==
- Iachinu Funciazza – boss or capo camorrista of the criminal organization
- Mìnicu Chiantedda – camorrista proprietario, a senior member of the organization
- Turiddu lu Masticusu – a member of the organization
- Totò lu Spanucchiatu – a member of the organization
- Ricu Balata – a young novice (mezza pampina) of the organization
- Don Leonardo – a prisoner who is ignorant of prison life and does not speak Sicilian. His misunderstandings serve as an opportunity for the language and practices of the mafiusi to be explained to the audience.
- Don Nunzio – a police informer
- The Incognito – a political prisoner. According to G. G. Loschiavo, actors who had worked with Rizzotto attested that the playwright meant for the Incognito to be understood as Francesco Crispi, the Italian patriot and native of Sicily who later served as prime minister of Italy.
- Pasquale – Iachinu's apprentice after he becomes a cobbler
- Carmela – Iachinu's wife
- Mìnicu's wife

== Synopsis ==
The play is about a group of inmates of the former Vicaria prison in Palermo who are members of a hierarchical criminal organization, which is called a camorra in the text (the word mafia is never used and the word mafiusi appears only in the title). Iachinu Funciazza is the boss or capo camorrista, who controls all activity in his section of the prison. A hierarchy of other camorristi is subjected to Funciazza, described in order of seniority as the camorrista proprietario Mìnicu Chiantedda, the camorristi Turiddu lu Masticusu and Totò lu Spanucchiatu, and the mezza pampina ('immature' or 'learner'), a young man named Ricu Balata. There is no strong plot in the first two acts, which are set in 1854; rather, there is a folkloristic depiction of the working of the mafia. There are scenes involving the use of the knife, including one in which the younger camorristi are trained in knife-fighting. Mìnicu has his wife smuggle his knife in to him, and skill with the knife is shown as the means by which the hierarchy of individuals in the organization is established. There are scenes which depict gambling and other parts of mafia prison life, including the demand for money or pizzu from newly arrived prisoners.

There are three other characters who are not members of the camorra. Don Leonardo, who is ignorant about prison life and does not speak Sicilian, is the target of the jokes of the mafiusi, although he is protected by Iachinu. Don Nunzio, a police informer, provokes conflict between Iachinu and his subordinates by suggesting that an ambitious younger member could replace him as leader. He is also responsible for spying on a political prisoner, who is about to be placed in prison with the other inmates. In this way, he incurs the wrath of the camorra, and at the end of the second act he is stabbed to death. The aforementioned political prisoner, called the Incognito, is told to pay the pizzu. He whispers something to Iachinu, which prompts him to tell the others that the Incognito must be treated with the utmost respect.

In the third act, the mafiusi have been released from prison. Iachinu has returned to his wife Carmela and is working as a cobbler in Palermo. He wants to leave behind his criminal past to support his family through honest means. However, Iachinu's old comrades Mìnicu, Turiddu, and Totò arrive and ask him to join them in their criminal endeavors. Iachinu's refusal angers his former companions, and they decide to attack him. Their attack is stopped by the sudden arrival of the Incognito, with a revolver in hand. The Incognito, gives Iachinu his diploma of acceptance into the "workers' mutual aid society" (società operaia di mutuo soccorso). The play ends with Iachinu asking for forgiveness on behalf of the other mafiusi so that they can also become upright citizens of the new, unified Italy.

== Background and productions ==
The play originally consisted of only two acts, based on material by Gaspare Mosca, who worked at the Teatro Sant'Anna in Palermo between 1862 and 1864. The first performance was based on this version. Giuseppe Rizzotto, who was an actor and writer at that theater at the time, gave the play its final three-act form. The play is now typically referred to under Rizzotto's sole authorship. According to an unverified account, the author gained his knowledge about the criminal world of Palermo from an insider, Gioachino D'Angelo, also known as Funciazza (the name of a character in the play), who was slashed in retaliation for this violation.

The play was highly successful: it was performed 55 times just in 1863 and staged at least 2000 times in Southern Italian and Roman theaters over the course of 21 years. One production was attended by King Umberto I of Italy. Rizzotto toured the Americas in 1875, after which he wrote two other plays titled I mafiusi all'Osteria and I mafiusi in progresso, which are described in the 1936 Enciclopedia Italiana as "less original and less successful" than I mafiusi di la Vicarìa.

== Analysis ==
The play is the first literary representation of the mafia and highlights various familiar aspects of mafia life and organization, including an initiation ritual, the existence of ranks, and the demanding of protection money, which the mafiusi of the play call pizzu (literally meaning "beak" in Sicilian)—as do modern-day mafiosi. The criminal organization in the play claims that it can influence Sicilian politics and administration. The depiction of the Vicaria prison also corresponds to its real-life role as a center for Sicilian organized crime. John Dickie describes the play as "the first ever version of the myth of the good mafia, a mafia that is honourable and protects the weak."

There are dramatic incongruences between the first two acts and the third, which was added later. The first two acts give a "colourful, sympathetic" portrayal of the mafiusi, but this is absent in the third act, where Iachinu has abandoned his criminal past and wants to live honestly. Gerard Slowey writes that Iachinu's transformation is unconvincing, and that "the unexpected appearance of the Incognito has an unwelcome element of farce." Slowey explains the addition of the third act with its different tone as the result of recent political developments: instead of mere criminals, the author wanted to present an image of a "reforming society" in the wake of Garibaldi's landing in Sicily and the unification of Italy. In the first two acts, the character of the Incognito "hints at the link between supporters of the Revolution and the mafia", and the Incognito's granting of a diploma to Iachinu represents the new regime's recognition of the help rendered by the mafia as well as forgiveness for their past crimes.

== Use of the term mafioso ==
Despite the fact that it appears only in the title, the play is most likely the origin of the common usage of the term mafioso (from which derives mafia) to mean a member of a particular kind of Southern Italian criminal organization. Prior to this, the common term for such an organization was camorra, whose members were called camorristi, as they are in the text of the play. The term mafioso existed before the play, but it did not originally have the criminal association that it later acquired. In nineteenth-century Sicily, mafiusu was an ambiguous term which signified a man who was "a bully, arrogant but also fearless, enterprising and proud." For example, a probably apocryphal source indicates that the title derived from an angry question overheard on a street in Palermo: "Chi vurrissi fari u mafiusu cu mia? " (Are you trying to be arrogant with me?) The term mafiusi may have been placed in the title at the last minute "to help give the piece the kind of local flavour that a Palermo audience would expect." According to Diego Gambetta, the extraordinary success of the play can explain how it was able to popularize the term mafioso. John Dickie writes that the play could not have been the sole reason for the spread of the term, and that it only when the Italian authorities began using the words mafioso and mafia that the terms became widespread. The term pizzu in the sense of "protection money" also may have been popularized by the play.

== Leonardo Sciascia's adaptation ==
The Italian author Leonardo Sciascia (a native of Sicily) wrote an adaptation of the play, I mafiosi, which was written in 1965 and first performed at the Piccolo Teatro of Milano in March 1966. Sciascia's adaptation is written in Italian, not Sicilian, and the character of Iachinu is called Gioacchino. The first part is set during the revolt in April 1860 that preceded Garibaldi's expedition to Sicily. It follows the first two acts of Rizzotto's version in its general lines, with some differences in emphasis. In the second part, Gioacchino, now dressed in fine clothes, is out of prison and procuring votes for an unnamed official (called sua eccellenza 'His Excellency'). He explains his cynical worldview to Ricu: he disdains "the people" and is in favor of all revolutions because of the opportunities they create for personal gain, regardless of who emerges victorious. Later, it is revealed that the unnamed official for whom Gioacchino is working is the Incognito from the first part of the play. When one of the official's political opponents accuses the mafioso Turi of murder, the naïve Don Leonardo is induced by Gioacchino to provide him with an alibi. The play ends with sua eccellenza being welcomed by a cheering crowd after his victory in the election.

== Texts ==
The play was published under the title I mafiusi in 1885. The Sicilian text of the play along with an Italian translation can be found in G. G. Loschiavo's book Cento anni di mafia, published in 1962. Sciascia's adaptation I mafiosi was published in the periodical Il Dramma in 1972 and reprinted in a separate volume along with two other theatrical works in 1976.
