= Libero Grassi =

Italian clothing manufucturer

- Born: 19 July 1924; Catania, Italy
- Died: 29 August 1991 (aged 67); Palermo, Italy
- Occupation: Clothing manufacturer
- Known for: Killed by the Mafia after taking a solitary stand against their extortion demands

Libero Grassi (Italian pronunciation: [ˈliːbero ˈɡrassi]; 19 July 1924 – 29 August 1991) was an Italian clothing manufacturer from Palermo, Sicily, who was killed by the Mafia after taking a solitary stand against their extortion demands.

The businessman wrote an open letter to the local newspaper informing the extortionists that he was no longer willing to pay pizzo, a Sicilian term for protection money. Other business-owners and shopkeepers in Palermo refused to join his public campaign. Grassi was gunned down in the street near his home eight months after writing the letter.

Grassi was born in Catania, was married, and had a son and a daughter. Following his death, his family have continued his campaign, lending their support to the Addiopizzo movement that is against pizzo.

== Pizzo demands ==
Grassi ran the Sigma factory producing men's underwear and pyjamas in Palermo. The company had around 100 employees and a business volume of US$5 million in 1990. Like many businessmen in the city, he was soon subjected to demands to pay "pizzo" or face the consequences. The pizzo – a form of protection racket – is demanded by the Mafia to local businesses and the refusal to pay can mean vandalism or arson attacks on places of business, or even physical harm, including murder, if demands are not met.

== Refusal to pay pizzo ==
In late 1990, Grassi began to refuse to pay, as did an estimated 50% of Palermo businesses. The extortionists demanded money "for their poor friends in jail" and threatened to kill him. On 10 January 1991, Grassi wrote an open letter in the Giornale di Sicilia, a Palermo daily, that began "Dear extortionist," in which he denounced the Mafia's demands for protection money and publicly announced his refusal to pay. The same day, he reported the names of his extortionists to the police, a move that resulted in five arrests in March.

The morning after the letter was published, the Mayor of Palermo, the prosecutor, the colonel of the federal police, and the press showed up at his factory to show support. However, even after he got police protection, two strangers appeared who claimed to be health inspectors and threatened the workers once they were inside. Grassi became something of a national hero in Italy after appearing on nationwide TV on 11 April 1991 on Michele Santoro's Samarcanda on Rai Tre.

However, instead of receiving solidarity from other shopkeepers and businesses for his refusal to pay protection money, he was criticised, gradually isolated, and accused of demolishing the image of the Palermo business world. In his interviews, he denounced the Mafia and also the way that many of his fellow businessmen seemed to shun him, and how even customers ceased to frequent his store in fear of being caught in the wrath of the Mafia, which Grassi was provoking with his stance. Grassi stated in an interview:

My colleagues have begun to attack me, saying that one should not wash dirty clothes in public. But in the meantime they continue to put up with it; because I know that they all pay. In my opinion, being intimidated and being collusive is the same thing. Some confess to giving in out of fear, others boast about having important strings to pull. These are very common attitudes; but I think that if everyone was ready to collaborate with the police and carabinieri, to report and to name names, this racketeering would not last long.

== Death and aftermath ==
Grassi eventually had his shop broken into in early 1991, and the exact amount of money that had been demanded of him was stolen. An unsuccessful arson attack on his shop soon followed. The 67-year-old Grassi was gunned down in the Via Vittorio Alfieri in Palermo at 7:30 in the morning on 29 August 1991, less than a year after taking his stance angainst the Mafia. He was shot in the head three times as he walked from his home to his car. No witnesses came forward. After the killing, 10,000 people took to the streets to protest his murder.

On 26 September 1991, TV hosts Santoro and Maurizio Costanzo dedicated a joint five-hour live nationwide television programme to the memory of Grassi in a unique cooperation between the public Rai Tre and the private Canale 5. The first part of the programme, named "Per Libero Grassi", was televised live by Rai from Teatro Biondo in Palermo, hosted by Santoro with a. o. the city's mayor present. After 11 p.m., Canale 5 took over with Costanzo as host and the participation of anti-Mafia judge Giovanni Falcone, himself later murdered by the Mafia, as a guest. The event became coined as the "relay race for Libero Grassi" and was characterized as "one of the most important civil and media events in Italian history." Nevertheless, it was not until 2004 that the grassroots movement Addiopizzo finally broke the silence and stimulated public support in the matter.

Grassi's wife, Pina Maisano, and their children, Davide and Alice, tried to keep the family firm going. "I was terrified for their safety so, as the threats continued after Libero's killing, we reluctantly agreed to allow a state holding to run the company with Davide keeping a share," Pina recalled. It eventually went bankrupt.

=== Killers convicted ===
It took some time, but killer Mafioso Salvatore "Salvino" Madonia and his father Francesco Madonia, the unquestioned patriarch of the Resuttana Mafia family in Palermo, were eventually brought to justice. According to a Mafia turncoat, Salvatore Madonia personally killed Grassi. A large trial in October 2006 saw thirty mobsters convicted of sixty murders dating back a quarter of a century, with the Madonias convicted of Grassi's slaying.

One hundred shopkeepers in Palermo publicly declared their refusal to pay extortion to the Mafia in 2006, not long after Mafia boss Bernardo Provenzano was arrested, with Grassi's widow, Pina and children Davide and Alice in attendance at public rallies denouncing the Mafia jointly with the Addiopizzo movement.

His wife and children put up a placard on the spot where he was killed in the Via Vittorio Alfieri, which says:

Here was murdered Libero Grassi, entrepreneur, brave man, killed by the Mafia, by the omertà of the associations of industrialists, by the indifference of parties and absence of the state.

Every year on 29 August, people gather at the site to commemorate the act of Grassi and protest against extortion.

Since the late 2000s not only Palermo has named a street after Libero Grassi, several other communities have a via (or piazza) Libero Grassi, Alcamo (Trapani) in Sicily, as well as Naples (in Scampia and Sant'Anastasia), Tuscania (Lazio) and in northern Turin (Piemont) or Lombardian Ossona, Osnago, Ornago and Muggiò

== See also ==
- List of victims of the Sicilian Mafia
