= Gazzetta del Sud =

- Front page, 21 November 2011 (Messina edition)
- Type: Daily newspaper
- Format: Tabloid
- Owner(s): Società Editrice Siciliana
- Founded: 13 April 1952; 73 years ago
- Political alignment: Independent
- Language: Italian
- Headquarters: Messina, Italy
- Circulation: 49,872 (2008)
- Website: http://www.gazzettadelsud.it/

Gazzetta del Sud (lit. 'Gazette of the South') is an Italian national daily newspaper for the south of Italy. The paper is published in Messina. Since 2017, it owns also the Giornale di Sicilia.

== History and profile ==
Gazzetta del Sud was founded in 1952 in Messina, Sicily by the Italian businessman and member of Liberal Party Uberto Bonino. Since 2006, it has been published in tabloid format. The paper has an independent political stance.

Gazzetta del Sud is one of the most important newspapers published in Southern Italy; has the largest readership in Calabria and is the third-most read newspaper in Sicily, after the Giornale di Sicilia and La Sicilia. In 2008 the circulation of the paper was 49,872 copies.

The paper publishes 5 different local editions: Messina, Reggio Calabria, Cosenza, Catanzaro-Crotone-Lamezia-Vibo and Catania-Ragusa-Siracusa.

== See also ==
- List of newspapers in Italy
- Giornale di Sicilia
- La Sicilia
