= Sangiorgi report =

Series of reports on the mafia in Sicily

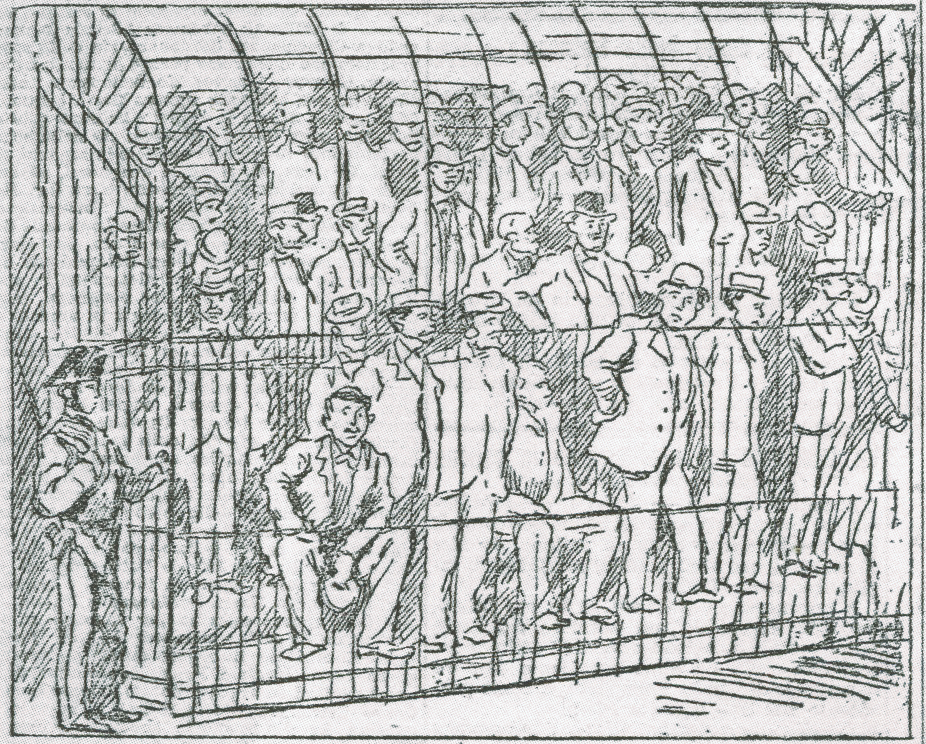
Drawing of the alleged mafiosi arrested by Sangiorgi, published on the newspaper L'Ora (May 1901).

Sangiorgi report is the name given to a series of notes and reports on the mafia in Sicily by the questore of Palermo Ermanno Sangiorgi and sent to the ministry of the Interior. It is composed of 31 reports, for a total of 485 pages, written between November 1898 and February 1900. The report contains the first complete picture of Cosa Nostra to be made and the first official document that defines the mafia as a criminal organization founded on an oath and primarily focusing on protection racket as its main activity.

Of romagnol origins, Sangiorgi arrived in Palermo in August 1898, after having served in other Sicilian cities and having achieved considerable successes against criminal groups in the west of the island. The biggest operation he took part in was against the so called "Brotherhood of Favara", a criminal organization operating in Favara in the province of Agrigento in the late 19th century. Thanks to Sangiorgi's efforts, more than 200 people were arrested in the area of Favara for several murders committed by the organization. One of the leaders of the brotherhood was arrested, wearing a cloak while he was in the process of initiating two members into the group, and on his arrest police found a written list of the rules of the organization. This was followed by the discovery of dozens of skeletons of victims of the "brotherhood" hidden in remote locations such as caves, drained ponds, and disused zolfare. Confessions by some of the affiliates led to the recovery of further variants of the organization's rules, and also its hierarchy: one or more capi-testa ruled over several capidecina, every one of whom had no more than ten affiliates under him; the initiation ritual involved piercing the new member's index finger with a small spike, and let the blood drip on a paper image of a saint, which was then burnt as the affiliate recited the oath of loyalty. this ceremony was typical of the cosche of Palermo, of which many members of the "brotherhood" had been in contact with in 1879, during imprisonment with Palermitan mafiosi in the jail of Ustica. In 1885 all members were put on trial in Agrigento, and many recanted their confessions, claiming they had been obtained under torture, but nonetheless most of them were convicted and imprisoned.

== The investigation ==
When the new questor arrived in Palermo, the city was in the middle of a mafia war, which had begun two years earlier, in 1896. In 1899 Sangiorgi carried out two of his most famous arrests, that of the member of parliament Raffaele Palizzolo and the mafia boss Giuseppe Fontana, who were held to be responsible for the murder of banker and politician Emanuele Notarbartolo. While investigating over various crimes committed by the cosche of the Conca d'Oro, Sangiorgi realized that the murders were not the result of individual initiatives, but they involved rules, collective decisions and a system of territorial control.

The investigation started in a citrus farm located near the Arenella, called Fondo Laganà, where four decomposing bodies had been discovered in a cave. The investigation then shifted to two very rich and famous Palermitan families, the Florio and the Whitaker. Sangiorgi discovered that the two dynasties lived side by side with the mafiosi of the Conca d'Oro, who were hired as guardians and farmers in their estates and paid to receive "protection"; the mafia, however, often resorted to threats and intimidations to obtain these positions: the Whitaker family in particular had their infant daughter Audrey kidnapped for ransom, and she was returned only after they paid a hefty sum.

Sangiorgi discovered that the bodies hidden in the cave at Fondo Laganà belonged to a group of "picciotti" that Francesco Noto, Mafia boss of the Olivuzza, had inserted in the estate owned by the Florio family as coachmen, but Noto later murdered them after they had turned on him; Noto himself worked in the estate as a gardener while his brother Pietro, the underboss of the family, worked as a guardian. The Florio family never cooperated with the authorities. Their powerful status, after all, allowed them to avoid answering to Sangiorgi's requests for an interrogation or even for a simple declaration.

Sangiorgi's office was on the lookout for people willing to cooperate with the authorities. The occasion finally presented itself in October 1899, when a man previously known to police, Francesco Siino, miraculously survived an attempted murder. Siino was the boss of Malaspina and was considered by Sangiorgi to be the "regional chief" of the mafia. Siino began his testimony by explaining that he was part of a "group of friends", but pressured, was forced to admit specific circumstances. In 1898 his fortunes had been declining: his adversary Antonio Giammona, boss of the Uditore Mafia family, contested his racket of the fruit and vegetable market, robberies, extortion, and banknotes counterfeiting. In 1896 Siino had launched a war against the family of Giammona, but Giammona was winning, and was also the one who ordered the hit on Siino. On the night between 27 and 28 April, Sangiorgi's office arrested several mafiosi, among them Antonio Giammona.

== The report ==
The report minutely describes the business methods used by organized crime such as: committing robberies, infiltrating agricultural estates, counterfeiting banknotes. However, their repressive and violent methods are also described in detail, such as threats and murders committed against witnesses. Sangiorgi furthermore describes how the territory is jointly administered by the Mafia bosses and how they use the funds destined for the families of those incarcerated and to pay the lawyers representing the mafia. Siino revealed that eight different Mafia families were present in the Conca d'Oro:

- Piana dei Colli
- Acquasanta
- Falde
- Malaspina
- Uditore
- Passo di Rigano
- Perpignano
- Olivuzza

The dossier also contained data relative to the presence and distribution of the mafia in the city of Palermo and its outlying towns:

Mafia in the suburbs and rural Mafia: social composition.	Neighborhoods (218 elements)	Province (206 elements)
Landowners	26	23
Supervisors, campieri, wardens, gardeners	45	19
Traffickers, intermediaries	25	15
Priests	-	8
Civilians and council employees	2	8
Artisans, shopkeepers, urban workers in general	46	29
Shepherds, goat farmers, cowherds	19	17
Agricultural technicians	6	2
Agricultural workers	11	5
Farmers	12	44
Bourgeoisie	-	20
Not identified	19	6

== The trial ==
The report was given to the city's prosecutor in preparation of a trial. Sangiorgi's objective had been to obtain evidence to demonstrate that the protection racket, alongside political contacts, were the basis of the Mafia's modus operandi.
A successful conviction would have demonstrated that the Mafia is an organic phenomenon, and thus a unitary one. For this reason, the prosecutors aimed to use a specific law that punished criminal association.

The trial began in May 1901. The previous year, however, Sangiorgi had lost his political backing in Rome: in June 1900 the government of Luigi Pelloux collapsed. Pelloux, a general of the army, knew Sangiorgi personally and he had been the one to promote him to questor of Palermo in 1898.

Aware of the changed political situation, Francesco Siino withdrew all of his confessions. The other witnesses also came in defense of all of the accused, who were described as "true gentlemen". After only a month, the first degree convictions were delivered, and only 32 of the accused were judged guilty of having created a criminal organization. Taking into account the time already spent in prison, most were released after only a day.

Sangiorgi laconically commented on the verdict:

It couldn't have been any other way, if those who sued them in the evening rushed to their defense in the morning.

== Bibliography ==
- Salvatore Lupo, Storia della mafia, Donzelli, 2004.
- John Dickie, Cosa Nostra, Laterza, 2005,
