= Racketeering =

Criminal scheme of recurrent extortion

In the United States, racketeering is a type of organized crime in which the perpetrators set up a coercive, fraudulent, extortionary, or otherwise illegal coordinated scheme or operation (a "racket") to repeatedly or consistently collect a profit. The term "racketeering" was coined by the Employers' Association of Chicago in June 1927 in a statement about the influence of organized crime in the Teamsters' Union. Specifically, a racket was defined by this coinage as being a service that calls forth its own demand, and would not have been needed otherwise. Narrowly, it means coercive or fraudulent business practices; broadly, it can mean any criminal scheme or operation with ongoing or reoccurring profit, as defined in the 1970 U.S. RICO Act, which aimed to curtail the power of the Mafia and other organized crime.

Originally and often still specifically, racketeering may refer to an organized criminal act in which the perpetrators offer a service that will not be put into effect, offer a service to solve a nonexistent problem, or offer a service that solves a problem that would not exist without the racket. However, racketeers may also sometimes offer an ostensibly effectual service outside of the law to solve an actual existing problem. The traditional and historically most common example of a racket is the "protection racket", in which racketeers offer to protect a business from robbery or vandalism; however, the racketeers will themselves coerce or threaten the business into accepting this service, often with the threat (implicit or otherwise) that failure to acquire the offered services will lead to the racketeers themselves contributing to the existing problem. In many cases, the potential problem may be caused by the same party that offers to solve it, but that fact may be concealed, with the intent to engender continual patronage. The protection racket is thus often a method of extortion, at least in practice.

The definition of the term "racket" has been expanded over time and may now be used less strictly to refer to any continuous or repeated illegal organized crime operation, including those that do not necessarily involve fraudulent or coercive practices or extortion. "Racket" may refer to the "numbers racket" or the "drug racket" which do not center on extortion, coercion, fraud, or deception. However, as participants lack legal forms of redress, they are typically vulnerable to protection racketeering.

== RICO Act ==
On October 15, 1970, the Racketeer Influenced and Corrupt Organizations Act (18 U.S.C. §§ 1961–1968), commonly referred to as the "RICO Act", became United States law. The RICO Act allows federal law enforcement to charge a person or group of people with racketeering, defined as committing multiple violations of certain varieties within a ten-year period. The purpose of the RICO Act was stated as "the elimination of the infiltration of organized crime and racketeering into legitimate organizations operating in interstate commerce". S.Rep. No. 617, 91st Cong., 1st Sess. 76 (1968). However, the statute is sufficiently broad to encompass illegal activities relating to any enterprise affecting interstate or foreign commerce.

18 U.S.C. § 1961(10) provides that the Attorney General of the United States may designate any department or agency to conduct investigations authorized by the RICO statute and such department or agency may use the investigative provisions of the statute or the investigative power of such department or agency otherwise conferred by law. Absent a specific designation by the Attorney General, jurisdiction to conduct investigations for violations of 18 U.S.C. § 1962 lies with the agency having jurisdiction over the violations constituting the pattern of racketeering activity listed in 18 U.S.C. § 1961.

To prove a RICO charge, the prosecution must prove that a pattern of racketeering activity occurred within a ten year period. Racketeering activity includes the act or threat of murder, kidnapping, gambling, arson, robbery, bribery, extortion, dealing in a controlled substance, and additional serious crimes punishable by imprisonment for more than 1 year.

In the United States, civil racketeering laws are also used in federal and state courts.

== See also ==
- Addiopizzo
- Confidence trick
- Pizzo (mafia)
