= Sicilian Mafia =

Organized Italian crime syndicate

Cosa Nostra
- Founding location: Sicily, Italy
- Years active: Since the 19th century
- Territory: Territories with established coordination structures with significant territorial control are in Sicily, in particular in the provinces of Palermo, Trapani, Catania, Enna, Caltanissetta, and Agrigento
- Ethnicity: Sicilians
- Membership: 5,500 members
- Criminal activities: Racketeering, extortion, drug trafficking, loan sharking, gambling, kidnapping, white-collar crime, corruption, murder, money laundering agribusiness, agritourism
- Allies: American Mafia, Stidda, 'Ndrangheta, Camorra

The Sicilian Mafia or Cosa Nostra (Italian: [ˈkɔːza ˈnɔstra, ˈkɔːsa -]; Sicilian: [ˈkɔːsa ˈnɔʂː(ɽ)a]; lit. 'Our Thing'), also known as the Mafia, is an Italian secret criminal society and criminal organization originating on the island of Sicily and dating back to the mid-19th century. Emerging as a form of local protection and control over land and agriculture, the Mafia gradually evolved into a powerful criminal network. By the mid-20th century, it had infiltrated politics, construction, and finance, later expanding into drug trafficking, money laundering, and other crimes. At its core, the Mafia engages in protection racketeering, arbitrating disputes between criminals, and organizing and overseeing illegal agreements and transactions.

The basic group is known as a "family", "clan", or cosca. Each family claims sovereignty over a territory, usually a town, village or neighborhood (borgata) of a larger city, in which it operates its rackets. Its members call themselves "men of honour", although the public often refers to them as mafiosi. By the 20th century, wide-scale emigration from Sicily led to the formation of mafiosi-style gangs in other countries, in particular in the United States, where its offshoot, the American Mafia, was created. These diaspora-based outfits replicated the traditions and methods of their Sicilian ancestors to varying extents.

== Etymology ==
The word mafia originated in Sicily. The Sicilian noun mafiusu (in Italian: mafioso) roughly translates to "swagger", but can also be translated as "boldness, bravado". Scholar Diego Gambetta writes, "In reference to a man, mafiusu in nineteenth-century Sicily was ambiguous, signifying a bully, arrogant but also fearless, enterprising and proud." In reference to a woman, however, the feminine form mafiusa means a beautiful or attractive female. The Sicilian word mafie refers to the caves near Trapani and Marsala, which were often used as hiding places for refugees and criminals.

Sicily was once an Islamic emirate, and it has been suggested that the Sicilian word mafia might have Arabic roots. Possible Arabic roots of the word include:

- mahyāṣ (مهياص): aggressive boasting, bragging
- marfūḍ (مرفوض): rejected
- muʿāfā (معافى): safety, protection
- Maʿāfir (معافر): the name of an Arab tribe that ruled Palermo

The public's association of the word with the criminal secret society was perhaps inspired by the 1863 play I mafiusi di la Vicarìa ("The Mafiosi of the Vicaria") by Giuseppe Rizzotto and Gaspare Mosca. The words mafia and mafiusi are never mentioned in the play. The drama is about a Palermo prison gang with traits similar to the Mafia: a boss, an initiation ritual, and talk of umirtà (omertà or code of silence) and pizzu (a codeword for extortion money). The play had great success throughout Italy. Soon after, the use of the term mafia began appearing in the Italian state's early reports on the group. The word was first documented in 1865 in a report by police prefect Filippo Antonio Gualterio.

The term mafia has become a generic term for any organized criminal network with similar structure, methods, and interests. But Giovanni Falcone, an Italian judge who was murdered by the Mafia in 1992, had objected to the conflation of the term "Mafia" with organized crime in general:

While there was a time when people were reluctant to pronounce the word "Mafia" ... nowadays people have gone so far in the opposite direction that it has become an overused term ... I am no longer willing to accept the habit of speaking of the Mafia in descriptive and all-inclusive terms that make it possible to stack up phenomena that are indeed related to the field of organised crime but that have little or nothing in common with the Mafia.

— Giovanni Falcone, 1990

According to Mafia turncoats (pentiti), the real name of the Mafia is "Cosa Nostra" ("Our Thing"). Italian American mafioso Joseph Valachi testified before the Permanent Subcommittee on Investigations of the U.S. Senate Committee on Government Operations in 1963 (at what are known as the Valachi hearings). He revealed that American mafiosi referred to their organization by the term cosa nostra ("our thing" or "this thing of ours" or simply "our cause" / "our interest"). At the time, Cosa Nostra was understood as a proper name, fostered by the FBI and disseminated by the media. The FBI added the article la to the term, calling it La Cosa Nostra (in Italy, the article la is not used when referring to Cosa Nostra).

In 1984, Mafia turncoat Tommaso Buscetta revealed to anti-mafia Italian magistrate Giovanni Falcone that the term was used by the Sicilian Mafia, as well. Buscetta dismissed the word mafia as a mere literary creation. Other defectors, such as Antonino Calderone and Salvatore Contorno, confirmed the use of Cosa Nostra by members. Mafiosi introduce known members to each other as belonging to cosa nostra ("our thing") or la stessa cosa ("the same thing"), meaning "he is the same thing as you – a mafioso."

The Sicilian Mafia has used other names to describe itself throughout its history, such as "The Honored Society" (Onorata Società) or "Brotherhood" (Fratellanza). Mafiosi are known among themselves as "men of honor" or "men of respect".

Cosa Nostra should not be confused with other mafia-type organizations in Southern Italy, such as the 'Ndrangheta in Calabria, the Camorra in Campania, or the Sacra Corona Unita and Società foggiana in Apulia.

== Overview ==
In 1876, Leopoldo Franchetti described the Sicilian Mafia as an "industry of violence". In 1993, the Italian sociologist Diego Gambetta described it as a cartel of private protection firms. He further characterized mafiosi as "guarantors of trust", and that Sicilian people tend to be distrustful of each other and therefore routinely seek mafia protection in their business dealings. This is true for other parts of southern Italy, which never experienced the same post-war economic growth that northern and central Italy enjoyed due in part to a lack of cooperation and healthy competition among the locals. The Mafia may provide a sense of security to those who pay it for protection, but the Mafia actually increases the general amount of distrust in Sicilian society. Those who are under mafia protection have an incentive to cheat those who are not under protection. The Mafia fosters crime by making it safer for criminals to engage in illegal dealings with each other (criminals are the Mafia's most important clients because they can't get protection from the legal system). And since mafiosi charge fees for their services, they increase transaction costs, which in turn leads to a higher cost of living for average Sicilians.

The central activity of the Mafia is the arbitration of disputes between criminals and the organization and the enforcement of illicit agreements through the use of violence. The Mafia does not serve the general public as the police do, but only specific clients who pay them for protection.

The mafia's principal activities are settling disputes among other criminals, protecting them against each other's cheating, and organizing and overseeing illicit agreements, often involving many agents, such as illicit cartel agreements in otherwise legal industries.

— Diego Gambetta, Codes of the Underworld (2009)

The Sicilian Mafia is not a centralized organization. It is more of an association of independent gangs who sell their services under a common brand. This cartel claims the exclusive right to sell extralegal protection services within their territories, and by their labels (man of honor, mafioso, etc.), they distinguish themselves from common criminals whom they exclude from the protection market.

Hence the term mafia found a class of violent criminals ready and waiting for a name to define them, and, given their special character and importance in Sicilian society, they had the right to a different name from that defining vulgar criminals in other countries.

— Leopoldo Franchetti, 1876

Franchetti argued that the Mafia would never disappear unless the very structure of the island's social institutions were to undergo a fundamental change. Over a century later, Diego Gambetta concurred with Franchetti's analysis, arguing that the Mafia exists because the government does not provide adequate protection to merchants from property crime, fraud, and breaches of contract. Gambetta wrote that Sicily (in the early 1990s) had "no clear property rights legislation or administrative or financial codes of practice", and that its court system was "appalling" in its inefficiency. Gambetta recommended that the government liberalize the drug market and abolish price-fixing of cigarettes so as to move these commodities out of the black market; to increase transparency in public contracting so that there can be no rigging, which mafiosi usually arbitrate; and redesign the voting process to make it harder to buy votes. Fixing these problems would reduce the demand for mafioso intervention in political and economic affairs.

=== Cultural aspects ===
Until the 1980s, leading social scientists like Henner Hess and Anton Blok, who conducted the first field studies on the phenomenon between the 1960s and the early 1980s, saw the Mafia as merely a form of behaviour and power, downplaying its organisational aspects. Their thinking was shaped by sicilianismo, a late 19th-century movement opposed to the indiscriminate criminalization of all Sicilians by Italian law enforcement and public opinion, promoted in particular by the Sicilian ethnographer Giuseppe Pitrè. According to the sicilianisti, the term 'mafia' simply embodied an attitude, a mentality deeply rooted in the island's popular culture; an expression of the local traditional society's fundamental rejection of the foreign invaders who had ruled Sicily for centuries. "Mafia" was a "way of being", according to a definition by Pitrè:

Mafia is the consciousness of one's own worth, the exaggerated concept of individual force as the sole arbiter of every conflict, of every clash of interests or ideas.

— Giuseppe Pitrè, 1889

Other scholars such as Gaetano Mosca say:

...with the word Mafia, the Sicilians intend to express two things, two social phenomena, that can be analyzed in separate ways even though they are closely related. The Mafia, or rather the essence of the Mafia, is a way of thinking that requires a certain line of conduct such as maintaining one's pride or even bullying in a given situation. On the other hand, the same word in Sicily can also indicate, not a special organization, but the combination of many small organizations, that pursue various goals, in the course of which its members almost always do things that are basically illegal and sometimes even criminal.

— Gaetano Mosca, 1901

Like Pitrè, some scholars viewed mafiosi as individuals behaving according to specific subcultural codes, but did not consider the Mafia a formal organisation. Judicial investigations by Falcone and scientific research in the 1980s provided solid proof of the existence of well-structured Mafia groups with entrepreneurial characteristics. Pino Arlacchi, in his seminal 1983 study La mafia imprenditrice (Mafia Business), summarised the dominant way of looking at the mafia up to that point by writing, "Social research into the question of the mafia has probably now reached the point where we can say that the mafia, as the term is commonly understood, does not exist". Arlacchi contested that view, and stressed the economical aspects of the Mafia as a criminal organization. The Mafia was seen as an enterprise, and its economic activities became the focus of academic analyses.

However, by ignoring the cultural aspects, according to historian Salvatore Lupo, the Mafia is often erroneously seen as similar to other non-Sicilian organized criminal associations. These two paradigms missed essential aspects of the Mafia that became clear when investigators were confronted with the testimonies of Mafia turncoats, like those of Buscetta to Judge Falcone at the Maxi Trial. The economic approach to explain the Mafia did illustrate the development and operations of the Mafia business, but neglected the cultural symbols and codes by which the Mafia legitimized its existence and by which it rooted itself into Sicilian society.

According to Lupo, there are several lines of interpretation, often blended to some extent, to define the Mafia: it has been viewed as a mirror of traditional Sicilian society; as an enterprise or type of criminal industry; as a more or less centralized secret society; and as a juridical ordering that is parallel to that of the state – a kind of anti-state. The Mafia is all of these but none of these exclusively.

== Mafia-type organizations under Italian law ==
Introduced in 1982 by Pio La Torre, article 416-bis of the Italian Penal Code defines a Mafia-type association (associazione di tipo mafioso) as one where "those belonging to the association exploit the potential for intimidation which their membership gives them, and the compliance and omertà which membership entails and which lead to the committing of crimes, the direct or indirect assumption of management or control of financial activities, concessions, permissions, enterprises and public services for the purpose of deriving profit or wrongful advantages for themselves or others".

== History ==
Historian John Dickie stated that the genesis of Cosa Nostra is hard to trace because mafiosi are very secretive and do not keep historical records of their own. He added that they have been known to spread deliberate lies about their past and sometimes to believe in their own myths.

=== Post-feudal Sicily ===
The Mafia's genesis began in the 19th century as the product of Sicily's transition from feudalism to capitalism as well as its unification with mainland Italy. Under feudalism, the nobility owned most of the land and enforced the law through their private armies and manorial courts. After 1812, the feudal barons steadily sold off or rented their lands to private citizens. Primogeniture was abolished, land could no longer be seized to settle debts, and one fifth of the land became private property of the peasants. After Italy annexed Sicily in 1860, it redistributed a large share of public and church land to private citizens. The result was a huge increase in the number of landowners – from 2,000 in 1812 to 20,000 by 1861.

With this increase in property owners and commerce came more disputes that needed settling, contracts that needed enforcing, transactions that needed oversight, and properties that needed protecting. The barons released their private armies to let the state take over the job of enforcing the law, but the new authorities were not up to the task, largely due to clashes between official law and local customs. Lack of manpower was also a problem; there were often fewer than 350 active policemen for the entire island. Some towns did not have any permanent police force, and were only visited every few months by some troops to collect malcontents, leaving criminals to operate with impunity in the interim. Compounding these problems was banditry. Rising food prices, the loss of public and church lands, and the loss of feudal commons pushed many desperate peasants to steal. In the face of rising crime, booming commerce, and unreliable law enforcement, property owners and merchants turned to extralegal arbitrators and protectors. These extralegal protectors eventually organized themselves into the first Mafia clans.

In countryside towns that lacked formal constabulary, local elites responded to banditry by recruiting young men into "companies-at-arms" to hunt down thieves and negotiate the return of stolen property, in exchange for a pardon for the thieves and a fee from the victims. These companies-at-arms were often made up of former bandits and criminals, usually the most skilled and violent of them. This saved communities the trouble of training their own policemen, but it may have made the companies-at-arms more inclined to collude with their former brethren rather than destroy them. Scholars such as Salvatore Lupo have identified these groups as "proto-Mafia".

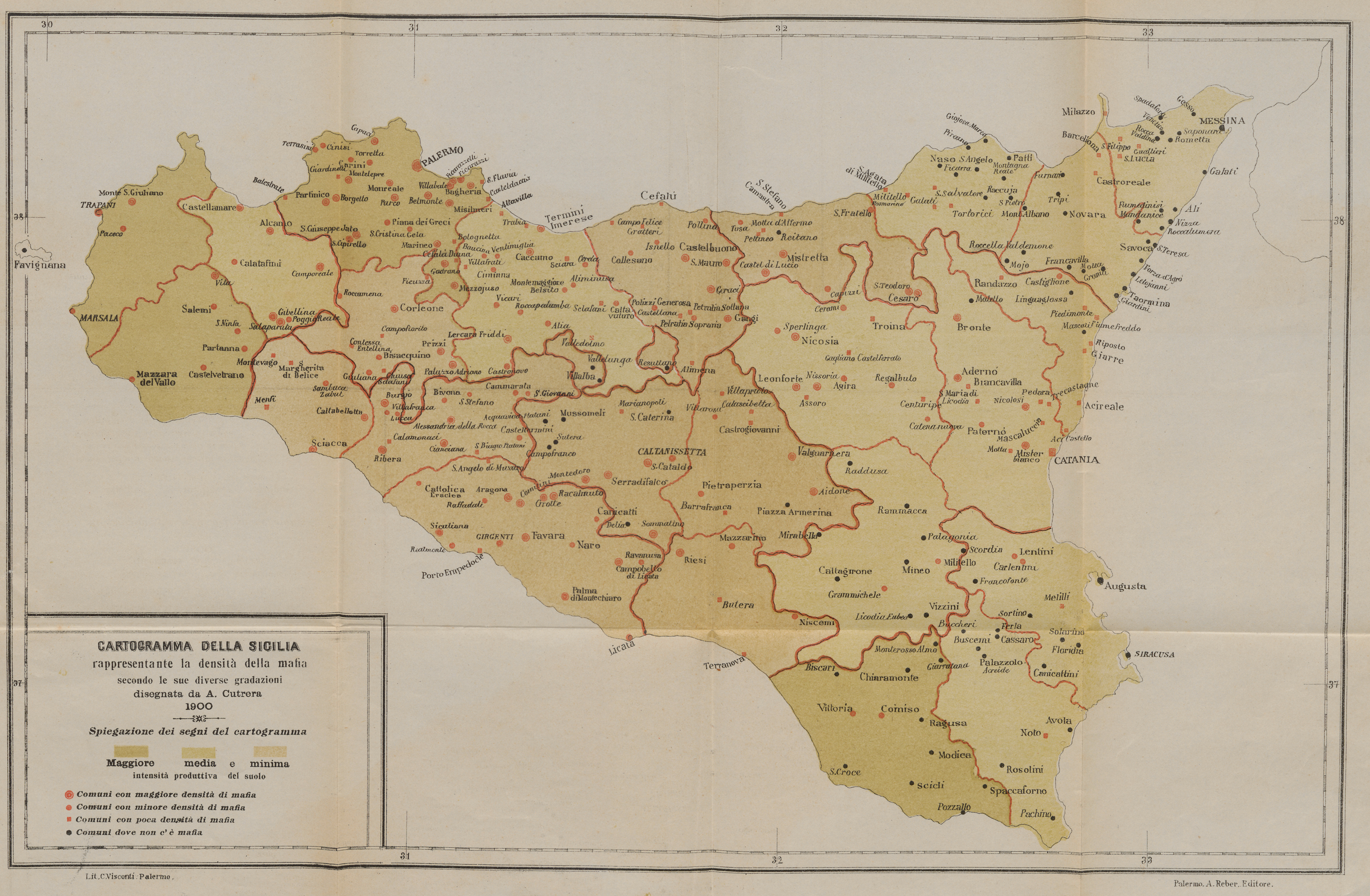
1900 map of Mafia presence in Sicily. Towns with Mafia activity are marked with red dots, while towns marked with black dots indicate the absence of Mafia activity.

The Mafia was a largely western Sicilian phenomenon. There was little Mafia activity in the eastern half of Sicily. This did not mean that there was little violence; the most violent conflicts over land took place in the east, but they did not involve mafiosi. In the east, the ruling elites were more cohesive and active during the transition from feudalism to capitalism. They maintained their large stables of enforcers and were able to absorb or suppress any emerging violent groups. Furthermore, the land in the east was generally divided into a smaller number of large estates so that there were fewer landowners, and their large estates often required its guardians to patrol it full-time. The owners of such estates needed to hire full-time guardians.

By contrast, in the west, the estates tended to be smaller and thus did not require the total, round-the-clock attention of a guardian. It was cheaper for these estates to contract their protection to a mafioso rather than employing full-time guards. A mafioso in these regions could protect multiple small estates at once, which gave him great independence and leverage to charge high prices. The landowners in this region were also frequently absent due to business and social affairs and could not watch over their properties should the protector withdraw, further increasing his bargaining power.

The early Mafia was deeply involved with citrus growers and cattle ranchers, as these industries were particularly vulnerable to thieves and vandals and thus badly needed protection. Citrus plantations had a fragile production system that made them quite vulnerable to sabotage. Likewise, cattle are very easy to steal. The Mafia was often more effective than the police at recovering stolen cattle; in the 1920s, it was noted that the Mafia's success rate at recovering stolen cattle was 95%, whereas the police managed only 10%.

In 1864, Niccolò Turrisi Colonna, leader of the Palermo National Guard, wrote of a "sect of thieves" that operated throughout Sicily. This "sect" was mostly rural, composed of cattle thieves, smugglers, wealthy farmers, and their guards. The sect made "affiliates every day of the brightest young people coming from the rural class, of the guardians of the fields in the Palermitan countryside, and of the large number of smugglers; a sect which gives and receives protection to and from certain men who make a living on traffic and internal commerce. It is a sect with little or no fear of public bodies, because its members believe that they can easily elude this." It had special signals for members to recognize each other, offered protection services, scorned the law, and had a code of loyalty and non-interaction with the police known as umirtà ("code of silence"). Colonna warned in his report that the Italian government's brutal and clumsy attempts to crush crime only made the problem worse by alienating the populace. An 1865 dispatch from the prefect of Palermo to Rome first officially described the phenomenon as a "Mafia". An 1876 police report provides the earliest known description of the familiar initiation ritual.

Mafiosi meddled in politics early on, bullying voters into voting for candidates they favored. At this period in history, only a small fraction of the Sicilian population could vote, so a single mafia boss could control a sizable chunk of the electorate and thus wield considerable political leverage. Mafiosi used their allies in government to avoid prosecution as well as persecute less well-connected rivals. Given the highly fragmented and shaky Italian political system, cliques of Mafia-friendly politicians exerted a strong influence.

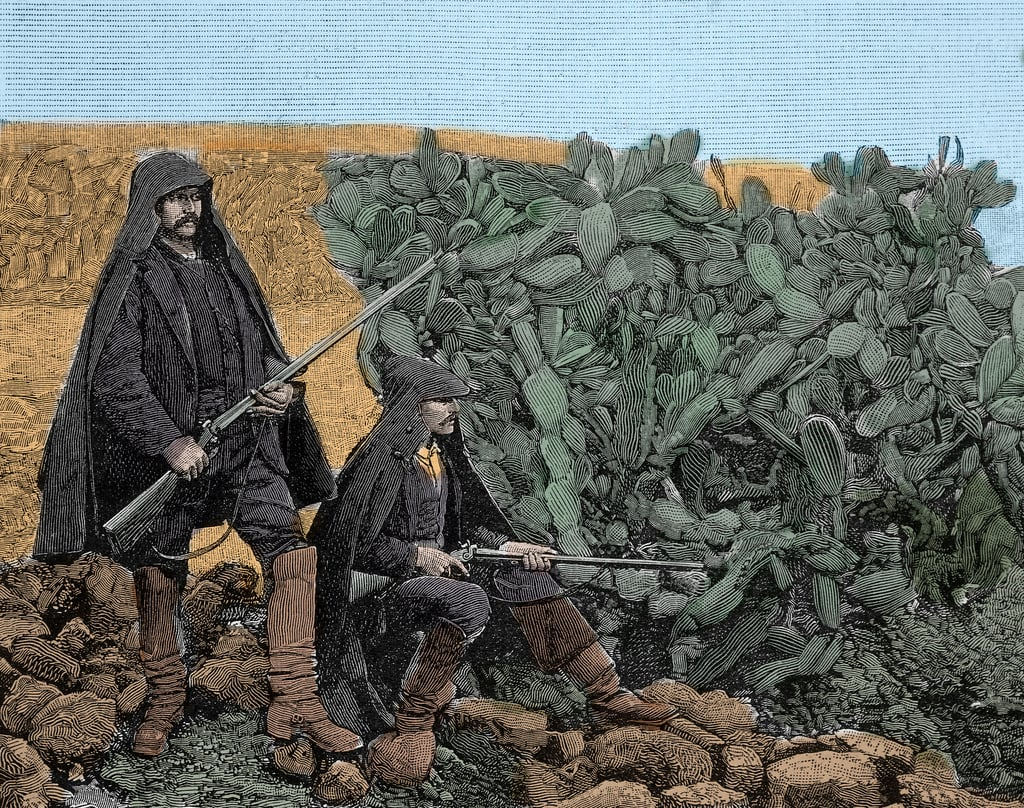
Representation of two brigand members of Cosa Nostra towards the end of the 19th century

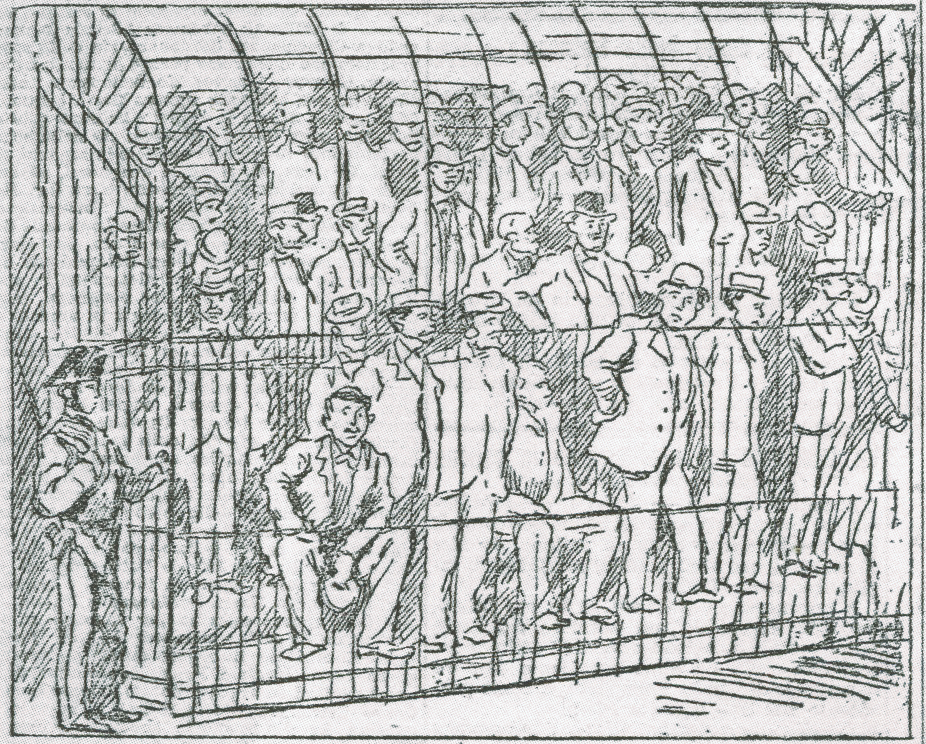
Sketch of the 1901 trial of suspected mafiosi in Palermo. From the newspaper L'Ora, May 1901.

In a series of reports between 1898 and 1900, Ermanno Sangiorgi, the police chief of Palermo, identified 670 mafiosi belonging to eight Mafia clans, which went through alternating phases of cooperation and conflict. The report mentioned initiation rituals and codes of conduct, as well as criminal activities that included counterfeiting, kidnappings for ransom, murder, robbery, and witness intimidation. The Mafia also maintained funds to support the families of imprisoned members and pay defense lawyers. In an attempt to annihilate the Mafia, Italian troops arrested 64 people of Palermo in February 1898. The trial began in May 1901, but after one month, only 32 defendants were found guilty of starting a criminal association and, taking into account the time already spent in prison, many were released the next day.

A 2015 study in The Economic Journal attributed the emergence of the Sicilian Mafia to the resource curse. Early Mafia activity was strongly linked to Sicilian municipalities abundant in sulfur, Sicily's most valuable export commodity. The combination of a weak state and a lootable natural resource made the sulfur-rich parts of Sicily vulnerable to the emergence of mafia-type organizations. A valuable natural resource in areas where law enforcement is weak or absent creates a demand for private protection (which mafia-type organizations can supply) and opportunities for extortion (also by mafia-type organizations). A 2017 study in the Journal of Economic History links the emergence of the Sicilian Mafia also to the surging demand for oranges and lemons following the late 18th-century discovery that citrus fruits cured scurvy. A 2019 study in the Review of Economic Studies linked Mafia activity to "the rise of socialist Peasant Fasci organizations. In an environment with weak state presence, this socialist threat triggered landowners, estate managers, and local politicians to turn to the Mafia to resist and combat peasant demands."

=== Fascist suppression ===
In 1925, Benito Mussolini initiated a campaign to destroy the Mafia and assert Fascist control over Sicilian life. The Mafia threatened and undermined his power in Sicily, and a successful campaign would strengthen him as the new leader, legitimizing and empowering his rule. He believed that such suppression would be a great propaganda coup for fascism, and it would also provide an excuse to suppress his political opponents on the island since many Sicilian politicians had Mafia links.

As prime minister, Mussolini visited Sicily in May 1924 and passed through Piana dei Greci, where he was received by mayor/Mafia boss Francesco Cuccia. At some point, Cuccia expressed surprise at Mussolini's police escort and whispered in his ear: "You are with me, you are under my protection. What do you need all these cops for?" After Mussolini rejected Cuccia's offer of protection, the sindaco felt that he had been slighted and instructed the townsfolk not to attend the duce's speech. Mussolini felt humiliated and outraged.

Cuccia's careless remark has passed into history as the catalyst for Mussolini's war on the Mafia. Mussolini firmly established his power in January 1925; he appointed Cesare Mori as the Prefect of Palermo in October 1925 and granted him special powers to fight the Mafia. Mori formed a small army of policemen, carabinieri and militiamen, which went from town to town rounding up suspects. To force suspects to surrender, they would take their families hostage, sell off their property, or publicly slaughter their livestock. By 1928, more than 11,000 suspects were arrested. Confessions were sometimes extracted through beatings and torture. Some mafiosi who had been on the losing end of Mafia feuds voluntarily cooperated with prosecutors, perhaps as a way of obtaining protection and revenge. Charges of Mafia association were typically leveled at poor peasants and gabellotti (farm leaseholders), but were avoided when dealing with major landowners. Many were tried en masse. More than 1,200 were convicted and imprisoned, and many others were internally exiled without trial.

Mori's campaign ended in June 1929 when Mussolini recalled him to Rome. He did not permanently crush the Mafia as the Fascist press proclaimed, but his campaign was very successful at suppressing it.

There was nearly no mafia left after the war. The Sicilian families had been shut down by the prefect Mori.

— Antonino Calderone

Sicily's murder rate sharply declined. Landowners were able to raise the legal rents on their lands, sometimes as much as ten-thousandfold.

A second government campaign against the Mafia occurred from 1933 to 1939; however, since the regime had already declared that the Mafia phenomenon had been completely eliminated (Mussolini had ordered that the word mafia no longer be used in public discourse), the second campaign was not publicised like the first one. The second campaign was carried out through the Police Inspectorate for Sicily (Ispettorato generale di pubblica sicurezza per la Sicilia), headed by Giuseppe Gueli, who had served under Mori. Gueli reported to Mussolini's chief of police Arturo Bocchini that Mafia groups had not been eliminated and had actually rapidly reorganised after the first anti-Mafia campaign. The second campaign made use of a large network of informers and, most likely, torture. It also produced extensive documentation of the Mafia's internal organisation.

=== Post-Fascist revival ===
In 1943, nearly half a million Allied troops invaded Sicily. Crime soared in the upheaval and chaos. Many inmates escaped from prisons, banditry returned, and the black market thrived. During the first six months of Allied occupation, party politics were banned in Sicily. Most institutions were destroyed, with the exception of the police and carabinieri, and the American occupiers had to build a new order from scratch. As Fascist mayors were deposed, the Allied Military Government of Occupied Territories (AMGOT) simply appointed replacements. Many turned out to be mafiosi, such as Calogero Vizzini and Giuseppe Genco Russo. They could easily present themselves as political dissidents, and their anti-communist position gave them additional credibility. Mafia bosses reformed their clans, absorbing some of the marauding bandits into their ranks.

The changing economic landscape of Sicily shifted the Mafia's power base from rural to urban areas. The Minister of Agriculture – a communist – pushed for reforms in which peasants were to get larger shares of produce, be allowed to form cooperatives and take over badly used land, and remove the system by which leaseholders (known as "gabellotti") could rent land from landowners for their own short-term use. Owners of especially large estates were to be forced to sell off some of their land. The Mafia had connections to many landowners and murdered many socialist reformers. The most notorious attack was the Portella della Ginestra massacre, when 11 people were killed and 33 wounded during May Day celebrations on May 1, 1947. The bloodbath was perpetrated by bandit Salvatore Giuliano, who was possibly backed by local Mafia bosses. In the end, though, they were unable to stop the process, and many landowners chose to sell their land to mafiosi, who offered more money than the government.

In the 1950s, a crackdown in the United States on drug trafficking led to the imprisonment of many American mafiosi. Cuba, a major hub for drug smuggling, was taken over by Fidel Castro and associated communists. In 1957 American mafia boss Joseph Bonanno returned to Sicily to franchise his heroin operations to the Sicilian clans. Anticipating rivalries for the lucrative American drug market, he negotiated the establishment of a Sicilian Mafia Commission to mediate disputes.

=== Sack of Palermo ===
The post-war period saw a huge building boom in Palermo. Allied bombing in World War II had left more than 14,000 people homeless, and migrants were pouring in from the countryside, so there was a huge demand for new homes. Much of this construction was subsidized by public money. In 1956, two Mafia-connected officials, Vito Ciancimino and Salvatore Lima, took control of Palermo's Office of Public Works. Between 1959 and 1963, about 80 percent of building permits were given to just five people, none of whom represented major construction firms; they were likely Mafia frontmen. Construction companies unconnected with the Mafia were forced to pay protection money. Many buildings were illegally constructed before the city's planning was finalized. Mafiosi scared off anyone who dared to question the illegal building. The result of this unregulated building was the demolition of many historic buildings and the erection of apartment blocks, many of which were not up to standard.

Mafia organizations entirely control the building sector in Palermo – the quarries where aggregates are mined, site clearance firms, cement plants, metal depots for the construction industry, wholesalers for sanitary fixtures, and so on.

— Giovanni Falcone, 1982

During the 1950s, the Mafia continued its deep penetration of the construction and cement industries. The cement business was appealing because it allows high levels of local economic involvement and is a good front for illegitimate operations.

=== First Mafia War ===
The First Mafia War was the first high-profile conflict between Mafia clans in post-war Italy (the Sicilian Mafia has a long history of violent rivalries).

In 1962, mafia boss Cesare Manzella organized a drug shipment to the United States with the help of two Sicilian clans, the Grecos and the La Barberas. Manzella entrusted another boss, Calcedonio Di Pisa, to handle the heroin. When the shipment arrived in the United States, however, the American buyers claimed that some heroin was missing, and paid Di Pisa a commensurately lower sum. Di Pisa accused the Americans of defrauding him, while the La Barberas accused Di Pisa of embezzling the missing heroin. The Sicilian Mafia Commission sided with Di Pisa, and the La Barberas were outraged. The La Barberas murdered Di Pisa and Manzella, triggering a war.

Many non-mafiosi were killed in the crossfire. In April 1963, several bystanders were wounded during a shootout in Palermo. In May, Angelo La Barbera survived a murder attempt in Milan. In June, six military officers and a policeman in Ciaculli were killed while trying to dispose of a car bomb. These incidents provoked national outrage and a crackdown in which nearly 2,000 arrests were made. Mafia activity fell as clans disbanded and mafiosi went into hiding. The Sicilian Mafia Commission was dissolved; it did not re-form until 1969. A total of 117 suspects were tried in 1968, but most were acquitted or received light sentences. The inactivity, plus money lost to legal fees and so forth, reduced most mafiosi to poverty. The Mafia families in Palermo were particularly hit hard, and ceased activity altogether in that city for a few years until the conclusion of the trials in 1968 allowed them to reorganize.

=== Smuggling boom ===
The 1950s and 1960s were difficult times for the mafia, but in the 1970s their rackets grew considerably more lucrative, particularly smuggling. The most lucrative racket of the 1970s was cigarette smuggling. Sicilian and Neapolitan crime bosses negotiated a joint monopoly over the smuggling of cigarettes to Naples.

Heroin refineries operated by Corsican gangsters in Marseilles were shut down by French authorities, and morphine traffickers looked to Sicily. Starting in 1975, Cosa Nostra set up heroin refineries around the island. Cosa Nostra sought to control both the refining and distribution of heroin. Sicilian mafiosi moved to the United States to personally control distribution networks there, often at the expense of their U.S. counterparts. Heroin addiction in North America surged from the mid-1970s into the early 1980s. By 1982, the Sicilian Mafia controlled about 80 percent of the heroin trade in the northeastern United States. Heroin was often distributed to street dealers from Mafia-owned pizzerias, and the revenues could be passed off as restaurant profits (the so-called Pizza Connection).

=== Second Mafia War ===
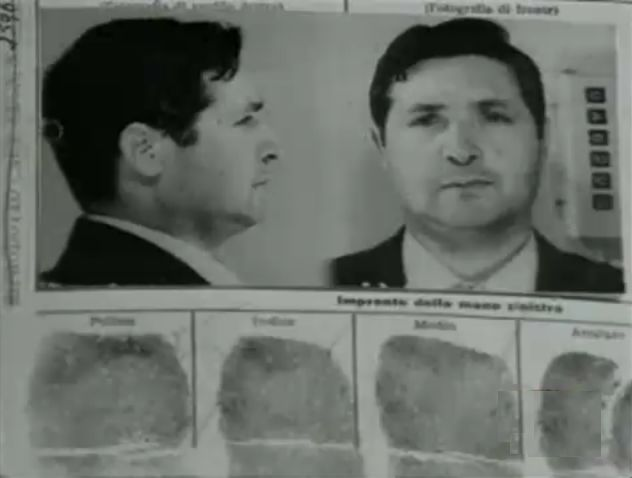
Salvatore Riina

In the early 1970s, Luciano Leggio was boss of the Corleonesi clan and a member of the Sicilian Mafia Commission, and he forged a coalition of mafia clans known as the Corleonesi with himself as its leader. He initiated a campaign to dominate Cosa Nostra and its narcotics trade. Leggio was imprisoned in 1974, so he acted through his deputy Salvatore Riina, to whom he eventually handed over control. The Corleonesi bribed cash-strapped Palermo clans into the fold, subverted members of other clans, and secretly recruited new members. In 1977, the Corleonesi had Gaetano Badalamenti expelled from the commission on trumped-up charges of hiding drug revenues. In April 1981, the Corleonesi murdered a rival member of the Commission Stefano Bontade, and the Second Mafia War began in earnest. Hundreds of enemy mafiosi and their relatives were murdered, sometimes by traitors in their own clans. By manipulating the Mafia's rules and eliminating rivals, the Corleonesi came to completely dominate the commission. Riina used his power over the commission to replace the bosses of certain clans with hand-picked regents. In the end, the Corleonesi faction won and Riina effectively became the "boss of bosses" of the Sicilian Mafia.

At the same time that the Corleonesi waged their campaign to dominate Cosa Nostra, they also waged a campaign of murder against journalists, officials, and policemen who dared to cross them. The police were frustrated with the lack of help that they were receiving from witnesses and politicians. At the funeral of a policeman murdered by mafiosi in 1985, policemen insulted and spat at two attending politicians, and a fight broke out between them and military police.

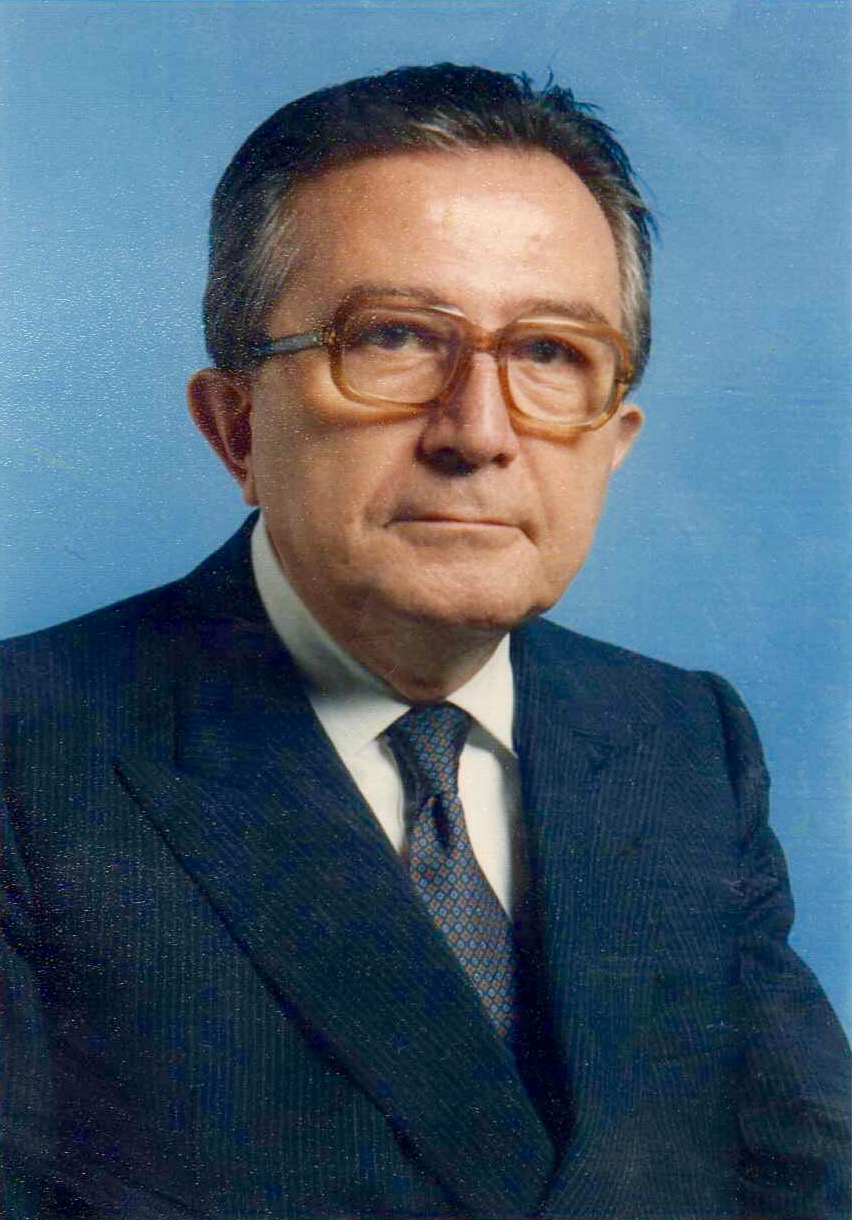
Giulio Andreotti, seven-time Prime Minister of Italy, had proven links to the Mafia.

Prime Minister Giulio Andreotti and High Court judge Corrado Carnevale were long been suspected of having ties to the Mafia, in addition to the Sicilian politician Salvatore Lima. In 1999, the Italian court of appeal held that Andreotti "had, not without personal advantages, knowingly and deliberately nurtured a stable relationship with the criminal organization, contributing to its strength by manifesting his availability to favor its members"; however, the court did not convict Andreotti due to the statute of limitations, which had been reached at the time of the ruling.

=== Maxi Trial ===
Buscetta (in sunglasses) is led into court at the Maxi Trial, circa 1986.

In the early 1980s, magistrates Giovanni Falcone and Paolo Borsellino began a campaign against Cosa Nostra. Their big break came with the arrest of Tommaso Buscetta, a mafioso who chose to turn informant in exchange for protection from the Corleonesi, who had already murdered many of his friends and relatives. Other mafiosi followed his example. Falcone and Borsellino compiled their testimonies and organized the Maxi Trial, which lasted from February 1986 to December 1987. It was held in a bunker-courthouse specially built for the occasion, where 475 mafiosi were put on trial, of which, 338 were convicted. In January 1992, Italy's Supreme Court of Cassation confirmed these convictions. It is considered to be the most significant trial ever against the Sicilian Mafia, as well as the biggest trial in world history.

=== War against the state and Riina's downfall ===
The Mafia retaliated violently. In 1988, they murdered a Palermo judge and his son; three years later, a prosecutor and an anti-mafia businessman were also murdered. Salvatore Lima, a close political ally of the Mafia, was murdered for failing to reverse the convictions as promised. Falcone was killed on May 23, 1992, with 400 kg (880 lb) of TNT positioned under the highway near Capaci, Sicily. Borsellino was also killed by a car bomb on July 19, 1992. This led to a public outcry and a massive government crackdown, resulting in the arrest of Salvatore Riina in January 1993. More and more informants emerged. Many paid a high price for their cooperation, usually through the murder of relatives. For example, Francesco Marino Mannoia's mother, aunt, and sister were murdered.

After Riina's capture, numerous terror attacks were ordered as a warning to its members to not turn state's witness, but also in response to the overruling of the Article 41-bis prison regime. Tourist spots were attacked, such as the Via dei Georgofili in Florence, Via Palestro in Milan, and the Piazza San Giovanni in Laterano and Via San Teodoro in Rome, leaving 10 dead and 93 injured and causing severe damage to cultural heritage such as the Uffizi Gallery. The Catholic Church openly condemned the Mafia, two churches were bombed and an anti-Mafia priest was shot dead in Rome.

The choice to hit cultural and church targets was partly to destabilize the government, but also because the Mafia felt that the Roman Catholic Church had abrogated an unwritten hands-off policy toward traditional organized crime in Southern Italy.

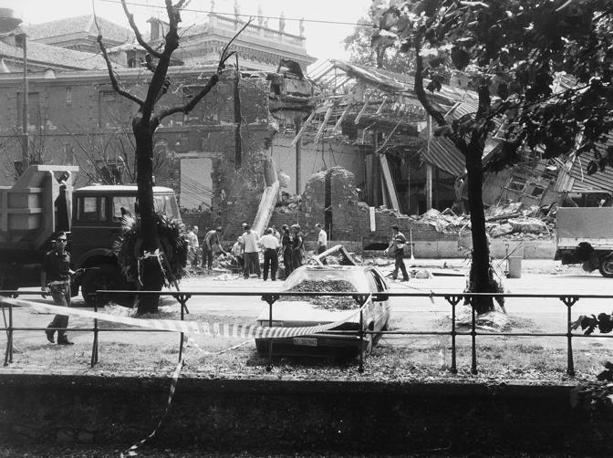
Via Palestro massacre in Milan in 1993

After Riina's capture, the leadership of the Mafia was briefly held by Leoluca Bagarella, then passed to Bernardo Provenzano when Bagarella was captured in 1995. Provenzano halted the campaign of violence and replaced it with a campaign of quietness known as Pax Mafiosa.

=== Provenzano years ===
Under Bernardo Provenzano's leadership, murders of state officials were halted. He also halted the policy of murdering informants and their families, with a view instead to getting them to retract their testimonies and return to the fold. He also restored the common support fund for imprisoned mafiosi.

By the late 1990s, the weakened Cosa Nostra had to yield most of the illegal drug trade to the 'Ndrangheta crime organization from Calabria. In 2006, the 'Ndrangheta was estimated to control 80 percent of the cocaine imported to Europe.

The tide of defectors was greatly stemmed. The Mafia preferred to initiate relatives of existing mafiosi, believing them to be less prone to defection. Provenzano was arrested in 2006, after 43 years on the run. His successor as boss was Matteo Messina Denaro, who was arrested only in 2023.

=== Modern Mafia in Italy ===
The incarcerated bosses are subject to strict controls on their contact with the outside world, limiting their ability to run their operations from behind bars under the article 41-bis prison regime. Antonino Giuffrè is a close confidant of Provenzano who turned informant shortly after his capture in 2002. He alleges that Cosa Nostra had direct contact in 1993 with representatives of Silvio Berlusconi who was then planning the birth of Forza Italia.

The alleged deal included a repeal of 41-bis, among other anti-Mafia laws, in return for electoral support in Sicily. Nevertheless, Giuffrè's declarations have not yet been confirmed. The Italian Parliament reinforced the provisions of the 41-bis, with the full support of Forza Italia. When the bill was set to expire in 2002, it was made into a permanent fixture in the penal code and extended to other crimes such as terrorism. However, according to one of Italy's leading magazines L'Espresso, 119 mafiosi have been released on an individual basis – one-fifth of those incarcerated under the 41-bis regime. The human rights group Amnesty International expressed concern that the 41-bis regime could, in some circumstances, amount to "cruel, inhumane or degrading treatment" for prisoners.

In 2015, the Mafia Capitale investigation revealed that the Mafia profits from the European migrant crisis and exploits refugees.

In October 2017, members of the Renzvillo crime family and 2 Carabinieri military police officers were arrested for involvement in the drug trade and large-scale extortion. Altogether 37 people were arrested and over 600 officers were deployed. €11 million ($12 million) in real estate and goods were seized by police. A business owner was forced to pay €180,000 ($212,000). The Renzvillo mafia family has allegedly set up alliances with the 'Ndrangheta and Camorra. The leader is suspected of previously sending members of his organization to Karlsruhe and Cologne in Germany.

On 22 January 2018, 58 people connected to 16 mafia families were arrested by Carabinieri police in Caltanissetta, Palermo, Enna, Ragusa, Agrigento and Catania. Some of the most common charges were mafia association, drug trafficking, extortion, fraud, and vote buying. The mayor of San Biagio Platani, Santino Sabella, was among the arrested and accused of agreeing on candidates for the 2014 local elections with the Sicilian Mafia and exerting pressure on the allocation of council contracts. Two companies running migrant reception centers in Sicily were targeted as protection rackets, overall 27 businesses were targeted and extorted.

On 1 February 2018, 31 people with ties to a crime family based in Palermo were arrested and charged with money laundering, fraud and drug trafficking, as part of Operation "Game Over". Benedetto Bacchi, reportedly controlled over 700 betting shops across Italy and was earning roughly €1 million per month, using an online gambling operator licensed in Malta; his license was suspended. According to investigators, Bacchi bought a construction company, and a villa formerly owned by footballer Giovanni Tedesco for €500,000; the next day Bacchi listed the house for sale at the price of €1.3 million. He also allegedly considered taking over a news publication with his criminal proceeds. Investigators also alleged that the American Mafia in New York had set up a profitable food export company with the Sicilian mafia.

The Cosa Nostra has traditionally been the most powerful group in Palermo. After the arrest of the alleged new mafia boss in July 2019, a CNN article in July 2019 indicated that Sicilian Mafia activity in Palermo was particularly notorious in one area: the Sicilian town of Passo di Rigano with involvement "in business such as wholesale food supplies, online betting and gambling". News articles also confirmed links between the Cosa Nostra and New York's Gambino crime family. According to Italian newspaper La Repubblica, "Off they go, through the streets of Passo di Rigano, Boccadifalco, Torretta and at the same time, Brooklyn, Staten Island, New Jersey. Because from Sicily to the US, the old mafia has returned."

Murders, particularly ones connected to Mafia activity, have decreased considerably since the 1990s. In 1991, there were 481 murders in Sicily of which 253 were connected to Mafia activity. In 2020, there were only 33 murders of which 4 were Mafia murders.

== Structure and composition ==
Cosa Nostra is not a centralized organization but rather a loose confederation of about one hundred groups known alternately as "families", "cosche", "borgatas", or "clans" (despite the name, their members are generally not related by blood). Each of these claims sovereignty over a territory, usually a town or village or a neighborhood of a larger city, though without ever fully conquering and legitimizing its monopoly on violence. For many years, the power apparatuses of the single families were the sole ruling bodies within the two associations, and they have remained the real centers of power even after superordinate bodies were created in the Cosa Nostra beginning in the late 1950s (the Sicilian Mafia Commission).

=== Clan hierarchy ===
Hierarchy of a Cosa Nostra clan

In 1984, mafioso informant Tommaso Buscetta explained to prosecutors the command structure of a typical clan. A clan is led by a "boss" (capofamiglia or rappresentante) who is aided by an underboss (capo bastone or sotto capo) and supervised by one or more advisers (consigliere). Under his command are groups (decina) of about ten "soldiers" (soldati, operai, or picciotti). Each decina is led by a capodecina.

The actual structure of any given clan can vary. Despite the name decina, they do not necessarily have ten soldiers, but can have anything from five to thirty. Some clans are so small that they don't even have decinas and capodecinas, and even in large clans, certain soldiers may report directly to the boss or underboss.

The boss of a clan is typically elected by the rank-and-file soldiers (though violent successions do happen). Due to the small size of most Sicilian clans, the boss of a clan has intimate contact with all members and doesn't receive much in the way of privileges or rewards as he would in larger organizations (such as the larger Five Families of New York). His tenure is also frequently short: elections are yearly, and he might be deposed sooner for misconduct or incompetence.

The underboss is second in command to the boss. The underboss is sometimes a family member, such as a son, who will take over the family if the boss is sick, killed, or imprisoned.

The consigliere ("counselor") of the clan is also elected on a yearly basis. One of his jobs is to supervise the actions of the boss and his immediate underlings, particularly in financial matters (e.g. preventing embezzlement). He also serves as an impartial adviser to the boss and mediator in internal disputes. To fulfill this role, the consigliere must be impartial, devoid of conflict of interest and ambition.

Other than its members, Cosa Nostra makes extensive use of "associates". These are people who work for or aid a clan (or even multiple clans) but are not treated as true members. These include corrupt officials and prospective mafiosi. An associate is considered by the mafiosi nothing more than a tool, someone that they can "use", or "nothing mixed with nil".

The media has often made reference to a capo di tutti capi or "boss of bosses" that allegedly "commands all of Cosa Nostra". Calogero Vizzini, Salvatore Riina, and Bernardo Provenzano were especially influential bosses who have each been described by the media and law enforcement as being the "boss of bosses" of their times. While a powerful boss may exert great influence over his neighbors, the position does not formally exist, according to Mafia turncoats such as Buscetta. According to Mafia historian Salvatore Lupo "the emphasis of the media on the definition of a "capo di tutti capi" is without any foundation".

=== Membership ===
Membership in Cosa Nostra is open only to Sicilian men. A candidate cannot be a relative of or have any close links with a lawman, such as a police officer or a judge. There is no strict age limit; men as young as sixteen have been initiated. A prospective mafioso is carefully tested for obedience, discretion, courage, ruthlessness, and skill at espionage. He is almost always required to commit murder as his ultimate trial, even if he doesn't plan to be a career assassin. The act of murder is to prove his sincerity (i.e., he is not an undercover policeman) and to bind him into silence (i.e., he cannot break omertà without facing murder charges himself).

To be part of the Mafia is highly desirable for many street criminals in terms of status. Mafiosi receive a great deal of respect, because offending a mafioso is to risk lethal retribution from him or his colleagues. A full member also gains more freedom to participate in certain rackets which the Mafia controls (particularly protection racketeering). Traditionally, only men can become mafiosi, though in recent times there have been reports of women assuming the responsibilities of imprisoned mafiosi relatives.

Clans are also called "families", although their members are usually not related by blood. The Mafia actually has rules designed to prevent nepotism. Membership and rank in the Mafia are not hereditary. Most new bosses are not related to their predecessors. The Commission forbids relatives to hold positions in inter-clan bodies at the same time. That said, mafiosi frequently bring their sons into the trade. They have an easier time entering because the son bears his father's seal of approval and is familiar with the traditions and requirements of Cosa Nostra.

A mafioso's legitimate occupation, if any, generally does not affect his prestige within Cosa Nostra. Historically, most mafiosi were employed in menial jobs, and many bosses did not work at all. Professionals such as lawyers and doctors do exist within the organization, and are employed according to whatever useful skills they have.

=== Commission ===
Since the 1950s, the Mafia has maintained multiple commissions to resolve disputes and promote cooperation among clans. Each province of Sicily has its own Commission. Clans are organized into districts (mandamenti) of three or four geographically adjacent clans. Each district elects a representative (capo mandamento) to sit on its Provincial Commission.

Contrary to popular belief, the commissions do not serve as a centralized government for the Mafia. The power of the commissions is limited and clans are autonomous and independent. Rather, each Commission serves as a representative mechanism for consultation of independent clans who decide by consensus. "Contrary to the wide-spread image presented by the media, these superordinate bodies of coordination cannot be compared with the executive boards of major legal firms. Their power is intentionally limited. And it would be entirely wrong to see in the Cosa Nostra a centrally managed, internationally active Mafia holding company", according to criminologist Letizia Paoli.

A major function of the commission is to regulate the use of violence. For instance, a mafioso who wants to commit a murder in another clan's territory must ask the permission of the local boss; the commission enforces this rule. Any murder of a mafioso or prominent individual (police, lawyers, politicians, journalists, etc.) must be approved by the commission. Such acts can potentially upset other clans and spark a war, so the Commission provides a means by which to obtain their approval.

The commission also deals with matters of succession. When a boss dies or retires, his clan's reputation often crumbles with his departure. This can cause clients to abandon the clan and turn to neighboring clans for protection. These clans would grow greatly in status and power relative to their rivals, potentially destabilizing the region and precipitating war. The Commission may choose to divide up the clan's territory and members among its neighbors. Alternatively, the commission has the power to appoint a regent for the clan until it can elect a new boss.

== Rituals and codes of conduct ==
=== Initiation ceremony ===
One of the first accounts of an initiation ceremony into the Mafia was given by Bernardino Verro, a leader of the Fasci Siciliani, a popular movement of democratic and socialist inspiration that arose in Sicily in the early 1890s. In order to give the movement teeth and to protect himself from harm, Verro became a member of a Mafia group in Corleone, the Fratuzzi (Little Brothers). In a memoir written many years later, he described the initiation ritual which he underwent in the spring of 1893:

[I] was invited to take part in a secret meeting of the Fratuzzi. I entered a mysterious room where there were many men armed with guns sitting around a table. In the center of the table, there was a skull drawn on a piece of paper and a knife. In order to be admitted to the Fratuzzi, [I] had to undergo an initiation consisting of some trials of loyalty and the pricking of the lower lip with the tip of the knife: the blood from the wound soaked the skull.

— Bernardino Verro

After his arrest, mafioso Giovanni Brusca described the ceremony in which he was formally made a full member of Cosa Nostra. In 1976, he was invited to a "banquet" at a country house. He was brought into a room where several mafiosi were sitting around a table upon which sat a pistol, a dagger, and a piece of paper bearing the image of a saint. They questioned his commitment and his feelings regarding criminality and murder (despite his already having a history of such acts). When he affirmed himself, Salvatore Riina, then the most powerful boss of Cosa Nostra, took a needle and pricked Brusca's finger. Brusca smeared his blood on the image of the saint, which he held in his cupped hands as Riina set it alight. As Brusca juggled the burning image in his hands, Riina said to him: "If you betray Cosa Nostra, your flesh will burn like this saint".

The elements of the ceremony have changed little over the Mafia's history. These elements have been the subject of much curiosity and speculation. Sociologist Diego Gambetta points out that the Mafia, being a secretive criminal organization, cannot risk having its recruits sign application forms and written contracts that might be seized by the police. Thus they rely on the old-fashioned ritual ceremony. The elements of the ceremony are made deliberately specific, bizarre, and painful so that the event is both memorable and unambiguous, and the ceremony is witnessed by a number of senior mafiosi. The participants may not even care about what the symbols mean, and they may indeed have no intrinsic meaning. The real point of the ritual is to leave no doubt about the mafioso's new status so that it cannot be denied or revoked on a whim.

=== Introductions ===
There is always a risk that outsiders and undercover policemen might masquerade as a mafioso to infiltrate the organization. To ensure that this does not happen, a mafioso must never introduce himself to another mafioso whom he does not personally know, even if he knows the other through reputation. If he wants to establish a relationship, he must ask a third mafioso whom they both personally know to introduce them to each other in a face-to-face meeting. This intermediary can vouch that neither of the two is an impostor.

This tradition is upheld scrupulously, often to the detriment of efficient operation. For instance, when mafioso Indelicato Amedeo returned to Sicily following his initiation in the United States in the 1950s, he could not announce his membership to his own mafioso father but had to wait for a mafioso from the United States who knew of his induction to come to Sicily and introduce the son to the father.

=== Etiquette ===
Mafiosi of equal status sometimes call each other "compare", while inferiors call their superiors "padrino". "Compare" means "comrade", while Padrino is the Italian term for "godfather".

=== Ten Commandments ===
In November 2007, Sicilian police reported the discovery of a list of "Ten Commandments" in the hideout of mafia boss Salvatore Lo Piccolo, thought to be guidelines on good, respectful, and honorable conduct for a mafioso.

1. No one can present himself directly to another of our friends. There must be a third person to do it.
2. Never look at the wives of friends.
3. Never be seen with cops.
4. Don't go to pubs and clubs.
5. Always being available for Cosa Nostra is a duty – even if your wife is about to give birth.
6. Appointments must absolutely be respected (refers to rank and authority).
7. Wives must be treated with respect.
8. When asked for any information, the answer must be the truth.
9. Money cannot be appropriated if it belongs to others or to other families.
10. People who can't be part of Cosa Nostra: anyone who has a close relative in the police, anyone with a two-timing relative in the family, anyone who behaves badly and doesn't hold to moral values.

Antonino Calderone recounted similar Commandments in his 1987 testimony:

These rules are not to touch the women of other men of honor; not to steal from other men of honor or, in general, from anyone; not to exploit prostitution; not to kill other men of honor unless strictly necessary; to avoid passing information to the police; not to quarrel with other men of honor; to maintain proper behavior; to keep silent about Cosa Nostra around outsiders; to avoid under all circumstances introducing oneself to other men of honor.

=== No documentation of Mafia activities ===
There is a strict prohibition in the Mafia on writing incriminating information down on paper, lest such evidence fall into the hands of the police. In 1969, Michele Cavataio was murdered because he had drawn a map on which he had written the names of all the Palermo mafiosi he knew and marked their territories. He showed this map in meetings with other senior mafiosi to explain how he thought the Palermo families should be reorganized in the wake of a Mafia war. When Cavataio was murdered, his assassins searched his body for the map so that they could destroy it, but they didn't find it.

The prohibition on documenting anything also explains why the Mafia uses a bizarre ritual to initiate new members (see above). Since new members cannot sign membership contracts, the initiation of a new member is instead done in a ceremony with witnesses, and the initiate performs a specific series of bizarre actions so that there is no ambiguity as to what is being granted. Likewise, since mafiosi cannot introduce themselves to each other by presenting membership cards, they must ask a third mafioso who knows them both to introduce them to each other and vouch that they are both members.

=== Omertà ===
Omertà is a code of silence and secrecy that forbids mafiosi to betray their comrades to the authorities. The penalty for transgression is death, and relatives of the turncoat may also be murdered. Mafiosi generally do not associate with police (aside perhaps from corrupting individual officers as necessary). For instance, a mafioso will not call the police when he is a victim of a crime. He is expected to take care of the problem himself. To do otherwise would undermine his reputation as a capable protector of others (see below), and his enemies may see him as weak and vulnerable.

The need for secrecy and inconspicuousness deeply colors the traditions and mannerisms of mafiosi. Mafiosi are discouraged from consuming alcohol or other drugs, as in an inebriated state they are more likely to blurt out sensitive information. They also frequently adopt self-effacing attitudes to strangers so as to avoid unwanted attention. Most Sicilians tend to be very verbose and expressive, whereas mafiosi tend to be more terse and subdued.

To a degree, mafiosi also impose omertà on the general population. Civilians who buy their protection or make other deals are expected to be discreet, on pain of death. Witness intimidation is also common.

== Protection rackets ==
Scholars such as Diego Gambetta and Leopold Franchetti have characterized the Mafia as a "cartel of private protection firms". The primary activity of the Mafia is to provide protection and guarantee trust in areas of the Sicilian economy where the police and courts cannot be relied upon. The Mafia arbitrates disputes between criminals, organizes and oversees illicit business deals, and protects businessmen and criminals from cheats, thieves, and vandals. This aspect of the Mafia is often overlooked in the media because, unlike drug dealing and extortion, it is often not reported to the police.

In one of his books, Gambetta illustrates this concept with the scenario of a butcher who wishes to sell some meat to a supermarket without paying sales tax. Since the transaction is essentially a black market deal, the agents cannot turn to the police or the courts if either of them cheats the other. The seller might supply rotting meat, or the purchaser might refuse to pay. The mistrust and fear of being cheated with no recourse might prevent these two agents from making a profitable transaction. To guarantee each other's honesty, the two parties can ask the local mafia clan to oversee the transaction. In exchange for a commission, the mafioso promises to both the buyer and seller that if either of them tries to cheat the other, the cheater can expect to be assaulted or have his property vandalized. Such is the mafioso's reputation for viciousness, impartiality, and reliability that neither the buyer nor the seller would consider cheating with him overseeing the deal. The transaction thus proceeds smoothly.

The Mafia's protection is not restricted to illegal activities. Shopkeepers often pay the Mafia to protect them from thieves. If a shopkeeper enters into a protection contract with a mafioso, the mafioso will make it publicly known that if any thief were foolish enough to rob his client's shop, he would track down the thief, beat him up, and, if possible, recover the stolen merchandise (mafiosi make it their business to know all the fences in their territory).

It is a misconception that the Mafia extorts clients by only offering "protection" from its own violence. While the Mafia often coerces people into buying protection, it usually provides it. In fact, many clients, particularly criminals, actively seek Mafia protection. This is one of the main reasons why the Mafia has resisted more than a century of government efforts to destroy it: the people who willingly solicit these services protect the Mafia from the authorities. If one is enjoying the benefits of Mafia protection, one does not want the police arresting one's mafioso.

In Sicily, protection money is known as pizzo; the anti-extortion support group Addiopizzo derives its name from this. Mafiosi might sometimes ask for favors instead of money, such as assistance in committing a crime.

The amount of money that the Mafia extorts from firms in Sicily correlates weakly with the revenue of the firm. As a result, smaller firms end up paying a higher share of their profits to the Mafia than larger firms; sometimes as high as 40% of profits for smaller firms and as low as 2% of profits for larger firms. The pizzo is thus a sort of regressive taxation that hurts small businesses more. This presents a barrier to entry for entrepreneurs in Sicily and makes it difficult for small businesses to reinvest in themselves since the pizzo takes a disproportionately larger share of their profits. This in turn results in oligopolistic markets, where a few large firms dominate, selling low-quality products at high prices. Mafia extortion thus mires the Sicilian economy in a poverty trap.

=== Protection from theft ===
Protection from theft is one service that the Mafia provides to paying "clients". Mafiosi themselves are generally forbidden to commit theft (though in practice they are merely forbidden to steal from anyone connected to the Mafia). Instead, mafiosi make it their business to know all the thieves and fences operating within their territory. If a protected business is robbed, the clan will use these contacts to track down and return the stolen goods and punish the thieves, usually by beating them up. Since the pursuit of thieves and their loot often goes into territories of other clans, clans routinely cooperate with each other on this matter, providing information and blocking the sale of the loot if they can.

=== Protection from competition ===
Mafiosi sometimes protect businesspeople from competitors by threatening their competitors with violence. If two businesspeople are competing for a government contract, the protected can ask their mafioso friends to bully their rival out of the bidding process. In another example, a mafioso acting on behalf of a coffee supplier might pressure local bars into serving only their client's coffee.

The primary method by which the Mafia stifles competition, however, is the overseeing and enforcement of collusive agreements between businesspeople. Mafia-enforced collusion typically appears in markets where collusion is both desirable (inelastic demand, lack of product differentiation, etc.) and difficult to set up (numerous competitors, low barriers to entry). Industries which fit this description include garbage collection.

=== Client relations ===
Mafiosi approach potential clients in an aggressive but friendly manner, like a door-to-door salesman. They may even offer a few free favors as an enticement. If a client rejects their overtures, mafiosi sometimes coerce them by vandalizing their property or other forms of harassment. Physical assault is rare; clients may be murdered for breaching agreements or talking to the police, but not for simply refusing protection.

In many situations, mafia bosses prefer to establish an indefinite long-term bond with a client, rather than make one-off contracts. The boss can then publicly declare the client to be under his permanent protection (his "friend", in Sicilian parlance). This leaves little public confusion as to who is and is not protected, so thieves and other predators will be deterred from attacking a protected client and prey only on the unprotected.

Mafiosi generally do not involve themselves in the management of the businesses they protect or arbitrate. Lack of competence is a common reason, but mostly it is to divest themselves of any interests that may conflict with their roles as protectors and arbitrators. This makes them more trusted by their clients, who need not fear their businesses being taken over.

=== Protection territories ===
A Mafia clan cannot tolerate competition within their sphere of influence from another racketeer. If a dispute erupted between two clients protected by rival racketeers, the two racketeers would have to fight each other to win the dispute for their respective clients. The outcomes of such fights can be unpredictable not to mention bloody, and neither racketeer could guarantee a victory for their client. This would make their protection unreliable and of little value. Their clients might dismiss them and settle the dispute by other means, and their reputations would suffer. To prevent this, mafia clans negotiate territories in which they can monopolize the use of violence in settling disputes. This is not always done peacefully, and disputes over territory are at the root of most Mafia wars.

Because Mafia clans provide protection within territorial monopolies, the price of their protection is often high and the quality often low.

== Other activities ==
=== Vote buying ===
Politicians court mafiosi to obtain votes during elections. A mafioso's mere endorsement of a certain candidate can be enough for their clients, relatives, and associates to vote for that candidate. A particularly influential mafioso can bring in thousands of votes for a candidate; such is the respect that a mafioso can command. The Italian Parliament historically had a huge number of seats (630 members in the Chamber of Deputies and 315 members in the Senate; roughly 1 per 64,000 citizens) until it was reduced in a 2020 referendum; Italy also has a large number of political parties competing in parliamentary elections. These two factors meant that a candidate can win with only a few thousand votes. A mafia clan's support can thus be decisive for their success.

Politicians have always sought us out because we can provide votes. [...] between friends and family, each man of honor can muster up forty to fifty other people. There are between 1,500 and 2,000 men of honor in Palermo province. Multiply that by fifty and you get a nice package of 75,000 to 100,000 votes to go to friendly parties and candidates.

— Antonino Calderone

Politicians usually repay this support with favors, such as sabotaging police investigations or giving contracts and permits.

They are not ideological themselves, though mafiosi have traditionally opposed extreme parties such as Fascists and Communists, and favored center candidates.

=== Smuggling ===
Mafiosi provide protection and invest capital in smuggling gangs. Smuggling operations require large investments (goods, boats, crews, etc.) but few people would trust their money to criminal gangs. It is mafiosi who raise the necessary money from investors and ensure that all parties act in good faith. They also ensure that the smugglers operate in safety.

Mafiosi rarely directly involve themselves in smuggling operations. When they do, it is usually when the operations are especially risky. In this case, they may induct smugglers into their clans in the hope of binding them more firmly. This was the case with heroin smuggling, where the volumes and profits involved were too large to keep the operations at arm's length.

=== Bid rigging ===
The Sicilian Mafia in Italy is believed to have a turnover of €6.5 billion through control of public and private contracts. Mafiosi use threats of violence and vandalism to muscle out competitors and win contracts for the companies that they control. They rarely manage the businesses that they control, but take a cut of their profits, usually through payoffs (pizzo).

=== Loan sharking ===
In a 2007 publication, the Italian small-business association Confesercenti reported that about 25.2 percent of Sicilian businesses were indebted to loan sharks, who collected around €1.4 billion a year in payments. This figure rose during the late-2000s recession, as tighter lending by banks forced the desperate to borrow from the Mafia.

=== Forbidden crimes ===
Certain types of crimes are forbidden by Cosa Nostra, either by members or freelance criminals within their domains. Mafiosi are generally forbidden to commit theft (burglary, mugging, etc.). Kidnapping is also generally forbidden, even by non-mafiosi, as it attracts a great deal of public hostility and police attention. These rules have been violated from time to time, both with and without the permission of senior mafiosi.

== Violence and reputation ==
=== Murder ===
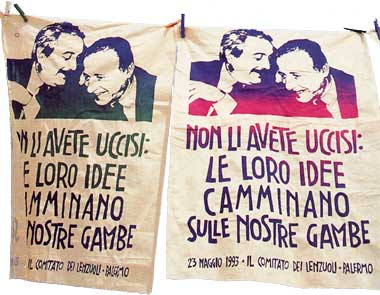
Sheets commemorating murdered Antimafia judges Giovanni Falcone and Paolo Borsellino. They read: "You did not kill them: their ideas walk on our legs".

Murders are almost always carried out by members. It is very rare for the Mafia to recruit an outsider for a single job, and such people are liable to be eliminated soon afterward because they become expendable liabilities. Mafia violence is most commonly directed at other Mafia families competing for territory and business. Violence is more common in the Sicilian Mafia than the American Mafia because Mafia families in Sicily are smaller and more numerous, creating a more volatile atmosphere.

=== Reputation ===
The Mafia's power comes from its reputation to commit violence, particularly murder, against virtually anyone. Through reputation, mafiosi deter their enemies and enemies of their clients. It allows mafiosi to protect a client without being physically present (e.g. as bodyguards or watchmen), which in turn allows them to protect many clients at once.

Compared to other occupations, reputation is especially valuable for a mafioso, as his primary product is protection through intimidation. The reputation of a mafioso is dichotomous: he is either a good protector or a bad one; there is no mediocrity. This is because a mafioso can only either succeed at preventing an act of violence or fail utterly should any violence take place. There is no spectrum of quality when it comes to violent protection. Consequently, a series of failures can completely ruin a mafioso's reputation, and with it his business.

The more fearsome a mafioso's reputation is, the more he can win disputes without having recourse to violence. It can even happen that a mafioso who loses his means to commit violence (e.g. his soldiers are all in prison) can still use his reputation to intimidate and provide protection if everyone is unaware of his weakness and still believes in his power. However, such bluffs generally do not last long, as his rivals may sense his weakness and challenge him.

When a Mafia boss retires from leadership (or is killed), his clan's reputation as effective protectors and enforcers often goes with him. If his replacement has a weaker reputation, clients may lose confidence in the clan and defect to its neighbors, causing a shift in the balance of power and possible conflict. Ideally, the successor to the boss will have built a strong reputation of his own as he worked his way up the ranks, giving the clan a reputable new leader. In this way, established Mafia clans have a powerful edge over newcomers who start from scratch; joining a clan as a soldier offers an aspiring mafioso a chance to build up his own reputation under the guidance and protection of senior mafiosi.

== See also ==
- 'Ndrangheta – Criminal organization in Italy
- Banda della Comasina
- Banda della Magliana – Italian criminal organization
- Basilischi – Organized crime group based in Basilicata, southern Italy
- Camorra – Criminal organization in Italy
- List of Sicilian Mafia clans
- List of Sicilian Mafia members
- List of victims of the Sicilian Mafia
- Mafia Capitale
- Mala del Brenta – Italian criminal organization
- Mandamento (Sicilian Mafia) – District of three geographically contiguous Mafia cosche
- Sacra Corona Unita – Criminal mafia-type organization
- Sicilian Center of Documentation – Anti-Mafia research group in Italy
- Sicilian Mafia during the Mussolini regime
- Stidda – Criminal organization in Sicily, Italy

== Sources ==
- Alcorn, John (2004). Revolutionary Mafiosi: Voice and Exit in the 1890s, in: Paolo Viola & Titti Morello (eds.), L’associazionismo a Corleone: Un’inchiesta storica e sociologica (Istituto Gramsci Siciliano, Palermo, 2004)
- Arlacchi, Pino (1988). Mafia Business. The Mafia Ethic and the Spirit of Capitalism [La mafia imprenditrice (1983)]. Oxford University Press. ISBN 0-19-285197-7.
- Arlacchi, Pino (1993) [1992]. Men of Dishonor: Inside the Sicilian Mafia. Translated by Marc Romano. Morrow. ISBN 0-688-04574-X.
- (in Italian) Arlacchi, Pino (1994). Addio Cosa nostra: La vita di Tommaso Buscetta, Milan: Rizzoli ISBN 88-17-84299-0
- Bandiera, Oriana (2002). "Land Reform, the Market for Protection and the Origins of the Sicilian Mafia: Theory and Evidence". Journal of Law, Economics, & Organization, Vol. 19, No. 1 (Apr., 2003), pp. 218–244.
- Borrometi, Paolo [in Italian] (25 October 2018). Un morto ogni tanto. La mia battaglia contro la mafia invisibile (in Italian). RCS MEDIAGROUP (Solferino Libri). ISBN 978-88-282-0132-8.
- Mancuso, Rosalba (8 November 2019). "Review of (Un morto ogni tanto) A Dead Every Now and Then, by Paolo Borrometi, a book about Mafia". Advicesbooks Book Reviews.
- Chubb, Judith (1989). The Mafia and Politics, Cornell Studies in International Affairs, Occasional Papers No. 23.
- Coco, Vittorio (November 2017). "Christopher Duggan, the mafia and Fascism". Modern Italy. 22 (4): 371–380. doi:10.1017/mit.2017.58. ISSN 1353-2944.
- Dickie, John (2007). Cosa Nostra: A History of the Sicilian Mafia. Hodder. ISBN 978-0-340-93526-2.
- Dimico, Arcangelo, Alessia Isopi, and Ola Olsson. "Origins of the Sicilian Mafia: The market for lemons." Journal of Economic History 77.4 (2017): 1083–1115. online
- Duggan, Christopher (1989). Fascism and the Mafia, New Haven: Yale University Press ISBN 0-300-04372-4
- Duggan, Christopher (2008). The Force of Destiny: A History of Italy Since 1796, Houghton Mifflin Harcourt, ISBN 0-618-35367-4
- Fijnaut, Cyrille & Letizia Paoli (2004), Organised crime in Europe: concepts, patterns, and control policies in the European Union and beyond, Springer, ISBN 1-4020-2615-3
- Franchetti, Leopoldo (1877). Condizioni Politiche e Amministrative della Sicilia. Firenze: G. Barbera.
- Gambetta, Diego (1996) [1993]. The Sicilian Mafia: The Business of Private Protection. Princeton University Press. ISBN 0-674-80742-1.
- Gambetta, Diego (2009). Codes of the Underworld. Princeton University Press. ISBN 978-0691119373.
- Diego Gambetta (2011). "'The Sicilian Mafia'. Twenty Years After Publication". Sociologica (2). doi:10.2383/35869.
- Hess, Henner (1998). Mafia & Mafiosi: Origin, Power, and Myth, London: Hurst & Co Publishers, ISBN 1-85065-500-6
- Lupo, Salvatore (2009). The History of the Mafia. New York: Columbia University Press. ISBN 978-0-231-13134-6.
  - Lupo, Salvatore (2011). History of the Mafia. Columbia University Press. ISBN 978-0231131353.
- McCarthy, Dennis (2011). An Economic History of Organized Crime (PDF). Routledge. ISBN 978-0-203-81425-3. Archived from the original (PDF) on 2015-04-03.
- Mosca, Gaetano (2014). "What is Mafia." M&J, 2014. Translation of the book "Cosa è la Mafia," Giornale degli Economisti, Luglio 1901, pp. 236–262. ISBN 979-11-85666-00-6
- Paoli, Letizia (2003). Mafia Brotherhoods: Organized Crime, Italian Style. New York: Oxford University Press. ISBN 0-19-515724-9.
- Paoli, Letizia (2014). The Oxford Handbook of Organized Crime. Oxford University Press. ISBN 978-0199730445.
- Perocco, Fabio (August 2019). "Caporalato. An Authentic Agromafia". REMHU: Revista Interdisciplinar da Mobilidade Humana. 27 (56): 253–255. doi:10.1590/1980-85852503880005615. hdl:10278/3717879. ISSN 1980-8585. S2CID 203205871.
- Raab, Selwyn (2005). Five Families: The Rise, Decline, and Resurgence of America's Most Powerful Mafia Empires. New York: Thomas Dunne Books. ISBN 978-1-86105-952-9.
- Schneider, Jane T. & Peter T. Schneider (2003). Reversible Destiny: Mafia, Antimafia, and the Struggle for Palermo, Berkeley: University of California Press ISBN 0-520-23609-2
- Seindal, René (1998). Mafia: money and politics in Sicily, 1950–1997, Copenhagen: Museum Tusculanum Press, ISBN 87-7289-455-5
- Servadio, Gaia (1976), Mafioso. A history of the Mafia from its origins to the present day, London: Secker & Warburg ISBN 0-436-44700-2
- Balletta, L., and A.M. Lavezzi (2019), “The Economics of Extortion: Theory and Evidence on the Sicilian Mafia”, Discussion Papers del Dipartimento di Economia e Management – Università di Pisa, n. 242 (http://www.ec.unipi.it/ricerca/discussion-papers.html Archived 2018-01-23 at the Wayback Machine)
