= Diego Gambetta =

Italian-born sociologist (born 1952)

- Born: 1952 (age 73–74); Turin, Italy
- Known for: Analytical contributions to the study of trust and research on the Sicilian Mafia

Academic work
- Institutions: European University Institute, Nuffield College, University of Oxford
- Doctoral students: Heather Hamill

Diego Gambetta (Italian pronunciation: [ˈdjеːɡo ɡamˈbetta]; born 1952) is an Italian-born social scientist. He is a Carlo Alberto Chair at the Collegio Carlo Alberto in Turin. He is well known for his vivid and unconventional applications of economic theory and a rational choice theory approach to understanding a variety of social phenomena. He has made important analytical contributions to the concept of trust by using game theory and signalling theory.

== Career ==
In 1983 Gambetta received his PhD in social and political sciences from the University of Cambridge, where his doctoral supervisor was the late social statistician Cathie Marsh. He was first junior and then senior research fellow at King's College, Cambridge, from 1984 to 1991. From 1995 until 2003 he was reader in sociology at the University of Oxford and fellow of All Souls College. In 2002, he was awarded a title of distinction as professor of sociology and in 2003 he became an official fellow of Nuffield College. From 2012 to 2018, he was a professor of social theory at the European University Institute in Florence. In 2000 he was elected a fellow of the British Academy. He is also a Fellow of the European Academy of Sociology. He has held visiting positions at the University of Chicago, Columbia University, Sciences Po and Collège de France in Paris, and Stanford University.

== Analysis ==
In his book The Sicilian Mafia: The Business of Private Protection (published by Harvard University Press in 1993), he brings a new perspective on an extralegal institution like the Mafia by underscoring the market demand for protection that it satisfies and by showing how mafiosi apparently outlandish rituals and behaviours make organisational sense. His approach has had much influence on the study of mafia-like organisations around the world – it has been applied to cases in Russia, Hong Kong, Japan Bulgaria and mainland China – and more generally on the study of extra-legal governance as well as Mafia Transplantation.

Gambetta has a long lasting interest in trust. In 1987, when the concept was largely ignored in the social sciences, he published a groundbreaking edited collection, with authors from all quarters of the social sciences ("Trust. Making and Breaking Cooperative Relations"). His subsequent work in this area, with the late economist Michael Bacharach, employs game theory to provide a rigorous definition of trust, and signalling theory to understand the nature of trust decisions. This work describes at once how trust can be threatened by "mimics" of signals of trustworthiness, and the general conditions under which signals of trustworthiness can be relied upon. Signalling theory, which emerged simultaneously in economics and biology in the early 1970s –asserts that the reliability of signals, in social interactions among humans and other animals, depends on whether the signals are supported by behaviour that would be too costly for (most) mimics to afford, while being affordable by genuine signallers.

After an imaginative application of the theory to how taxi drivers in dangerous cities decide whether to take on board hailers and callers on the basis of little information, his book Codes of the Underworld. How Criminals Communicate (published by Princeton University Press in 2009) applies signalling theory to analyse how credibility of communication is established in a world where trust is under multiple threats. Thomas Schelling, the Nobel Prize–winning economist, among the first and few to write on the economics of organised crime, wrote that the book "illuminates a vast field of strategic communication where trust cannot be taken for granted. There is nothing comparable in print, and the book's interpretations will carry well beyond the field of conventional crime." The book, listed by New Scientist as one of The best books of 2009, has been described by one reviewer as the product of a “brilliant economic naturalist.”

Gambetta's work has, in recent years, extended to examining violent extremists. A number of Gambetta's research questions have come from "puzzles", unexpected or counter-intuitive correlations, such as the presence of a large proportion of engineers among Islamic radicals. In 2005 he edited “Making Sense of Suicide Missions” (published by Oxford University Press), and in 2016 co-authored with Steffen Hertog the book Engineers of Jihad for Princeton University Press.

In terms of direct intellectual influences on Gambetta's work, in addition to Thomas Schelling, one may count Michael Bacharach, Partha Dasgupta, Jon Elster and Bernard Williams.

A critic of Italian academia, Gambetta has (along with Gloria Origgi) theorized that people in Italian academia have incentives to not deviate from general incompetence because by showing competence, they signal to others that they cannot be relied upon for corruption. However, by displaying incompetence, they signal that they can be trusted to return favors and otherwise engage in corrupt practices.

== Works ==
=== Books ===
2024. Fight, Flight, Mimic. Oxford University Press with Thomas Hegghammer

2016. Engineers of Jihad. Princeton University Press

2009. Codes of the Underworld: How Criminals Communicate. Princeton University Press

2006 (editor). Making Sense of Suicide Missions. Oxford: Oxford University Press

2005. Streetwise. How Taxi Drivers Establish Customers’ Trustworthiness. New York: Russell Sage Foundation (with Heather Hamill)

1993. The Sicilian Mafia. The Business of Private Protection. Harvard University Press

1988a (editor). Trust. Making and Breaking Cooperative Relations. Oxford: Basil Blackwell

1987. Were they pushed or did they jump? Individual decision mechanisms in education. Cambridge: Cambridge University Press

=== Selected articles ===
2012. “The LL-game. The curious preference for low quality and its norms”, Politics, Philosophy and Economics, (with Gloria Origgi)

2010. “Do strong family ties inhibit trust?”, Journal of Economic Behaviour and Organisation, 75, 3, 365–376 (with John Ermisch)

2009. “‘Heroic impatience’: the Baader-Meinhof Gang 1968–1977”, Areté, 29, 11–34 (published in the US in The Nation, 22 March 2010).

2006. “Trust’s odd ways”. In J. Elster, O. Gjelsvik, A. Hylland and K. Moene (eds.) Understanding Choice, Explaining Behaviour Essays in Honour of Ole-Jørgen Skog, Oslo: Unipub Forlag/Oslo Academic Press .

2005. “Deceptive mimicry in humans”. In S. Hurley and N. Chater (eds.), Perspective on Imitation: From Cognitive Neuroscience to Social Science, Cambridge: MIT Press, vol II, pp. 221–241.

2002. “Corruption: An Analytical Map”. In S. Kotkin and A. Sajo (eds.), Political Corruption of Transition: A Sceptic's Handbook, Budapest: Central European University Press, pp. 33–56 (2004 Reprinted in W. Jordan and E. Kreike (eds.), Corrupt histories. University of Rochester Press, pp. 3–28)

2001. “Trust as type identification”. In C. Castelfranchi and Yao-Hua Tan, Trust and Deception in Virtual Societies. Dordrecht: Kluwer Publishers, pp. 1–26 (with Michael Bacharach)

2001. “Trust in signs”. In K. Cook (ed.) Trust and Society, New York: Russell Sage Foundation, pp. 148–184 (with Michael Bacharach)

1998. “Claro!’ An essay on discursive machismo”. In J.Elster (ed.), Deliberative Democracy, Cambridge: Cambridge University Press, pp. 19–43 (2001. Spanish translation, in J.Elster (ed.) Democracia Deliberativa. Barcelona: Editorial Gedisa)

1998. “Concatenations of mechanisms”. In P.Hedstrοm and R. Swedberg (eds.), Social mechanisms. An analytical approach to social theory, Cambridge: Cambridge University Press, pp. 102–24

1995. “Conspiracy among the many: the mafia in legitimate industries” (with Peter Reuter). In G.Fiorentini & S.Peltzman (eds.), The economics of organised crime, Cambridge: Cambridge University Press, pp. 116–136 (2000).

1994. “Inscrutable markets”, Rationality and Society, 6, 3, 353–368

1994. “Godfather's gossip”, Archives Européennes de Sociologie, XXXV, 2, 199–223

1991. “In the beginning was the Word: the symbols of the mafia” Archives Européennes de Sociologie, XXXII, 1, 53–77

1988. “Fragments of an economic theory of the mafia”. Archives Européenes de Sociologie, XXIX, 1, 127–145
