= Pizzo (mafia) =

Protection money

Incidence of organized crime's extortion in Italy by province in 2012 High Mid Low Absent

The pizzo (Italian: [ˈpittso]) is protection money paid to the Mafia often in the form of a forced transfer of money resulting from extortion. The term is derived from the Sicilian pizzu ('beak'). To "let someone wet their beak" (Sicilian: fari vagnari u pizzu) is to pay protection money. The practice used to be widespread in Southern Italy, not only by the Sicilian Cosa Nostra but also by the 'Ndrangheta in Calabria and the Camorra in Campania. Another etymological explanation of the term is "beakerful", referring to the right of an overseer to scoop from the grain being threshed by peasants.

The term pizzu, in the sense of "protection money", may have originated as prison slang and may have been popularized by the Sicilian-language play I mafiusi di la Vicarìa, first performed in 1863. In an 1857 Sicilian dictionary, pizzu is defined only as "beak", whereas an 1868 dictionary includes the figurative sense of protection money.

Paying the pizzo may involve adding someone (often a member of a criminal organisation) to the payroll, provisioning of services by Mafia-controlled businesses or subcontracting to Mafia-controlled companies. Businesses that refuse to pay the pizzo may be burned down. In return for paying the pizzo, businesses receive "protection" and can enlist neighbourhood Mafiosi to cut through bureaucracy or resolve disputes with other tradesmen. Collecting the pizzo keeps the Mafia in touch with the community and allows it to "control their territory".

According to investigators, in 2008 the Mafia extorted more than 160 million euro a year from shops and businesses in the Palermo region, and they estimated that Sicily as a whole paid 10 times that figure. Approximately 80% of Sicilian businesses pay a pizzo. According to University of Palermo, the pizzo averages €457 (US$512) per month for retail traders and €578 for hotels and restaurants, but construction companies are asked to pay over €2,000 per month according to economic daily Il Sole 24 Ore.

Among the first to refuse to pay protection money was Libero Grassi, a shopkeeper from Palermo. In January 1991, he wrote an open letter to the Giornale di Sicilia, the local newspaper. Published on the front page, it was addressed to an anonymous "Dear Extortionist". It caused an uproar and later that same year Grassi was murdered.

In 2004, Addiopizzo (English: "Goodbye Pizzo"), a grassroots consumer movement frustrated with the Mafia's stranglehold on the local economy and political life, peppered Palermo with stickers stating: "An entire populace who pays pizzo is a mob without dignity". The group organise demonstrations wearing black T-shirts with the Addiopizzo logo, a broken circle with an X in the middle and the words "consumo critico" (critical consumption).

== Bibliography ==
- Dickie, John (2004). Cosa Nostra: A History of the Sicilian Mafia. London: Hodder & Stoughton. ISBN 978-0-340-82434-4.
- Paoli, Letizia (2003). Mafia Brotherhoods: Organized Crime, Italian Style, New York: Oxford University Press ISBN 0-19-515724-9 (Review by Klaus Von Lampe) (Review by Alexandra V. Orlova)
