= Addiopizzo =

Grassroots Sicilian movement against Mafia extortion

Addiopizzo logo

Addiopizzo (English: "Goodbye Pizzo") is a grassroots movement established in Sicily to build a community of businesses and consumers who refuse to pay "pizzo"—Mafia extortion money. It is a grassroots social-conscience motivated consumer movement analogous to Fair Trade. The group, led by a generation whose adolescence was characterized by the murders of anti-Mafia judges, journalists and businessmen, operates in the Palermo and Catania metropolitan areas, traditionally Mafia strongholds.

== History ==
=== Background ===
One of the first to refuse to pay protection money was Libero Grassi, a businessman from Palermo. In January 1991, he wrote an open letter to the Giornale di Sicilia, the local newspaper. Published on the front page, it was addressed to an anonymous "Dear Extortionist". It caused an uproar, and barely six months later on 29 August 1991, Grassi was murdered by the Mafia.

=== Launch of Addiopizzo ===
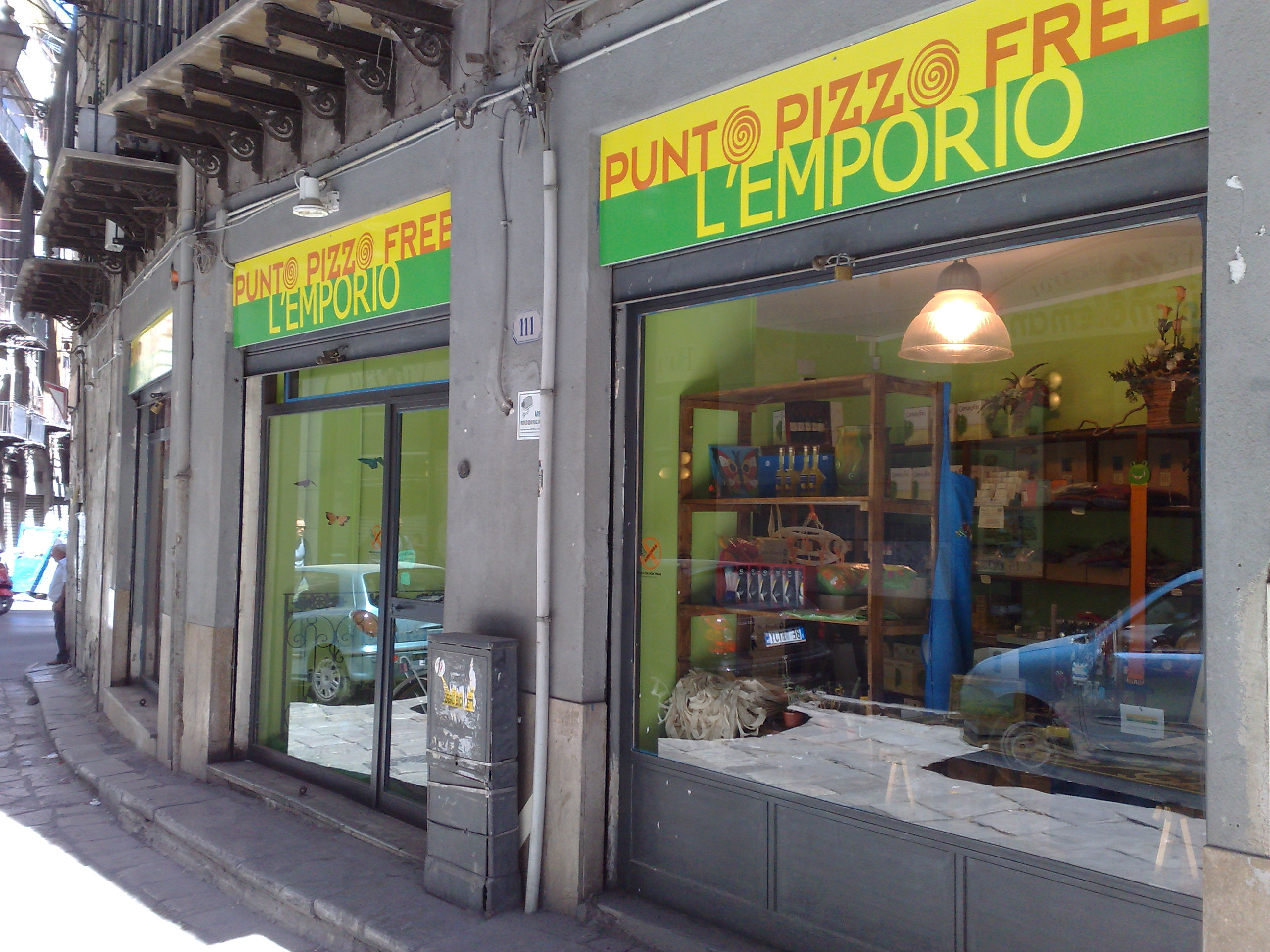
Shop in Palermo that refuses paying pizzo.

In 2004, Addiopizzo began with five graduates who wanted to open a bar in Palermo. Realising they would be asked to pay a Mafia tithe, they decided instead to organise against the pizzo. Frustrated with the Mafia's stranglehold on the local economy and political life, they peppered the city with stickers that were designed to mimic the look of obituary notices and that read: "A whole people who pays the pizzo is a people without dignity." They organized demonstrations wearing black T-shirts with the Addiopizzo logo, a broken circle with an X in the middle and the words consumo critico ("critical consumption").

In 2007, the association counted 210 traders and entrepreneurs as members and over 9,000 consumers committed to buying only at shops belonging to the "pizzo-free" list. Palermo police and the prefect have agreed to discreetly look after the member shops. Addiopizzo organized programs in more than 90 schools and educational institutes, with the participation of prosecutors and police. In May 2006 they organized a "pizzo-free" festival in one of Palermo's main squares. Addiopizzo made headlines around the world when it launched the pizzo-free supermarket Punto Pizzofree in Palermo, which opened in March 2008.

According to 2008 investigators' estimates, Mafia extorted more than 160 million euros every year from shops and businesses in the Palermo region, with the island of Sicily as a whole paying ten times that figure. Around 80 per cent of Sicilian businesses pay a pizzo. According to Palermo University, the pizzo averages 457 euros ($640) a month for retail traders and 578 euros for hotels and restaurants, but construction companies are asked to pay over 2,000 euros per month according to figures published in the economic daily Il Sole 24 Ore.

In 2006, Addiopizzo Catania was founded, with aims similar to those of Addiopizzo Palermo. Addiopizzo Catania works to fight against the Mafia by discouraging shop owners from paying pizzo, educating people, and challenging cultural norms. On 30 October 2012 a delegation of the European Parliament's Special Committee on Organised Crime, Corruption, and Money Laundering (CRIM) invited Addiopizzo Catania to submit a report of its activities, in order to underline the importance of international cooperation against organized crime.

== Addiopizzo Travel ==
Addiopizzo Travel is a project of Addiopizzo that focuses on raising awareness among the many holidaymakers that travel to Sicily every year by helping travellers with finding "pizzo-free" hotels, restaurants, shops, etc. In addition, they run anti-mafia tours for schools, universities, and other interested parties.
