= Heather Hamill =

Sociologist

Heather Hamill is a sociologist who is currently Professor of Sociology at the University of Oxford, St Cross College. She specializes in the study of crime and extralegal governance. Her book, The Hoods: Crime and Punishment in Belfast, about paramilitary punishment attacks in Northern Ireland, won the James Donnelly Sr. Prize for Books in History and Social Sciences, awarded by the American Conference for Irish Studies. According to the award committee:

Hamill's ethnographically-informed analysis of extra-legal punishment in Belfast is social science at its best. She exposes the ways that Catholic and Protestant paramilitary police and punish youth in their own communities and interrogates why such violent social sanctions do not deter "the Hoods." In this way, Hamill's book opens up new terrain in Irish Studies while grounding her conclusions in the cultural and political circumstances of Northern Ireland. It is an extremely well-written academic book that is truly difficult to put down.

In September 2023 Hamill was awarded the Title of Distinction of Professor of Sociology by the University of Oxford.

== Works ==
- Gambetta, Diego; Hamill, Heather (2005). Streetwise: How Taxi Drivers Establish Customer's Trustworthiness. Russell Sage Foundation. ISBN 978-1-61044-235-0.
- Hamill, Heather (2011). The Hoods: Crime and Punishment in Belfast. Princeton University Press. ISBN 978-0-691-18068-7.
