= La Sicilia =

Italian newspaper

- Front page, 6 May 2007
- Type: Daily newspaper
- Format: Berliner
- Owner: Palella Holdings LLC
- Editor: La Sicilia Investimenti S.p.A.
- Founded: 1945; 81 years ago
- Political alignment: Centrism; Conservatism
- Language: Italian
- Headquarters: Catania, Italy
- Circulation: 85,550 (2008)
- ISSN: 1720-8084
- Website: www.lasicilia.it

La Sicilia (lit. 'Sicily') is an Italian national daily newspaper for the island of Sicily. Published in Catania, it is the first best-selling newspaper in Sicily. It was first published in 1945.

== History and profile ==
La Sicilia was founded and first published in 1945, and legally registered at the court of Catania three years later. The paper had a conservative stance.

The circulation of La Sicilia was 64,550 copies in 2008.

== See also ==
- List of newspapers in Italy
- Giornale di Sicilia
