= Giornale di Sicilia =

Italian daily newspaper

- Type: Daily newspaper
- Format: Tabloid
- Owner: Giornale di Sicilia Editoriale Poligrafica (Gazzetta del Sud)
- Editor: Antonio Ardizzone
- Founded: 1860
- Political alignment: Centrism
- Language: Italian
- Headquarters: Palermo, Italy
- Circulation: 67,332 (2008)
- Website: www.gds.it

Giornale di Sicilia (lit. 'Newspaper of Sicily') is an Italian national daily newspaper for the island of Sicily. It is based in Palermo, and is the best-selling newspaper in Sicily. Since 2017, it is owned by the daily newspaper of Messina, Gazzetta del Sud.

== History and profile ==
Giornale di Sicilia was founded in 1860, immediately following the Expedition of the Thousand headed by Giuseppe Garibaldi; it was first published on 7 June of that year under the name "Giornale Officiale di Sicilia" with Girolamo Ardizzone as its first editor-in-chief.

The paper played a significant role in nationalizing the Italian rural women in Sicily at the beginning of the 1900s.

It is published in ten different local versions, one for each province of Sicily plus another one for the city of Palermo.

Giornale di Sicilia had a circulation of 67,216 copies in 2004. The circulation of the paper was 67,332 copies in 2008.

== See also ==
- List of newspapers in Italy
- La Sicilia
