= John Dickie (historian) =

British author, historian and academic

- Born: 1963 (age 62–63); Dundee, Scotland
- Occupations: Author; historian; academic

Academic background
- Education: Pembroke College, Oxford; University of Sussex
- Thesis: Representations of the Mezzogiorno in post-unification Italy (1860–1900) (1992)
- Doctoral advisor: David Forgacs

Academic work
- Discipline: Modern history
- Sub-discipline: Italian history
- Institutions: University College London (1993–present)
- Main interests: History of Southern Italy, history of mafia, food history
- Website: johndickie.net

John Dickie (born 1963) is a British author, historian and academic who specialises in Italy.

== Education ==
Born in Dundee, he was brought up in Leicestershire and went to Loughborough Grammar School. He studied Italian and French at Pembroke College, Oxford, obtaining a Bachelor's degree with first class honours in 1986. He continued his studies at the University of Sussex, completing a Master's degree in critical theory in 1987 and becoming a Doctor of Philosophy in Italian literature in 1993. His dissertation was supervised by David Forgacs.

== Career ==
He is Professor of Italian Studies at University College London, where he has taught since 1993. According to the American Historical Review:

John Dickie is a leading member of a group of young historians working in British universities with a distinctive revisionist thrust to their work on modern and contemporary Italian history. They do not shy away from theory, whether historiographical or broadly social scientific, and are happy to challenge past and current monstres sacres, from Denis Mack Smith to Edward Said.

== Works ==
=== Books authored ===
- Darkest Italy: The Nation and Stereotypes of the Mezzogiorno, 1860–1900 (1999)
- Cosa Nostra: A History of the Sicilian Mafia (2004, rev. edn. 2007),
- Delizia! The Epic History of Italians and their Food (2007)
- Una catastrofe patriottica. 1908: il terremoto di Messina, tr. Fabio Galimberti (2008)
- Blood Brotherhoods: The Rise of the Italian Mafias (2011; republished as Mafia Brotherhoods: Camorra, Mafia, 'Ndrangheta: The Rise of the Honoured Societies, 2012)
- Mafia Republic: Italy's Criminal Curse. Cosa Nostra, 'Ndrangheta and Camorra from 1946 to the Present (2013)
- The Craft: How the Freemasons Made the Modern World (2020)

=== Books edited ===
- Disastro! Disasters in Italy since 1860: Culture, Politics, Society (with John Foot and Frank M. Snowden III, 2002)
- Nel regno di Musolino (with Fabio Truzzolillo, 2016)

== Research interests ==
He states his research interests as "representations of the Italian South, Italian nationalism and national identities, cultural history of liberal Italy, cultural and critical theory, organized crime, Italian food."

== Awards ==
In 2005 President of the Italian Republic awarded him the Commendatore dell'Ordine della Stella della Solidarietà Italiana (Commander of the Order of the Star of Italian Solidarity), an Italian knighthood.

== Personal life ==
In 2005 he married the author Sarah Penny; they have three children.
