= List of Sicilian Mafia members by city =

This is a list of prominent Sicilian mobsters by city.

== Agrigento province ==
=== Campobello di Licata ===
- Giuseppe Falsone (born 1970)

=== Cattolica Eraclea ===
- Nicolo Rizzuto (1924–2010)
- Vito Rizzuto (1946–2013)
- Gerlando Sciascia (1934–1999)

=== Porto Empedocle ===
- Luigi Putrone (born 1960)
- Gerlandino Messina (born 1972)

=== Racalmuto ===
- Maurizio Di Gati (born 1966)

=== Raffadali ===
- Salvatore Cuffaro (born 1958)

=== Sciacca ===
- Salvatore Di Gangi (1945-2021)

=== Siculiana ===
- Alfonso Caruana (born 1946)
- Nicola Gentile (1885–1976)
- Alfred Polizzi (1900–1975)

== Caltanissetta province ==
=== Gela ===
- Daniele Emmanuello (1963–2007)
- Antonio Rinzivillo

=== Mussomeli ===
- Giuseppe Genco Russo (1893–1976)

=== Riesi ===
- Giuseppe Di Cristina (1923–1978)

=== San Cataldo ===
- Leonardo Messina (born 1955)

=== Villalba ===
- Calogero Vizzini (1887–1954)
- Angelo Bruno (1910–1980)

== Catania province ==
=== Adrano ===
- Alfio Santangelo (born 1953)

=== Caltagirone ===
- Francesco La Rocca (1938–2020)
- Salvatore Seminara (born 1946)

=== Catania ===
- Vincenzo Aiello (born 1953)
- Antonio Calderone (1935–2013)
- Giuseppe Calderone (1925–1978)
- Sebastiano Cannizzaro (born 1954)
- Salvatore Cristaldi
- Umberto Di Fazio (born 1962)
- Aldo Ercolano (born 1960)
- Francesco Ferrera (born 1935)
- Eugenio Galea (born 1944)
- Santo La Causa
- Francesco Mangion (1936–2002)
- Giuseppe Mangion (born 1959)
- Santo Mazzei (born 1953)
- Andrea Nizza (born 1986)
- Giuseppe Pulvirenti (1930–2009)
- Benedetto Santapaola (1938–2026)
- Vincenzo Santapaola (born 1969)
- Roberto Vacante (born 1963)
- Maurizio Zuccaro (born 1961)

=== Ramacca ===
- Calogero Conti (1924–2020)

== Messina province ==
=== Messina ===
- Vincenzo Romeo (born 1979)

=== Villafranca ===
- Santo Sfameni (1928-2012)

== Palermo province ==
=== Altofonte ===
- Francesco Di Carlo (1941-2020)
- Santino Di Matteo (born 1954)
- Gioacchino La Barbera (born 1959)
- Domenico Raccuglia (born 1964)

=== Belmonte Mezzagno ===
- Benedetto Spera (born 1934)

=== Bisacquino ===
- Vito Cascio Ferro (1862–1943)

=== Caccamo ===
- Antonino Giuffrè (born 1945)
- John Stanfa (born 1940)

=== Casteldaccia ===
- Giuseppe Panno

=== Ciaculli ===
- Michele Greco (1924–2008)
- Pino Greco (1952–1985)
- Salvatore "Ciaschiteddu" Greco (1923–1978)
- Salvatore "The Engineer" Greco (1924–?)
- Giuseppe Lucchese (born 1958)
- Mario Prestifilippo (1958–1987)
- Vincenzo Puccio (1945–1989)
- Lorenzo Tinnirello

=== Cinisi ===
- Gaetano Badalamenti (1923–2004)
- Cesare Manzella (1897–1963)

=== Corleone ===
- Giuseppe Morello (1867–1930)
- Calogero Bagarella (1935–1969)
- Leoluca Bagarella (born 1942)
- Luciano Leggio (1925–1993)
- Michele Navarra (1905–1958)
- Bernardo Provenzano (1933–2016)
- Salvatore Riina (1930–2017)
- Gaetano Riina (1933-2024)

=== Misilmeri ===
- Salvatore Sciarabba

=== Monreale ===
- Giuseppe Balsano (1945–2005)

=== Montelepre ===
- Salvatore Lombardo

=== Palermo ===
==== Acquasanta ====
- Michele Cavataio (1929–1969)

==== Arenella ====
- Gaetano Fidanzati (1935–2013)

==== Brancaccio ====
- Giuseppe Graviano (born 1963)
- Filippo Graviano
- Rosario Mancino
- Antonino Vernengo
- Cosimo Vernengo
- Pietro Vernengo

==== Carini ====
- Andrea Adamo
- Angela Congigliaro
- Don Agostino Coppola
- Ferdinando "Freddy" Gallina
- Franca Pellerito
- Angelo Antonino Pipitone
- Benedetto Pipitone
- Epifania Pipitone
- Francesco Marco Pipitone
- Gaspare Pulizzi

==== Corso Dei Mille ====
- Filippo Marchese (1938–1983)
- Giuseppe Marchese (born 1963)
- Francesco Tagliavia
- Pietro Tagliavia (born 1978)

==== Noce ====
- Calcedonio Di Pisa (1931–1962)
- Raffaele Ganci (1932-2022)

==== Pagliarelli ====
- Antonio Rotolo (born 1946)
- Giovanni Motisi (born 1959)
- Ignazio Motisi
- Lorenzo Motisi
- Matteo Motisi (1918–2003)
- Gianni Nicchi (born 1981)
- Settimo Mineo (born 1938)

==== Central Palermo ====
- Angelo La Barbera (1924–1975)
- Salvatore La Barbera (1922–1963)

==== Partanna-Mondello ====
- Gaspare Mutolo (born 1940)
- Rosario Riccobono (1929–1982)

==== Passo di Rigano-Boccadifalco ====
- Salvatore Buscemi
- Carlo Gambino (1902–1976)
- Salvatore Inzerillo (1944–1981)
- Michelangelo La Barbera

==== Porta Nuova ====
- Gerlando Alberti (1927-2012)
- Vincenzo Buccafusca
- Tommaso Buscetta (1928–2000)
- Giuseppe Calò (born 1931)
- Salvatore Cancemi (1942–2011)
- Salvatore Cucuzza
- Nicola Ingarao (1961–2007)
- Vittorio Mangano (1940–2000)

==== Resuttana ====
- Giuseppe Bono
- Francesco Madonia (1924–2007)
- Antonino Matranga (1905–1971)

==== Roccamena ====
- Nicolo Schiro (1872-1957)

==== Roccella ====
- Giuseppe Guttadauro (born 1948)

==== San Lorenzo ====
- Giuseppe Giacomo Gambino (1941–1996)
- Filippo Giacalone
- Pino Guastella
- Francesco Madonia (1924–2007)
- Mariano Tullio Troia (1933–2010)

==== Santa Maria di Gesù ====
- Pietro Aglieri (born 1959)
- Francesco Paolo Bontade (1914–1974)
- Stefano Bontade (1939–1981)
- Salvatore Contorno (born 1946)
- Carlo Greco
- Francesco Marino Mannoia (born 1951)

==== Tommaso Natale ====
- Salvatore Lo Piccolo (born 1942)
- Sandro Lo Piccolo

==== Uditore ====
- Pietro Torretta (1912–1975)

==== Villagrazia di Palermo ====
- Benedetto Capizzi (1944-2023)
- Gaetano Lo Presti
- Antonino Sorci (1904–1983)
- Francesco Sorci

=== Partinico ===
- Giovanni Bonomo (1935–2010)
- Nenè Geraci (1917–2007)
- Vito Vitale (born 1959)
- Leonardo Vitale (1941–1984)

=== San Giuseppe Jato ===
- Gregorio Agrigento (1935-2020)
- Bernardo Brusca (1929-2000)
- Giovanni Brusca (born 1957)
- Baldassare Di Maggio (born 1954)
- Salvatore Genovese
- Antonio Salamone (1918–1998)

=== San Mauro Castelverde ===
- Giuseppe Farinella (1925–2017)

=== Trabia ===
- Salvatore Rinella

=== Villabate ===
- Antonio Cottone (1904/05–1956)
- Giuseppe Montalto
- Salvatore Montalto
- Joseph Profaci (1897-1962)

== Trapani province ==
=== Alcamo ===
- Vincenzo Milazzo (died 1992)
- Fillipo Rimi (1923-2014)
- Vincenzo Rimi (1902–1975)

=== Castellammare del Golfo ===
- Joseph Bonanno (1905–2002)
- Giovanni Bonventre (1901–1970)
- Vito Bonventre (1875–1930)
- Stefano Magaddino (1891–1974)
- Salvatore Maranzano (1886–1931)
- Joseph Barbara (mobster) (1905–1959)
- Sebastiano DiGaetano (1862–1912)

=== Castelvetrano ===
- Francesco Messina Denaro (1928-1998)
- Matteo Messina Denaro (1962–2023)
- Alfonso Caruana (born 1946)

=== Mazara del Vallo ===
- Mariano Agate (1939-2013)
- Andrea Manciaracina (born 1962)

=== Salemi ===
- Salvatore Miceli (born 1946)
- Antonio Salvo (1929–1986)
- Ignazio Salvo (1932–1992)

=== Trapani ===
- Vincenzo Virga (born 1936)
