= List of Sicilian Mafia members =

This is a list of members of the Sicilian Mafia born in Sicily.

== A ==
- Mariano Agate (1939–2013)
- Pietro Aglieri
- Vincenzo Aiello
- Gerlando Alberti (1927–2012)
- Giovanni Arena

== B ==
- Gaetano Badalamenti (1923–2004)
- Leoluca Bagarella
- Calogero Bagarella (1935–1969)
- Giovanni Bonomo (1935–2010)
- Francesco Paolo Bontade (1914–1974)
- Giovanni Bontade (1946–1988)
- Stefano Bontade (1939–1981)
- Giovanni Brusca
- Tommaso Buscetta (1928–2000)
- Joseph Bonanno (1905–2002)

== C ==
- Antonino Calderone (1935–2013)
- Giuseppe Calderone (1925–1978)
- Frank Cali (1965–2019)
- Giuseppe Calò
- Salvatore Cancemi (1942–2011)
- Sebastiano Cannizzaro
- Benedetto Capizzi (1944–2023)
- Alfonso Caruana
- Michele Cavataio (1929–1969)
- Calogero Conti (1924–2020)
- Salvatore Contorno
- Antonio Cottone (1904/05–1956)
- Salvatore Cuffaro

== D ==
- Salvatore D'Aquila (1873–1928)
- Francesco Di Carlo (1941–2020)
- Giuseppe Di Cristina (1923–1978)
- Umberto Di Fazio
- Maurizio Di Gati
- Baldassare Di Maggio
- Santino Di Matteo
- Calcedonio Di Pisa (1931–1962)
- Francesco Domingo

== E ==
- Daniele Emmanuello (1963–2007)
- Aldo Ercolano

== F ==
- Giuseppe Falsone
- Giuseppe Farinella (1925–2017)
- Francesco Ferrera
- Gaetano Fidanzati (1935–2013)

== G ==
- Eugenio Galea
- Giuseppe Giacomo Gambino (1941–1996)
- John Gambino (1940–2017)
- Rosario Gambino
- Carlo Gambino (1902–1976)
- Raffaele Ganci (1932–2022)
- Giuseppe Genco Russo (1893–1976)
- Nicola Gentile (1885–1966)
- Nenè Geraci (1917–2007)
- Antonino Giuffrè
- Giuseppe Graviano
- Giuseppe Greco (1952–1985)
- Michele Greco (1924–2008)
- Salvatore "The Engineer" Greco (1924–?)
- Salvatore "Ciaschiteddu" Greco (1923–1978)
- Giuseppe Guttadauro

== I ==
- Salvatore Inzerillo (1944–1981)

== L ==
- Angelo La Barbera (1924–1975)
- Gioacchino La Barbera
- Salvatore La Barbera (1922–1963)
- Santo La Causa
- Francesco La Rocca (1938–2020)
- Luciano Leggio (1925–1993)
- Salvatore Lo Piccolo
- Giuseppe Lucchese
- Lucky Luciano (1897–1962)
- Tommy Lucchese (1899–1967)

== M ==
- Francesco Madonia (1924–2007)
- Stefano Magaddino (1891–1974)
- Andrea Manciaracina
- Vittorio Mangano (1940–2000)
- Francesco Mangion (1936–2002)
- Giuseppe Mangion
- Rosario Mancino
- Cesare Manzella (1897–1963)
- Francesco Marino Mannoia
- Salvatore Maranzano (1886–1931)
- Filippo Marchese (1938–1983)
- Giuseppe Marchese
- Joe Masseria (1886–1931)
- Antonino Matranga (1905–1971)
- Santo Mazzei
- Leonardo Messina
- Francesco Messina Denaro (1928–1998)
- Gerlandino Messina
- Matteo Messina Denaro (1962–2023)
- Salvatore Miceli
- Giuseppe Morello (1867–1930)
- Giovanni Motisi
- Gaspare Mutolo

== N ==
- Rosario Naimo
- Michele Navarra (1905–1958)
- Gianni Nicchi
- Andrea Nizza

== P ==
- Emilio Picariello (1875 or 1879–1923)
- Angelo Antonino Pipitone
- Mario Prestifilippo (1958–1987)
- Bernardo Provenzano (1933–2016)
- Vincenzo Puccio (1945–1989)
- Gaspare Pulizzi
- Giuseppe Pulvirenti (1930–2009)
- Luigi Putrone
- Joe Profaci (1897–1962)

== R ==
- Domenico Raccuglia
- Paolo Renda (1933–disappeared 2010)
- Rosario Riccobono (1929–1982)
- Salvatore Riina (1930–2017)
- Nicolo Rizzuto (1924–2010)
- Vito Rizzuto (1946–2013)
- Vincenzo Romeo
- Antonio Rotolo

== S ==
- Antonio Salamone (1918–1998)
- Antonio Salvo (1929–1986)
- Ignazio Salvo (1932–1992)
- Alfio Santangelo
- Benedetto Santapaola (1938–2026)
- Vincenzo Santapaola (1969–2026)
- Gerlando Sciascia (1934–1999)
- Salvatore Seminara
- Santo Sfameni (1928–2012)
- Vincenzo Sinagra
- Antonino Sorci (1904–1983)
- Santo Sorge (1908–1972)
- Gaspare Spatuzza
- Benedetto Spera
- Frank Scalice (1893–1957)

== T ==
- Pietro Tagliavia
- Pietro Torretta (1912–1975)
- Mariano Tullio Troia (1933–2010)

== V ==
- Roberto Vacante
- Bernardino Verro (1866–1915)
- Vincenzo Virga
- Giusy Vitale
- Leonardo Vitale (1941–1984)
- Vito Vitale
- Calogero Vizzini (1877–1954)

== Z ==
- Maurizio Zuccaro
