= Pietraperzia Mafia family =

Crime family of the Sicilian mafia

- Founded: c.1900s
- Founding location: Pietraperzia, Sicily
- Years active: 1900s–present
- Territory: Pietraperzia, Sicily.
- Ethnicity: Sicilians
- Activities: extortion, corruption, political corruption
- Allies: Catania Mafia family
- Rivals: Barrafranca Mafia family

The Pietraperzia Mafia family is a crime family of the Cosa Nostra based in the city of Pietraperzia, a small town in the province of Enna, Sicily.

Currently, the Pietraperzia family is regarded as a close ally of the powerful Catania Mafia family.

== History ==
The Pietraperzia Mafia family is known to have deep historical roots. On a map made in 1900 by one of the first Mafia researchers, Antonino Cutrera, a former public security officer, the city is already marked as a territory with a Mafia presence. This Mafia development took hold in part due to the State's negligent absence, where the only law was that of the Mafia, serving the interests of local landlords and protecting their people and property. A Mafia war broke out in Pietraperzia in the early 1920s between rival factions, resulting in dozens of deaths. With the rise of Fascism and the intervention of Prefect Cesare Mori, the power of the Pietraperzia Mafia was significantly curtailed.

After this period, the Pietraperzia Mafia family remained in the shadows for several decades, with little known about its activities, until it reemerged in the 1980s. At that time, the family was led by Liborio Micciché, a Freemason and Christian Democracy municipal councilor in Pietraperzia, who also served as consigliere of the 'Province' of Enna during the Interprovincial Commission meetings. In the early 1990s, the Pietraperzia Mafia family entered into a war with the Barrafranca Mafia family, led by Totò Saitta, which resulted in the deaths of both families' bosses in 1992.

Micciché was replaced as head of the family by Giovanni Monachino. Under the leadership of Monachino the Mafia family had become a trusted actor in high-level mafia operations. According to the testimony of mafia informant Leonardo Messina, delivered to Judge Paolo Borsellino shortly after the Capaci bombing of May 1992, several preparatory meetings for the attacks were held in Pietraperzia. Present at these meetings were top Cosa Nostra leaders such as Totò Riina, Bernardo Provenzano, Nitto Santapaola and Piddu Madonia. Giovanni Monachino was reportedly responsible for ensuring the safety of these meetings, installing surveillance antennas to intercept police communications and personally attending to the needs of Riina himself. These revelations led to "Operazione Leopardo" on November 17, 1992, an expansive police operation that resulted in 203 arrest warrants, focusing particularly on the provinces of Enna and Caltanissetta. It became one of the largest anti-mafia crackdowns in Italian history.

In late 2015, Italian authorities launched a new investigation into the Pietraperzia Mafia family, known as Operazione Kaulonia. The operation aimed to uncover the family's structure, business dealings, and external connections. Meanwhile, in February 2016, a Cosa Nostra summit was held in Catania, where representatives from various Sicilian provinces convened. Representing the Pietraperzia Mafa family were Giuseppe Marotta and Gaetano Curatolo, who openly reaffirmed the group's allegiance to the Catania Mafia family, the dominant mafia force in eastern Sicily. This partnership was later confirmed by documented meetings between senior members of both organizations to negotiate payments demanded from a businessman working on fiber optic installations in Catania.

In June 2016, Italian authorities arrested individuals tied to the Pietraperzia family for their involvement in the infiltration of construction projects linked to Expo Milano 2015. According to a 2018 ruling by the Sixth Criminal Section of the Milan Tribunal, the family had laundered significant amounts of money, originating from tax-related crimes, and reinvested them into contracts for the global event. The investment, estimated at €18 million, served not only to finance the clan's activities but also to expand its operational reach in Lombardy and Northern Italy.

On July 16, 2017, the Pietraperzia family was responsible for the murder of Filippo Giuseppe Marchì in the neighboring town of Barrafranca. Marchì was formerly the driver and trusted associate of Giuseppe Saitta, son of Totò Saitta. The killing was orchestrated at the countryside property of Vincenzo Di Calogero, where the plan was developed. Gaetano Curatolo, Angelo Di Dio, and Calogero Bonfirraro conducted the reconnaissance, and the murder was ordered by the Monachino brothers themselves.

By March 26, 2019, Operazione Kaulonia reached its operational conclusion. At dawn that day, 21 people were arrested by the Carabinieri’s ROS unit under an order from the GIP of Caltanissetta, including Giovanni and his brother, Vincenzo Monachino. The charges covered mafia association, murder, extortion, weapons offenses, robbery, theft, receiving stolen goods, and rigged public contracts. One of the most critical pieces of evidence was a video showing a summit between the Pietraperzia Mafia and leaders of the Catanese Mafia, held in a rural property in Sicily’s interior. Prosecutor Amedeo Bertone remarked that the presence of Cosa Nostra’s Catania bosses in the city demonstrated the Pietraperzia family’s importance and influence within the mafia hierarchy.

In September 2024, authorities uncovered a significant weapons cache in the countryside of Pietraperzia, confirming the military strength of the Mafia family. The arsenal, hidden by a trusted associate of the Monachino, included assault rifles, Kalashnikovs, shotguns, pistols, and large quantities of ammunition, all ready for use. This discovery led to the arrest of several key members of the Pietraperzia mafia. According to Elena Barreca, head of the Enna police’s mobile unit, the quantity of weapons seized was unprecedented since the 1990s. Investigations revealed the mafia’s use of intimidation, extortion, and violence to control territory. In one particularly disturbing incident, a drug dealer was publicly humiliated and slapped by the boss for operating without permission, an act he accepted without resistance, thereby recognizing the boss's authority. Authorities suspect the weapons were not only for local enforcement but could also have been used in broader mafia operations. The presence of war-grade weaponry, especially Kalashnikov rifles, raised alarms over their potential use against armored vehicles or in violent acts.
