= Sebastiano Cannizzaro =

Member of the Sicilian mafia

Sebastiano “Nuccio” Cannizzaro (born 1954) is a Sicilian mafioso and senior figure in the Catania Mafia family, which he came to lead during a turbulent period in the history of Cosa Nostra in the mid-1990s. In that same period, he also served as the family's representative on the Interprovincial Commission, a position he held until his arrest in 1998. He is currently serving a life sentence.

== Criminal career ==
Cannizzaro's criminal career was marked by strategic manoeuvres to maintain and expand his influence within the Catania Mafia. He was a key player in the 1990s attempt to supplant the Santapaola family with the Mazzei clan (a crime clan independent of the Cosa Nostra), a project conceived by those loyal to the Corleonesi. This initiative, led by the Corleonesi's trusted men like Leoluca Bagarella and Giovanni Brusca, involved efforts to introduce a more violent, terror-driven approach to the Catanese underworld. However, Cannizzaro's intervention put a stop to these efforts, maintaining the power of the Santapaola family in the region.

In the late 1990s, Cannizzaro's involvement in mafia affairs continued, and he was deeply embedded in the operations of the Santapaola clan. During this period, he played a key role in various criminal activities, including murder and extortion. One of the most notable events from this time was the killing of Massimiliano Vinciguerra, a close associate of the Mazzei clan, who was killed on Cannizzaro's orders. Vinciguerra, once an ally of Cannizzaro, had been caught in a deadly betrayal, and his murder was a direct response to the Mazzei's attempts to seize control in Catania. Vinciguerra's killing marked a significant turning point in the mafia war between the two factions, as Cannizzaro's response was swift and brutal, reaffirming the power of the Santapaola clan in the region.

Cannizzaro's criminal career, however, was not without consequences. In 1998, he was arrested during the "Orione" operation, a large-scale police initiative aimed at dismantling the Santapaola clan's operations. Despite being incarcerated, Cannizzaro continued to exert influence over mafia activities, giving orders from within the prison system. His authority was maintained through intermediaries who carried out his directives, and his name continued to command fear and respect even from behind bars.

Although he was temporarily released in 2007 due to procedural time limits, he went into hiding shortly before the Court of Cassation confirmed his final life sentence for homicide. After two months on the run, he was recaptured by police in Mascalucia, a town near Catania. Cannizzaro was later subjected to the regime of the 41-bis prison, a harsh form of solitary confinement reserved for high-profile mafia leaders.

In 2019, Cannizzaro made headlines again when he won a landmark legal victory in the Constitutional Court of Italy, which ruled in his favour regarding the controversial issue of "ergastolo ostativo" (life imprisonment without the possibility of parole). This decision sparked public debate, especially given Cannizzaro's involvement in serious criminal activities. However, he continued to deny the charges against him, asserting that he had never personally committed murder and rejected any notion of remorse or repentance. According to his lawyer, Cannizzaro remained resolute in his fight against the judicial system, emphasizing that his legal battles were about securing even a few more days of freedom.

Despite his incarceration, Cannizzaro's name continued to be invoked in connection with ongoing criminal activity. In 2020, his name resurfaced during an investigation into extortion activities in Catania. It was reported that his name was used by mafia members to intimidate business owners and enforce extortion demands.
