= Salvatore Cappello =

Sicilian crime boss

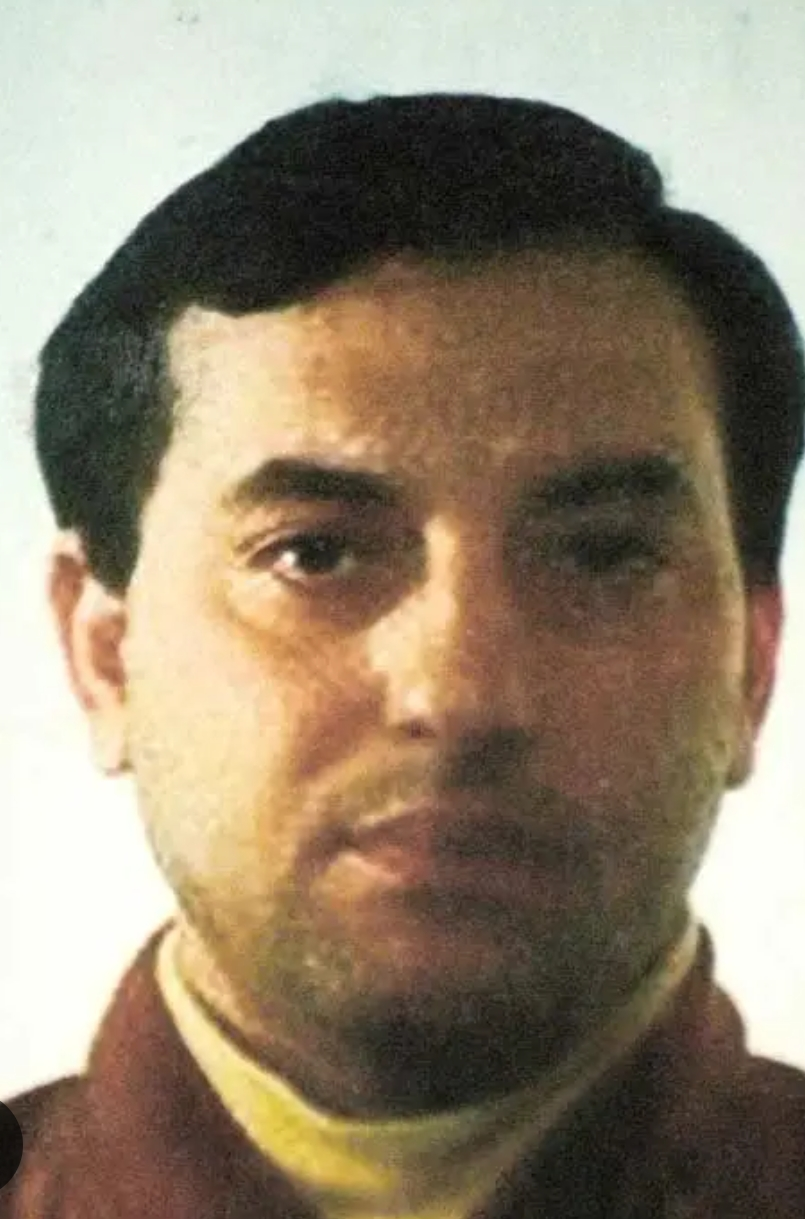
Mugshot of Salvatore Cappello.

Salvatore Cappello (born 8 May 1959) is an Italian criminal, founder and former leader of the Cappello clan, a criminal group active in the city of Catania, in Sicily.

The clan founded by Cappello is one of the crime groups in the area of Catania that remains independent from the Cosa Nostra, at times even entering into direct conflict with it.

== Biography ==
Salvatore Cappello began his criminal career at a young age in 1973, when he stole a gold crucifix from the Bishop of Trapani. Although immediately arrested, the act gained him recognition among Catania Mafia family members. He would later become the protégé and appointed successor of Salvatore Pillera, a former member of the Catania Mafia family who, following the killing of Giuseppe Calderone and the rise of Nitto Santapaola, decided to form his own independent crime clan in opposition to Cosa Nostra. Pillera named Cappello acting leader of the clan in 1986. This decision caused internal disputes, especially with senior figures like Giuseppe Sciuto ("Pippo Tigna") and Gaetano Laudani, but was ultimately upheld by Pillera's right-hand man, Giuseppe Salvo.

Cappello's leadership altered the power balance within Pillera's organization, leading to a violent feud, particularly with the Laudani faction. After being arrested in 1988 and later released on temporary leave, Cappello disappeared, beginning a long period as a fugitive. During this time, he led a bloody war against the Laudanis. The murder of his ally Antonino "Nino" Pace sparked a series of retaliatory killings, including the murder of Cappello's brother, Santo, who was uninvolved in organized crime. By the early 1990s, tensions within the Pillera clan led to a permanent split. In 1992, during a prison meeting, Cappello, along with Giuseppe Salvo, founded the Cappello clan. Although Cappello initially proposed naming the group after Jimmy Miano, leader of the Milanese Cursoti, resistance from younger leaders resulted in the creation of an independent Catanese faction. The new clan soon formed alliances with the Calabrian 'Ndrangheta, particularly with boss Franco Coco Trovato.

Cappello and Salvo are recognized as the historic leaders of the clan, alongside Ignazio Bonaccorsi ("u' carateddu"), who joined from the Pillera clan and rose to leadership within the Cappello group.

Incarcerated under the 41-bis regime since 1993, Salvatore Cappello has been linked to approximately 200 murders, both as perpetrator and mastermind, mostly connected to mafia wars in Catania. Informants later revealed his role in several high-profile killings, including the 1990 assassination of Claudio Di Mauro in Rome, carried out in retaliation for a murder tied to Cappello's close associate. Another notable case involved the murder of Santo Laudani, shot in the head by Cappello inside a butcher shop in Catania.

Years later, his involvement in mafia-related killings from the 1980s and 1990s resurfaced in court proceedings. He was sentenced to life in prison for the murders of Matteo D’Anna and Enzo Pirrone, both committed in 1991 in Lombardy. D’Anna was gunned down outside a pub in Pioltello by two assailants on a motorcycle. Pirrone, under house arrest, was killed at his home in Prato Sesia, Piedmont, by gunmen disguised as police officers. These murders were part of a violent feud between Catanese and Milanese mafia factions.
