= Santo Mazzei =

Member of the Sicilian mafia

Santo Mazzei (born 1953), known as "‘u carcagnusu", is a Sicilian mafioso from Catania. He gained notoriety in the early 1990s for a failed coup attempt against Nitto Santapaola's leadership within the Catania Mafia. Mazzei is currently serving a life sentence in prison.

== Criminal career ==
Born in 1953 and originally affiliated with the Cursoti clan, a criminal group active in Catania and independent of the Cosa Nostra, Mazzei later distanced himself from that faction and forged a significant alliance with the Corleonesi. This alignment culminated in his formal initiation as a man of honour in the early 1990s, while he was a fugitive. The ceremony was allegedly attended by the upper echelon of the Catania Mafia family, including, Nitto Santapaola, Vincenzo Aiello and Eugenio Galea, as well as by high-ranking Corleonesi bosses Leoluca Bagarella, Giovanni Brusca, and Antonino Gioè, who regarded Mazzei as their trusted ally in Catania, thanks to his alignment with and support for their so-called "stragist strategy", a campaign of violent attacks aimed at pressuring the Italian state.

The Corleonesi, particularly Bagarella and Vito Vitale, sought to displace the powerful Santapaola-Ercolano family within the Catanese Mafia and replace them with the Mazzei family. Santo Mazzei was designated to lead this power shift. However, Mazzei was captured by police in November 1992 during a checkpoint operation on the Etna roads. At the time, he was armed and accompanied by a trusted associate. He has remained in prison ever since, serving a life sentence under the strict 41-bis regime.

Despite Mazzei's arrest, the campaign to seize control of the Catania Mafia family was weakened but not abandoned. The Mazzei faction, with the backing of Palermo’s “stragista” leadership, continued its aggressive push for power. This attempted coup led to a bloody confrontation. The Santapaola-Ercolano family, still cohesive and strategically unified, responded with equal force. As violence escalated, many of the conspirators aligned with the Mazzei were eliminated. Ultimately, the Santapaola family prevailed, reestablishing control over Catania’s Mafia clan. The aftermath left the Mazzei clan in a precarious position: officially admitted into Cosa Nostra by the Corleonesi, yet regarded as outsiders by the traditional Catanese hierarchy.

Even while incarcerated, Mazzei maintained influence over his criminal network. In 1998, he was recorded using a mobile phone from inside the Augusta prison to issue operational commands, including decisions related to targeted violence, as part of the ongoing struggle to undermine the Santapaola family's dominance.

Mazzei’s son, Sebastiano Mazzei, also known as Nucciu 'u carcagnusu, born in 1972, succeeded him as the de facto leader of the Mazzei clan. Sebastiano had been involved in the organization from a young age and had several criminal records, including from his time as a minor. He became a fugitive on multiple occasions, most notably from April 2014 until his arrest in 2015. He was found in a well-equipped villa in Ragalna, hiding with his wife and dog, with mobile phones and an axe hidden under the bed. He was taken into custody without resistance.

Under Sebastiano’s leadership, the Mazzei clan maintained operations in extortion, drug trafficking, and usury, expanding their influence beyond San Cristoforo to areas such as Lineri, Bronte, Adrano, and Misterbianco. In Bronte, Francesco Montagno Bozzone, born in 1961 and later imprisoned under 41-bis, led a bloody feud against Santapaola-aligned factions. In Misterbianco, a prison alliance between Santo Mazzei and Antonino Nicotra of the Tuppi clan was reported by informants, re-establishing Nicotra's influence in the area.

Santo Mazzei’s communications with the outside world were primarily through his wife, Rosa Morace, who reportedly played a crucial role in maintaining the cohesion of the family structure during his incarceration. In April 2020, during the COVID-19 pandemic, Mazzei’s request for early release on health grounds was denied. The court in Reggio Emilia ruled that he was receiving adequate medical care and that the 41-bis regime itself reduced his risk of infection.

Despite never achieving the intended takeover of the Catanese mafia, Santo Mazzei’s legacy remains significant. Under his leadership, the Carcagnusi became a formidable force in eastern Sicily, formally integrated into Cosa Nostra by Corleonese mandate and known for their strategic alliances, territorial expansion, and enduring presence in organized crime even under the constraints of maximum-security imprisonment.
