= Interprovincial Commission =

Governing body of Cosa Nostra

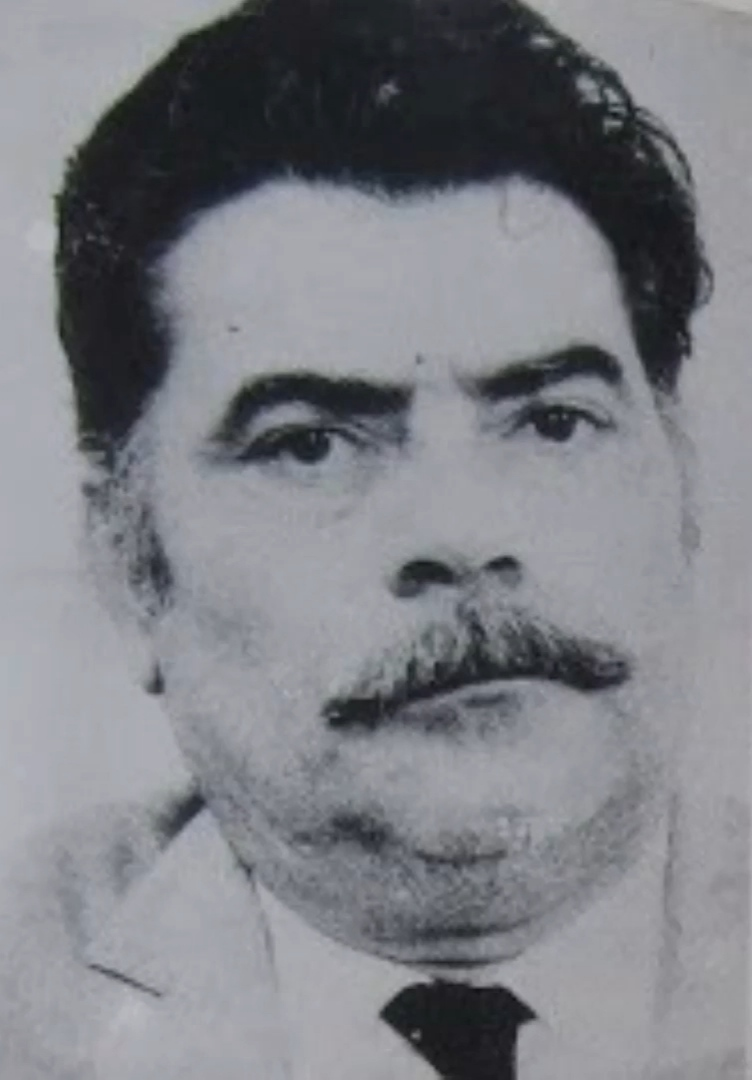
Giuseppe Calderone, the instigator of the Interprovincial Commission.

The Interprovincial Commission (Italian: Commissione interprovinciale), also known as "Regione", "commissione regionale" or "cupola regionale") is a governing body of the Cosa Nostra. It gathered only to deliberate important decisions about the Cosa Nostra interests between several provinces in the same territory that involved other crime families.

== History ==
The first "Interprovincial Commission" was created in '50s by the boss of Trapani Andrea Fazio, but it was dissolved after the beginning of the First Mafia War in 1963. Then it was recreated in 1975 on the proposal of the boss of the family of Catania, Giuseppe Calderone, who wanted to avoid the oligarchy of Michele Greco, Luciano Leggio and Gaetano Badalamenti.

Calderone was appointed to manage the commission: it was decided that only the mafiosi delegates of every Sicilian province, except Messina, Siracusa and Ragusa, had to participate in the commission. These delegates imposed the prohibition to execute kidnapping in Sicily in order to stop extortion abductions carried out by Corleone clan led by Leggio.

According to the pentito Antonino Calderone, at the beginning the "Regione" meetings occurred monthly in one of the several provinces, but hereafter they occurred always at the Michele Greco's farmstead in Ciaculli.

In 1978 Calderone and Giuseppe Di Cristina were killed and the management of the "Commissione interprovinciale" went to Giuseppe Settecasi, but even him was murdered in 1981 during a mafia war in Agrigento province that saw the rising of the boss Carmelo Colletti, tied to Bernardo Provenzano, who became the new provincial delegate of Agrigento; so the management of the "Commissione interprovinciale" went to Greco, mafioso delegate of Palermo province because he managed the Cupola.

According to the pentito Antonino Giuffrè, in 1983 there was a meeting in the Caccamo campaign in which several bosses participated: Salvatore Riina, Bernardo Provenzano, Michele Greco, Bernardo Brusca, Nitto Santapaola's brother (in representation of Catania province), Colletti (for Agrigento province), Giuseppe "Piddu" Madonia (for Caltanissetta and Enna provinces) and some mafiosi of Trapani province. In that meeting it was decided that the management of the "Commissione interprovinciale" went directly to Riina.

== Last known composition (mid-2000s) ==
After the arrest of Bernardo Provenzano on April 11, 2006, the Interprovincial Commission began to lose its operational influence. Key provincial bosses were captured in major operations, which dismantled much of the organization’s leadership structure. From the 2010s onward, there have been no confirmed reports of further meetings among provincial Mafia leaders. While this absence may suggest that the Commission ceased to operate altogether, it is also possible that such gatherings continued in greater secrecy, evading law enforcement detection.

Province	Representative	Notes
Palermo	Salvatore Lo Piccolo	Arrested in 2007 in Giardinello after twenty-five years on the run.
Catania	Vincenzo Aiello	Arrested in 2009 during a mafia summit in Belpasso.
Caltanissetta	Giuseppe Modica	Arrested in 2011 during the operation "Grande Vallone".
Trapani	Matteo Messina Denaro	Arrested in 2023 in Palermo, after 30 years on the run.
Agrigento	Giuseppe Falsone	Arrested in Marseille in 2010, after eleven years on the run.
Enna	Salvatore Seminara	Released from prison in 2013 and rearrested in the same year.

== See also ==
- Sicilian Mafia Commission
- Giuseppe Calderone
