= Maurizio Zuccaro =

Member of the Sicilian mafia

Maurizio Zuccaro (born 1961) is a Sicilian mafioso and a notorious figure within the Catania Mafia family.

== Criminal career ==
Maurizio Zuccaro was born in 1961 into a deeply rooted mafia family in Catania, Sicily. His father, Saro Zuccaro, was a notorious and influential mafia figure, known as the capodecina of San Cocimo, a key district in Catania’s criminal landscape. The Zuccaro family had long-standing ties with the Santapaola-Ercolano mafia clan, one of the most powerful in Sicily. Maurizio is also the brother-in-law of Enzo Santapaola, son of the infamous Salvatore Santapaola (brother of Nitto), which further cemented his place within Catania's mafia hierarchy. In the 1980s, Maurizio Zuccaro led a flamboyant and high-profile social life in Catania, known as a viveur within the city's vibrant nightlife and elite circles. This period, often referred to as his “golden years,” marked a time of relative freedom and public prominence before his later arrests and convictions curtailed his activities.

In the 1990s, Maurizio Zuccaro was involved in numerous criminal activities and was eventually sentenced to life imprisonment for the murder of Salvatore Vittorio, who disappeared in 1996 and was believed to be a victim of lupara bianca. The case was reopened in 2010 after an anonymous letter led authorities to the body, which was found dismembered in Vaccarizzo, in the province of Catania. In addition to this definitive conviction, Zuccaro remains under investigation for the 1996 murder of Luigi Ilardo, a former mafioso and police informant. He is also accused of being involved in the murders of Massimo Giordano and Vito Bonanno, who was allegedly eliminated for belonging to the “Malpassoti” group linked to mafia informant Giuseppe Pulvirenti.

In 2013, Zuccaro showed extreme determination to obtain house arrest. While hospitalized at Ferrarotto Hospital in Catania, he deliberately deteriorated his health by performing bloodletting on himself, using needles in his arm and groin. Hidden cameras and video surveillance recorded these actions, leading to the reinstatement of his prison custody.

According to the pentito Santo La Causa, Maurizio Zuccaro commanded a loyal group including key associates and family members who managed extortion and usury operations. Their victims ranged from wholesalers to supermarket chains and construction entrepreneurs. Zuccaro often turned extortion victims into business partners, expanding his economic influence. Notably, some testimonies about his role in mafia killings and business activities during house arrest were partially omitted by prosecutors. Despite legal pressures, Zuccaro maintained significant control over criminal and economic affairs in Catania.

Zuccaro allegedly continued to run the San Cocimo faction in Catania from prison through his wife, Graziella Acciarito, and sons, Rosario and Filippo. This was revealed in the operation called "Operazione Zeta" carried out by the Catania police, leading to 14 individuals placed under precautionary measures. The investigation uncovered mafia-related activities including extortion, usury, fictitious asset ownership, illegal possession of firearms, and drug offenses. The group forced the management of a popular nightclub to pay €3,000 and hire their associates as security personnel, causing conflict with another crime clan, the Cappello-Bonaccorsi. Wiretaps and financial surveillance exposed fake ownership of business shares, including a seaside restaurant, used to hide mafia investments. Rosario Zuccaro also faces charges of aggravated usury for lending €4,000 at a 10% monthly interest rate. The investigation spanned from June 2016 to May 2017 and revealed the clan's operations centered in the San Cocimo area of Catania.

In 2023, he received an additional 20-year sentence for mafia association following the anti-mafia investigation “Zeta.” Rosario Zuccaro, Maurizio’s son, was also convicted and sentenced to 13 years for mafia-related crimes. In contrast, his other son, Filippo Zuccaro, known by the stage name Andre Zeta, was acquitted, clearing his name after four years of public scrutiny. Other family members and associates faced charges with mixed outcomes, including acquittals for alleged mafia-related offenses connected to business activities and extortion.

In 2024, the Direzione Investigativa Antimafia (DIA) executed a confiscation order issued by the Catania Court against Antonino and Carmelo Paratore, father and son entrepreneurs linked to Maurizio Zuccaro. The Paratores led one of eastern Sicily’s most significant business groups, operating mainly in waste management, hospital cleaning services, real estate, and coastal resorts. Judicial investigations spanning over 40 years revealed their rise from modest beginnings to wealthy entrepreneurs was fueled by substantial illicit capital investments originating from Zuccaro’s criminal activities. The confiscated assets include 14 companies, 8 buildings, and various financial holdings, valued at over €100 million and now under state control. The court also imposed a special surveillance measure with residency restrictions on the Paratores.
