= Vincenzo Aiello =

Member of the Sicilian mafia

- Born: 1953 (age 72–73); Catania, Sicily, Italy
- Other name: Enzo Aiello
- Occupation: Mafioso
- Allegiance: Catania Mafia family / Cosa Nostra
- Criminal charges: Mafia association, multiple murder
- Penalty: Life imprisonment

Vincenzo Aiello (born in 1953) is an Italian mafioso from Catania. Often operating from behind the scenes, he has long been considered a trusted associate and loyal confidant of Nitto Santapaola, the former undisputed boss of the Catania Mafia family.

== Criminal career ==
In 1992, Aiello was reportedly part of a delegation that met with prominent Corleonesi figures, Giovanni Brusca, Leoluca Bagarella, and Antonino Gioè, to sanction the affiliation of Santo Mazzei into the Catania Mafia family. Following Santapaola's arrest in 1993, Aiello was allegedly appointed as his successor. However, his leadership was short-lived. After an eight-month period as a fugitive, Aiello was arrested in August 1994 during the "Orsa Maggiore" anti-mafia operation, the most extensive investigation into organised crime ever conducted in Catania at the time.

Aiello resurfaced in the news in October 2009, when he was arrested during a clandestine mafia summit in San Pietro Clarenza. The gathering, reportedly led by Santo La Causa, one of Italy's most wanted fugitives, was believed to be a strategic meeting of the Santapaola Mafia clan aimed at countering the rise of the rival Cappello clan.

In 2017, Aiello was sentenced to life imprisonment for the double homicide of Angelo Santapaola and his driver-bodyguard Nicola Sedici, murdered in a disused slaughterhouse along the Catania–Gela road. Currently incarcerated at the Bancali prison, he was temporarily transferred to Rebibbia due to health-related concerns. In 2018, Aiello was involved in an altercation with a correctional officer following a cell inspection, leading to charges of insulting and resisting a public official. While prosecutors claimed he threatened the officer with a mop, Aiello maintained he was simply inquiring about the removal of personal items and felt provoked by the officer's behaviour.

Even behind bars, Aiello reportedly continued to exert influence within the Cosa Nostra. Testimonies from the cooperating witness Carmelo Aldo Navarria revealed that Aiello sent handwritten letters to communicate strategic directives, avoiding traditional mafia "pizzini." One such letter warned Navarria that the Monte Po faction did not align with the official Santapaola line, reinforcing the authority of Vincenzo Santapaola, Nitto's son. Aiello's messages influenced shifts in loyalty and operational decisions within the clan, underscoring his enduring role in the organisation's inner workings.
