= Giuseppe Fava =

Italian journalist (1925–1984)

- Born: 15 September 1925; Palazzolo Acreide, Kingdom of Italy
- Died: 5 January 1984 (aged 58); Catania, Italy
- Occupation: Journalist
- Children: Claudio Fava
- Writing career
- Language: Italian

Giuseppe "Pippo" Fava (Italian pronunciation: [dʒuˈzɛppe ˈpippo ˈfaːva]; 15 September 1925 – 5 January 1984) was an Italian writer, investigative journalist, playwright, and Antimafia activist who was killed by the Mafia. He was the founder of the I Siciliani, a monthly magazine. His motto in life was "Is there any use in living if you don't have the courage to fight?"

== Journalism ==
Born and raised in Palazzolo Acreide in the province of Siracusa in Sicily, Fava moved to Catania to study law. Graduating in 1947, he soon moved to journalism and became a professional journalist in 1952. He became the editor-in-chief of the Espresso Sera daily newspaper in Catania—the main city on Sicily's east coast—and in 1980, he assumed the same position at Il Giornale del Sud, where he formed a team of young journalists that turned the paper into an independent, investigative journal. At the time, not much was known about the owners, but it became clear that some of them had connections with the Mafia. Fava was fired.

== I Siciliani ==
In 1983, Fava and his team of independent journalists founded the progressive monthly magazine I Siciliani ("The Sicilians"). The magazine denounced the connections between Mafia, politics, and business in Catania. Fava also became part of the movement against the deployment of Ground-Launched Cruise Missiles (GLCM) by NATO at Comiso airport in June 1983.

However, it was the investigations into the Cosa Nostra and its tentacles in politics and business, in particular those of Sicily's biggest Catania-based construction firms, owned by the four famous entrepreneurs known as Cavalieri del Lavoro—Carmelo Costanzo, Francesco Finocchiaro, Mario Rendo, and Gaetano Graci (one of the owners of the newspaper that had sacked Fava)—that would determine Fava's fate. Graci went on regular hunting parties with Nitto Santapaola, the undisputed Mafia boss of Catania, who was on the payroll of Costanzo as well. In the first edition of I Siciliani, Fava published the article "I quattro cavalieri dell'apocalisse mafiosa" ("The four horsemen of the Mafia apocalypse"), exposing the corruption and political influence peddling by the four entrepreneurs that tied together the local Mafia, high finance, and political figures.

== Death and aftermath ==
On 5 January 1984, Fava was killed while he was waiting to pick up his granddaughter, who was rehearsing a part in a theatre comedy. The week before, he had been a guest on Enzo Biagi's national TV show on Rete 4, where he denounced the sway the Mafia held in parliament.

In 1994, Maurizio Avola, a nephew of Santapaola, confessed to killing Fava, and became a pentito. He also confessed to some seventy other murders. Avola said that his uncle Nitto Santapaola had ordered the killing of the journalist, as a favour to the cavalieri. In 1998, Santapaola and Aldo Ercolano were convicted for ordering the killing of Giuseppe Fava. In 2001, the Court of Appeal in Catania confirmed the life sentences of Santapaola and Ercolano and the actual killer, Maurizio Avola, but acquitted Marcello D'Agata, Vincenzo Santapaola (nephew of Nitto Santapaola), and Franco Giammuso, who had allegedly assisted in the murder. Avola was sentenced to six years and six months in prison. In 2003, the Supreme Court confirmed the sentences of Santapaola, Ercolano, and Avola.

Fava's son, Claudio, was until 2009 a Member of the European Parliament for Italy with the Democrats of the Left (DS).

The volumes Process to Sicily and The Sicilians of 1970 and 1978, respectively, collect Giuseppe Fava's most meaningful journalistic inquiries. Among his novels are Gente di rispetto (1975), Prima che vi uccidano (1977), and Passione di Michele (1980).

== See also ==
- List of victims of the Sicilian Mafia
- List of journalists killed in Europe
