= Eugenio Galea =

Member of the Sicilian mafia

Eugenio Galea (born 1944) is a Sicilian mafioso and a high-ranking member of the Catania Mafia family. Throughout his career, Galea was considered one of the most trusted lieutenants of the Santapaola clan and was dubbed the 'Mafia's Foreign Minister' by the media due to his management of the Catania mafia's international dealings.

== Criminal career ==
In the early 1990s, after the arrests of Nitto Santapaola and Aldo Ercolano, Galea assumed a critical leadership role within the Catania Mafia family. By 1995, he was not only the head of the family but also its "foreign minister," responsible for managing the clan's vast financial operations, including money laundering activities, particularly in Eastern Europe. His connections in Romania played a significant role in the clan's ability to invest in properties and casinos, laundering money and expanding its reach. Despite being a relatively unknown figure before 1990, Galea's rise to power within the Catania Mafia was swift. He quickly became a key player in the Mafia family, managing relations with other Mafia families across Sicily and participating in the Interprovincial Commission of the Cosa Nostra, which made decisions on major criminal activities.

Galea's criminal career culminated in his two-year-long fugitive status, which ended in 1995 when he was captured in a villa on the slopes of Mount Etna. During the operation, the police surrounded his house, and Galea was arrested without resistance. This operation was part of a broader investigation led by the anti-mafia prosecutor's office in Catania.

In the following years, Galea's name continued to appear in major anti-mafia investigations. In 2006, he was arrested once again, this time on charges of mafia association and aggravated extortion. He was linked to a significant investigation known as "Dionisio," which led to the arrest of 83 individuals in eastern Sicily. Galea's role within the Santapaola clan remained significant as he continued to exert influence over the clan's criminal activities, even from behind bars.

His legal troubles continued after his initial arrest in 2006. In 2009, Galea was sentenced to 16 years in prison for mafia association. However, he was released in October 2011 after a decision by the Court of Catania regarding the terms of his detention. Shortly afterward, the Court of Appeal ruled that Galea should be re-arrested, considering that the detention conditions had not been met. As a result, he was arrested again and returned to prison to serve his sentence.
