= Francesco Ferrera =

Member of the Sicilian mafia

- Born: 1935 (age 90–91); Catania, Sicily, Kingdom of Italy
- Other name: U' cavadduzzu
- Occupation: Mafioso
- Parent: Salvatore Ferrera
- Allegiance: Catania Mafia family / Cosa Nostra

Francesco Ferrera (born 1935) is a Sicilian mafioso and a high-ranking member of the Catania Mafia family. For years, he was considered the number two in the leadership of the Catania Mafia, second only to the historical boss Nitto Santapaola.

== Family background ==
Francesco Ferrera was born in 1935 in Catania. His family, known as the Cavadduzzi, began by selling mineral water and running illegal gambling dens. Over time, with the proceeds from smuggling and drug trafficking, they expanded their wealth and influence, investing in agricultural estates, hotels, and a large portfolio of residential properties. Francesco's father, Salvatore Ferrera, married one of the "D’Emanuele sisters". The D’Emanuele sisters played a crucial role in forging strong alliances by marrying into three of Catania’s key Mafia families, the Ferrera, Santapaola, and Ercolano families. Through these marriages, they established important blood ties that helped to consolidate power and cooperation among these families. Francesco's brothers, Natale, Giuseppe “Pippo,” and Antonino “Nino” were also involved in the Mafia activities. When Nitto Santapaola emerged as the undisputed capo of the Catania Mafia family, in the late 1970s, the Cavadduzzi became the de facto second-in-command (“numeri due”). Numerous pentiti have provided detailed accounts of the Ferrera family's operations, but it was Antonino Calderone, brother of the murdered Catania Mafia boss Pippo Calderone, who first broke the silence. Calderone had worked alongside the Ferrera family in managing Catania's Mafia affairs from the 1960s through the 1980s. He described the Ferreras as “smart and determined people,” part of a family that “raced to produce male heirs,” and emphasized their close blood ties to the Santapaolas.

== Criminal career ==
In the spring of 1962, Francesco Ferrera was formally inducted into the Mafia alongside Benedetto Santapaola and Giuseppe Ferlito, uncle of the future boss Alfio Ferlito. In 1963, he was first arrested for the murder of Carmelo Mirabella. Represented by lawyer Giovanni Leone, who later became President of the Italian Republic, Ferrera was sentenced to 16 years in prison. However, a higher court later acquitted him, ruling that he had acted out of necessity. Ferrera survived an assassination attempt in 1982 during a violent conflict between the Santapaola faction and the Alfio Ferlito faction within the Catania Mafia family, this violent conflict culminated in the infamous Circonvallazione massacre, where Ferlito and the carabinieri escorting him were murdered. Ferrera was wanted under six separate arrest warrants.

The first was issued in 1983 by Rome prosecutors for drug trafficking and criminal conspiracy. That same year, the Genoa prosecutor’s office issued a similar warrant. In 1984, Ferrera was named among the defendants in the Turin maxi-trial, and Palermo prosecutors also charged him with mafia association and international drug trafficking. According to investigators, Ferrera had ties with Singapore-born Chinese drug trafficker Koh Bak Kin, a key figure in the global heroin trade. In 1988, the Catania courts issued the latest warrant against Ferrera, accusing him of ordering the attempted murder of Giuseppe Alleruzzo, a boss from Paternò who had begun cooperating with authorities. This attack took place in Pianosa prison on October 7, 1986. In October 1990, Catania police raided Ferrera's home, but he was not present. However, they discovered 170 million lire in cash and three bearer savings books totaling nearly half a billion lire. This discovery launched a wide-ranging investigation into money laundering.

=== Arrest ===
On September 14, 1991, Francesco Ferrera was arrested in Brussels, Belgium. He was walking calmly along Avenue du Parc, one of the city’s most elegant streets, carrying one million Belgian francs in his pocket. At 2:35 PM, an officer and two non-commissioned officers of the Italian Carabinieri, who had been tracking him for a month, apprehended him with the assistance of a Belgian Gendarmerie official. The area had been secured in advance, and upon seeing the Italian officers, Ferrera understood that his long time on the run had finally come to an end.
