= Andrea Nizza =

Member of the Sicilian mafia

Andrea Nizza (born 1986) is a Sicilian mafioso who emerged as a prominent figure as the leader of the Nizza faction, a subgroup within the powerful Catania Mafia family, in which he served as its armed wing and also ran an extensive drug trafficking operation with international links.

== Criminal career ==
Born in Catania, Sicily in 1986, Andrea Nizza’s criminal trajectory reflects a rapid rise to power following the incarceration of his older brothers, Fabrizio, Daniele, and Giovanni, who had previously dominated the drug trade in the city. By the mid-2000s, Andrea was already operating his own drug distribution point in Viale Moncada 10, located in the Librino district of Catania, and sourcing large quantities of narcotics through transnational contacts, especially from Albanian traffickers. His involvement was not limited to drug trafficking but extended to extortion, illegal arms possession, and mafia-related violence. According to judicial sources, he shared drug revenues with his brother Fabrizio, allocating the remaining funds to legal expenses, inmate support, and operational reinvestments.

After his conviction in the “Fiori Bianchi” operation in 2014, Andrea Nizza went into hiding, eluding authorities for over two years. Despite being a fugitive, he maintained control over his organization, reinforcing his leadership through violence, intimidation, and strategic alliances, including with former rivals such as the Arena group. His command extended across Catania’s neighborhoods of Librino, San Cristoforo, and San Giovanni Galermo, each a vital hub in the regional drug trade. Investigators estimated that the group's daily drug revenue reached up to €80,000, generating up to €2.5 million per month. These profits were used to finance additional drug purchases, support incarcerated members, and invest in commercial enterprises, all while bolstering the Nizza faction’s autonomy and influence within Cosa Nostra.

In January 2017, Andrea Nizza was apprehended by the Carabinieri in a well-equipped villa in Viagrande, on the outskirts of Catania. At the time of his arrest, he was found with his pregnant wife, two children, and two accomplices who were later charged with aiding a fugitive. He was placed under the strict 41-bis prison regime. His capture was the culmination of extensive surveillance and technical investigations. It marked a significant blow to the Nizza faction and was part of a broader crackdown that had already led to over 60 arrests since 2015 through operations such as “Carthago.”

Andrea’s downfall was further accelerated by a wave of defections within the clan, including that of his once-loyal driver, Davide Seminara, and most notably, his brother Fabrizio, who became a state witness. Their testimonies provided prosecutors with detailed insights into the clan’s drug routes, military structures, and extortion schemes, and even implicated Andrea in acts of homicide. The betrayal from within significantly undermined Andrea’s credibility and authority, hastening the erosion of the criminal network he had built.
