= Vincenzo Romeo =

Member of the Sicilian mafia

- Born: 19 May 1979 (age 47); Messina, Sicily, Italy
- Occupation: Mafioso
- Parent(s): Francesco Ciccio Romeo; Concetta Santapaola
- Status: Imprisoned
- Allegiance: Catania Mafia family / Cosa Nostra
- Penalty: 15 years

Vincenzo Romeo (born 19 May 1979) is a Sicilian mafioso, considered by the authorities as the capo of the Messina faction of the powerful Catania Mafia family.

Before his 2017 arrest, Vincenzo Romeo was regarded as one of the leading representatives of a new generation within the Cosa Nostra, embodying a shift toward more discreet and business-oriented criminal models.

== Criminal career ==
Vincenzo Romeo was born in Messina and is the son of Francesco “Ciccio” Romeo, a well-known mobster from the city and former 41 bis inmate, who played a key role in establishing ties between the Catania Mafia family and the criminal underworld of Messina by marrying Concetta Santapaola, sister of the historic capo Nitto Santapaola. Under this alliance, a new, less violent mafia model emerged, deeply integrated into the legitimate economy. Vincenzo Romeo inherited this legacy, standing at the center of the faction’s leadership.

Romeo took over the leadership and day-to-day operations of the family, although he continued to consult closely with his father on major decisions. Portrayed as an educated, well-connected businessman who could navigate high-level financial circles while still resorting to violence when needed, he is considered by numerous pentiti as highly respected within the Messina underworld and is seen as one of the most serious and dependable young figures within the Catania Mafia family. His alliances extend across Italy’s major criminal organizations, including the powerful 'Ndrine of Platì and Cirò Marina, the Sacra Corona Unita from Apulia, and representatives of crime groups operating in Lombardy and Emilia-Romagna.

Vincenzo Romeo wasn’t just involved in the usual Mafia operations, he also played a significant role in businesses like construction, waste management, and real estate development around Messina. Because he was trusted within the organization, he often stepped in to help settle financial disputes, including long-standing debts between major mafia families. His involvement helped ease tensions and reduce the threat of violence against some local business owners.

=== Arrest ===
Vincenzo Romeo was arrested in July 2017 during Operation Beta, which uncovered Cosa Nostra’s presence in the city of Messina. Seen as the leader of Cosa Nostra in Messina, he was convicted in October 2018 on several charges, including mafia association, extortion, illegal gambling, and money laundering. He received a sentence of 15 years and 2 months. After the trial, he was placed in solitary confinement under the strict 41-bis prison regime.
