= Giuseppe Pulvirenti =

Sicilian mafioso

Giuseppe Pulvirenti (30 july 1933 – 2 February 2009) was a Sicilian mafioso who rose to prominence within the Catania Mafia family and was a close associate and trusted lieutenant of Benedetto Santapaola, one of the most influential mafia leaders in Sicily.

== History ==
Giuseppe Pulvirenti, also known as "U malpassotu", was born in Belpasso, a town located on the slopes of Mount Etna. Characterized physically as stocky, with an unkempt beard, shaved head, and a weary demeanor, Pulvirenti led a life steeped in violence and criminal enterprise. During the 1990s, he actively participated in a bloody internal mafia feud that claimed around one hundred lives per year. His criminal activities spanned extortion, murder, drug trafficking, and political corruption. Notably, he orchestrated a large-scale electoral manipulation scheme in 1991 involving multiple political figures, including members of the Italian Republican Party and Christian Democracy.

After eleven years in hiding, Pulvirenti was arrested in 1993 during the "Operazione Mito" while concealed in a 16-square-meter underground bunker in the countryside of Belpasso. The bunker, hidden beneath a trapdoor, was equipped with basic living amenities, a radio tuned to police frequencies, a firearm, and cash. Upon arrest, he was found wearing a gold Rolex, a lion-head necklace, and a ring with twelve diamonds surrounding a ruby, believed by informants to symbolize the leadership of twelve mafia districts.

Following his arrest, Pulvirenti chose to collaborate with the authorities. His decision was reportedly influenced by a desire to rebuild his life with a nurse with whom he had a child. His cooperation led to multiple anti-mafia operations and unveiled extensive collusion between the mafia and political entities. This decision cost him personal relationships; he was abandoned by his wife and children and later denied a divorce when he attempted to formalize his relationship with his long-time mistress.

In his later years, Pulvirenti lived under a secret identity in Cerveteri, near Rome, where he worked modestly as a night watchman at a playground. Despite his criminal past, he remained unrecognized by the local community. On February 2, 2009, he died at the age of 79 in a traffic accident while driving his three-wheeled Ape vehicle, symbolic of his humble post-criminal life. His death revealed the quiet, inconspicuous existence of a man who was once a feared figure in the Sicilian underworld.
