= Vincenzo Santapaola =

Member of the Sicilian mafia (1969–2026)

- Born: 2 June 1969; Catania, Sicily, Italy
- Died: 21 May 2026 (aged 56); Parma, Italy
- Other names: "Enzo" Santapaola "'U fantasma" (The Ghost)
- Occupation: Mafioso
- Parent(s): Benedetto Santapaola; Carmela Minniti
- Status: Deceased (imprisoned from 2012)
- Allegiance: Catania Mafia family, Cosa Nostra
- Criminal charge: Murder
- Penalty: 30 years

Vincenzo Santapaola (Italian pronunciation: [vinˈtʃɛntso santaˈpaːola]; 2 June 1969 – 21 May 2026) was a Sicilian mafioso, considered by the authorities as the official boss of the Catania Mafia family.

== Biography ==
=== Family background and early life ===
Vincenzo Santapaola, commonly known as "Enzo," was the eldest son of Benedetto Santapaola, a notorious Mafia figure from Catania, Sicily, and Carmela Minniti, who came from a middle-class family. Born into one of the most influential Mafia families within Cosa Nostra, Vincenzo’s life was shaped from an early age by the Mafia’s violent code of conduct and deep-rooted presence in Sicily’s criminal landscape. In 1978, his father became the head of the Catania Mafia clan and his criminal empire spanned several decades, marked by ruthless tactics and an unyielding grip on power in the area.

Growing up, Vincenzo was immersed in the complex world of organized crime, learning from a young age the dynamics of Mafia life. His mother, Carmela, strongly opposed Vincenzo and his siblings becoming involved in that world. She dreamed of a different future for them and made deliberate efforts to distance them from their father’s criminal environment, enrolling them in private schools frequented by Catania’s upper class. Despite her intentions, the overwhelming influence of the Santapaola legacy proved difficult to escape. Vincenzo's involvement with Cosa Nostra was almost inevitable, as his father’s influence and reputation placed him at the centre of the Mafia's operations. Vincenzo also has a younger brother, Francesco, who would later become entangled in the same criminal network. This family dynamic created a foundation that would see both brothers play significant roles in the Mafia’s activities in Sicily.

=== 1990s, criminal activities and arrests ===
Santapaola's involvement in criminal activities began to take shape during the early 1990s, a period of intense internal strife within Cosa Nostra. In December 1992, Vincenzo was arrested alongside his brother Francesco during a large-scale operation targeting Mafia figures. However, after an appeal, both were released from custody. Despite this temporary setback, Vincenzo’s criminal activities continued unabated, and he was soon re-arrested in 1993 as part of Operation "Orsa Maggiore".

The operation "Orsa Maggiore" was a key investigation aimed at uncovering the power struggles within Cosa Nostra, especially between the Corleonesi Mafia clan and the Catania Mafia family. Vincenzo’s connection to this conflict, along with his association with his father’s criminal dealings, marked him as a central figure in Mafia affairs. He was later released but soon faced further legal troubles.

On 1 September 1995, Vincenzo's mother, Carmela Minniti, was murdered in her luxurious apartment located in the Cerza area of San Gregorio, on the outskirts of Catania. Giuseppe Ferone, a former ally of the Santapaola family, shot her multiple times, driven by a desire for revenge against Benedetto "Nitto" Santapaola.

In 1999, Vincenzo was arrested again during the investigation known as "Orione 2," which sought to expose the escalating tensions between the factions of Cosa Nostra. This investigation highlighted the growing division within the Mafia, particularly between Riina's loyalists and Provenzano's loyalists. Vincenzo’s involvement in these struggles underscored his position as a key player within the Catania Mafia, though he was ultimately released from detention after a period of imprisonment. Throughout the 1990s and early 2000s, Vincenzo’s arrests continued, with multiple detentions and releases, showcasing his integral role in the Mafia while navigating the law enforcement efforts aimed at dismantling his family’s criminal activities.

=== The murder of Angelo Santapaola (2007) ===
One of the most significant and shocking events tied to Vincenzo Santapaola was the murder of his cousin, Angelo Santapaola, in 2007. This murder, which would later be central to his conviction, was a brutal act of violence that reflected the deep divisions within the Santapaola family itself. Angelo, who had started to diverge from the family’s leadership and had attempted to make his own way in the criminal world, was seen as a threat by Vincenzo. Tensions within the family had reached a breaking point, and Vincenzo ordered the elimination of Angelo, seeing him as an obstacle to maintaining control over the family’s criminal operations.

The murder of Angelo Santapaola, along with his bodyguard, Nicola Sedici, was carried out in a gruesome manner. Their bodies were discovered in a slaughterhouse in Ramacca, where they had been subjected to the brutal technique of “lupara bianca", which is often used by the Mafia to make bodies disappear. The remains were burned and discarded, leaving little evidence behind. However, investigations eventually pointed to Vincenzo as the mastermind behind the killing.

Santapaola's role in this murder was revealed through the testimonies of several Mafia informants, including Francesco Squillaci, known as “Martiddina,” who had previously been involved with Cosa Nostra but later cooperated with the authorities. Squillaci’s cooperation with the prosecution played a critical role in exposing Vincenzo’s involvement. Despite being identified as the instigator of the murder, Vincenzo was acquitted of the charges related to Nicola Sedici’s death.

=== 2012 arrest ===
In 2012, Santapaola was arrested by the Carabinieri's ROS unit in Catania as part of the "Iblis" investigation into alleged connections between the mafia, business, and politics. Initially evading capture during the operation on 3 November 2010, Santapaola remained a fugitive while legal proceedings continued. Although the Court of Review initially annulled the arrest order, the Catania Prosecutor’s Office appealed to the Court of Cassation, which overturned the decision and referred the matter to a different panel. The new court confirmed the need for precautionary custody, reinstating the arrest order, which was then executed by the authorities.

=== Trial and sentence ===
The murder of Angelo Santapaola was central to the “Thor” trial, a major legal proceeding that examined decades of Mafia-related violence, including vendettas, murders, and internal Mafia power struggles. The trial, which included a number of other key figures from the Catania Mafia family, brought to light the full extent of the family's criminal activities.

Santapaola was initially sentenced to life imprisonment for orchestrating the murder of his cousin, Angelo. However, the Court of Appeals later reduced his sentence to 30 years, following an agreement between the parties. The conviction was based on testimonies from Mafia informants, including Santo La Causa and Francesco Squillaci, who identified Vincenzo as the mastermind behind the killings. The court found Vincenzo guilty of ordering the murder, but acquitted him of responsibility for the destruction of Angelo’s body.

The trial, which involved multiple defendants, revealed the deep ties between the Santapaola family and other Mafia figures in Sicily. Among the individuals convicted were other members of the Mafia, including Natale Filloramo, a relative of the Santapaola family, and Orazio Magrì, the hitman involved in the murders. Filloramo was sentenced to life imprisonment for his role in the killings, while Magrì received a lesser sentence, with his cooperation in the trial leading to a reduction of his sentence. The trial also saw the convictions of several other Mafia figures, including notorious members of the Catania Mafia, who were involved in various crimes ranging from drug trafficking to murder. As part of the legal process, several Mafia informants, or "pentiti," provided crucial testimony, helping to piece together the events that led to the killings and the operations of the Santapaola family.

=== Media controversy and legal struggles ===
In 2008, Vincenzo Santapaola attempted to make his case known to the public by sending an open letter from prison to a local newspaper, La Sicilia. In the letter, Vincenzo expressed his desire to lead a life free from the criminal world, painting himself as an individual seeking redemption. He argued that he was unjustly held in the 41-bis regime, a strict form of imprisonment for high-profile Mafia figures. The letter, however, raised concerns among legal experts and journalists. Critics pointed out that the newspaper had published the letter without providing context about Vincenzo's criminal background, which many viewed as a violation of journalistic ethics.

The letter, which omitted any reference to Vincenzo’s notorious criminal past and the violent acts he had committed, was seen by some as a deliberate attempt to present a sanitized version of his life. The publication of the letter sparked debates about the responsibility of the media when dealing with individuals involved in organized crime, especially those with such a violent history. In particular, the lack of any mention of Vincenzo’s involvement in the murders of Angelo Santapaola and Nicola Sedici was considered a serious omission. Legal experts, including Franco Abruzzo, a former president of the Lombardy Journalists’ Association, criticized the media for not fully contextualizing the letter, stating that the public had the right to understand the full scope of Vincenzo's actions before being presented with his personal claims of innocence and suffering.

=== Detention under 41-bis and medical controversies ===
In recent years, Vincenzo Santapaola repeatedly sought a deferral of his prison sentence on medical grounds, citing severe physical ailments including paraplegia and chronic pancreatitis. His requests were consistently denied by the courts, which noted that he voluntarily discontinued the physiotherapy deemed necessary by medical experts. Additionally, his petition to explore access to assisted reproduction was dismissed as irrelevant to the matter of sentence suspension.

However, in 2021, the Supreme Court annulled a previous ruling, highlighting the prolonged suspension of therapy due to the COVID-19 pandemic and the lack of adequate medical care within the prison system. The court criticized the contradiction in affirming the theoretical adequacy of treatment while acknowledging its practical unavailability, emphasizing that incarceration must not fall below a threshold of human dignity. The case remained a point of contention regarding the treatment of seriously ill inmates under the 41-bis regime.

=== Death ===
Santapaola died on 21 May 2026, at the age of 56, in the hospital unit of the prison of Parma.
