= Giuseppe Di Cristina =

Member of the Sicilian Mafia

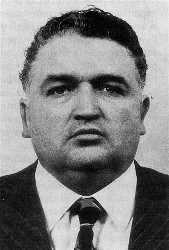
- Giuseppe Di Cristina.
- Born: April 22, 1923; Riesi, Sicily, Italy
- Died: May 30, 1978 (aged 55); Palermo, Sicily, Italy
- Cause of death: Gunshot
- Other name: “la tigre’’ (the tiger)
- Occupation: Mafia boss
- Known for: Head of the Riesi Mafia family
- Allegiance: Riesi Mafia family / Sicilian mafia

Giuseppe Di Cristina (April 22, 1923 – May 30, 1978) was a powerful mafioso from Riesi in the province of Caltanissetta, Sicily, southern Italy. Di Cristina, nicknamed “la tigre’’ (the tiger), was born into a traditional Mafia family, his father Francesco Di Cristina and his grandfather were men of honour as well.

In 1975 he became the head of Cosa Nostra in the Caltanissetta province and a member of the Interprovincial Commission of the Mafia. Three years later he was killed by a rival Mafia faction, the Corleonesi of Totò Riina and Bernardo Provenzano. His death was a prelude to the Second Mafia War, which would start in 1981 after the Corleonesi killed Stefano Bontade.

== Mafia heritage ==
Francesco ‘Don Ciccu’ Di Cristina

Di Cristina's grandfather Giuseppe Di Cristina was a giant strong man and a gabelloto – a leaseholder of an estate subletting land. When it was time to show who would succeed him, he chose the day of the procession of the saint San Giuseppe in Riesi. When the procession made a stop under Don Giuseppe's balcony he kissed his son Francesco in front of the whole procession, which was looking up waiting for the sign to proceed. Francesco ‘Don Ciccu’ Di Cristina then gave the procession the signal to continue. It was now clear to the village that Don Ciccu was the new boss.

Don Ciccu was a clever boss and developed good relationships with the Palermo Mafia families and political groups. Francesco ‘Don Ciccu’ Di Cristina died on September 13, 1961. A holy image was distributed among the population. It read: “A enemy of all injustices he showed with word and deed that his Mafia was not delinquency but respect for the law of honour”. His eldest son Giuseppe Di Cristina replaced him.

== Political connections ==
Di Cristina was known as the ‘elector’ of Calogero Volpe, an MP for Christian Democrat party (DC – Democrazia Cristiana). Giuseppe's brother Antonio Di Cristina would become the mayor of Riesi and the under-secretary of the Christian Democrat party of the Caltanissetta province. According to the pentito Antonino Calderone: “They were the bosses of the Riesi Mafia for three generations … the supported the Democrazia Cristiana, they were all DC.”

Di Cristina's best men at his marriage were Giuseppe Calderone – the Mafia boss of Catania – and Christian Democrat senator Graziano Verzotto. Verzotto was the president of the state-owned Ente Minerario Siciliano (EAS - the Sicilian Mines Authority), which was created after World War II to try to stem the crisis in the sulfur mining industry.

After he returned from an internal banishment in Turin due to the Mafia crackdown by the Italian authorities after the Ciaculli massacre in 1963, Di Cristina was made treasurer of the EAS-owned company So. Chi. Mi. Si. (Società Chimica Mineraria Siciliana), presided over by Verzotto, although he was known to the police as a mafioso and had been subject to special police measures.

Di Cristina changed sides in his political preferences because he got no support from the Christian Democrats when he was in trouble over a restraining order. Instead he turned to Aristide Gunnella from the small Italian Republican Party (PRI). In the next elections Gunnella suddenly received an avalanche of votes in comparison to what they used to get. Despite the upheaval about Gunnella's relationship with Di Cristina, he was defended by Republican Party leader Ugo La Malfa. The party could not do without one of his top vote-getters. La Malfa made Gunnella a minister of government.

The case was first exposed by the journalist Mauro De Mauro of L'Ora, who would disappear on September 17, 1970.

== Involvement in murders ==
Giuseppe Di Cristina on trial

According to the pentito Tommaso Buscetta, Di Cristina was involved in the killing of Enrico Mattei, the controversial president of the state oil company Ente Nazionale Idrocarburi (ENI) who died in a mysterious plane crash on October 27, 1962. Di Cristina's men allegedly sabotaged Mattei's plane, according to the pentito Francesco Di Carlo.

In 1970 the Sicilian Mafia Commission was reconstituted. One of the first issue that had to be confronted was an offer of prince Junio Valerio Borghese who asked for support for his plans for a neofascist coup in return for a pardon of convicted mobsters like Vincenzo Rimi and Luciano Leggio. Giuseppe Calderone and Di Cristina went to visit Borghese in Rome. Gaetano Badalamenti opposed the plan. However, the Golpe Borghese fizzled out in the night of December 8, 1970.

One of Di Cristina's most trusted men, Damiano Caruso, was allegedly one of the killers of a Mafia hit-squad dressed in a police uniforms that executed Michele Cavataio on December 10, 1969, in the Viale Lazio in Palermo as retaliation for the events during the First Mafia War in 1963. Cavataio had been fuelling the Mafia war by killing members of both the warring factions. Caruso would be killed years later in Milan by Luciano Leggio.

Di Cristina was arrested but acquitted for lack of evidence in the second Trial of the 114 in July 1974. In yet another trial in Agrigento over a vendetta between Mafia clans in Riesi and Ravanusa over a refusal to stash a load of smuggled cigarettes belonging to Di Cristina. Again all defendants, including Di Cristina, were acquitted for lack of proof in March 1974.

== Confronting the Corleonesi ==
Di Cristina was one of the first who saw the danger of the strategy of the Corleonesi of "Totò" Riina to dominate Cosa Nostra. Di Cristina clashed with the Corleonesi over the killing of Lieutenant-Colonel Giuseppe Russo of the Carabinieri on August 20, 1977. Russo, who according to the Corleonesi was a confidant of Di Cristina, was killed without the consent of the Commission, which had opposed a prior request by Totò Riina and Bernardo Provenzano.

Di Cristina understood the strategy of the Corleonesi. While the more established Mafia families in Palermo refrained from openly killing authorities because that would attract too much police attention, the Corleonesi deliberately killed to intimidate the authorities in such a way that the suspicion would fell on their rivals in the Commission.

Di Cristina became one of the main targets of the Corleonesi, just as Giuseppe Calderone. The Corleonesi were attacking the allies of the Palermo families in the other provinces to isolate men like Stefano Bontade, Salvatore Inzerillo and Gaetano Badalamenti. On November 21, 1977, Di Cristina survived a shooting, but his most loyal men Giuseppe Di Fede and Carlo Napolitano were murdered by the Corleonesi.

In January 1978, Di Cristina, together with Gaetano Badalamenti and Giuseppe Calderone, met Salvatore "Ciaschiteddu" Greco, who had arrived from Venezuela where he was living, to discuss the elimination of Francesco Madonia, head of the Vallelunga Pratameno Mafia family, who was suspected of having ordered the failed attack on Di Cristina at the instigation of Totò Riina, to whom he was closely linked; Greco, however, advised postponing any decision to a later date but, having left for Caracas, he died there prematurely of natural causes on 7 March 1978. Following Greco's death, Madonia was killed on 16 March by Di Cristina and Salvatore Pillera, sent by Giuseppe Calderone. Riina then accused Badalamenti of having ordered the murder of Madonia without authorization and put him in a minority, having him expelled from the Sicilian Mafia Commission and replaced by Michele Greco, one of his allies.

== Police informer ==
Di Cristina became more and more isolated. He decided to inform the Carabinieri about the danger of the Corleonesi. The first meeting took place on April 16, 1978. According to the Carabinieri officer who met him, Di Cristina looked like a hunted animal. Di Cristina gave a full picture of the internal division within Cosa Nostra between the Corleonesi led by Luciano Leggio and the faction of Gaetano Badalamenti and Stefano Bontade. The Corleonesi had a secret death squad of fourteen men and were infiltrating other mafia families, according to Di Cristina. He also explained the growing importance of Totò Riina and Bernardo Provenzano.

"Their criminal strategy, while crazy, has its rewards," Di Cristina told the Carabinieri. "It provokes police activity but primarily against the 'old mafiosi' who are easy to identify; it causes their terrifying prestige to grow and undermines the prestige of the 'traditional' mafia and the principles on which it depends. It attracts to them, either through fear or through the appeal of such daring undertakings, new recruits and new forces."

Di Cristina was murdered on May 30, 1978, by the Corleonesi while waiting at a bus stop. His death was a prelude to the Second Mafia War, which would start off in 1981 when the Corleonesi killed Stefano Bontade. The murder took place in the territory of Salvatore Inzerillo. That way the suspicion fell on Inzerillo and Bontade, just as Di Cristina already explained.

Thousands of people attended the funeral of Di Cristina in his hometown Riesi. The mafioso Antonio ‘Nino’ Marchese received a life sentence for the murder of Di Cristina. Several relatives of Di Cristina were also attacked by the Corleonesi in the following months. Many of the followers of Di Cristina would move to another criminal organisation, the Stidda.
