= Angelo Antonino Pipitone =

Member of the Sicilian Mafia

Angelo Antonino Pipitone

Angelo Antonino Pipitone (born 30 August 1943 in Carini, Sicily) is a member of the Sicilian Mafia from Carini near Palermo. Pipitone is the boss of the cosca of Carini and was arrested on 25 September 2014 together with his wife Franca Pellerito, his daughter Epifania and her husband Benedetto Pipitone, his cousin Francesco Marco Pipitone as well as Angela Conigliaro, who according to the investigators is loyal to the Pipitone family.
