= Santo La Causa =

Former member of the Sicilian mafia

Santo La Causa is a former Sicilian mafioso and a former high-ranking member of the Catania Mafia family, who turned state witness (pentito) in 2012 after his arrest in 2009.

== History ==
Santo La Causa, born in Catania, rose through the ranks of the Cosa Nostra to become the acting regent of the powerful Catania Mafia family. Originally active in the Canalicchio district in Catania in the early 1990s, he was first arrested for illegal possession of a firearm. Despite recurring imprisonments, he steadily climbed the hierarchy of the organization, ultimately becoming a central figure in the Mafia family's leadership structure.

La Causa was known not only for his operational involvement but also for his strategic and economic insight. He played a key role in the clan's control over public contracts and subcontracts, overseeing the selection of companies for major works such as excavation, vehicle rentals, and aggregate supplies. His approach showed an unusual awareness of the economic balance within the local business ecosystem, favoring struggling enterprises within the Catania area to maintain social control and economic dependency. This strategy, according to his later testimony, contributed to the continued social tolerance of the Mafia's presence in the region.

Between 2006 and 2009, while still under special surveillance, La Causa publicly participated in Catania's patronal Festival of Saint Agatha, even helping to carry the religious statue. According to his testimony, this presence at such a highly symbolic event was not mere devotion but a deliberate assertion of Mafia prestige. His accounts describe how members of the Santapaola clan were exclusively allowed to carry certain relics, highlighting the group's control over religious and cultural events for reputational gain.

After being released from prison in 2006 due to a legal pardon, La Causa evaded justice and became a fugitive, eventually being added to the list of most wanted fugitives in Italy. In 2009, he was arrested during a high-level Mafia summit in Catania. His legal history includes a life sentence in 2004 for the murder of Salvatore Vittorio (later overturned), a seven-year sentence for extortion in 2007, and a 25-year conviction for Mafia association in 2010.

La Causa began cooperating with authorities in the 2012, providing crucial testimony in several anti-mafia cases, including the high-profile “Iblis” investigation into ties between organized crime, politics, and business. His collaboration brought to light the internal dynamics of the Santapaola-Ercolano Mafia clan, including rivalries with other groups such as the Cappello clan, and confirmed the deep-rooted influence of Cosa Nostra in public life, religious celebrations, and economic activities. Following the start of his cooperation, La Causa was transferred from the Opera prison in Milan to a protected location.

== Testimonies as a collaborator ==
In his testimonies during the Iblis trial, Santo La Causa identified Enzo Santapaola, son of Benedetto Santapaola, as the undisputed head of the Cosa Nostra in Catania. La Causa described Santapaola as maintaining a deliberately low profile, a leadership style that drew criticism from other mafia factions, particularly the Palermo-based Lo Piccolo Mafia clan, who refused to negotiate with someone they viewed as a "ghost." Despite this reserved approach, Santapaola exerted full control over the organization.

La Causa explained that in various towns, people mistakenly believed he had replaced Benedetto Santapaola as the leader, due to his visible presence and active role. In reality, he was acting under direct instructions from Enzo Santapaola, who used him as a trusted operative and, effectively, as a front boss—a figure through whom he could exercise power while remaining in the shadows. Their relationship began in the 1990s during shared time in high-security prisons, and by 1998, Santapaola had assumed clear command of the clan. He tasked La Causa with restoring order following internal chaos and reestablishing the clan's extortion-based fund, the "bacinella."

La Causa also recounted that Santapaola ordered the murder of his cousin, Angelo Santapaola, and Nicola Sedici due to disloyalty, a directive issued with the phrase, “You know what you have to do.” Santapaola's presence alone was enough to calm concerned allies within the organization, further demonstrating his authority.
