= Aldo Ercolano =

Member of the Sicilian mafia

- Born: 14 November 1960 (age 65); Catania, Sicily, Italy
- Occupation: Mafioso
- Allegiance: Catania Mafia family / Cosa Nostra
- Criminal charges: Mafia association, multiple murder
- Penalty: Life imprisonment

Aldo Ercolano (born 14 November 1960) is an Italian mafioso, nephew and right-hand man of Benedetto Santapaola (known as Nitto), historical capo of the Catania Mafia family.

== History ==
Son of Giuseppe Ercolano, known as "u zu Pippu", and Maria Grazia Santapaola (sister of Benedetto), he is considered a prominent figure within the Catania Mafia, along with his father, his paternal uncle Salvatore (known as Turi), and his maternal uncle Benedetto Santapaola. Aldo Ercolano is the capo of the faction within the Catania Mafia known as the Ercolano clan, which was previously headed by his father, who died in 2012.

Aldo Ercolano is married to Francesca Mangion, daughter of the late Francesco Mangion, known as Cicciu u’ firraru, and sister of Giuseppe Mangion, both of whom were prominent figures in the Catania Mafia family.

Ercolano was among the perpetrators of the murder of Giuseppe Fava, as well as dozens of other homicides. In 1994, he was arrested in Desenzano del Garda, in Lombardy, where he was on vacation with his wife and children, after two years on the run, during which time he assumed leadership of the Catania Mafia family following the arrest of his uncle Nitto. He was sentenced to life imprisonment in the 1990s, a sentence upheld on appeal on 10 July 2001, and confirmed by the Corte di Cassazione on 15 November 2003. He remains incarcerated to this day.
