= Corleonesi =

Alliance of Mafia families

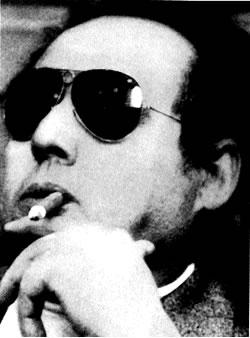
- Luciano Leggio at a 1974 court appearance
- Founded: 1970s
- Founding location: Corleone, Sicily, Italy
- Years active: 1970s–2006
- Territory: Sicily
- Activities: drug trafficking
- Rivals: Gaetano Badalamenti; Stefano Bontade; Salvatore Inzerillo; Giuseppe Calderone; Giuseppe Di Cristina and other Mafia members and families

The Corleonesi was an alliance of Mafia families within the Sicilian Mafia, formed in the 1970s. Notable leaders included Luciano Leggio, Salvatore Riina, Bernardo Provenzano, and Leoluca Bagarella from the Corleone Mafia family, Giovanni Brusca from San Giuseppe Jato, Nitto Santapaola from the Catania Mafia family, Michele Greco from the Greco Mafia clan, Giuseppe Calò from Porta Nuova, Matteo Messina Denaro from Castelvetrano, and others.

Corleonesi affiliates were not restricted to mafiosi of Corleone. The Corleonesi coalition managed to take over the Sicilian Mafia Commission and imposed a quasi-dictatorship over Cosa Nostra, waging war against rival factions (also known as the Second Mafia War) from 1981–1983. The more established Mafia families in the city of Palermo grossly underestimated the mafiosi from Corleone and often referred to the Corleonesi, in Sicilian language, as i viddani – "the peasants", or peri 'ncritati – "muddy feet". Under Riina's leadership, the Corleonesi imposed an iron grip on the Sicilian Mafia – one that would nearly prove to be its undoing.

== Affiliations and membership beyond Corleone ==
Corleonesi affiliates were not restricted to mafiosi of Corleone. The Corleone Mafia bosses initiated "men of honour", not necessarily from Corleone, whose status was kept hidden from the other members of the Corleone cosca and other Mafia families. Members of other Mafia families who sided with Riina and Provenzano were considered Corleonesi as well, forming a coalition that dominated the Mafia in the 1980s until 2006, that can be considered as a kind of parallel Cosa Nostra, according to the pentito (Mafia turncoat) Leonardo Messina. (Giovanni Brusca from the San Giuseppe Jato Mafia family was a prominent member of the Corleonesi faction for example)

The pentito Antonino Calderone provided first-hand accounts of the leaders of the Corleonesi: Luciano Leggio, Totò Riina and Bernardo Provenzano. About Leggio, Calderone said:

"He liked to kill. He had a way of looking at people that could frighten anyone, even us mafiosi. The smallest thing set him off, and then a strange light would appear in his eyes that created silence around him. When you were in his company you had to be careful about how you spoke. The wrong tone of voice, a misconstrued word, and all of a sudden that silence. Everything would instantly be hushed, uneasy, and you could smell death in the air."

"The Corleone bosses were not educated at all, but they were cunning and diabolical," Calderone said about Riina and Provenzano. "They were both clever and ferocious, a rare combination in Cosa Nostra." Calderone described Totò Riina as "unbelievably ignorant, but he had intuition and intelligence and was difficult to fathom and very hard to predict". Riina was soft spoken, highly persuasive and often highly sentimental. He followed the simple codes of the brutal, ancient world of the Sicilian countryside, where force is the only law and there is no contradiction between personal kindness and extreme ferocity. "His philosophy was that if someone's finger hurt, it was better to cut off his whole arm just to make sure," Calderone said.

Another pentito Leonardo Messina described how the Corleonesi organized their rise to power:

"They took power by slowly, slowly killing everyone ... We were kind of infatuated with them because we thought that getting rid of the old bosses we would become the new bosses. Some people killed their brother, others their cousin and so on, because they thought they would take their places. Instead, slowly, (the Corleonesi) gained control of the whole system ... First they used us to get rid of the old bosses, then they got rid of all those who raised their heads, like Pino Greco (aka Scarpuzzedda, Little shoe), Mario Prestifilippo and Vincenzo Puccio ... all that's left are men without character, who are their puppets."

== Rise to power ==
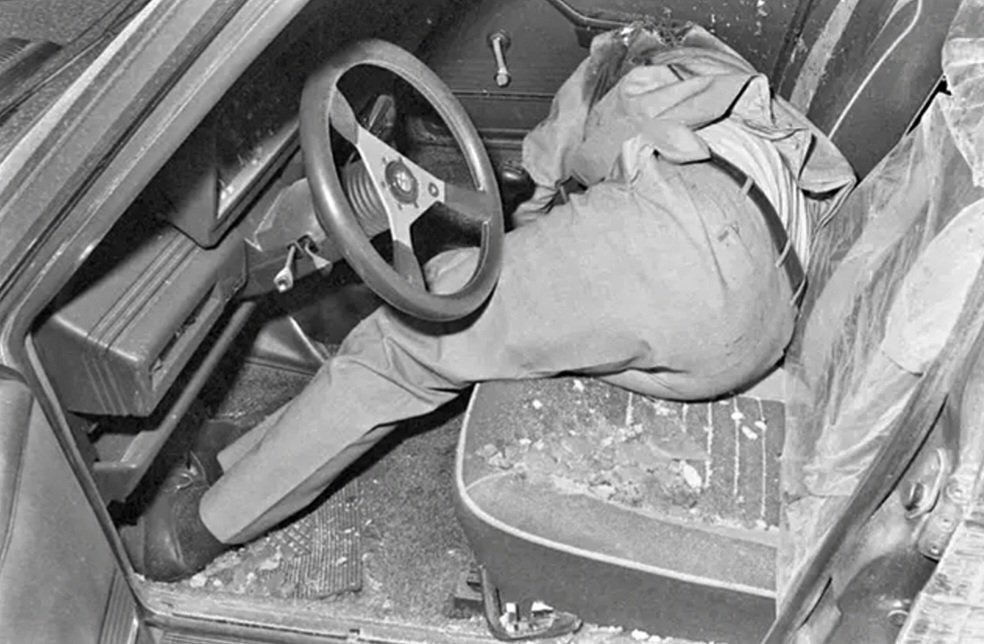
Stefano Bontade after he was shot to death with an AK-47 by Giuseppe Greco (23 April 1981)

In the 1970s, the Sicilian Mafia Commission was increasingly dominated by a coalition led by Riina and Provenzano that was opposed primarily by Gaetano Badalamenti, Stefano Bontade and Salvatore Inzerillo. Tensions between different coalitions increased. Riina and Provenzano secretly formed an alliance of mafiosi in different families, cutting across clan divisions, in defiance of the rules concerning loyalty in Cosa Nostra. This secretive inter-family group became known as the Corleonesi. The wing headed by Badalamenti and Bontade defended the existing balance of power between the single Mafia families and the Commission, while the Corleonesi tried to centralize decision making.

Amongst those who aligned themselves with the Corleonesi were Palermo bosses Giuseppe Calò (boss of Porta Nuova), Filippo Marchese (boss of Corso Dei Mille) and Rosario Riccobono (boss of Partanna Mondello). In 1977, Riina managed to have Badalamenti expelled from the Commission and subsequently exiled from the Mafia and Sicily altogether. His place was taken by Michele "The Pope" Greco, who was also aligned with Riina. Greco, like Calò, Marchese and Riccobono, kept his alliance secret from the likes of Bontade and Inzerillo. Gradually, the bosses of Palermo and their men were isolated.

Thanks to a manipulation of the rules and elimination of its most powerful rivals – in particular, the 1978 killings of Giuseppe Calderone and Giuseppe Di Cristina, members of the Interprovincial Commission – the Corleonesi coalition was able to increase its power within the Commission. Their rivals were overwhelmed and lost any power to strike back. Beside using violence, the Corleonesi also imposed their supremacy by exploiting a competence of the Commission: the power to suspend leaders of a family and to name a reggente, a temporary boss.

The conflict led to the Second Mafia War that raged from 1981 to 1983. On April 23, 1981, Bontade was machine-gunned to death in his car in Palermo and Salvatore Inzerillo, was killed three weeks later with the same Kalashnikov. The Corleonesi slaughtered the powerful families of the Palermo Mafia to take control of the organisation while waging a parallel war against Italian authorities and law enforcement to intimidate and prevent effective investigations and prosecutions.

== Parallel war against the Italian state ==
The Corleonesi faction, led by Riina, also adopted an aggressive campaign of political assassination that flagrantly broke the mafia's own rules – which required unanimous Commission approval before killing any public official. Between 1979 and 1983, they systematically eliminated roughly fifteen judges, prosecutors, and police officers who were beginning to build serious cases against the Sicilian Mafia and its heroin trade.

The targets were carefully chosen: law enforcement figures like police captain Boris Giuliano and Carabinieri captain Emanuele Basile, who were investigating heroin trafficking operations; judges like Cesare Terranova and Rocco Chinnici, who led anti-mafia investigations; and politicians who posed a reformist threat, including regional president Piersanti Mattarella and Communist Party leader Pio La Torre. The most audacious killing was that of General Carlo Alberto dalla Chiesa, the government's own high commissioner against the Mafia.

The press dubbed these victims the "excellent cadavers" – a grim phrase that captured both their prominence and the calculated ruthlessness behind their deaths. What distinguished this wave of violence was not just its scale, but its strategic logic: the Corleonesi were not reacting to threats, they were pre-emptively destroying the institutional capacity of the Italian state to fight back.

== Internal divisions and conflicts ==
In the 1990s a division emerged among the Corleonesi, following the arrest of Totò Riina on January 15, 1993. By the time of his arrest in January 1993, Riina had become a power-crazed dictator whose reign of terror eventually disgusted even some of the hard-core Corleonesi. Initially, Leoluca Bagarella, Riina's brother-in-law, took over the command of the Corleonesi, instigating a series of bombings against several tourist spots on the Italian mainland – the Via dei Georgofili bombing in Florence, Via Palestro massacre in Milan and the Piazza San Giovanni in Laterano and Via San Teodoro in Rome, which left 10 people dead and 93 injured. These attacks also caused severe damage.

Riina's arrest triggered a succession struggle between two Corleonesi rivals: Provenzano, his longtime lieutenant, and Bagarella. Provenzano moved swiftly to seize the top position, though only by agreeing to consult Bagarella before dealing with other clan leaders. The rivalry soon hardened into a deeper strategic divide – Bagarella pushing to maintain Riina's brutal campaign of violence, while Provenzano favoured a quieter, more cautious approach.

Provenzano proposed a new less violent Mafia strategy instead of the terrorist bombing campaign in 1993 against the state to get them to back off in their crackdown against the Mafia after the murders of antimafia prosecutors Giovanni Falcone and Paolo Borsellino. Provenzano's new guidelines were patience, compartmentalization, coexistence with state institutions, and systematic infiltration of public finance. Provenzano reportedly re-established the old Mafia rules that had been abolished by Riina under his very eyes when, together with Riina and Bagarella, he was ruling the Corleonesi coalition.

Giovanni Brusca – one of Riina's hitmen who personally detonated the bomb that killed Falcone, and became a state witness (pentito) after his arrest in 1996 – has offered a controversial version of the capture of Totò Riina: a secret deal between Carabinieri officers, secret agents and Cosa Nostra bosses tired of the dictatorship of Riina's faction of the Corleonesi. According to Brusca, Provenzano "sold" Riina in exchange for the valuable archive of compromising material that Riina held in his apartment in Via Bernini 52 in Palermo.

In 2002, the rift within the Corleonesi coalition became clear. On the one hand there were the hardliners in jail – led by Totò Riina and Leoluca Bagarella – and on the other the more moderate, known as the "Palermitani" – led by Bernardo Provenzano and Antonino Giuffrè, Salvatore Lo Piccolo and Matteo Messina Denaro. The incarcerated bosses wanted something to be done about the harsh prison conditions (in particular the relaxation of the 41-bis prison regime) – and were believed to be orchestrating a return to violence while serving multiple life sentences. During a court appearance in July 2002, Leoluca Bagarella suggested unnamed politicians had failed to maintain agreements with the Mafia over prison conditions. "We are tired of being exploited, humiliated, harassed and used as merchandise by political factions," he said.

Antonino Giuffrè – a close confidant of Provenzano, turned pentito shortly after his capture in April 2002 – alleges that in 1993, Cosa Nostra had direct contact with representatives of Prime Minister Silvio Berlusconi while he was planning the birth of Forza Italia. The deal that he says was alleged to have been made was a repeal of 41-bis prison regime, among other anti-Mafia laws in return for delivering electoral gains in Sicily. Giuffrè's declarations have not been confirmed. Provenzano was finally captured on 11 April 2006, by the Italian police near his home town, Corleone. After the arrest of Provenzano, the power of the Corleonesi was greatly reduced.

According to press reports, when Provenzano was moved to the high security prison in Terni, Totò Riina's son Giovanni Riina, who has been sentenced to life imprisonment for three murders, yelled that Provenzano was a "sbirro" – a popular Italian diminutive expression for a police officer – when Provenzano entered the cell block, insinuating that Provenzano cooperated with the police (maybe referring to the arrest of his father).

== Sources ==
- Arlacchi, Pino (1993). Men of Dishonor: Inside the Sicilian Mafia, New York: Morrow ISBN 0-688-04574-X
- Dickie, John (2004). Cosa Nostra. A history of the Sicilian Mafia, London: Hodder & Stoughton, ISBN 0-340-82435-2
- Follain, John (2009). The Last Godfathers: Inside the Mafia's Most Infamous Family, New York : Thomas Dunne Books ISBN 978-0-312-56690-6
- Jamieson, Alison (2000). The Antimafia: Italy's fight against organized crime, London: Macmillan, ISBN 0-333-80158-X.
- (in Italian) Lodato, Saverio (1999). Ho ucciso Giovanni Falcone: la confessione di Giovanni Brusca, Milan: Mondadori ISBN 88-04-45048-7
- Paoli, Letizia (2003). Mafia Brotherhoods: Organized Crime, Italian Style, Oxford/New York: Oxford University Press ISBN 0-19-515724-9
- Schneider, Jane T. and Peter T. Schneider, (2003). Reversible Destiny: Mafia, Antimafia, and the Struggle for Palermo, Berkeley: University of California Press ISBN 0-520-23609-2
- Stille, Alexander (1995). Excellent Cadavers. The Mafia and the Death of the First Italian Republic, New York: Vintage ISBN 0-09-959491-9
