= Catania Mafia family =

Crime family of the Sicilian mafia

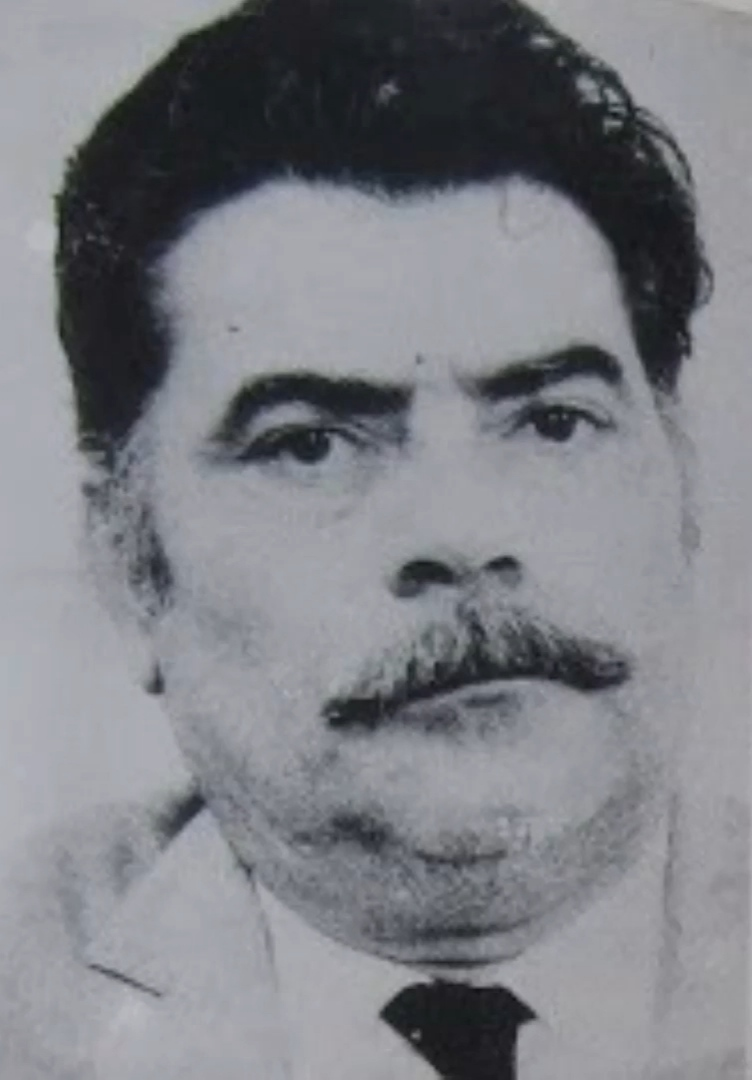
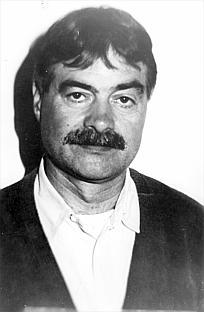
- Giuseppe Calderone Nitto Santapaola
- Founded: c.1925
- Founder: Antonino Saitta
- Founding location: Catania, Sicily
- Years active: c.1925–present
- Territory: Catania and many cities of its province, including: Aci Catena, Aci Sant'Antonio, Acireale, Adrano, Bronte, Fiumefreddo di Sicilia, Giarre, Riposto, Palagonia, Paternò, Santa Venerina, Zafferana Etnea. Their reach also extends to the city of Messina and to Malta.
- Ethnicity: Sicilians
- Activities: drug trafficking, extortion, corruption, political corruption
- Allies: The alliances shifted depending on the period, but included: Pietraperzia Mafia family Caltagirone Mafia family Ramacca Mafia family Riesi Mafia family Santa Maria di Gesù Mafia family Passo di Rigano Mafia family Casalesi clan Licciardi clan Mallardo clan De Stefano 'ndrina
- Rivals: Cappello clan Clan dei Cursoti

The Catania Mafia family, currently also referred to as the Santapaola-Ercolano Mafia clan, is a crime family of the Cosa Nostra that dominates organized crime activities in the city of Catania and its province.

The Catania Mafia quietly evolved into one of the most powerful and violent factions within the Cosa Nostra. Rooted in family ties and political connections, the organization emerged from the shadows in the mid-20th century under the leadership of Giuseppe Calderone, only to become a militarized empire under his former ally and eventual successor, Benedetto Santapaola. What began as a local effort to control gambling dens and extort businesses soon escalated into a ruthless criminal dynasty, whose influence reached deep into the economic and institutional fabric of Catania.

The Catania Mafia remains powerful, still controlled by the Santapaola-Ercolano clan. The organization has adapted to modern times, maintaining influence through extortion, drug trafficking, and infiltration of legitimate businesses. Its connections and ability to regenerate leadership make it a central player in Sicily’s criminal landscape.

== History ==
=== Origins ===
For many decades, the mafia presence in Catania was denied both by the media and public opinion. The city maintained an image of being relatively untouched by organized crime. This perception was carefully cultivated, in part due to the influence the local mafia wielded over the media, as well as their strategic alliances with business leaders and politicians.

One of the earliest documented accounts of Mafia activity in the city is the 1925 arrival in Catania of the Tagliavia family from Palermo, aiming to profit from illegal gambling operations. To do business, however, the Palermitans needed local allies. Several mafia initiations followed, and figures like Giuseppe Indelicato and Agatino Florio became men of honour.

At the time, Antonino Saitta, a native of Catania who was already a man of honour, was in prison. Upon his release, he became the first official Cosa Nostra representative in Catania. Saitta would later vanish. Reports suggest a period spent in Tunisia; others point to lupara bianca. He was succeeded by another Saitta, Luigi, who helped the Catania Mafia family get back on its feet after World War II, organizing the black market in contraband cigarettes. The bloodline would reemerge decades later, in the 1960s, with Giuseppe Calderone, the Saittas’ nephew.

During the 1950s, Cosa Nostra in Catania experienced its first internal conflict over the leadership of the local organization. Tensions culminated in the rise of Vincenzo Palermo, an old-school mobster with only one arm, who assumed control. His driver was Salvatore Santapaola, brother of Nitto Santapaola, already a man of honor at the time.

=== 1962: A key year in Catania’s mafia ===
In 1962, a pivotal shift occurred within Catania’s Cosa Nostra. Giuseppe Calderone, known as Pippo “cannarozzo d’argento” due to a vocal cord condition, was already a man of honor and served as consigliere, alongside Francesco Indelicato and Agatino “Tino ‘u vappu” Florio. The Catania's mafia leadership included Orazio Nicotra as its representative, Salvatore Torrisi as deputy, Giuseppe Indelicato as provincial head, and Salvatore Ferrera (‘u cavadduzzu) as provincial deputy, a name that would later become central in the clan’s evolution, linked by blood to the Santapaola and Ercolano families. All three families would marry into the D’Emanuele sisters, cementing a future mafia dynasty.

=== The new wave: initiations and alliances ===
That same year, Antonino Calderone, Giuseppe’s brother, was initiated. He would later become a pentito, exposing the local mafia’s structure and many details about its history. The ceremony also brought in eight others, including Nitto Santapaola, his brother Natale, cousin Francesco Ferrera, Natale Ercolano, Giuseppe Russo and Pippo Ferlito, uncle to Alfio Ferlito, a key figure in later events.

Santapaola rose quickly. Between 1966 and 1967, Calderone appointed him capodecina, replacing two aging figures. New initiates followed: Francesco Mangion, Salvatore Marchese, and Mimmo Condorelli.

=== Early 1970s and the war against the Cursoti ===
In the 1970s, Benedetto “Nitto” Santapaola began forming strategic ties with Totò Riina, a move Antonino Calderone would later call a “Corleonese strategy.” Riina officially named Santapaola head of the Catania family. As in Palermo, Cosa Nostra in Catania experienced a seismic internal shift, akin to a mafia coup.

By the early 1970s, Catania was overrun with criminal activity: robberies, smuggling, shootouts. Concerned with rising disorder, Santapaola launched a war against the Cursoti, a rival faction. Catania's Cosa Nostra had only 35 men of honor at the time, facing a much larger force. To reinforce its ranks, it initiated known gunmen, Alfio Ferlito, Salvatore Lanzafame and Salvatore “Turi Cachiti” Pillera among them. Some would later become Calderone’s closest allies.

Though initially reluctant, Calderone was drawn into the conflict. The war created deep fractures, leaving Calderone politically isolated, though his core loyalists never abandoned him.

=== 1977: Intervention and reorganization ===
By 1977, tensions in Catania had reached a boiling point. During a meeting at Prince Vanni Calvello’s villa, Michele Greco, known as Il Papa ("The Pope") for his ability to mediate between different Mafia families, intervened, dissolving the Catanese mafia family and placing it under temporary control. Greco appointed three regents: Calderone, Santapaola, and Tino Florio, known as ‘u vappu.

=== 1978: Murder of Giuseppe Calderone ===
The balance of power soon tipped. On September 8, 1978, Giuseppe Calderone was killed in an ambush in Aci Castello. His driver, Salvatore Lanzafame, survived the attack.

Calderone was ultimately betrayed by two men very close to him: Nitto Santapaola, the deputy representative of the family, and Salvatore Ferrera, the provincial representative. These two arranged a meeting for Calderone, who had taken refuge at the La Perla Jonica residence in Acireale, owned by the Costanzo brothers (important businessmen from Catania), in Aci Castello, where he was to meet with Giuseppe "Piddu" Madonia (son of Francesco, who had been assassinated on March 16 of that same year), capo of the Vallelunga Pratameno Mafia family. The meeting was prompted by the fact that some of Madonia’s men, particularly Luigi Ilardo and Giovanni Ghisena, had been seen near Calderone’s residence, and Calderone demanded an explanation.

Reassured by the fact that the meeting had been arranged by Santapaola and Ferrera, whom he trusted, Calderone, along with his driver Salvatore Lanzafame, set off for the meeting unarmed. However, during the journey, they were ambushed and struck by numerous gunshots near Aci Castello. Both Calderone and Lanzafame were seriously wounded. Calderone died in hospital three days later, while Lanzafame, despite suffering a head injury, eventually recovered. It was Lanzafame who later reconstructed the events of the ambush for Calderone’s brother, Antonino, who would later become a cooperating witness (pentito). It was subsequently revealed that among those responsible for the attack on Calderone were Luigi Ilardo, a man of honor in the Vallelunga Pratameno Mafia family and a relative of the Madonias, and Ignazio Ingrassia, known as "Boia Cani," a man of honor from the Corso dei Mille family, closely associated with Michele Greco. This collaboration among multiple families from different provinces, all linked to the Corleonesi, underscores the coordinated effort behind Calderone’s elimination.

As reported by the state witness Ciro Vara, Nitto Santapaola met with Ilardo after the killing, thereby confirming his complicity in the ambush. However, at the time, there was no concrete evidence implicating Santapaola, and the murder remained shrouded in mystery for some time and went unavenged. Only later, through the testimonies of Antonino Calderone and Ciro Vara, were the true dynamics behind the crime revealed.

The immediate consequence of Calderone’s murder was a split within the Catania mafia family. On one side were the Santapaola and Ferrera factions, supported by the Corleonesi; on the other was the group led by Alfio Ferlito and Salvatore Pillera, who were closely aligned with Calderone and his former allies, the Palermo-based mafia families of Stefano Bontade and Salvatore Inzerillo.

=== Santapaola's rule ===
Calderone’s assassination triggered a major leadership reshuffle. Nitto Santapaola took over as family representative. Francesco “Ciuzzu ‘u firraru” Mangion became his deputy. Salvatore Ferrera assumed the role of provincial representative, with Orazio Nicotra as his second. Consiglieri included Carletto Campanella, Pasquale Condorelli, and Franco Romeo, though Romeo, a businessman, was in prison at the time. He would later be murdered. His home would later reveal photos that became emblematic of Catania’s mafia-connected bourgeoisie.

Santapaola pursued a two-pronged approach: eliminating internal rivals while forging ties with Catania’s business and political elite.

During the early 1980s, Santapaola built a vast criminal empire. The period was marked by high-profile killings and public massacres. The June 6, 1981, shootout on Viale delle Olimpiadi and the April 26, 1982, massacre on Via dell’Iris left lasting scars. Months later, Alfio Ferlito was murdered in Palermo.

Despite growing attention, Santapaola moved freely in Catania. He had the power and influence to engage with politicians and entrepreneurs alike. But after being indicted for the assassination of the General Dalla Chiesa, he disappeared, remaining a fugitive.

On May 18, 1993, before dawn, Nitto Santapaola was arrested in a farmhouse in Granieri, a rural area in the Caltagirone region of Sicily. The operation was named “Operazione Luna Piena” (“Full Moon”), a nod to the nickname Santapaola had earned during his years in hiding: ‘u licantropo (the werewolf). The raid was carried out by agents from the Nucleo Operativo Centrale di Sicurezza and the Mobile Squad. Santapaola was caught asleep next to his wife, Carmela Minniti, who had remained with him throughout his years as a fugitive. Despite having a loaded pistol next to his bed, he did not attempt to resist arrest. Instead, he reportedly murmured, “Everything comes to an end,” and made a single request: to have one last breakfast with his wife before being handcuffed.

His arrest was the result of long-term intelligence work and marked the symbolic fall of a major Mafia figure. At the time of his capture, photographers captured his image, black hair, mustache, and a calm expression, as he was taken to the police headquarters in Catania. It was a stark contrast to earlier photos found at a friend’s home years prior, showing him at banquets with politicians and businessmen. Although Santapaola had long evaded justice by moving between hideouts across Sicily, including farmhouses, basements near Mount Etna, and safehouses supported by allied Mafia clans, that May morning marked the end of his flight.

Santapaola’s arrest marked the beginning of a new era for the Catania's Cosa Nostra. Yet, his legacy remains deeply rooted in the city. Decades later, his name continues to surface in judicial investigations, a reminder that his influence never fully disappeared.

=== 1990s ===
After the imprisonment of his father Nitto Santapaola, Vincenzo Santapaola assumed a more discreet leadership role in the Catania Mafia family. His position, though not widely known at the time, became clearer through the testimony of former associates like Santo La Causa, who described Vincenzo as a key figure working to restore order and organization within the clan, particularly focusing on the "bacinella" (a fund generated by extortion). Vincenzo sought to bring cohesion within the clan, dealing with internal disputes, especially with his cousin Angelo Santapaola, who had been undermining the organization. Vincenzo's leadership culminated in decisive actions, including the murder of Angelo to maintain control and authority within the family. Despite these ruthless actions, Vincenzo's leadership remained relatively low-profile, and he only revealed his involvement when necessary.

==== Ercolano faction ====
The Ercolano faction stands as one of the key players in Catania’s criminal history, closely tied to the Santapaolas. Since the 1993 arrest of Nitto Santapaola, control of the Catanese underworld has shifted back and forth between the two families, sometimes leading to bloody internal feuds.

At the heart of the Ercolano legacy is Aldo Ercolano, long considered the operational arm of Santapaola. Convicted for multiple crimes, including the 1984 assassination of anti-mafia journalist Giuseppe Fava, Aldo remains a symbol of the clan's ruthlessness. Despite his record and the high level of danger he represents, in 2019 Aldo saw the revocation of his 41-bis prison regime, a move that has drawn sharp criticism from anti-mafia investigators and watchdogs. Even behind bars, sources say, his command over the family remains unbroken.

More recently, Vincenzo “Enzo” Ercolano, Aldo’s nephew, has been identified as the family’s emerging face. With deep roots in both bloodlines and business, Enzo allegedly transformed his logistics company, Geotrans, into a mafia-backed operation. Although previously acquitted in various trials, he was sentenced to 15 years for mafia association in 2022. Wiretaps and investigations have painted a picture of a man who used intimidation and mafia leverage to monopolize produce transport between Sicily and mainland Italy, often operating in tandem with powerful Camorra groups.

Authorities also uncovered attempts to bypass state controls through the creation of a new transport cooperative, allegedly set up to sidestep the seizure of Geotrans. Despite the state's efforts, Enzo reportedly continued managing operations behind the scenes, ensuring business flowed through loyal proxies.

The Ercolano-Santapaola alliance reach extends far beyond business: they dominate neighborhoods, resolve disputes with violence, and maintain a structure that has proven incredibly resilient, even when its leaders are jailed.

=== Romeo faction ===
For years, law enforcement considered organized crime in Messina to be fragmented and lacking strong mafia leadership. Until 2014, authorities believed the city no longer had deep mafia roots. However, this view overlooked the discreet but influential presence of the Santapaola family. Natale Santapaola, brother of Nitto Santapaola, had moved to Messina and established a new local branch of the family. Francesco "Ciccio" Romeo, a known mafioso from Messina and former inmate under the 41-bis prison regime, married into the Santapaola family, strengthening ties between Messina and the Catanese Mafia. Together, they developed a new mafia model, less violent and more integrated into the legitimate economy. Investigations began when the Carabinieri tracked the Santapaola family's economic activities. Although initial surveillance revealed no explicit crimes, it exposed a vast business network: construction companies, betting shops, public health suppliers, and real estate investments. The organization resembled an economic holding rather than a traditional mafia clan, with strong connections to politics, business, and Freemasonry.

At the center of the Romeo faction's leadership is Vincenzo Romeo, son of Francesco, portrayed as an educated, well-connected businessman who could navigate high-level financial circles while still resorting to violence when needed. He partnered with businessman Biagio Grasso and became an undercover shareholder in major infrastructure projects through the company Demoter. Despite avoiding traditional extortion, the group still used violence strategically. One incident involved Vincenzo Romeo assaulting a supplier who had stopped deliveries, while another saw him confronting Calabrian extortionists attempting to intimidate a local business. In 2017, the Beta Operation uncovered the entire system, leading to numerous high-profile arrests. Judge Salvatore Mastroeni described this mafia as an "invisible bubble" that controlled the city covertly, outsourcing violence to street gangs. He argued that this marked a shift in organized crime, where partnerships with business and political elites were replacing classic intimidation-based structures. Investigators also found evidence of mafia influence over local elections.

According to Italian anti-mafia investigations, Vincenzo Romeo sought to capitalize on Malta’s deregulated online gambling environment as a conduit for laundering illicit funds. In April 2015, he traveled to Malta carrying €38,000 in cash, allegedly to establish illegal betting operations in collaboration with a poker event organizer linked to the online betting brand Planetwin365. Romeo aimed to create unlicensed online gambling sites that could be accessed from betting centers in Sicily, circumventing Italian state controls. Malta, having cultivated its reputation as a haven for online gambling since 2004, provided a regulatory framework that was both attractive and exploitable to criminal networks. These networks often operated through layers of opaque corporate structures and fiduciary services, sometimes managed by former Maltese gaming regulators, to obscure beneficial ownership. This arrangement enabled illicit cash flows through untraceable pooled accounts, facilitating large-scale money laundering for Mafia operations. A portion of the illicit funds was funneled back to Malta to maintain the operation.

Investigations by Italian anti-mafia authorities, notably Operations Doppio Gioco and Gaming Offline, revealed that the Santapaola Mafia family has played a central role in transnational criminal activities, with Malta emerging as a strategic hub for its illicit operations. These investigations showed how the Santapaolas leveraged Maltese-registered companies and unauthorized online betting platforms to facilitate extensive tax evasion and money laundering schemes. One such operation involved the website Raisebet24, through which over €30 million in taxes were evaded and more than €62 million laundered via property and business acquisitions. The clan’s criminal network extended to individuals based in Malta, where cash was smuggled from Sicily and funneled into local companies controlled by associates such as Carmelo Rosario Raspante. Italian authorities also identified Nicola Orazio Romeo as the principal individual responsible for advancing the interests of the Santapaolas in Malta. Furthermore, a 2021 operation by Catania police reaffirmed the clan’s use of Maltese entities to conduct illegal online gambling and betting, solidifying its presence in the island’s underground economy.

== 2000s-present day ==
In 2010, Italian authorities uncovered a criminal alliance between the Casalesi clan of the Camorra and the Santapaolas, forming what investigators describe as a price-fixing cartel in the fruit and vegetable transport sector across Central and Southern Italy. In a major operation led by the Caserta police and Naples’ Anti-Mafia Directorate, around 60 individuals were arrested, including key members of the Camorra's Casalesi, Licciardi, and Mallardo clans, as well as the Santapaola clan. Among those detained was Giuseppe Ercolano, brother-in-law of boss Nitto Santapaola and head of the transport company allegedly at the center of the scheme. The investigation revealed that the criminal network imposed a monopoly on the transport of produce, particularly from the Fondi market, one of Europe’s largest, forcing traders to use a single Sicilian company managed by Ercolano. The operation also led to the arrest of Paolo Schiavone, son of imprisoned boss Francesco Schiavone, during his honeymoon cruise.

In 2024, Italian anti-mafia authorities have confiscated assets worth €100 million linked to the Santapaola-Ercolano clan in Catania. The seizure dismantled a vast business empire built by Antonino and Carmelo Paratore, father and son, who led one of the most prominent entrepreneurial groups in eastern Sicily. Their operations spanned multiple sectors, including hospital cleaning services, real estate, and waste management, the latter being their primary activity. The confiscation order targeted 14 companies, 8 properties, and various financial assets, all now under state control. The Paratores were also placed under special surveillance, with a three-year residency restriction. Investigators confirmed long-standing ties between the Paratore family and mafia boss Maurizio Zuccaro, a key figure in the Santapaola-Ercolano clan currently serving a life sentence. Their close relationship, evidenced by family events like baptisms and weddings, was recognized by judges as instrumental in the Paratores’ rise from modest beginnings to considerable wealth and influence in the region.

According to police investigations that came to light in September 2024, Francesco Russo, identified as the current acting boss of the Santapaola-Ercolano mafia clan, is believed to be managing the clan's extortion operations. According to a court ruling, Russo issued direct orders related to extortion, showing his leadership role. Wiretaps confirmed that he is the one in charge, often referred to as "Ciccio Russo" in conversations among the Mafia clan members. In one intercepted conversation, mafia members discuss extorting a Japanese restaurant chain in Biancavilla, with Russo authorizing the collection of money even from locations not directly controlled by the Mafia clan. Russo also authorized extortion attempts on individuals like Aldo “u buttafuori,” a bouncer protected by a rival clan (the Cappello clan), showing the mafia's influence over employment in nightclubs. When questioned by Francesco Massimiliano Santapaola, son of Nitto Santapaola, about these actions, Daniele Strano, acting on Russo's orders, explained he was merely following instructions from high-ranking figures. The exchange highlights internal tensions and how territorial boundaries are strictly enforced within the mafia structure.

In 2025, a large-scale anti-mafia operation carried out by prosecutors in Catania and Messina exposed a vast criminal network run by the Cappello-Cintorino and Santapaola clans, deeply entrenched in drug trafficking, extortion, and territorial control across Sicily’s Ionian coast. The investigation, spanning from 2020 to 2022, led to the arrest of 39 individuals and identified 65 suspects in total. Authorities revealed that this area, particularly Giardini Naxos, Taormina, and Calatabiano, had become a strategic hub for narcotics distribution, with the mafia operating a continuous flow of drugs from Catania and using secret storage sites, including a cemetery in Giarre. Over 140 kg of drugs were seized during the investigation, including marijuana, hashish, and cocaine, along with a large number of weapons. The clans also enforced systematic extortion across the region, targeting entrepreneurs, hotel owners, shopkeepers, and even boat tour operators in the highly touristic area of Isola Bella. Victims who refused to comply faced violent retaliation, such as arson attacks and home invasions. Key figures identified include Riccardo Pedicone, associated with the Cappello clan and operating under the cover of legitimate businesses in Messina, and Filippo Christopher Cintorino, linked to the Santapaola network and the grandson of a known mafia boss. The organization exhibited a flexible, resilient structure capable of replacing leadership quickly after arrests. The investigation also uncovered attempts by the mafia to influence local politics, with documented efforts by clan members to support a candidate in the 2022 regional elections, though no formal charges of vote-buying were filed.

== Historical leadership ==
- c.1925–1940s — Antonio Saitta
- 1940s–1950s — Luigi Saitta
- c.1950s — Vincenzo Palermo
- c.1960s — Orazio Nicotra
- 1960s–1978 — Giuseppe Calderone — murdered on September 8, 1978.
- 1978–1993 — Nitto Santapaola — imprisoned in 1993.
- 1993–1994 — Vincenzo Aiello — imprisoned in 1994.
- 1994–1995 — Eugenio Galea — imprisoned in 1995.
- 1995–1998 — Sebastiano Cannizzaro — imprisoned in 1998.
- 1998–2026 — Vincenzo Santapaola — imprisoned.
  - Acting 1998—2020s — Vincenzo “Enzo” Ercolano.
  - Acting 2020s–present — Francesco Ciccio Russo.
