= Antonino Calderone =

Member of the Sicilian Mafia

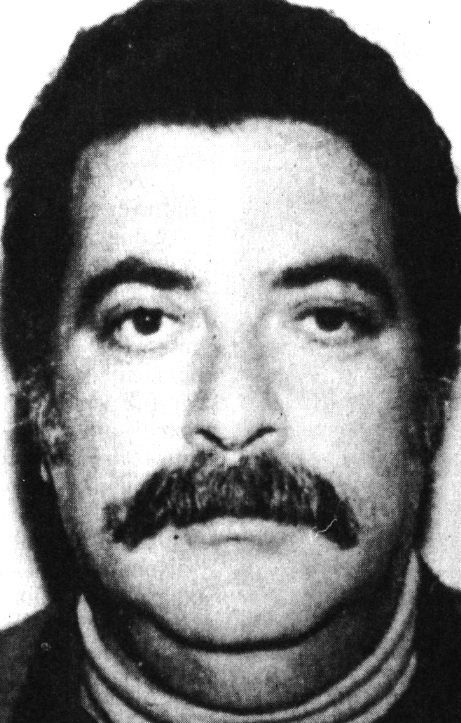
- Catania Mafia boss and pentito Antonino Calderone, 1986
- Born: 24 October 1935; Catania, Sicily, Kingdom of Italy
- Died: 10 January 2013 (aged 77); Secret overseas hideout
- Known for: Testimony as state witness pentito
- Parent(s): Salvatore Calderone; Giuseppa Saitta
- Allegiance: Catania Mafia family / Cosa Nostra

Antonino Calderone (24 October 1935 – 10 January 2013) was a Sicilian Mafioso who turned state witness (pentito) in 1987 after his arrest in 1986.

Antonino was born in Catania, the brother of Giuseppe Calderone, the boss of the local Mafia. Antonino's memoirs, Men of Dishonor: Inside the Sicilian Mafia, were published in 1992 with Antimafia sociologist Pino Arlacchi and are considered a handbook for understanding Cosa Nostra and the life of a mafioso. It was translated into many languages.

== Mafia career ==
According to Antonino Calderone, the first Mafia family in Catania was started by Antonio Saitta, in 1925. He had been prosecuted by Mussolini’s Iron Prefect, Cesare Mori. One of his daughters was the mother of Giuseppe and Antonino Calderone. Another uncle had helped the Mafia get back on its feet after World War II, organizing the black market in contraband cigarettes.

Antonino Calderone, narrating his initiation ritual in Catania in 1962, recalls that he was surprised to see at the gathering people he knew and he never suspected were in the Mafia, and not to see people he thought were in the organization. Calderone owned a gas station and entered profitable business ventures thanks to his Mafia connections, and rose through the ranks of the Calderone family until he became underboss of the Catania Mafia.

On 8 September 1978, his brother and boss of the Catania Mafia, Giuseppe Calderone, was killed by his former close friend and protégé Nitto Santapaola. Santapaola had forged an alliance with the Corleonesi and took over the command of the Catania Mafia Family. This was the beginning of a campaign of violence targeting the established Sicilian Mafia families which culminated in the 1981 killing of Stefano Bontade, a close ally and personal friend of the Calderone brothers, which led to the Second Mafia War.

Calderone became more and more marginalized and decided to leave Catania in 1983 fearing for his life. With his wife and three children, he moved to Nice in France, where he ran a Laundromat. On 9 May 1986, he was arrested in Nice.

== Pentito ==
While he was in the Nice prison, Calderone became convinced that he was about to be killed by other Sicilian inmates. Suddenly, he began screaming for a prison guard and demanded to see the head of the prison. He said he wanted to talk to judge Giovanni Falcone. Calderone was moved to an insane asylum for his own protection.

On 9 April 1987, Falcone – together with French prosecutor Michel Debaq sat face to face with Calderone in a Marseille prison. After an initial refusal to talk, Calderone suddenly said, "I know a lot about the Mafia, because I am a member of it." Once he started, Calderone talked for almost a year.

Falcone flew once a week to Marseille, taking some 1,000 pages of deposition from Calderone. Calderone proved to be a remarkably accurate witness. More than 800 details were checked. On 10 March 1988, Falcone issued 160 arrest warrants on the basis of the testimony of Antonino Calderone.

== Mafia in Catania ==
While previous pentiti had all been from Palermo, Calderone described the grip of Cosa Nostra in Catania, the main city and industrial centre on Sicily's east coast. He testified about the relationship between the Mafia and the four Cavalieri del Lavoro (Knights of Labour) of Catania: the construction entrepreneurs Carmelo Costanzo, Francesco Finocchiaro, Mario Rendo and Gaetano Graci – who needed the mafiosi for protection. Construction sites of rival companies were bombed and at least one rival of Costanzo was assassinated.

Calderone also talked about the links of Cosa Nostra with law enforcement, freemasonry, judges and politicians in Catania and the Italian government. "We in Catania, when we had a problem with the judiciary, we would turn to the local Masonic head. We knew that many magistrates were lodge members and that, thanks to the local chief, we could even interfere with ongoing criminal proceedings," Calderone said.

The Catanese Mafia was generally able to learn about arrest warrants before they were issued and sometimes had names crossed off the list. When they needed a false passport they turned to ‘their’ member of parliament in Rome, Giuseppe Lupis of the small Democratic Socialist Party. Lupis was one of the top vote-getters in Catania.

According to Calderone, the late 1970s were a turning point in the relationship between the Mafia and politics. The Mafia started to feel superior and politicians could not refuse requests for favours.

== Testimonies ==
Calderone was different from previous pentiti such as Tommaso Buscetta and Salvatore Contorno. While they expressed no regret for their crimes, Calderone seemed to suffer from genuine remorse.

As the brother of a Commission member, Calderone knew a lot about the workings of Cosa Nostra and confirmed the essential role of the Commission in the major assassinations of the 1970s and 1980s. He provided first-hand accounts of the leaders of the Corleonesi, Luciano Leggio, Totò Riina and Bernardo Provenzano. "The Corleone bosses were not educated at all, but they were cunning and diabolical," Calderone said about Riina and Provenzano. "They were both clever and ferocious, a rare combination in Cosa Nostra."

One of the more bizarre anecdotes Calderone related in his memoirs was that of Riina giving a tearful eulogy at the funeral of his murdered brother, even though Riina himself had ordered the killing. Yet, Riina's admiration for Giuseppe Calderone might have been sincere: he regretted having to have him killed, just as a president of a company regrets having to lay off a valued employee during difficult economic times.

Calderone’s most explosive revelation was about Salvo Lima, prime minister Giulio Andreotti’s chief lieutenant in Sicily, and the Salvo cousins, wealthy tax collectors on the island. He described how he and his brother conferred with Lima and the Salvo cousins to get a zealous police officer in Catania transferred.

== 'Mafia analyst' ==
Calderone testified in numerous trials, among others in the Maxi Trial appeals and in the trial against Giulio Andreotti. In 1992 he published a book with Antimafia sociologist Pino Arlacchi about his life in Cosa Nostra, which was translated into many languages. These memoirs read like a handbook for understanding Cosa Nostra and the life of a mafioso.

After the murder of Giovanni Falcone, Calderone gave a little-noticed but accurate analysis of the attack: "Such a spectacular public bombing is never in the interest of the Mafia … it is a sign of weakness." The killing had become necessary because of a series of major defeats, according to Calderone. "Falcone had been condemned to death a long time ago, but the sentence could no longer be put off for two reasons: the Supreme Court’s decision to confirm the life sentences of the bosses of the Commission … and the increasing certainty that Falcone would be super-prosecutor. As long as convictions could be overturned in Rome, there was no need to act. But a definitive life sentence unleashed a reaction of rage. The Corleonesi and the winning families lost their heads." He went on to predict that other killings would soon follow: "Cosa Nostra has a little book and for every name there is a time."

== Death ==
On 10 January 2013, at the age of 78, Calderone died at a secret location "overseas," according to police chief Antonio Manganelli. He had been living for years under an assumed identity outside Italy. Next to Tommaso Buscetta, Salvatore Contorno, Francesco Marino Mannoia and Gaspare Mutolo, Calderone helped Palermo magistrates like Giovanni Falcone to get a picture of the inner workings of the Mafia and its relationships with entrepreneurs and politicians in Sicily. "Calderone made a great contribution to our understanding of the Mafia phenomenon", said Manganelli.

== Biography ==
- Arlacchi, Pino & Antonio Calderone (1992). Men of Dishonor. Inside the Sicilian Mafia. An Account of Antonio Calderone, New York: William Morrow & Co.

== Sources ==
- Gambetta, Diego (1993). The Sicilian Mafia: The Business of Private Protection, London: Harvard University Press, ISBN 0-674-80742-1
- Behan, Tom (1996). The Camorra, London: Routledge, ISBN 0-415-09987-0
- Paoli, Letizia (2003). Mafia Brotherhoods: Organized Crime, Italian Style, Oxford/New York: Oxford University Press ISBN 0-19-515724-9
- Schneider, Jane T. & Peter T. Schneider (2003). Reversible Destiny: Mafia, Antimafia, and the Struggle for Palermo , Berkeley: University of California Press ISBN 0-520-23609-2
- Stille, Alexander (1995). Excellent Cadavers. The Mafia and the Death of the First Italian Republic, New York: Vintage ISBN 0-09-959491-9
