= Giuseppe Calderone =

Member of the Sicilian Mafia

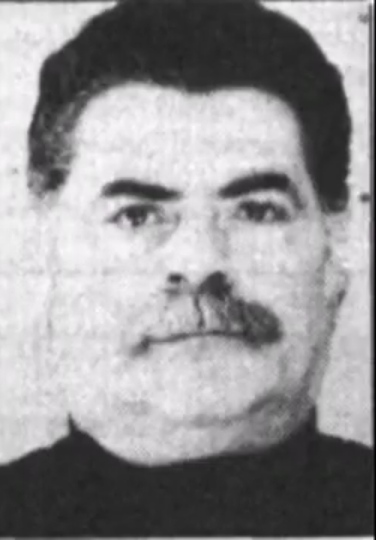
- Born: 1 November 1925; Catania, Sicily, Kingdom of Italy
- Died: 8 September 1978 (aged 52); Catania, Sicily, Italy
- Cause of death: Gunshot
- Other names: “Pippo” Calderone; Pippo ‘cannarozzo d’argento’
- Occupation: Mafia boss
- Known for: Head of the Catania Mafia family
- Parent(s): Salvatore Calderone; Giuseppa Saitta
- Allegiance: Catania Mafia family

Giuseppe “Pippo” Calderone (Catania, 1 November 1925 – Catania, 8 September 1978) was an influential Sicilian mafioso from Catania, eventually becoming the capo of the Catania Mafia family.

He became the ‘secretary’ of the Interprovincial Commission, formed around 1975 at his instigation. Its purpose was to coordinate the provincial Mafia commissions and avoid conflicts over public contracts that crossed provincial borders. Calderone was killed in 1978, on the orders of Totò Riina.

== Early years ==
According to Pippo's brother Antonino Calderone (who became a pentito in 1987) the first Mafia family in Catania was started by Antonio Saitta in 1925. He had been prosecuted by Mussolini’s Iron Prefect, Cesare Mori. One of his daughters was the mother of Giuseppe and Antonino Calderone.

Another uncle had helped the Mafia get back on its feet after World War II, organizing the black market in contraband cigarettes. Cosa Nostra's control in Catania was at times challenged by internal power struggles and by the actions of crime clans not affiliated with the Mafia. Violent disputes between these various clans were somewhat common.

In the early 1960s, Calderone was already a man of honour and had the role of consigliere within the Catania mafia, which at the time was headed by Orazio Nicotra. In the mid-1960s, Giuseppe becomes the capo of the Catania Mafia family.

Initially, the Catania mafia family headed by Calderone went through difficult times economically. They earned some money with cigarette smuggling and ran an Agip petrol station, thanks to a franchise they acquired through Christian Democrat politician Graziano Verzotto. Giuseppe Calderone and Senator Graziano Verzotto were the best men at the marriage of the Mafia boss from Riesi in the province of Caltanissetta, Giuseppe Di Cristina.

At the beginning of the 1970s, the Calderone clan developed a relationship with the construction entrepreneur Carmelo Costanzo – one of the four Cavalieri del Lavoro (Knights of Labour), together with Francesco Finocchiaro, Mario Rendo and Gaetano Graci – who needed the mafiosi for protection. Construction sites of rival companies were bombed and at least one rival of Costanzo was assassinated. They made sure there would be no problems for Costanzo's companies when they worked elsewhere in Sicily.

== At the top in Cosa Nostra ==
Giuseppe Calderone became one of the leaders of Cosa Nostra. He established good relationships with the Mafia families from Palermo. On 17 June 1970, the traffic police in Milan stopped an Alfa Romeo for speeding. In the car were Tommaso Buscetta, Salvatore "Ciaschiteddu" Greco, Gerlando Alberti, Gaetano Badalamenti and Giuseppe Calderone. Unaware of the identity of the men in the car the police let them continue their journey.

The mafiosi were involved in a series of meetings about the future of Cosa Nostra. They decided to set up a new Sicilian Mafia Commission (the first one was dissolved after the Ciaculli massacre) – initially headed by a triumvirate consisting of Gaetano Badalamenti, Stefano Bontade and the Corleonesi boss Luciano Leggio.

At the time, Calderone was also involved in the negotiations between Cosa Nostra and prince Junio Valerio Borghese who asked for support for his plans for a neo-fascist coup in return for a pardon of convicted mafiosi like Leggio and Vincenzo Rimi. According to Mafia turncoat Tommaso Buscetta the prince Borghese wanted a list of all mafiosi of Sicily. Calderone and Giuseppe Di Cristina went to Rome and met the prince Borghese. They told Borghese they wouldn't give him any list and also asked him to manage the trials they were interested in. However, the Mafia decided not to participate and the so-called Golpe Borghese fizzled out on the night of 8 December 1970.

According to reports, Calderone was the godfather in the baptism of one of the sons of Ciro Mazzarella, an important Camorra boss and at the time the head of the Mazzarella clan.

== Interprovincial Commission ==
In February 1975 an Interprovincial Commission was formed at the instigation of Giuseppe Calderone who became its first "secretary". It was meant to coordinate the provincial Mafia commissions and avoid conflicts over business interests such as public works contracts that crossed provincial borders. The other members were Gaetano Badalamenti for Palermo, Giuseppe Settecasi (Agrigento), Cola Buccellato (Trapani), Angelo Mongiovì (Enna) and Giuseppe Di Cristina (Caltanissetta).

While Calderone was elevated to the Commission his underboss Nitto Santapaola took over the business in Catania for the Mafia family. He managed the interests in heroin trafficking and acted as chief enforcer for the leading businessmen. Meanwhile, Santapaola carefully built a private faction within the family that was loyal to him – and strengthened relations with Riina and the Corleonesi. While Riina was a fugitive he frequently spent time in and around Catania and often went hunting with Santapaola around the local mountains.

== At war with the Corleonesi ==
Calderone and Di Cristina became early targets of Totò Riina and Bernardo Provenzano and their Corleonesi in their attempt to dominate the Sicilian Mafia. The Corleonesi were attacking the allies of the Palermo families in the other provinces to isolate men like Stefano Bontade, Salvatore Inzerillo and Gaetano Badalamenti.

Calderone and Di Cristina recognised the danger. Calderone was challenged by Nitto Santapaola in Catania, while Francesco Madonia, capo of the Vallelunga Pratameno Mafia family (not to be confused with Francesco "Ciccio" Madonia from Palermo), wanted to eliminate Di Cristina in the province of Caltanissetta. On 21 November 1977, Di Cristina survived a shooting, but his most loyal men Giuseppe Di Fede and Carlo Napolitano were murdered by the Corleonesi. Madonia was suspected to be behind the attack.

In January 1978, Salvatore "Ciaschiteddu" Greco, the old and ailing former head of the Sicilian Mafia Commission, came all the way from Venezuela to try to restrain Calderone, Di Cristina, Gaetano Badalamenti and Salvatore Inzerillo from retaliating against the growing power of the Corleonesi. Di Cristina and Badalamenti wanted to kill Francesco Madonia, the boss of Vallelunga Mafia family and an ally of the Corleonesi in the province of Caltanissetta. Greco tried to convince them not to go ahead and offered Di Cristina the opportunity to emigrate to Venezuela.

Nevertheless, Calderone, Badalamenti and Di Cristina decided to go on and Francesco Madonia was murdered on 8 April 1978, by Di Cristina and Salvatore Pillera (from Catania, who was dispatched by Calderone). In retaliation, Di Cristina was killed in May 1978 by the Corleonesi. Next was Giuseppe Calderone, who was killed on 8 September 1978. His rival Nitto Santapaola – who had forged an alliance with the Corleonesi – took over the command of the Catania Mafia Family. These killings were just a prelude to the Second Mafia War that really started after the murder of Stefano Bontade in 1981.

One of the more bizarre anecdotes Calderone's brother Antonio Calderone (who became a state witness in 1987) related in his memoirs was that of Riina giving an impassioned eulogy of Pippo Calderone as a great peacemaker at the funeral that reduced many hardened mafiosi to tears, even though they knew that Riina himself probably had ordered the killing.
