= Saint Catherine of Alexandria (disambiguation) =

Saint Catherine of Alexandria (c. 287 – c. 305) was a Christian virgin martyr.

Saint Catherine of Alexandria may also refer to:

== Churches ==
- Cathedral of St. Catherine of Alexandria, Old Goa, India
- Church of Saint Catherine of Alexandria, Topoľčianky, Slovakia
- Saint Catherine of Alexandria Cathedral (Dumaguete), Negros Oriental, Philippines
- St. Catherine of Alexandria Church, Budapest, Hungary
- St. Catherine's Cathedral, Alexandria, Egypt

== Paintings ==
- Saint Catherine of Alexandria (Caravaggio)
- Saint Catherine of Alexandria (Artemisia Gentileschi, Florence)
- Saint Catherine of Alexandria (Artemisia Gentileschi, Stockholm)
- Saint Catherine of Alexandria (Palladas, Heraklion)
- Saint Catherine of Alexandria (Palladas, Sinai)
- Saint Catherine of Alexandria (Raphael)
- Saint Catherine of Alexandria (Signorelli)
- Saint Catherine of Alexandria (Master Theodoric)

== See also ==
- Santa Caterina d'Alessandria (disambiguation)
