= Aaron Arrowsmith =

English cartographer and publisher (1750–1823)

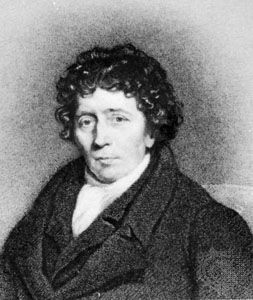
- Born: 1750; England
- Died: 1823 (aged 72–73); London, England
- Occupations: Cartographer; Engraver

Aaron Arrowsmith (1750–1823) was an English cartographer, engraver, publisher and founding member of the Arrowsmith family of geographers.

== Life ==
Arrowsmith moved to Soho Square, London, from Winston, County Durham, when about twenty years of age, and was employed by John Cary, the engraver, and William Faden. He became hydrographer to the Prince of Wales c. 1810 and subsequently to the king in 1820. In January 1790, he made himself famous by his large chart of the world on Mercator projection. Four years later, he published another large map of the world on the globular projection, with a companion volume of explanation. Improperly attributed "Arrowsmith's projection", the globular projection used by Arrowsmith was invented by Giovan Battista Nicolosi, of Paternò, Sicily, in 1660, while Arrowsmith did not use it until 1794. The maps of North America (1796) and Scotland (1807) are the most celebrated of his many later productions.

In 1804, 63 maps drawn by Arrowsmith and Samuel Lewis of Philadelphia (publisher of William Clark's manuscript map of the Northwest) were published in the New and elegant General Atlas Comprising all Discoveries to the Present Time. Later editions of the atlas were published in 1805, 1812 and 1819. The 1804 and 1812 editions are digitised in the David Rumsey map collection.

Arrowsmith's 1808 map of the Western Hemisphere and Eastern Hemisphere was updated, corrected and enlarged by James Gardner in 1825.

A careful comparison of this left this writer spellbound both by the coverage of Arrowsmith's map, and by the quality of Gardner's modifications, including his notes documenting subsequent exploration.

— David L. Walker, 2014

He left two sons, Aaron and Samuel. Aaron Arrowsmith Jr (1802–1854), the elder of the two sons, was the compiler of the Eton Comparative Atlas and a Geographical Dictionary of the Holy Scriptures (1855). Samuel Arrowsmith (died 1839) was the compiler of a Biblical atlas, and of various manuals of geography.

Aaron Arrowsmith Sr was responsible for organising the volume of maps for Rees's Cyclopædia, 1802–19.

The business was thus carried on in company with John Arrowsmith (1790–1873), nephew of the Aaron Sr. In 1821, they published a more complete North American map from a combination of a maps obtained from the Hudson's Bay Company and Aaron's previous one.

Mount Arrowsmith, situated east of Port Alberni on Vancouver Island, British Columbia, is named for Aaron Arrowsmith and his nephew John Arrowsmith.

== Maps published ==
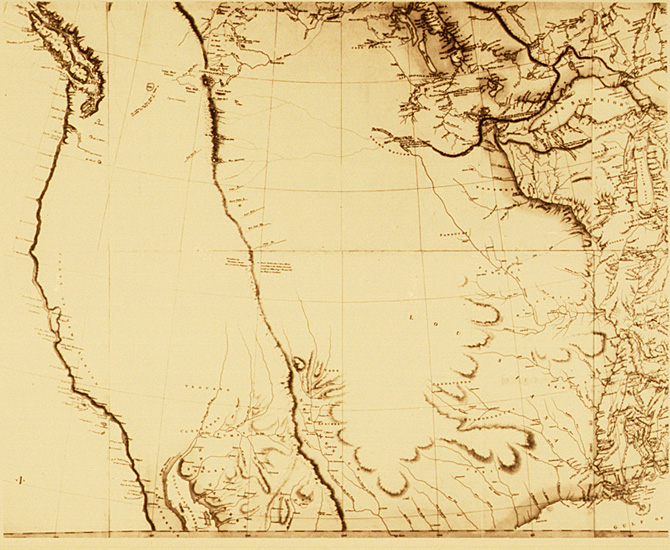
Arrowsmith's Map Exhibiting All the New Discoveries in the Interior Parts of North America, dated 1 January 1795

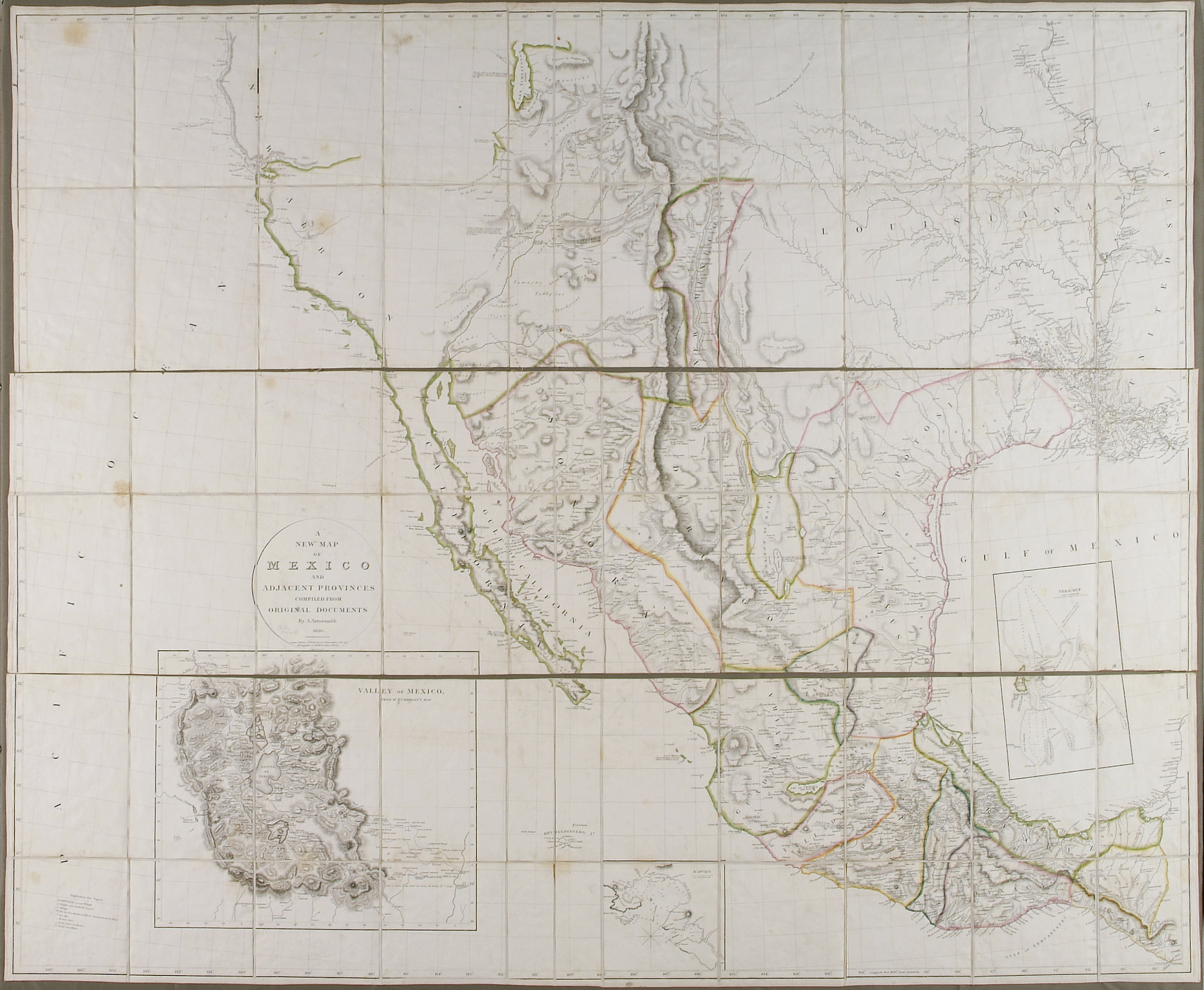
Arrowsmith's A New Map of Mexico and Adjacent Provinces, 1810

- Chart of the world on Mercator's projection, exhibiting all the new discoveries to the present time: with the tracks of the most distinguished navigators since the year 1700, carefully collected from the best charts, maps, voyages, &c extant., 1790 (8 sheets)
- A Map Exhibiting All the New Discoveries in the Interior Parts of North America, 1 January 1795, with numerous other editions, including in 1796, 1802, 1811, 1814, 1818, 1819, and 1824. The 1802 version of this map was studied closely by Meriwether Lewis prior to the Lewis and Clark Expedition and the 1811 edition was updated with the published information from that expedition in the 1814 edition.
- Chart of the Galapagos drawn by James Colnett on an exploratory voyage to the eastern Pacific, 1798
- Chart of the Pacific Ocean Drawn from a great number of Printed and Ms. Journals..., 1798, 1820 edition (9 sheets)
- Africa To The Committee and Members of the British Association, 1802 (4 sheets), 1811 edition
- Chart of the West Indies And Spanish Dominions in North America, 1803 (4 sheets)
- Map of America, 1804, 1808 edition, 1811 edition
- Chart of the East Indies Islands, Exhibiting the several Passages between the Indian and Pacific Oceans, 1800, 1809 edition, 1812 edition, 1824 edition
- A New Map of Mexico and Adjacent Provinces Compiled from Original Documents., 1810 (4 sheets)
- Map of Countries Round the North Pole, 1818
