= Santa Caterina d'Alessandria =

Santa Caterina d'Alessandria may refer to the following churches in Italy:

- Santa Caterina d'Alessandria, Padua, Veneto
- Santa Caterina d'Alessandria, Parma, Emilia-Romagna
- Santa Caterina d'Alessandria, Paternò, Catania, Sicily
- Santa Caterina d'Alessandria, Pisa, Tuscany
- Santa Caterina d'Alessandria, Soragna, Parma, Emilia-Romagna

== See also ==
- Saint Catherine of Alexandria (disambiguation)
