= List of counties of England by area in 1815 =

This is a list of historic counties of England by area according to the Arrowsmith map of 1815-6, which was in turn generated from the work of the Ordnance Survey.

Rank	County	Area
1	Yorkshire	5,961 sq mi
2	Lincolnshire	2,748 sq mi
3	Devon	2,579 sq mi
4	Norfolk	2,092 sq mi
5	Northumberland	1,871 sq mi
6	Lancashire	1,831 sq mi
7	Somerset	1,642 sq mi
8	Hampshire	1,628 sq mi
9	Kent	1,537 sq mi
10	Essex	1,532 sq mi
11	Suffolk	1,512 sq mi
12	Cumberland	1,478 sq mi
13	Sussex	1,463 sq mi
14	Wiltshire	1,379 sq mi
15	Shropshire	1,341 sq mi
16	Cornwall	1,327 sq mi
17	Gloucestershire	1,256 sq mi
18	Staffordshire	1,148 sq mi
19	County Durham	1,061 sq mi
20	Cheshire	1,052 sq mi
21	Derbyshire	1,026 sq mi
22	Northamptonshire	1,017 sq mi
23	Dorset	1,005 sq mi
24	Warwickshire	902 sq mi
25	Herefordshire	860 sq mi
26	Cambridgeshire	858 sq mi
27	Nottinghamshire	837 sq mi
28	Leicestershire	804 sq mi
29	Westmorland	763 sq mi
30	Surrey	758 sq mi
31	Berkshire	756 sq mi
32	Oxfordshire	752 sq mi
33	Buckinghamshire	740 sq mi
34	Worcestershire	729 sq mi
35	Hertfordshire	528 sq mi
36	Monmouthshire	498 sq mi
37	Bedfordshire	463 sq mi
38	Huntingdonshire	370 sq mi
39	Middlesex	282 sq mi
40	Rutland	149 sq mi
