= Castello Normanno =

Castello Normanno may refer to:

- Castello Normanno (Aci Castello)
- Castello Normanno (Paternò)
- Castello Normanno (Terlizzi)

== See also ==
- Castello Normanno-Svevo (disambiguation)
