= Roberto Vacante =

Member of the Sicilian mafia

Roberto Vacante (born 1963) is a Sicilian mafioso and a high-ranking member of the Catania Mafia family, widely regarded as its financial mastermind.

== Criminal career ==
Born in 1963, Roberto Vacante's ascent within the Catania mafia family was significantly influenced by his marriage to Irene Grazia Santapaola, daughter of Salvatore Santapaola and niece of Benedetto Santapaola, the historical capo of the Mafia family. Through this familial connection, Vacante was considered an integral member of the "blood family" of the Santapaola-Ercolano Mafia clan.

Investigative authorities, particularly through the extensive "Bulldog" operation conducted by the Catania police and anti-crime division, revealed a complex network of financial and corporate structures attributed to Vacante. These operations, allegedly serving as fronts for illicit capital reinvestment, reflected what investigators described as managerial acumen in the laundering of mafia proceeds. His role was corroborated by several state witnesses, including Santo La Causa and Eugenio Sturiale, who described Vacante as a key player in reinvesting the Santapaola family's illicit funds into diverse legal economic activities.

The 2016 arrest of Roberto Vacante marked a critical moment in anti-mafia operations. He was apprehended alongside 15 others and charged with mafia association, fictitious registration of assets, and other related crimes. At the time of his arrest, Vacante was described by the public prosecutor as a representative of the inner circle of the Santapaola-Ercolano clan. He was sentenced in 2017 to eleven years and six months of imprisonment under a unified charge. His imprisonment was served under the restrictive 41-bis prison regime, a measure reserved for high-ranking mafia members.

Roberto Vacante's criminal profile was further substantiated by a decree issued in early 2018, which led to the confiscation of numerous businesses and properties. The measure highlighted his prominent role as the "entrepreneurial mind" behind the Santapaola family's money laundering operations. Confiscated assets, valued at approximately 15 million euros, included companies in sectors ranging from beach resorts and catering to sports facilities and parking management. Investigations indicated a marked discrepancy between Vacante's declared income and the substantial assets under his control, which were often held in the names of associates acting as figureheads.

Among his key associates was Salvatore Caruso, later sentenced for mafia-related charges. The trial also resulted in convictions for his wife, Irene Grazia Santapaola, and several others, mainly for fictitious asset registration with mafia aggravating factors.

A notable episode that underscored Vacante's standing within the organization involved a recorded wiretap in which he declared, “I am a Santapaola. It's my family…,” in response to someone invoking connections to the Santapaola family. This statement, cited in multiple investigations, encapsulates the personal identification of Vacante with the Santapaola criminal legacy, both through blood ties and organizational authority.

Throughout the years, Roberto Vacante's name appeared in various police dossiers, including the “Kronos” investigation, which reported his participation in a mafia summit in Paternò in December 2016. While the supposed new operational boss of the Catania Mafia clan, Francesco Santapaola, was absent, investigators believe Vacante may have represented him.

Vacante has since completed his sentence and, as of 2024, is a free man. Notably, while the main "Bulldog" trial experienced procedural delays, resulting in a first-instance verdict only in September 2024, the separate abbreviated trial involving Vacante had already reached final judgment.
