= Santa Maria della Valle di Iosaphat =

Church building in Paternò, Italy

Coordinates: 37.56580°N 14.89489°E

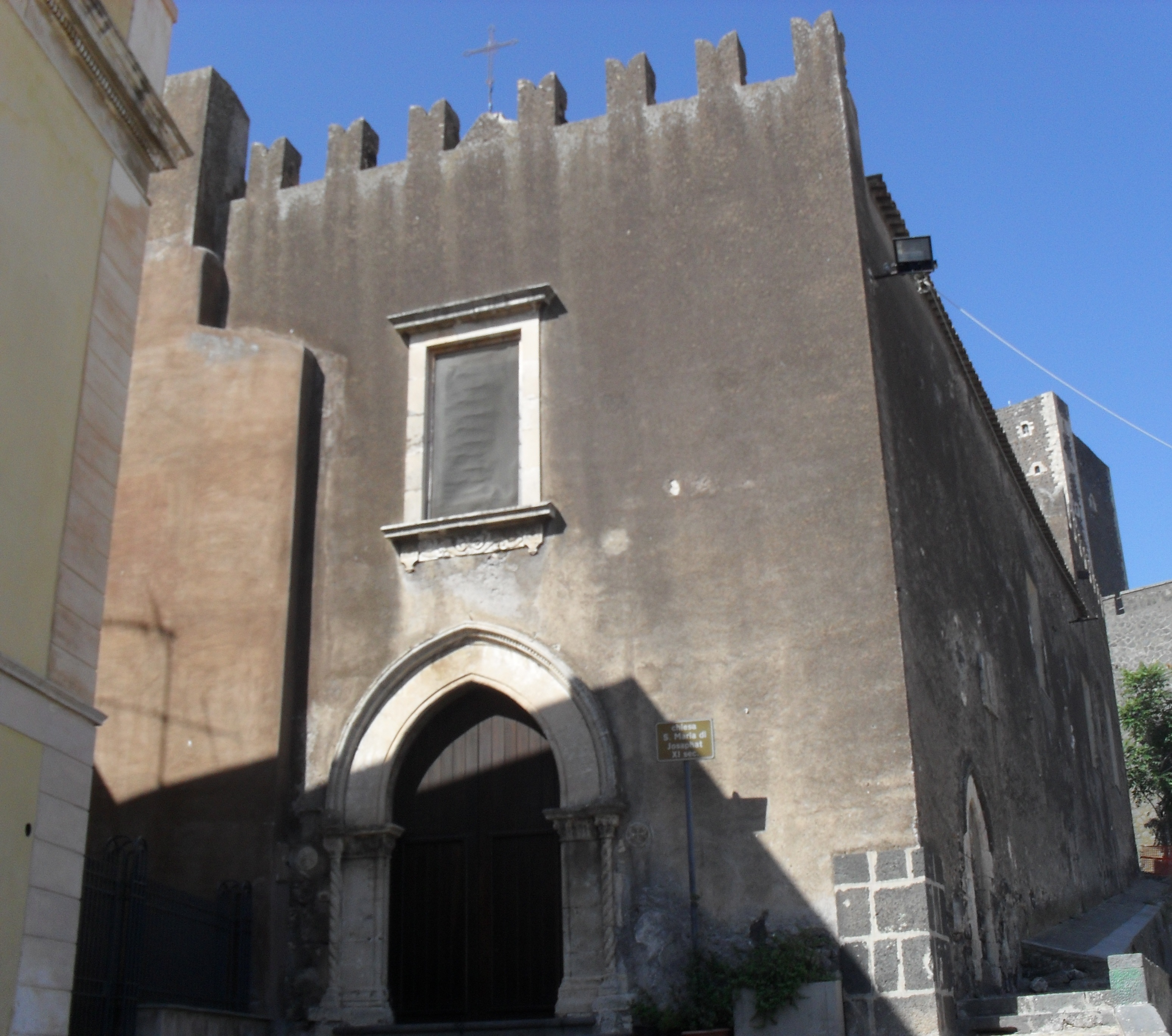
Facade of church

Santa Maria della Valle di Iosaphat, or Josaphat is a small Gothic style Roman Catholic church built just below the former acropolis of Paternò in Sicily. It is also referred to as the Chiesa della Gancia.

== History ==
The church was built in 1072 under the patronage of the Adelasia da Monferrato, the wife of Count Roger I of Sicily. The external outlines of the church retain some of the Norman gothic elements, but the interior has been refurbished and retains little of the original decoration. The wooden interior ceiling dates to the 16th century. The facade of the church rises after a few broad dark basaltic stairs. The ogival portal has decorated pilasters. An adjacent door on the right flank has been filled in. The facade rises to a merlionated roofline, apt for the fortress-like enclosures that surrounded the nearby hill-top Norman castle. the church stood adjacent to a former Benedictine monastery, and later hospital of Santissimo Salvatore, now converted in to a civic art museum, the Palazzo delle Arti.
