= Castello Normanno-Svevo =

Castello Normanno-Svevo may refer to:

- Castello Normanno-Svevo (Bari)
- Castello Normanno-Svevo (Sannicandro di Bari)

== See also ==
- Castello Normanno (disambiguation)
