= Giovan Battista Nicolosi =

Italian geographer, presbyter and writer

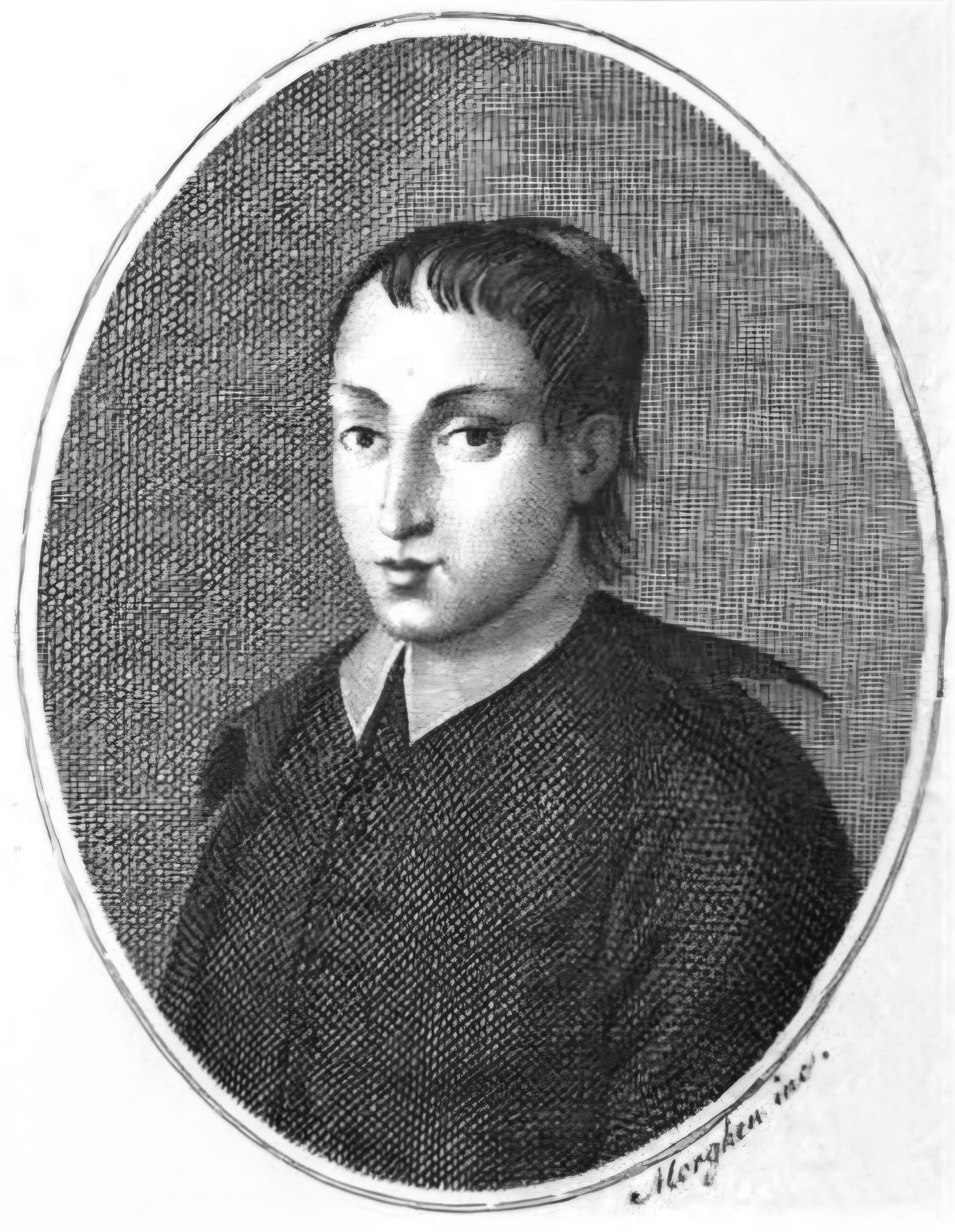
- Engraved portrait of Giovan Battista Nicolosi by Raffaello Morghen
- Born: 14 October 1610; Paternò, Kingdom of Sicily
- Died: 19 January 1670 (aged 59); Rome, Papal States
- Occupations: Geographer and scholar
- Known for: Nicolosi globular projection
- Parent(s): Antonio Nicolosi and Antonina Nicolosi (née Corsaro)

Academic background
- Influences: Galilei; Fournier; Sanson; Kircher

Academic work
- Era: Scientific Revolution
- Discipline: Geographer; Cosmologist; Cartographer
- Institutions: Sapienza University of Rome; Sacred Congregation for the Propagation of the Faith
- Influenced: Duval; Delisle; Arrowsmith

Giovan Battista Nicolosi D.D. (14 October 1610 – 19 January 1670) was a Sicilian priest and geographer. Nicolosi proposed a new projection for the construction of the world map in two hemispheres, known today as the Nicolosi globular projection, in which the parallels and meridians are arcs of the circle and equidistant along the equator and central meridian.

== Biography ==
=== Early life ===
Giovan Battista Nicolosi was born in Paternò, on October 14, 1610, of poor parents. He was the second child in a family of ten siblings.

In 1640 Nicolosi moved to Rome, where he devoted himself to the study of mathematics and geography and quickly gained favor with the city's most powerful families. In 1642, he published his Teorica del Globo Terrestre ("Theory of the Terrestrial Globe"), a small geographical treatise in which he adopts the tripartite division of the subject into mathematical, physical, and political geography, usually credited to Varenius. Although in his unpublished works he showed leanings towards the new views of Copernicus, he does not here venture to break away from the Ptolemaic system, no doubt owing to his character as a devout son of the Church.

=== Career ===
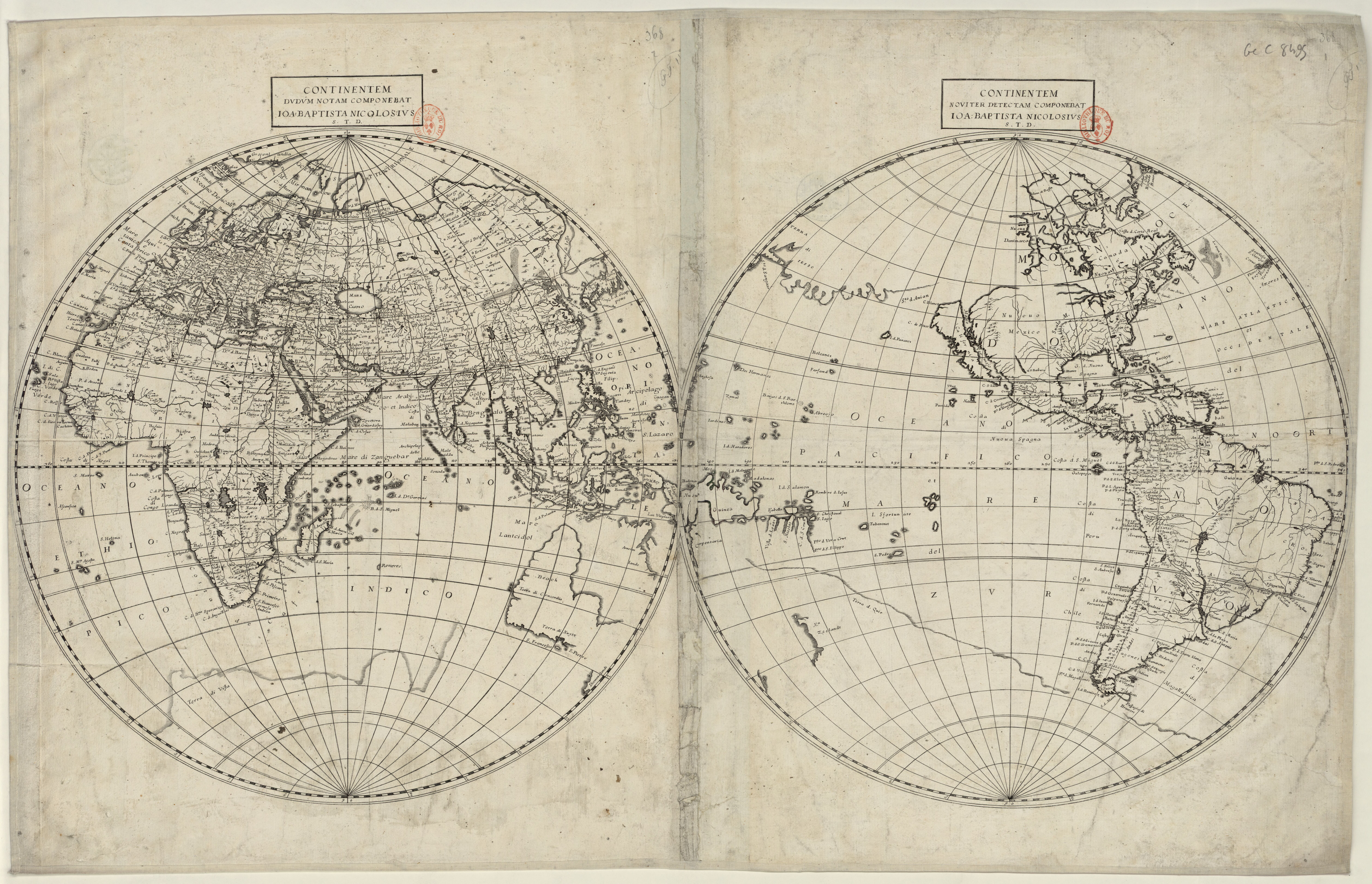
Nicolosi globular projection

The Theory of the Terrestrial Globe brought Nicolosi to the attention of broader scientific circles and earned him the Chair in Geography at Sapienza University of Rome. In late 1645, Nicolosi travelled to Germany at the invitation of Ferdinand Maximilian, margrave of Baden, where he remained until 1647. In 1647 he returned to Rome, and was appointed chaplain at Santa Maria Maggiore. In 1652, possibly motivated by Nicolas Sanson's new collection of maps, the Sacred Congregation for the Propagation of the Faith (Propaganda Fide) hired Nicolosi to compose a new atlas. After twelve years of study and research, he published the Dell’Hercole e studio geografico, in two volumes with maps and directions for making maps and globes. The first volume was principally occupied with a detailed description of the countries of the world, while the second formed an atlas of twenty-two newly devised maps — two of the hemispheres, and four devoted to each of the five continents. In this atlas Nicolosi was the first to employ the so-called polyconic or pseudo-perspective projection on a printed map. This projection technique was suggested in the eleventh century by the Persian mathematician al-Bīrūnī. Nicolosi reinvented al-Bīrūnī's projection as a modification of Fournier's first projection. It is unlikely Nicolosi knew of al-Bīrūnī's work, and Nicolosi's name is the one usually associated with the projection. This became a standard method of showing the two hemispheres of Earth during the nineteenth century after the equatorial stereographic projection popularized by Gerardus Mercator finally fell into disuse.

Nicolosi also undertook for Pope Alexander VII and the Emperor Leopold I the mapping of the States of the Church and the Kingdom of Naples, besides making five large maps for Prince Borghese. Nicolosi's last published work is Guida allo studio geografico ("Guide to geographic study"), a small treatise designed to supplement and explain the other two. He died in Rome on January 19, 1670.

== Works ==
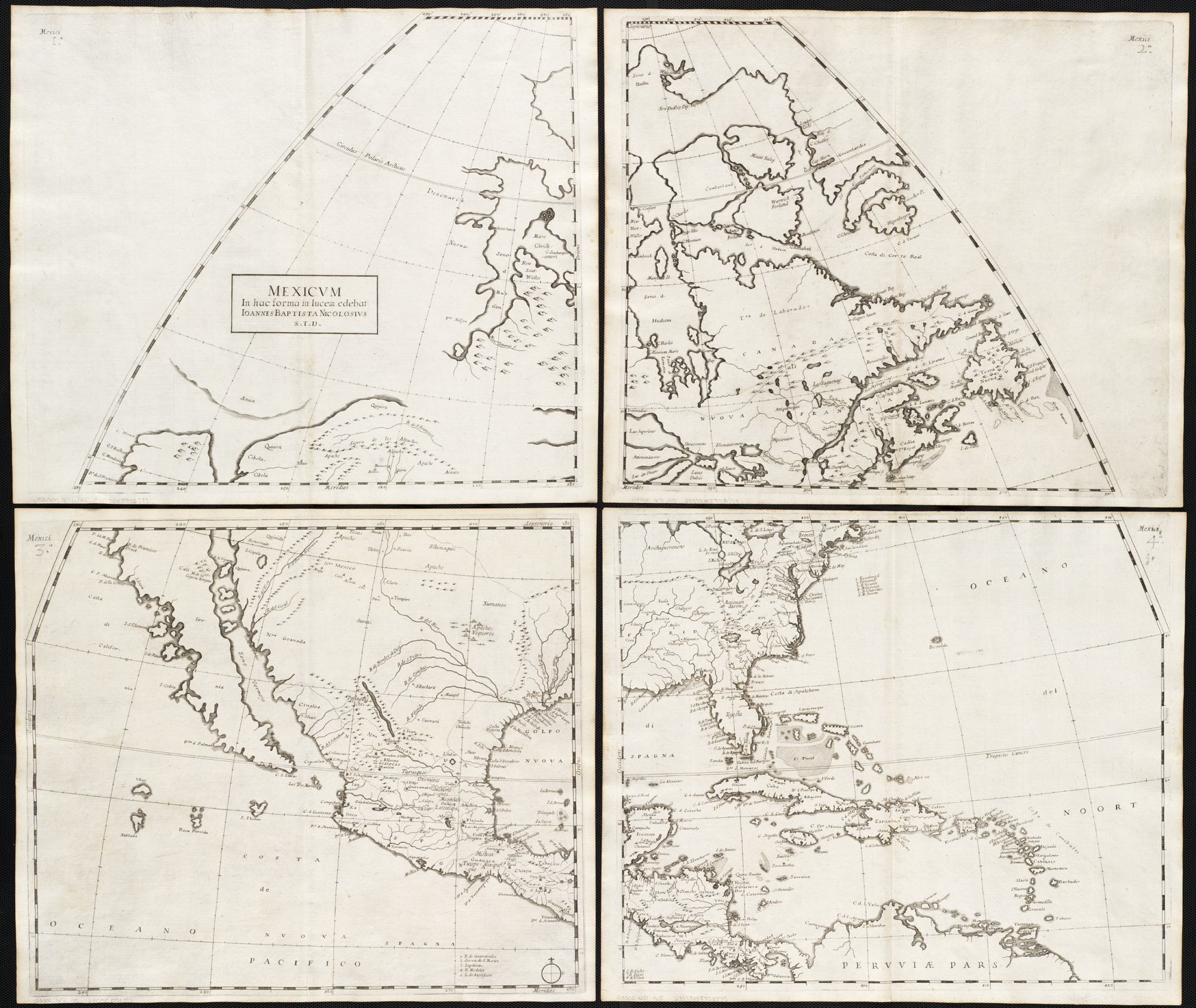
Rare first state of Nicolosi's four sheet map of North America, the first printed map to accurately depict the course of the Rio Grande (named Rio Escondido) flowing into the Gulf of Mexico (named “Golfo di Nuova Spagna”).

- Nicolosi, Giovan Battista (1642). Teorica del globo terrestre et esplicatione della Carta da Navigare. Roma: per Manelfo Manelfi.
- Nicolosi, Giovan Battista (1660). Dell'Hercole e studio geografico. Vol. 1. Roma: Nella stamperia di Vitale Mascardi.
- Nicolosi, Giovan Battista (1660). Dell'Hercole e studio geografico. Vol. 2. Roma: Nella stamperia di Vitale Mascardi.
- Nicolosi, Giovan Battista (1662). Guida allo studio geografico. Roma: Appresso Vitale Mascardi.
- Nicolosi, Giovan Battista (1670). Hercules Siculus sive Studium Geographicum (in Latin). Vol. 1. Roma: typis Michaëlis Herculis.
- Nicolosi, Giovan Battista (1671). Hercules Siculus sive Studium Geographicum (in Latin). Vol. 2. Roma: typis Michaëlis Herculis.

There exists in the Biblioteca Casanatense a considerable collection of Nicolosi’s unpublished work. This includes a large chorographic map of all of Christendom, commissioned by Pope Alexander VII, as well as a full geographic description and map of the Kingdom of Naples, which was sent to Holy Roman Emperor Leopold I in 1654 and an important relation of his trip to Germany (Viagio di Germania in tante lettere al cardinale Rinaldo d’Este e Parentele della casa di Baden con le corone e principi di Europa).

== Gallery of images ==
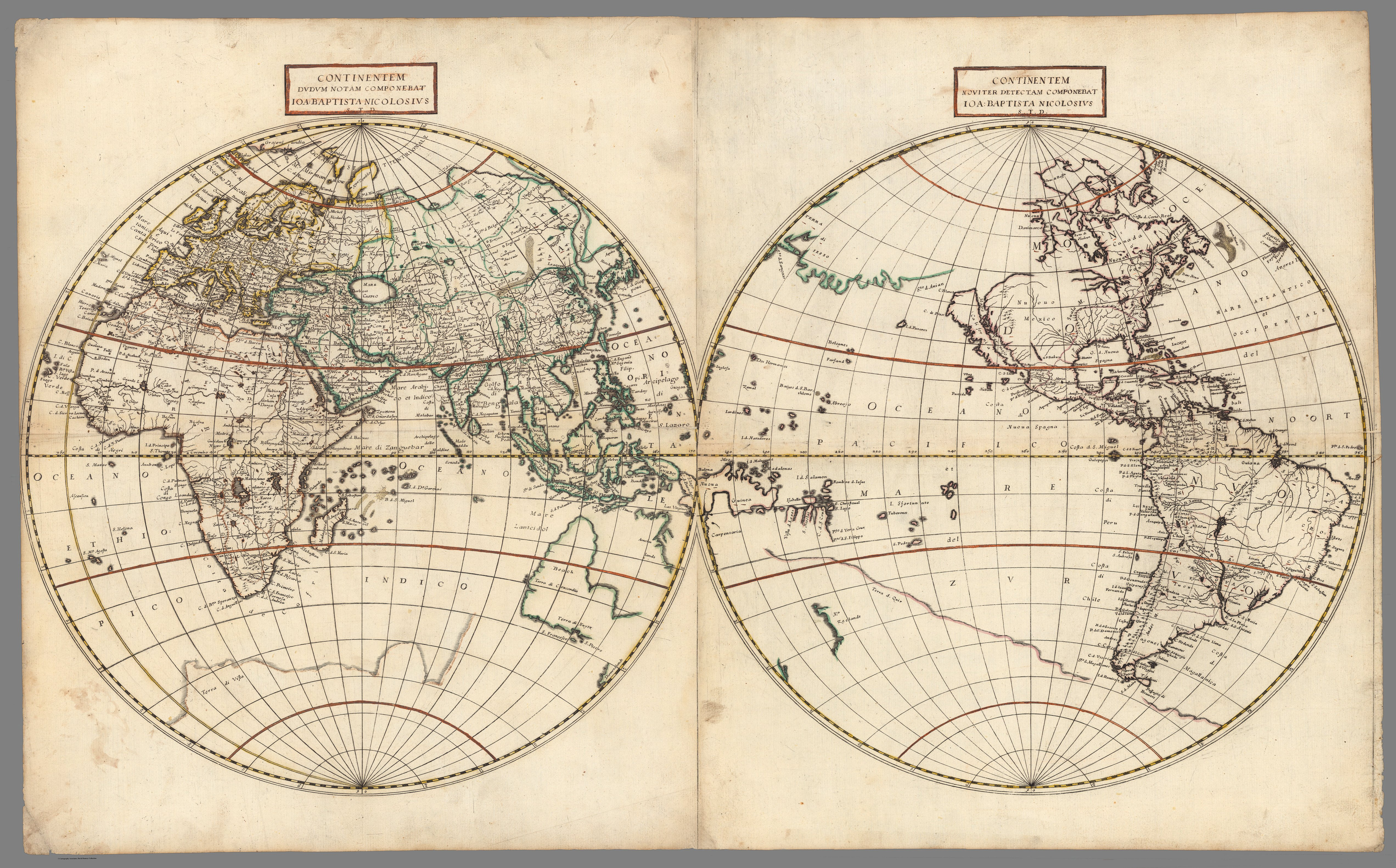
World map as it appears in Nicolosi's Dell'Hercole e studio geografico, 1660

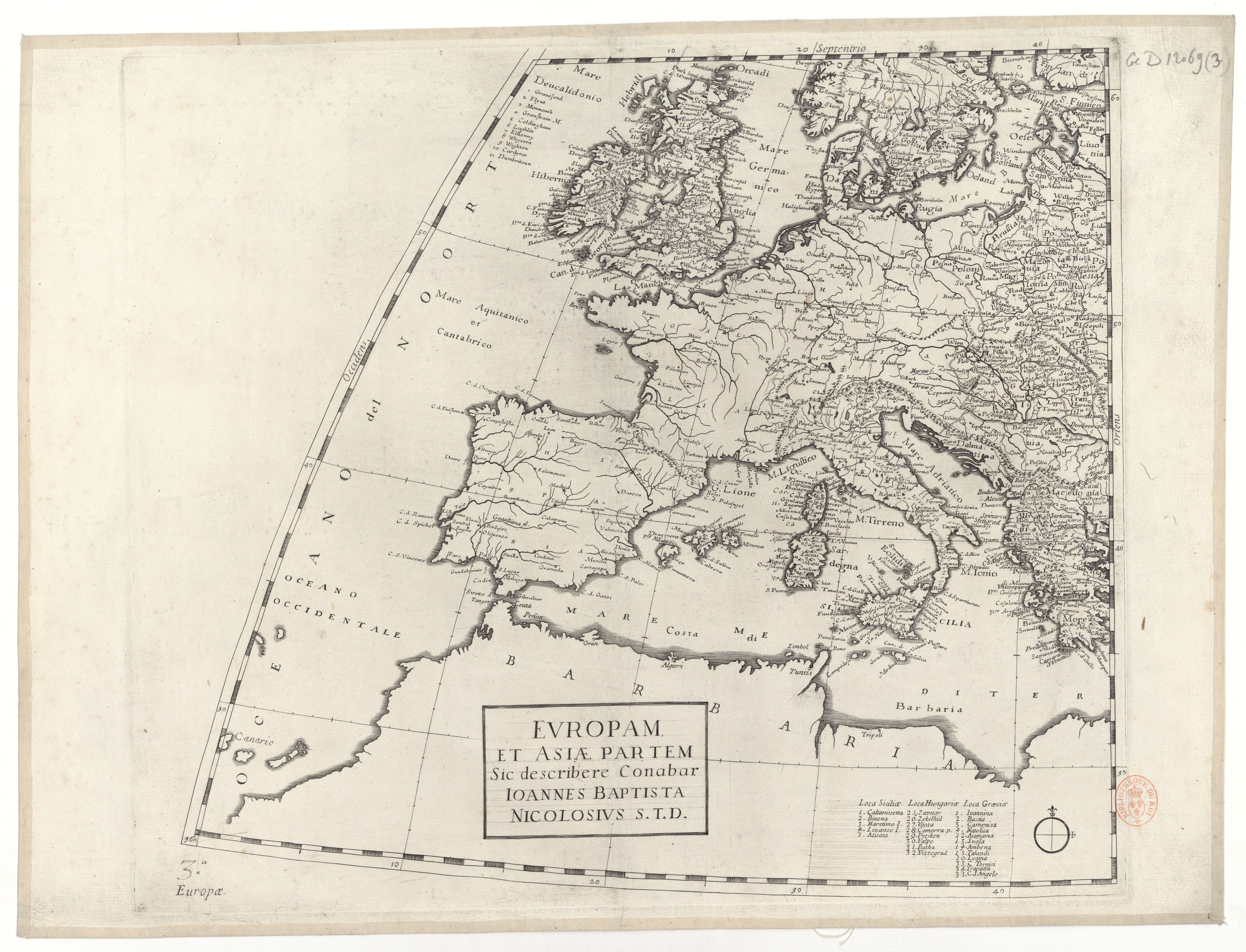
Nicolosi's map of Western Europe, 1660, Département Cartes et plans, Bibliothèque nationale de France, Paris

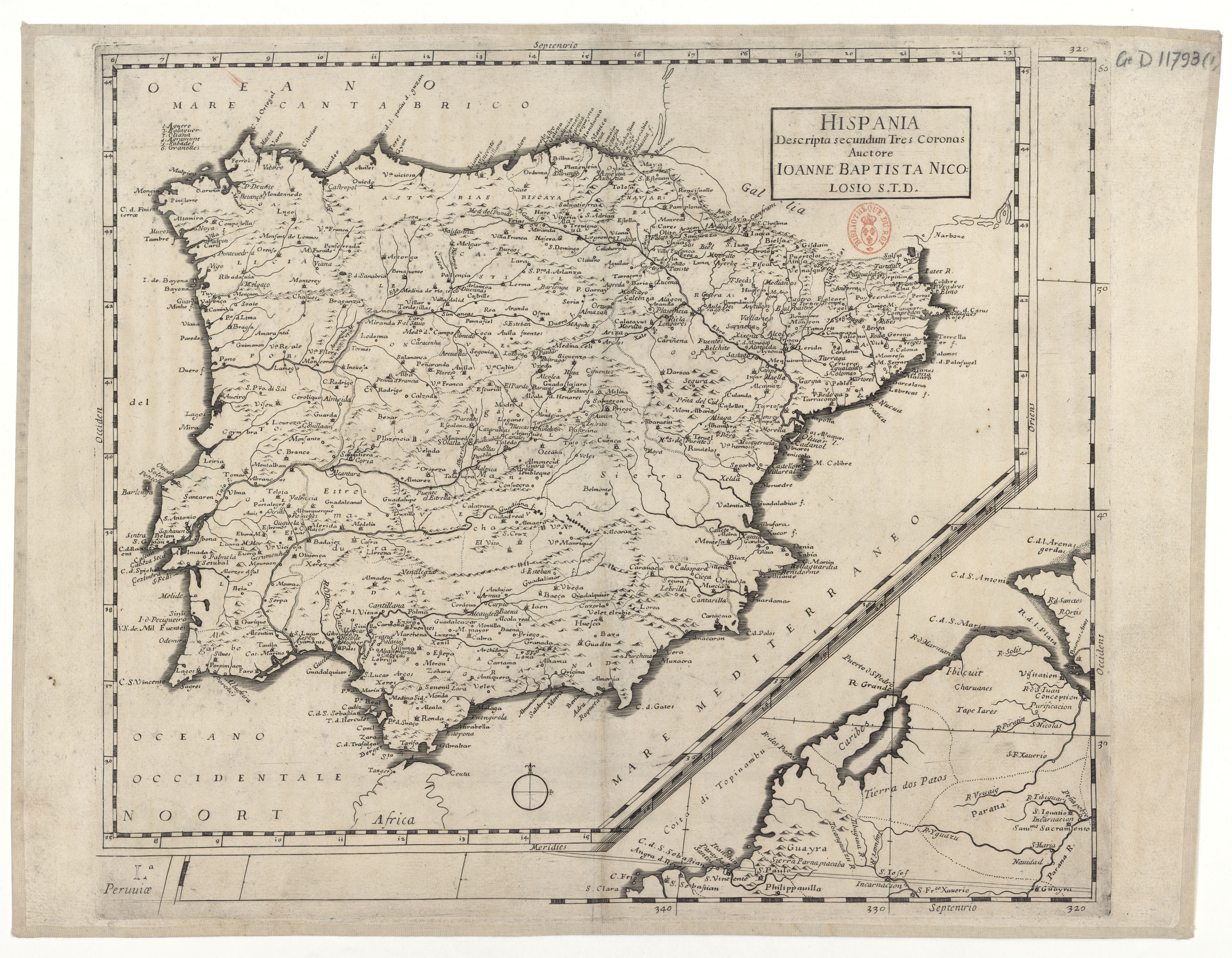
Nicolosi's map of Spain, 1660, Département Cartes et plans, Bibliothèque nationale de France, Paris

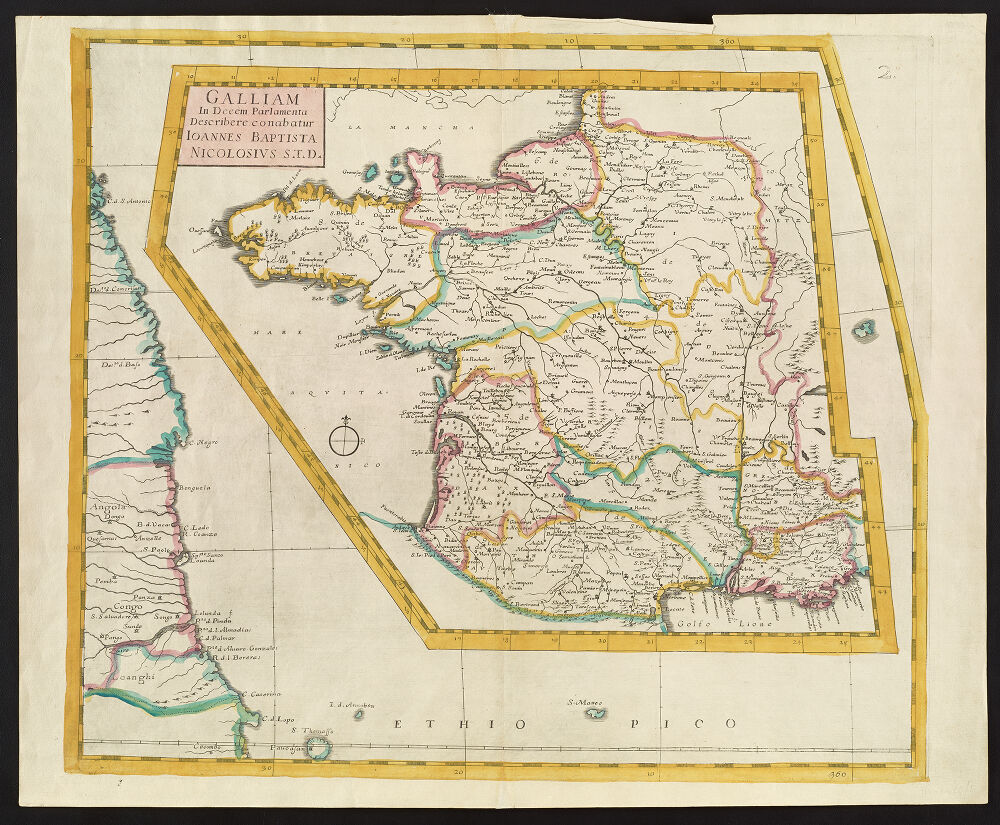
Nicolosi's map of France, 1660, University Library, University of Illinois Urbana-Champaign

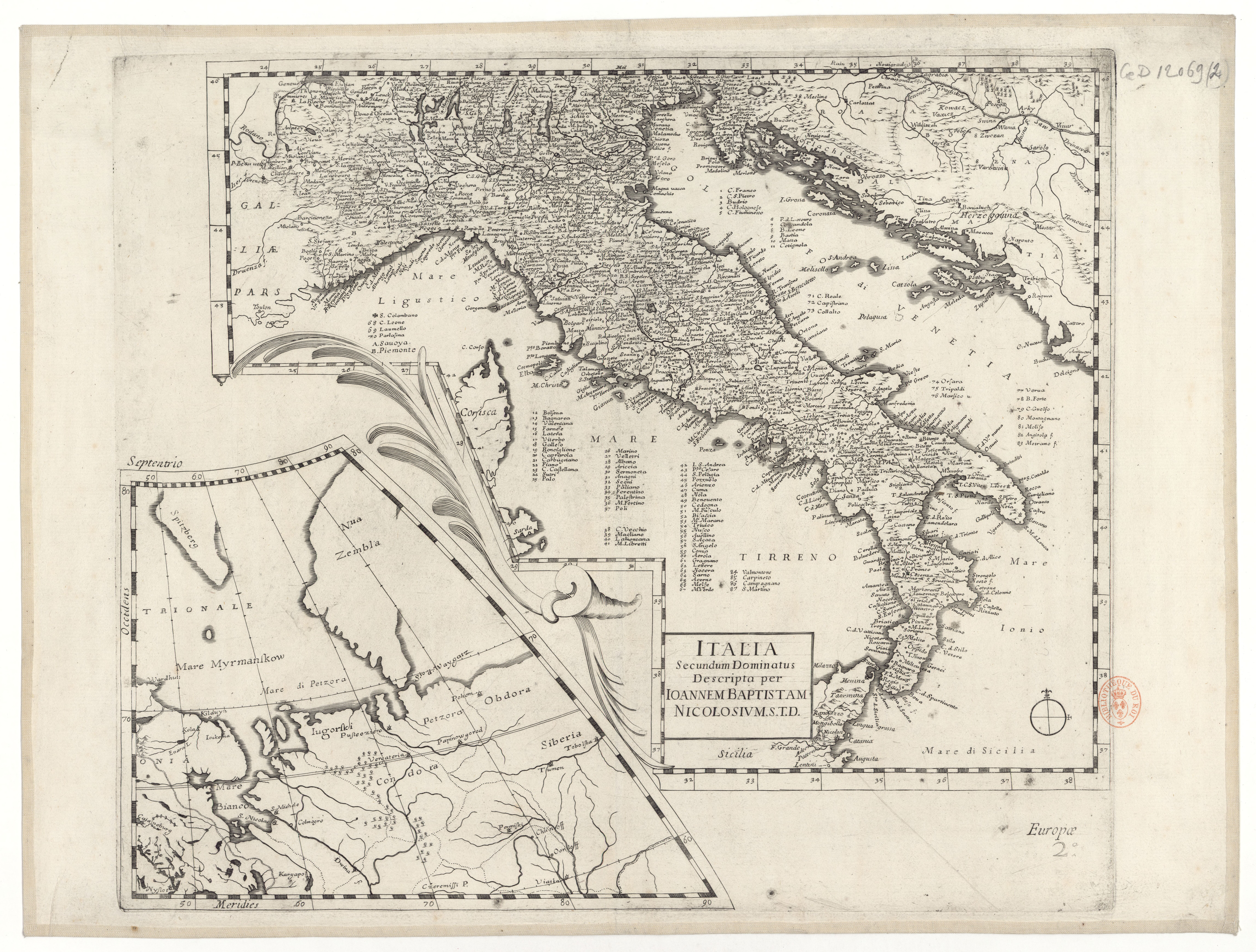
Nicolosi's map of Italy, 1660, Département Cartes et plans, Bibliothèque nationale de France, Paris

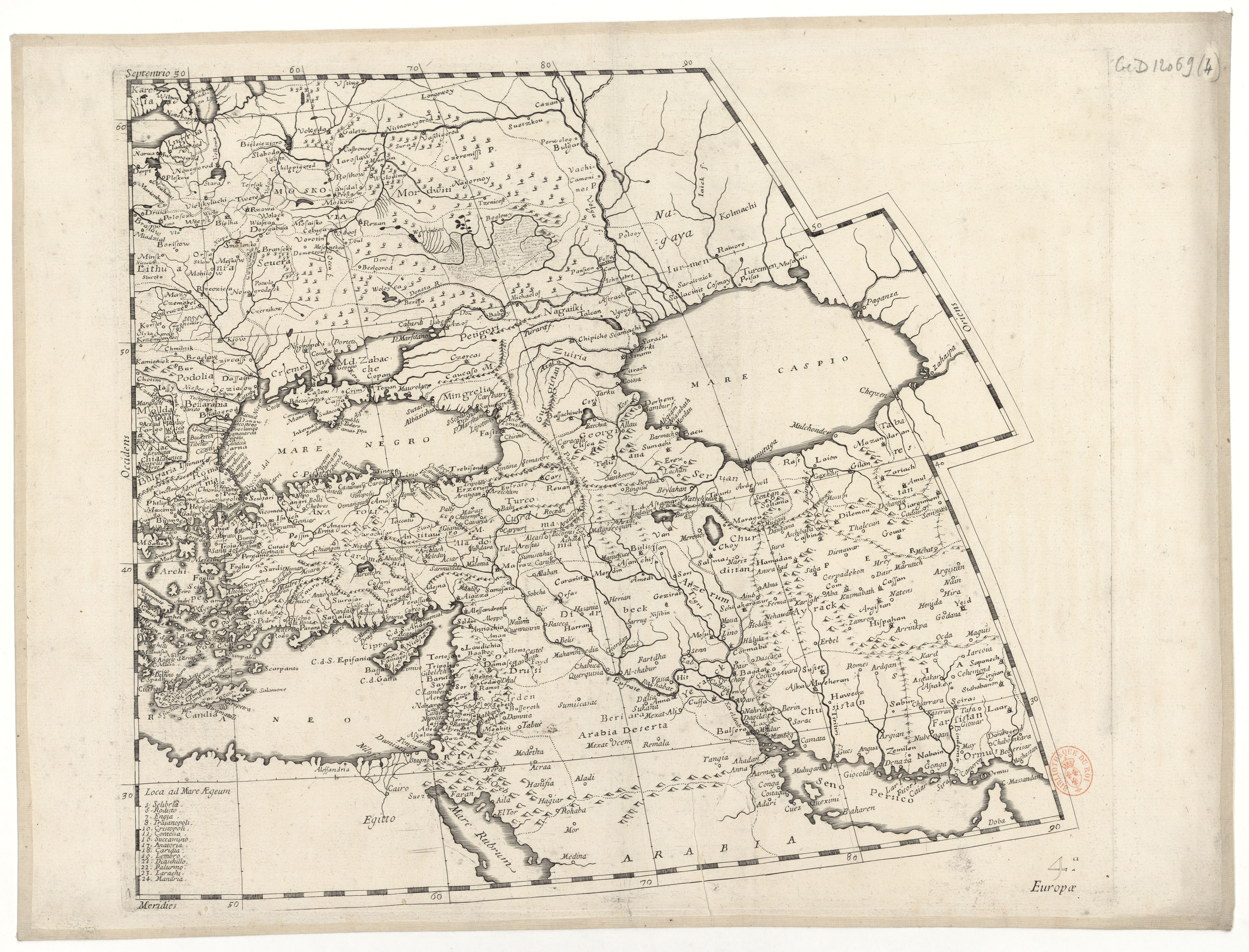
Nicolosi's map of Middle East, 1660, Département Cartes et plans, Bibliothèque nationale de France, Paris

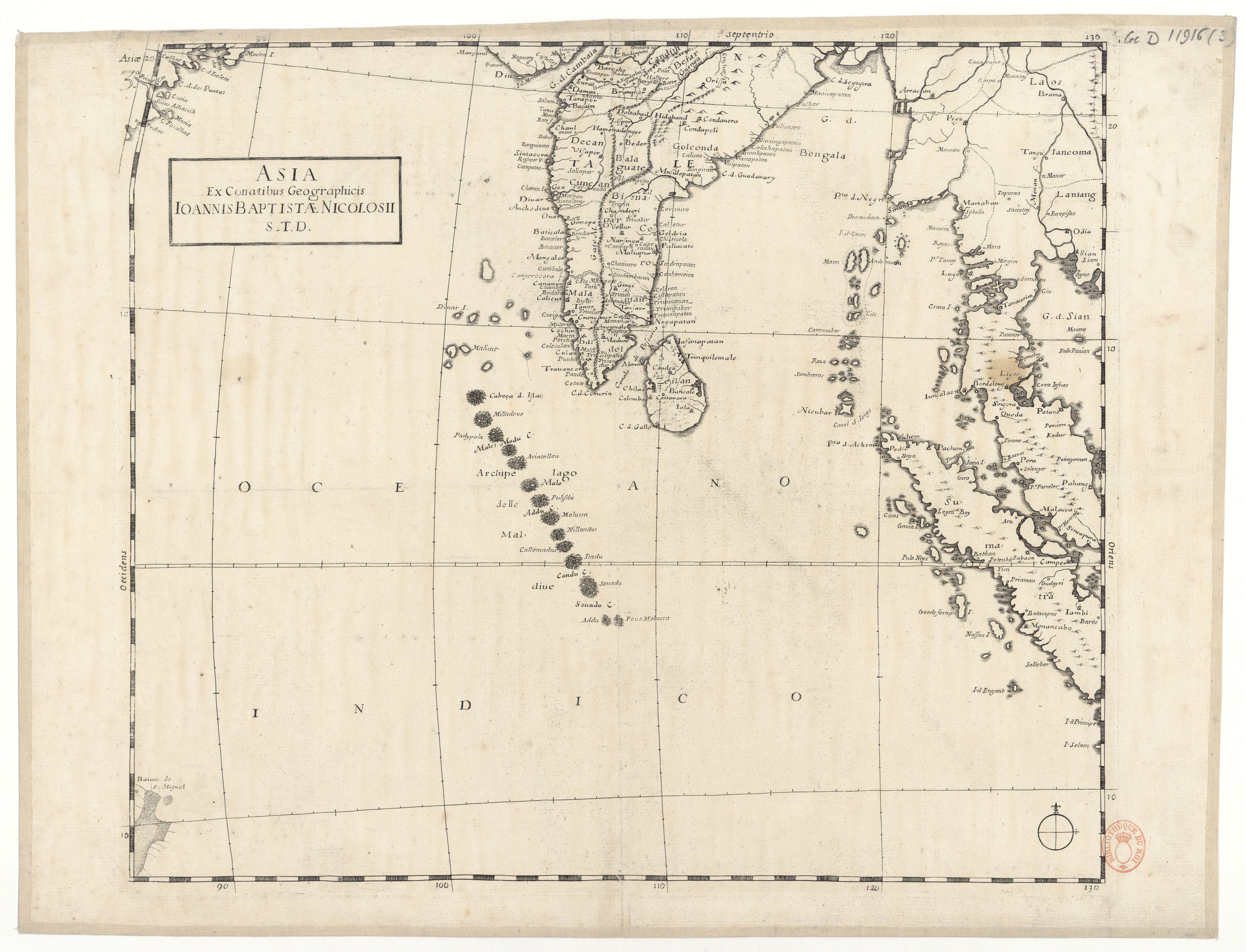
Indian subcontinent map by Nicolosi, 1660, Département Cartes et plans, Bibliothèque nationale de France, Paris

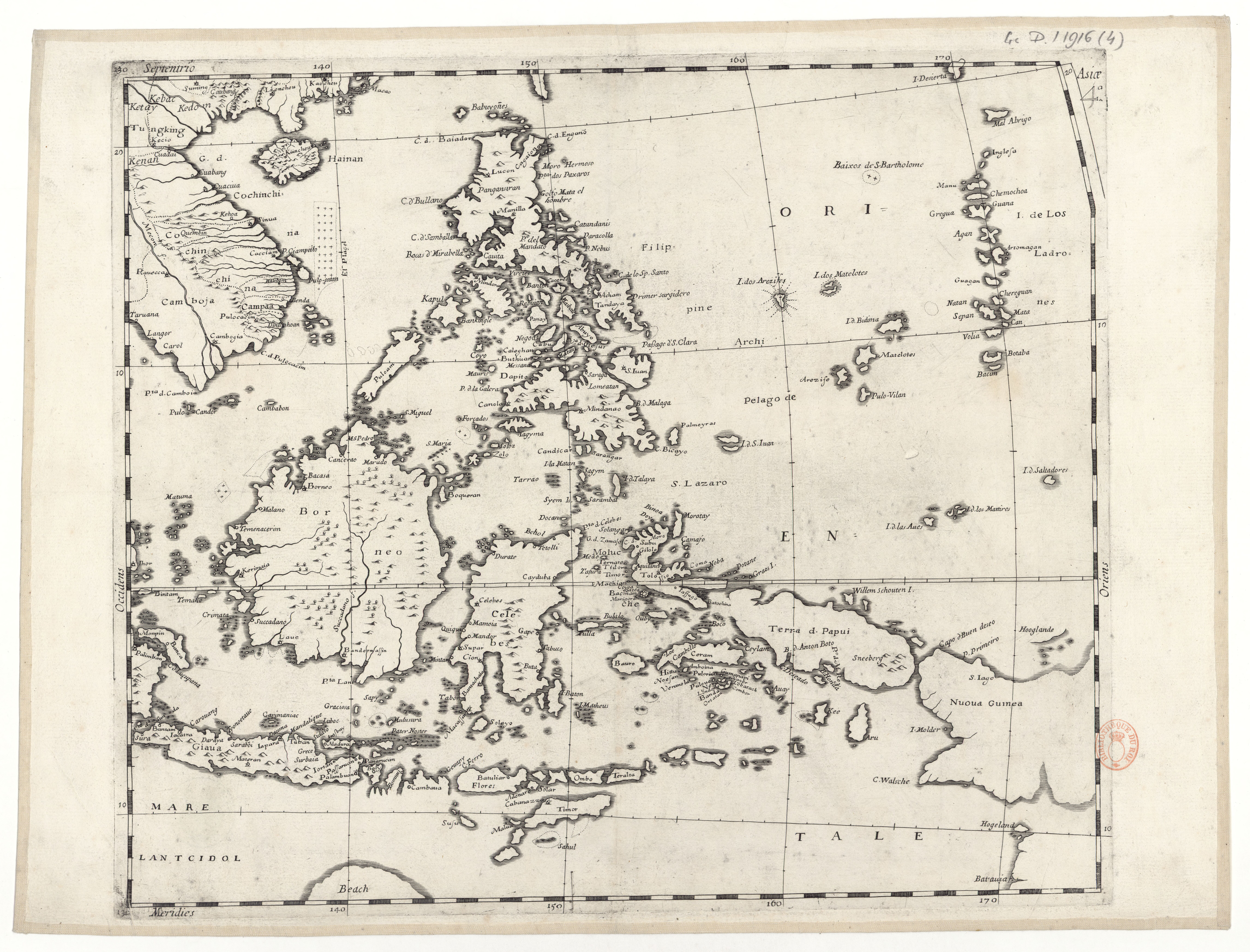
Nicolosi's map of Borneo, 1660, Département Cartes et plans, Bibliothèque nationale de France, Paris
