= Angelo Lo Jacono =

Italian writer and journalist

Angelo Lo Jacono (Paternò, 1838- Paterno, 29 December 1898) was an Italian writer and journalist.

== Biography ==
He studied at the Seminary of Catania, but he devoted himself later to literature.

Back in his birth town, he worked as a lawyer and published essays, tales and poems. He translated Virgil's Georgics into Italian language and worked for the farming publication L'agricoltore calabro-siculo.

== Publications ==
- Miscellanea Letteraria - Catania, Tipografia dell' Ateneo Siculo (1862)
- Le Georgiche di Virgilio tradotte in versi italiani - Catania (1863)
- Emmanuelide - Catania, Pastore (1879)

== Merits ==
Order of the Crown of Italy

== Bibliography ==
- S. Correnti - Paternò - Palermo, Nuova Trinacria, 1973.
- G. Savasta - Memorie storiche della città di Paternò - Catania, Galati, 1905.
