= Santuario Santa Maria della Consolazione, Paternò =

Italian church

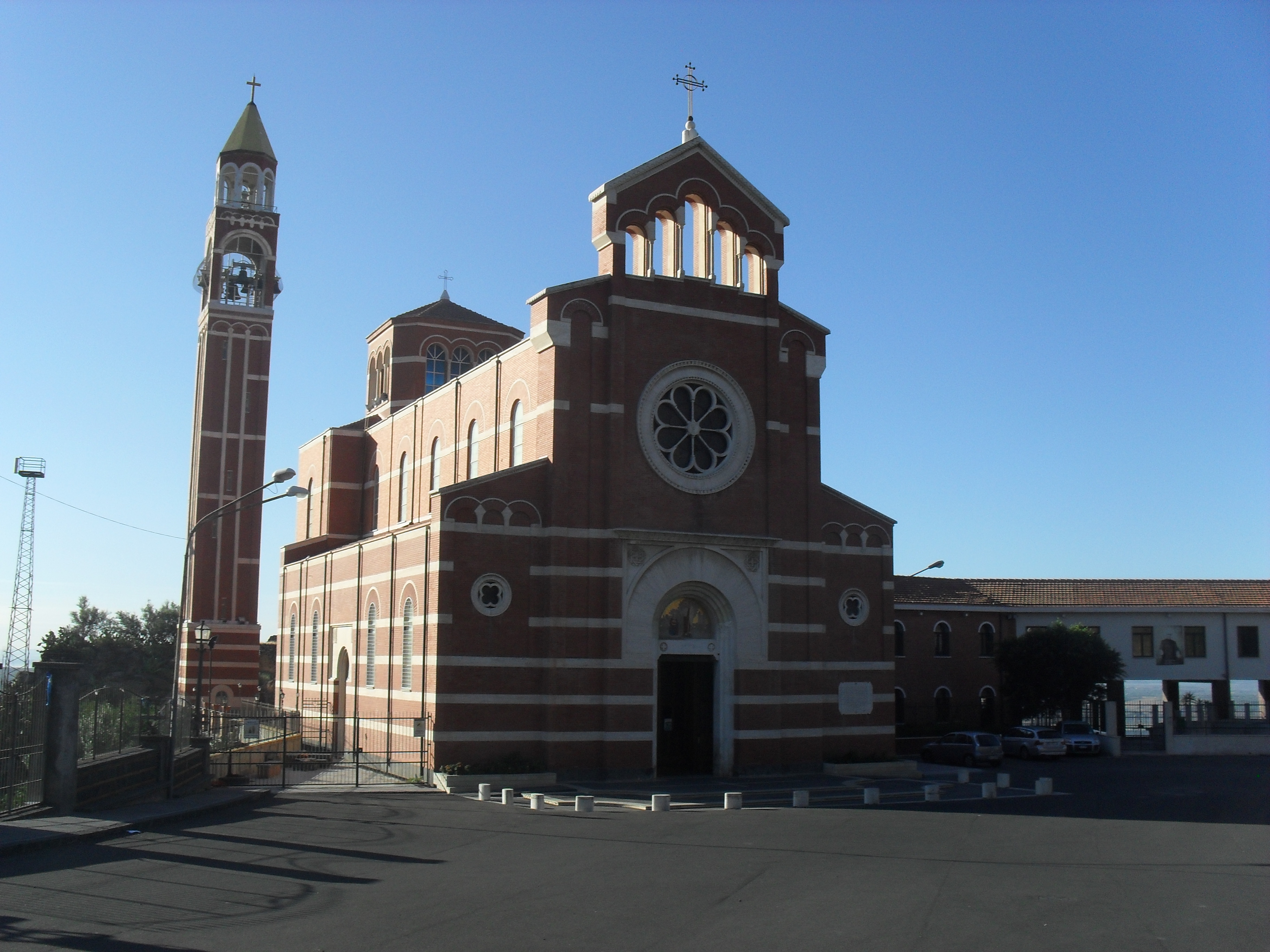
Sanctuary facade

The Sanctuary of Santa Maria della Consolazione (Italian: Santuario di Santa Maria della Consolazione) is a Roman Catholic Marian Sanctuary church located at the end of via Provvidenza Virgillito Providenza, on a hill-top South-West of Paternò in Sicily. It is also known as the Santuario della Madonna Santissima della Consolazione.

== History ==
A smaller church had been built at this site to honor a putative apparition in 1580 of the Virgin Mary to a young woman tending her goats in the field. Called the chapel of Santa Maria del Pietoso; in 1616, the named was changed to Maria SS. della Consolazione. In 1935, the church was made into a sanctuary by the archbishop of Catania. During World War II, the former church was nearly razed by bombardments. The present church, in a neo-Romanesque style, was not completed until 1954 under the patronage of Michelangelo Virgillito. The design of the present church was by the engineer Rosario La Russa. The interior has frescoes, painted against a Byzantine style gilded background, by Archimede Cirinnà. Other frescoes in church were by Antonio Majocchi.
