= Saint Catherine of Alexandria (Artemisia Gentileschi, Stockholm) =

Painting by Artemisia Gentileschi

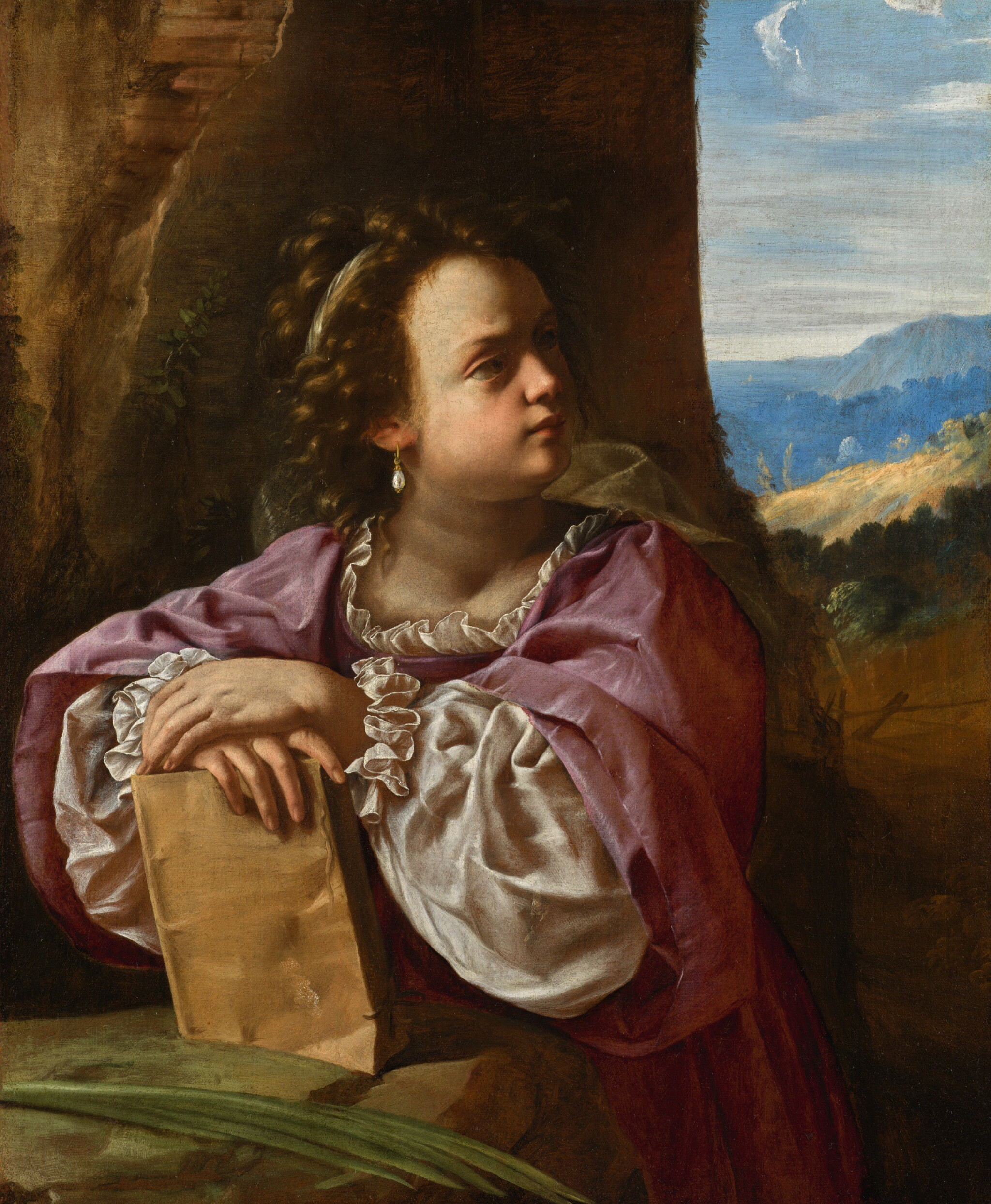
- Artist: Artemisia Gentileschi
- Year: circa 1627–1635
- Medium: Oil on canvas
- Movement: Baroque
- Dimensions: 90 cm × 75.4 cm (35 in × 29.7 in)
- Location: Nationalmuseum; Stockholm

Saint Catherine of Alexandria is an oil on canvas painting by the Italian Baroque artist Artemisia Gentileschi. It was painted around 1627–1635 and has been in the collection of the Nationalmuseum in Stockholm since 2020.

Artemisia Gentileschi was born in Rome and studied under her father Orazio Gentileschi, one of Caravaggio's early followers. From the Caravaggesque beginnings her style gradually changed to more graceful designs and a lighter palette tending toward Venetian colourism. She is known for her depictions of strong female figures from the Bible, Saint legends and Classical mythology, such as Judith, Bathsheba, Mary Magdalene and Susanna.

Catherine of Alexandria was an Egyptian virgin that martyred for her faith in the 4th century. Her individualised facial features and steady gaze bear witness to her courage. Her attributes are a book and a palm frond. Her purple silk dress indicates royal birth. The light, symbolizing divine inspiration, makes the strong figure stand out in sharp relief. The model is known from another painting by Gentileschi, Susanna and the Elders, which is part of the Royal Collection in Great Britain.

Gentileschi depicted Saint Catherine several times. A version dated circa 1614–1615, also called Saint Catherine of Alexandria, is in private possession and is currently on display at the National Museum in Oslo. She also painted Catherine with herself as a model (Self-Portrait as Saint Catherine of Alexandria from circa 1615–1617).

== Similar paintings by Gentileschi ==
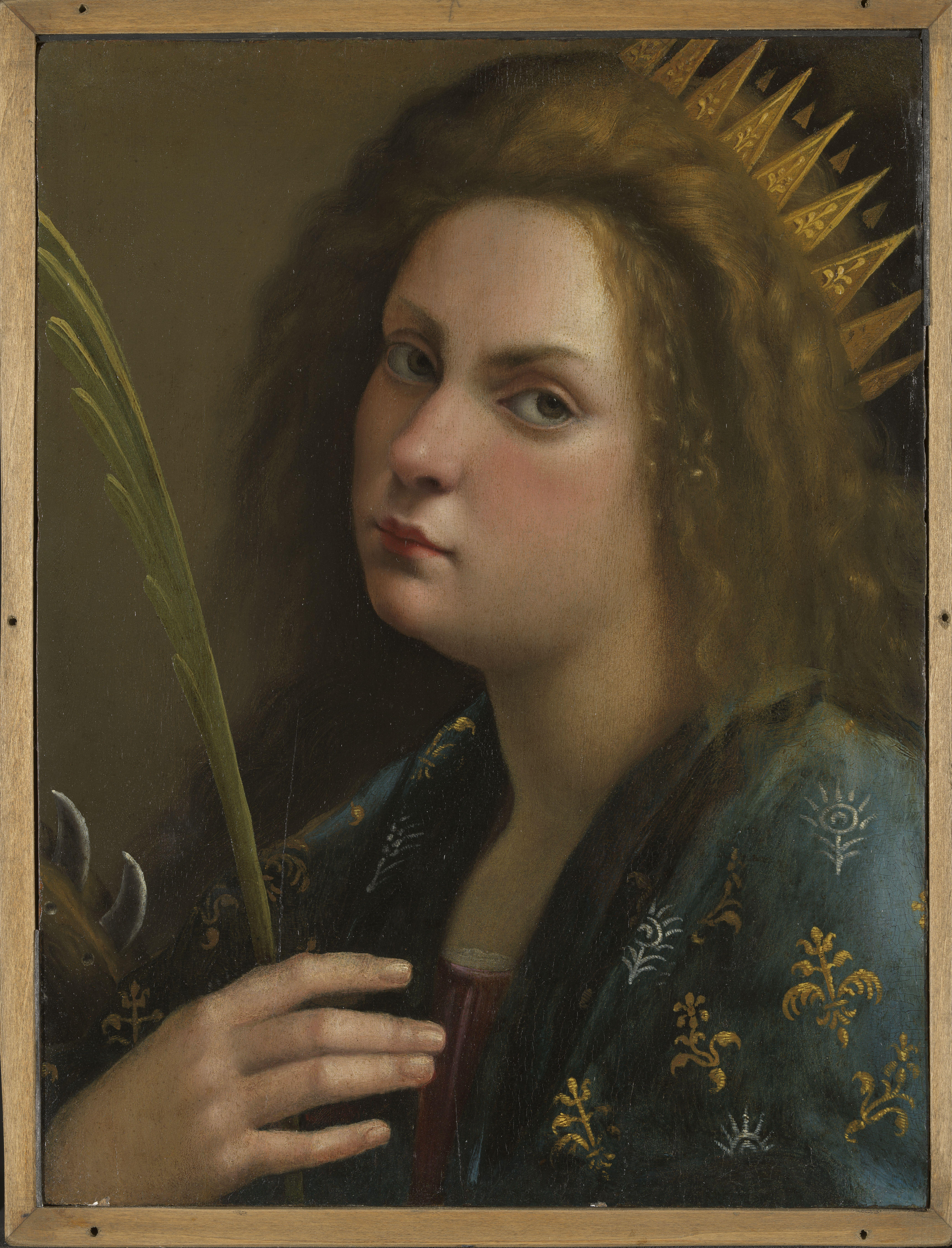
Saint Catherine of Alexandria is dated circa 1614–1615. It is in private possession and currently on display at the National Museum in Oslo.

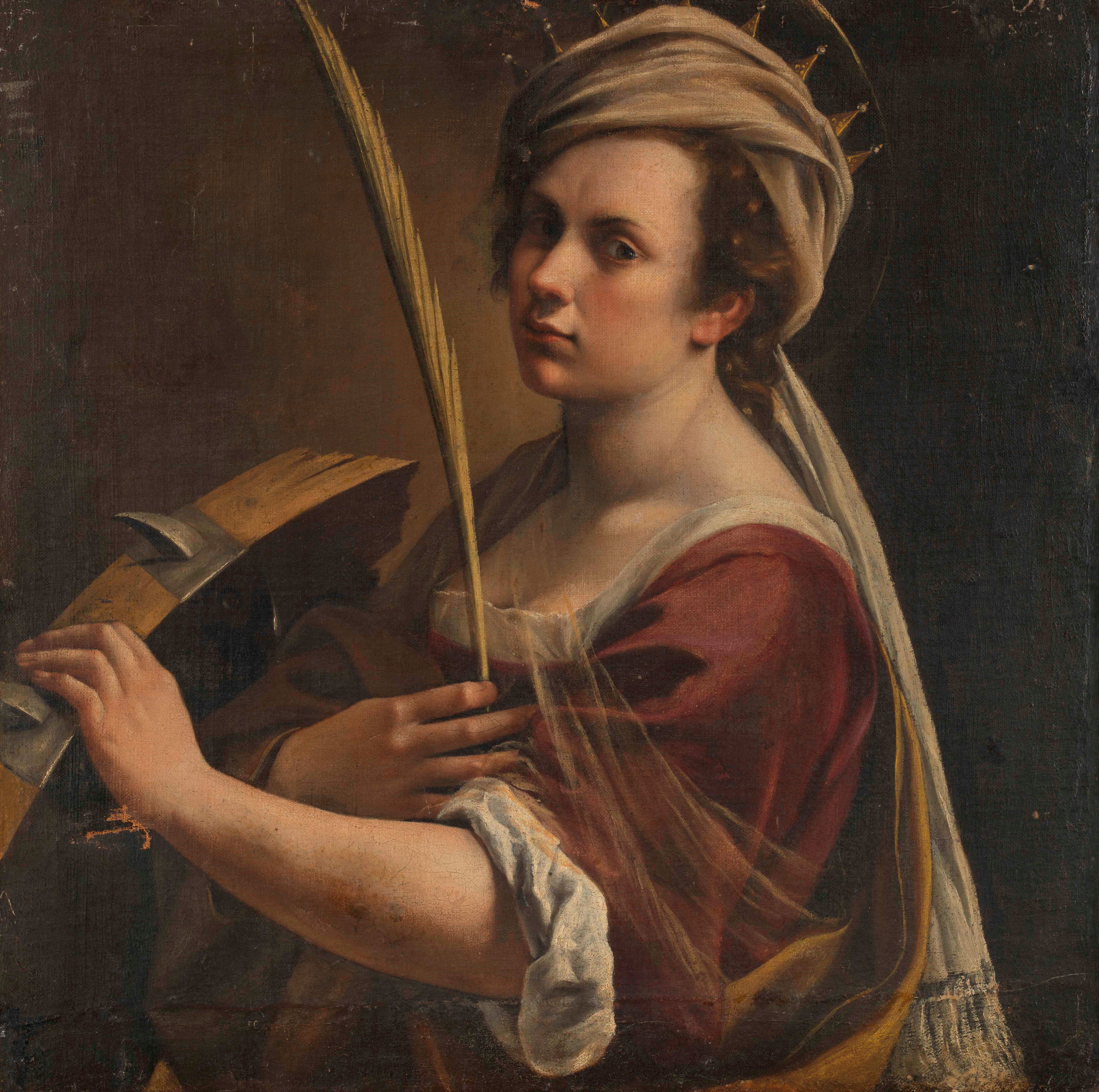
Self-Portrait as Saint Catherine of Alexandria (circa 1615–1617), National Gallery.

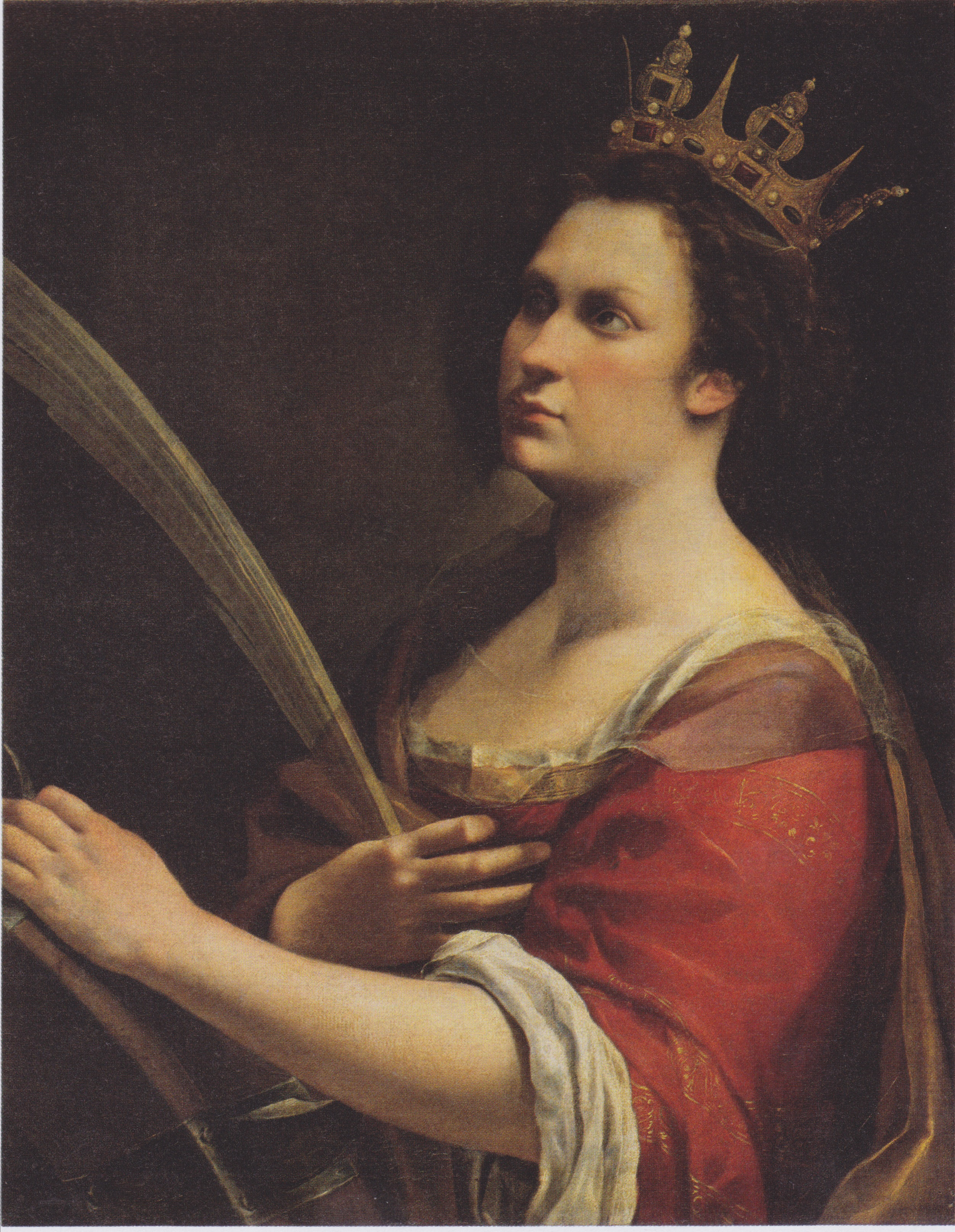
Saint Catherine of Alexandria (circa 1615–1617), Uffizi.

== See also ==
- List of works by Artemisia Gentileschi
