= Saint Catherine of Alexandria (Master Theodoric) =

Painting by Master Theodoric

Catherine of Alexandria
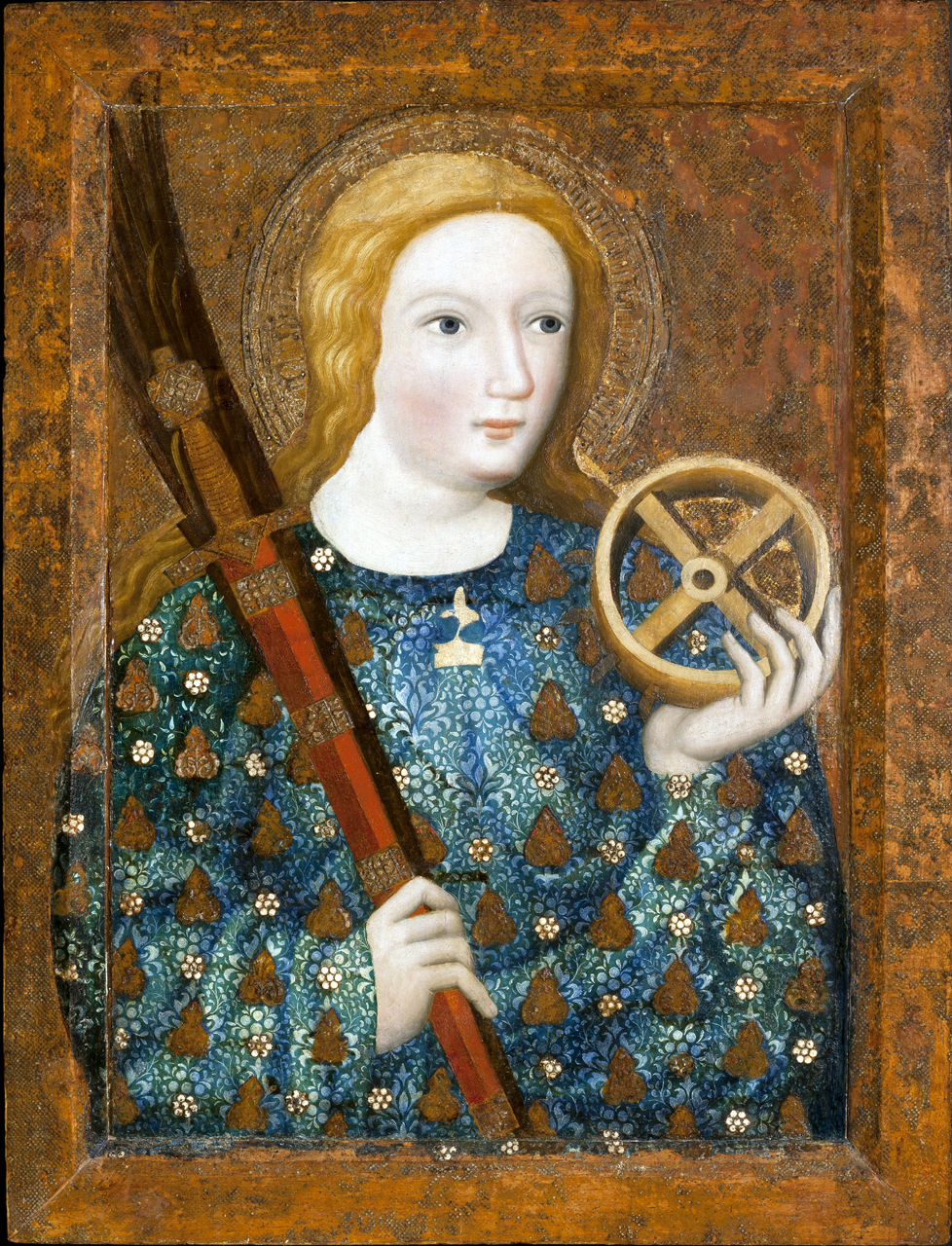
- Catherine of Alexandria (Master Theodoric)
- Artist: Master Theodoric
- Year: 1360 - 1365
- Medium: oil tempera on beech board
- Dimensions: 115 cm × 86.9 cm (45 in × 34.2 in)
- Location: National Gallery Prague, Prague

Saint Catherine of Alexandria is an oil tempera on beech board painting by Bohemian Gothic painter Master Theodoric. It stands out among Theodoric's paintings in the Chapel of the Holy Cross, especially for her richly decorated clothing. The painting is exhibited in the collection of medieval art of the National Gallery in Prague.

== Description and classification ==
The painting has the dimensions of 115 x 86.9 cm. The frame, decorated with the same printed decoration as the background of the painting, is original. The painting was restored in 1968 (R. Slánský) and in the 1980s (K. Veselý). Saint Catherine is holding the usual attributes - in her left hand a torture wheel with metal spikes, in her right hand a sword with which, according to legend, she was beheaded.

The delicate underdrawing, marking even the finest details, places the painting among the main group of Theodoric's paintings at Karlštejn. The painting of the face itself is slightly shifted from the original drawing and its features are similar to those of the Virgin Mary in the painting of Saint Anne with Mary and Christ Child. The whole group of saints, which is placed in the north-eastern niche of the presbytery in the Chapel of the Holy Cross, is characterised by the rich decoration of the drapery. St. Catherine's garment is one of the most elaborate among them, and in addition to the intricate and rich pattern of the robe itself, it is decorated with embossed appliqués. On a blue azurite ground, six-petalled flowers combined with stylized chrysanthemum are stencilled, accompanied by hand-painted trefoil leaves. The folds of the drapery are shaded in ultramarine blue with bone black. The saint originally had flowing hair flowing down her right shoulder. After repainting with azurite blue, the design on this part of the drapery was only approximately replicated. At the same time, the original green palm branch was painted brown and the sword in her right hand was painted red. The differences in the intensity of the hair painting from the forehead down suggest that the saint may have originally worn a crown or headdress. The pastiglia, with its motif of grapes and six-pointed rosettes, made from a mixture of chalk and glue, was cast in a pewter mould. It was attached to the base with oil glue with the addition of ochre and minium.

== Saint Catherine of Alexandria in the time of Charles IV ==
Saint Catherine was one of the most popular saints at the time of the painting's creation in the 14th century. She was the patron saint of scholars and students, as well as of the newly founded Charles University. She also had a special personal significance for Charles IV, because on the feast day of St. Catherine, 25 November, he fought a victorious battle at the castle of San Felice in northern Italy in 1332 as a young 16-year-old royal. In the richly decorated private oratory of Charles IV, adjacent to the Chapel of the Virgin Mary at Karlštejn, there is a mural of St Catherine on the right side of the altar mensa. This was probably the reason why this chapel, originally dedicated to the patron saint of Lombardy, St. Palmatius, is referred to in literature as the chapel of St. Catherine.

=== Saint Catherine of Alexandria in art ===
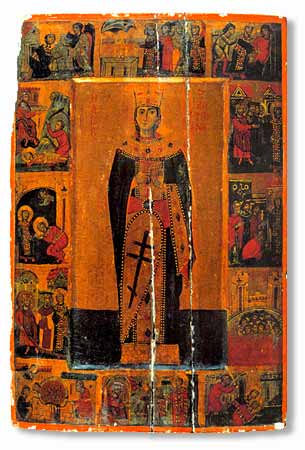
Icon of Saint Catherine of Alexandria (13th century)

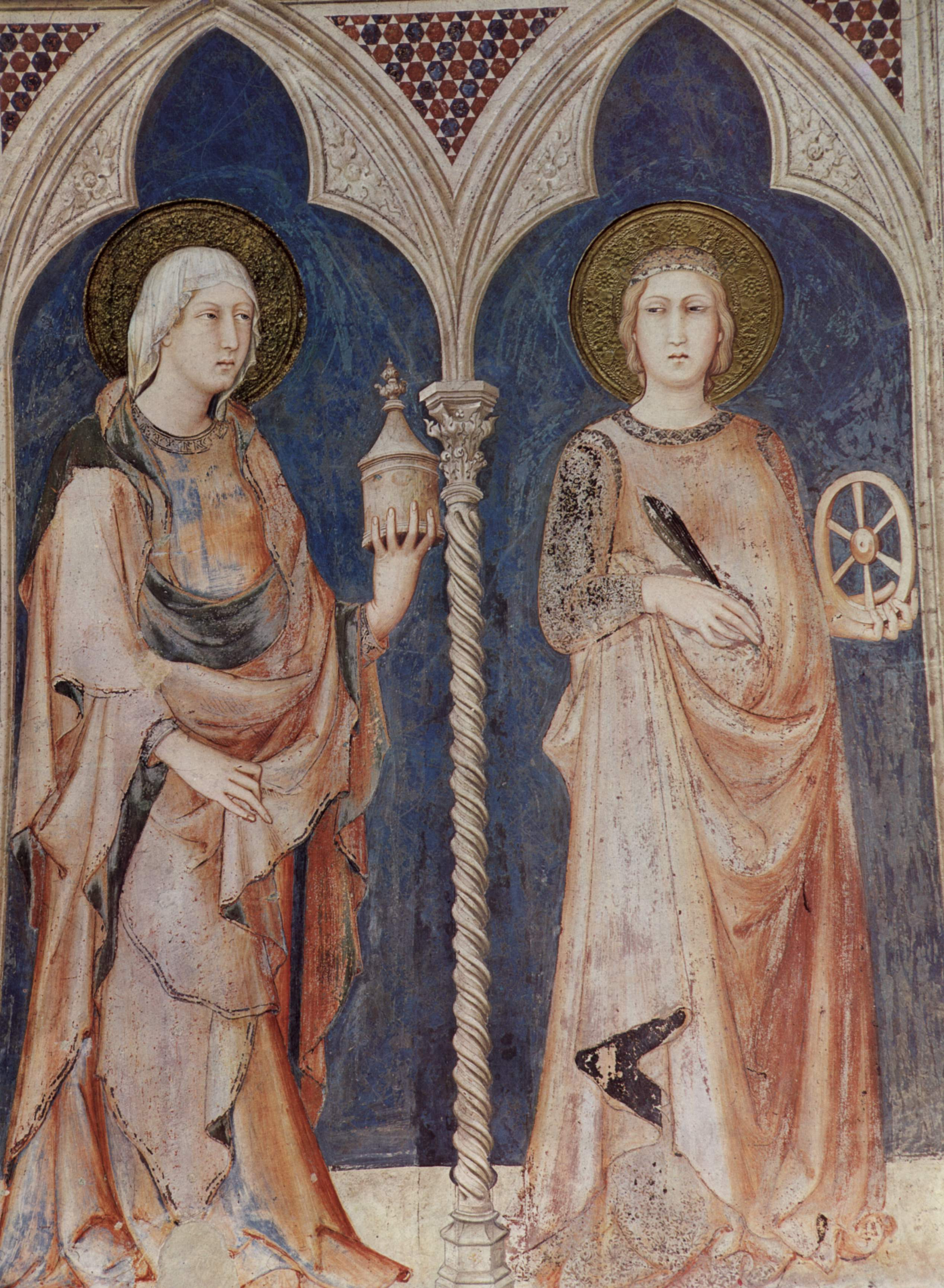
Simone Martini, Mary Magdalene and Saint Catherine of Alexandria (1322-1326)

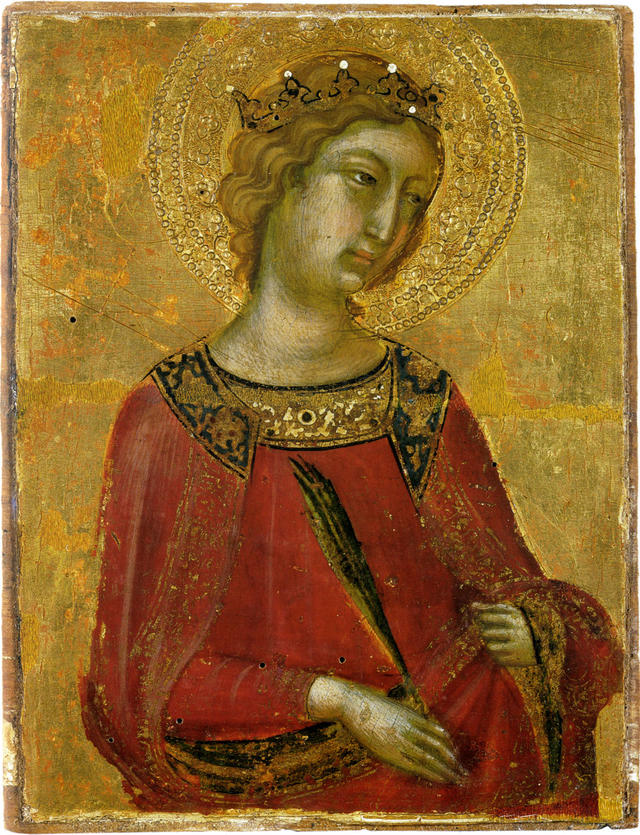
Niccolò di Segna, Saint Catherine of Alexandria (before 1348)

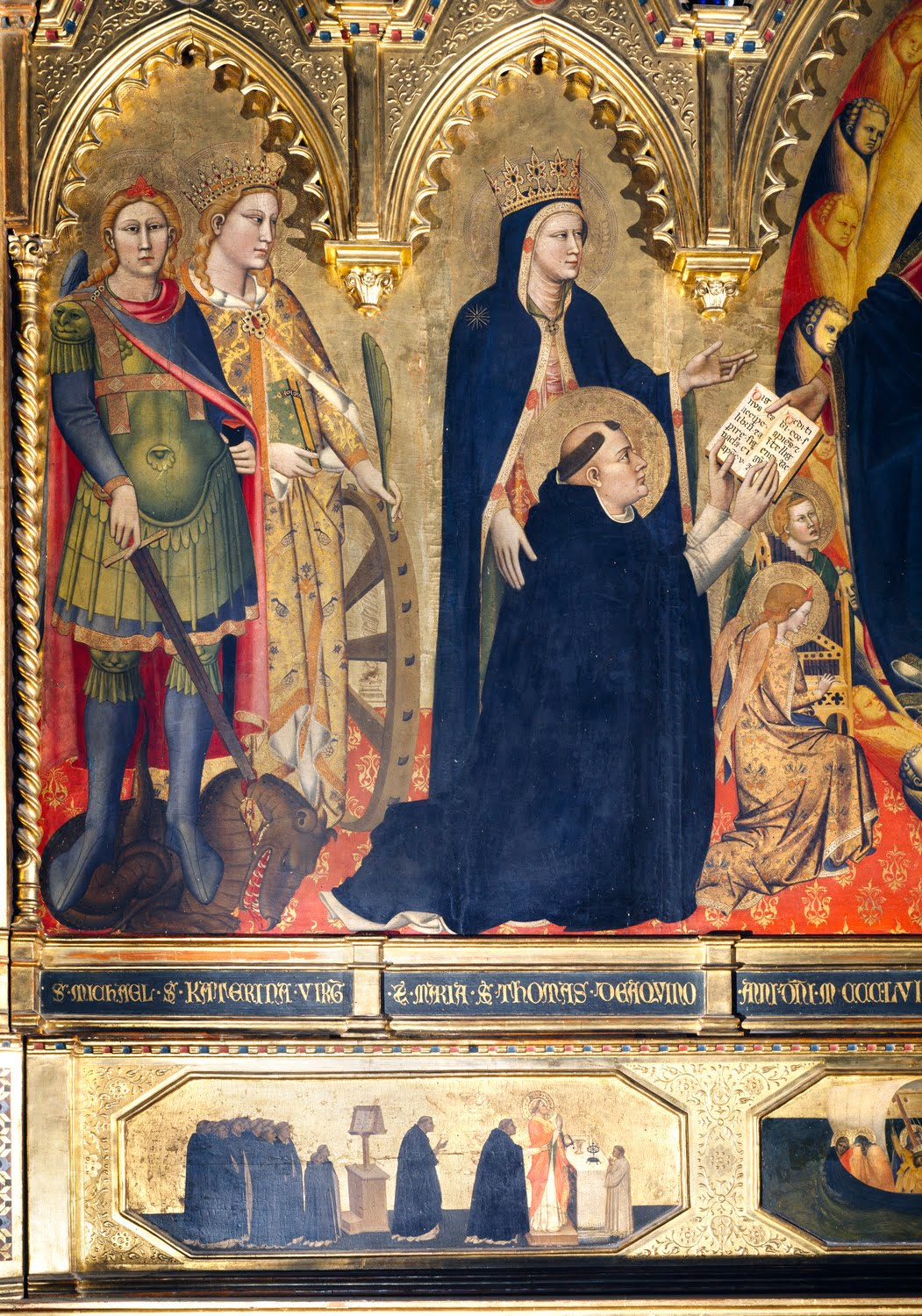
Andrea di Cione Orcagna, Strozzi Altarpiece (detail) 1354-57, Santa Maria Novella, Florence

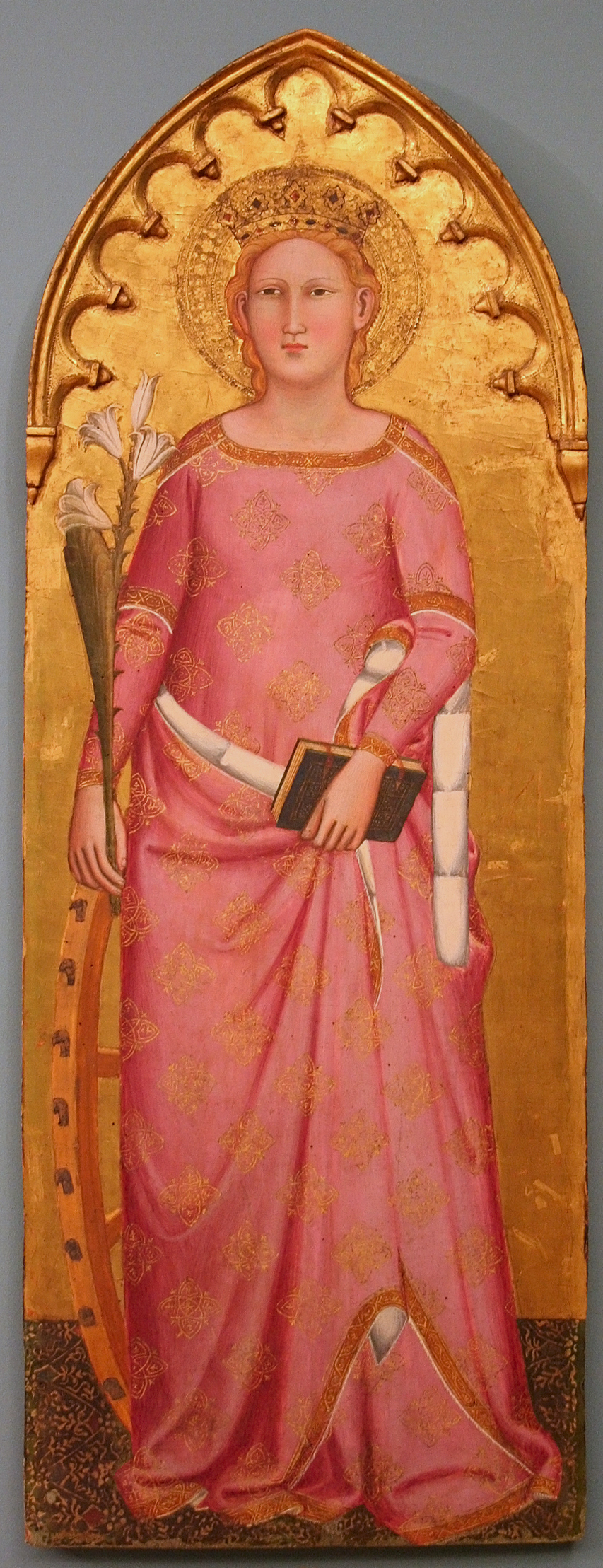
Pietro Nelli, Saint Catherine of Alexandria (1365)

== Sources ==
- Fajt Jiří, Chlumská Štěpánka, Bohemia and Central Europe 1200-1550, National Gallery in Prague 2014, ISBN 978-80-7035-569-5
- Jiří Fajt (ed.), Magister Theodoricus, court painter to Emperor Charles IV, National Gallery in Prague 1997, ISBN 80-7035-142-X
- Homolka Jaromír, Artistic decoration of the palace and smaller tower of Karlštejn Castle, pp. 95-154, in: Jiří Fajt, Magister Theodoricus, court painter to Emperor Charles IV, National Gallery in Prague 1997
- Grohmanová Zora, Survey of panel paintings from the Chapel of the Holy Cross, pp. 588-597, in: Jiří Fajt, Magister Theodoricus, court painter to Emperor Charles IV, National Gallery in Prague 1997
