= Santa Caterina d'Alessandria, Paternò =

Church building in Paternò, Italy

Coordinates: 37°33′57″N 14°53′47″E

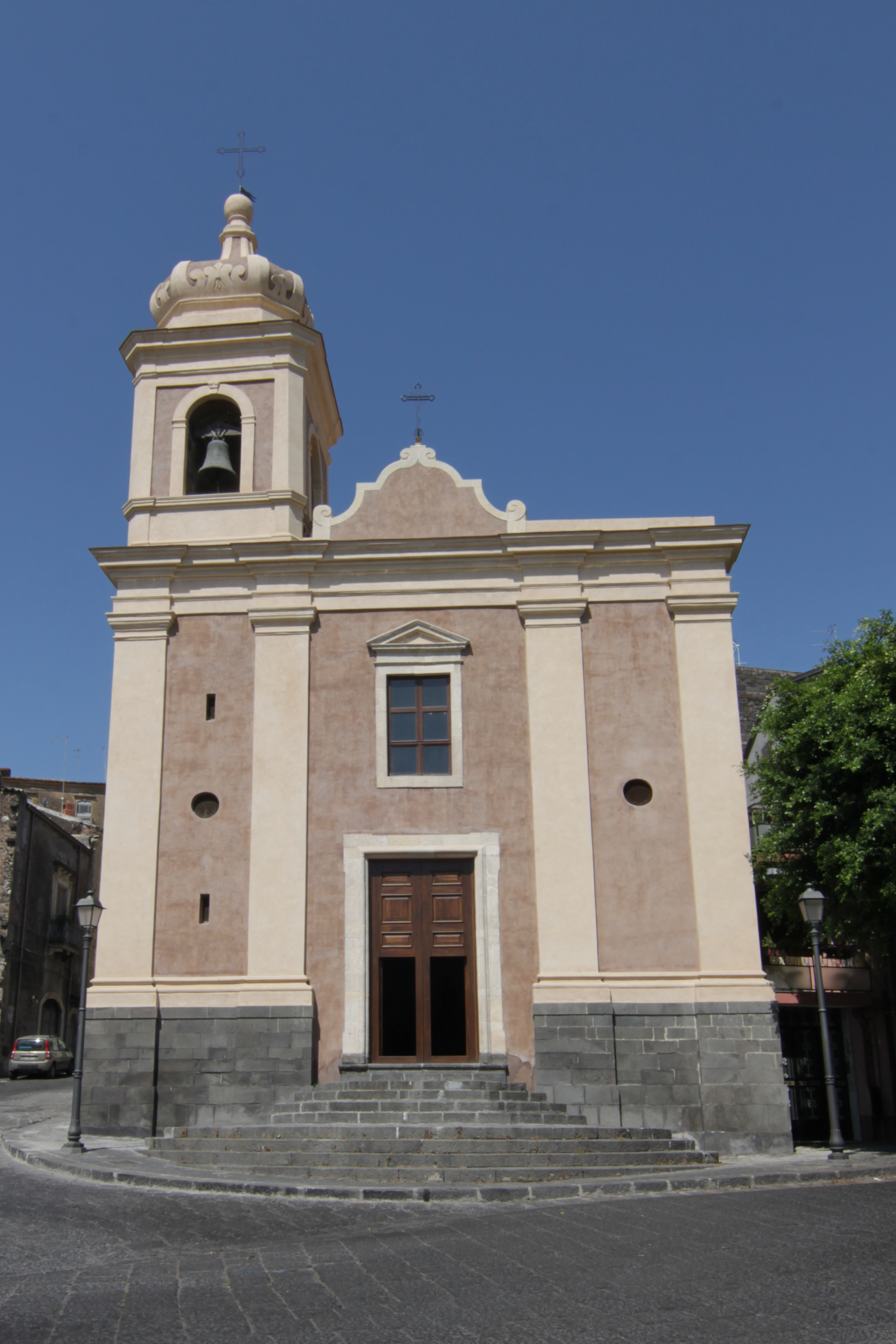
Facade of church with bell-tower

The Church of St Catherine of Alexandria (Italian: chiesa di Santa Caterina d'Alessandria) is a Roman Catholic church which takes up the most southern part of a wide area at the foot of the historic hill of Paternò in Sicily, near the Church of St Barbara and the former convent of St Annunziata.

== History ==
The church was built between 1725 and 1730 in order to replace a more ancient building, which dated back to the middle of 16th century, which was damaged by the earthquake of 1693; it had been the seat of the brotherhood since its birth in 1574. The new building was realised thanks to an amount of money given away by a priest, Giacinto Giglio, governor pro tempore of the brotherhood. The new seat was consecrated on 6 October 1730. Around the middle of the eighteenth century the facade and the bell-tower were built. Between 1774 and 1792 the marble altars were constructed, while the marble inlaid floor was constructed about 1803−04. The building was damaged by English air raids during the summer of 1943. Repairs were made in the years after the war. The church was damaged again by the earthquakes of 1990 and 2002. Thanks to the restoration work, funded by the Sicilian department of Civil Protection, it was reopened for worship. The church receives the adoration of Saints Alphius, Philadelphus and Cyrinus.

== Architecture ==
The building is of an octagonal structure, however the different length of the final parts of the passage which link the vestibule and the presbytery gives a pronounced longitudinal course. The hall is covered by a lunette cloister vault, which extends upwards. The church features a marble inlaid floor. The interior decoration consists of Tuscan pilasters that support the trabeation, on which stands the tambour. The pilasters turn into the ribs of the vault. This one is divided into eight slices whose center represents the Agnus Dei. On one side of the octagon there are a wooden confessional and a side exit. The four sides of the octagon receive altars. The main one was built with precious stone materials and stands over a raised platform. In the centre of the vestibule there is a double stone which allows people to enter inside the crypt, where centuries ago, the brothers were buried. The facade is set on a basalt base which is divided into three parts by four Tuscan pilasters. These support remarkable eves. In the central part of the facade there is a simple entry portal; above it you can see a window crowned by a triangulate tympanum. In the left part there are narrow loopholes and a circular window which illuminates the bell tower stairway. On the top of the tower is a small temple decorated by four one-light windows, one on each side. It is covered by a small dome equipped with pinnacles and it shows an octagonal plant, similar to the church.
