= Castello Normanno (Paternò) =

Coordinates: 37°33′56″N 14°53′37″E

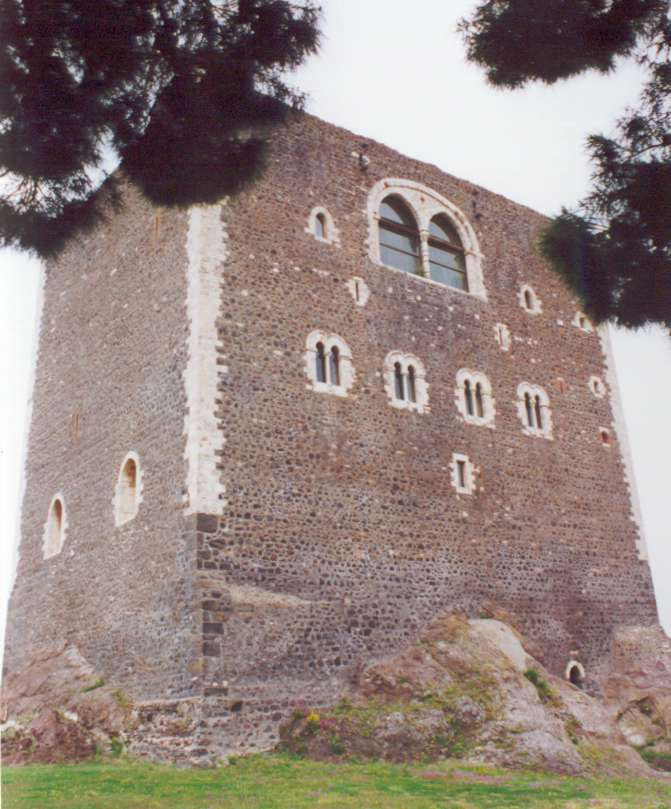
The Castello normanno.

The Castello normanno ("Norman Castle") is a castle in Paternò, in the Province of Catania, Sicily, southern Italy.

== History ==
The castle was built in 1072 by Count Roger I of Sicily to protect the Simeto valley from Islamic raids. Under Henry VI it was made the seat of the Count of Paternò, assigned to his fellow Swabian Bartholomew of Luci. Later the castle housed kings and queens, such as Henry's son Emperor Frederick II, Eleanor of Anjou and Blanche I of Navarre, as the castle had been included in the so-called Camera Reginale estates ("Queen's Chamber") by King Frederick III of Sicily.

The Chamber was abolished in the 15th century, and in 1431 the castle was acquired by the Speciale family; until 1456 it was owned by the Moncada family. Used as a jail, in the following centuries it became increasingly decayed, until restoration work begun in the 19th century brought it back to its ancient prominence.

== Description ==
The castle has a rectangular plan, on three floors, with a height of 34 m. Originally, it had Ghibelline-style merlons, of which today only remains can be seen. Notable is the colour effect created by the dark shade of the stones and the frames of the Gothic-style mullioned windows, in white limestone.

The first-storey houses several service chambers and the Chapel of St. John, decorated with precious 13th-century frescoes. The piano nobile houses a large Weapons Hall. The king's residence was located on the upper floor.
