= Nicolosi globular projection =

World map projection

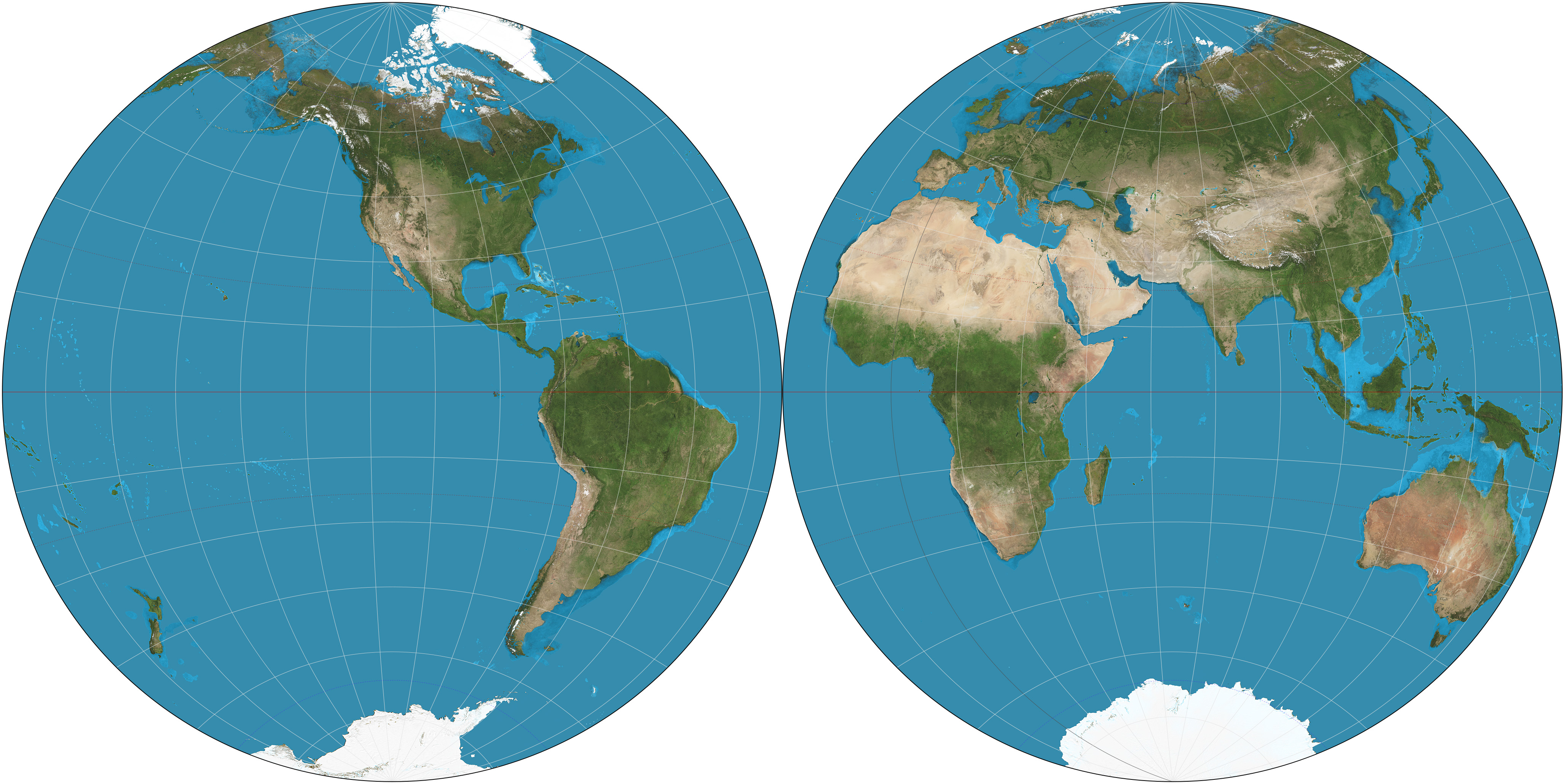
Hemispheres on the Nicolosi globular projection. 15° graticule, 115°W and 65°E central meridians. Imagery is a derivative of NASA's Blue Marble summer month composite with oceans lightened to enhance legibility and contrast. Image created with the Geocart map projection software.

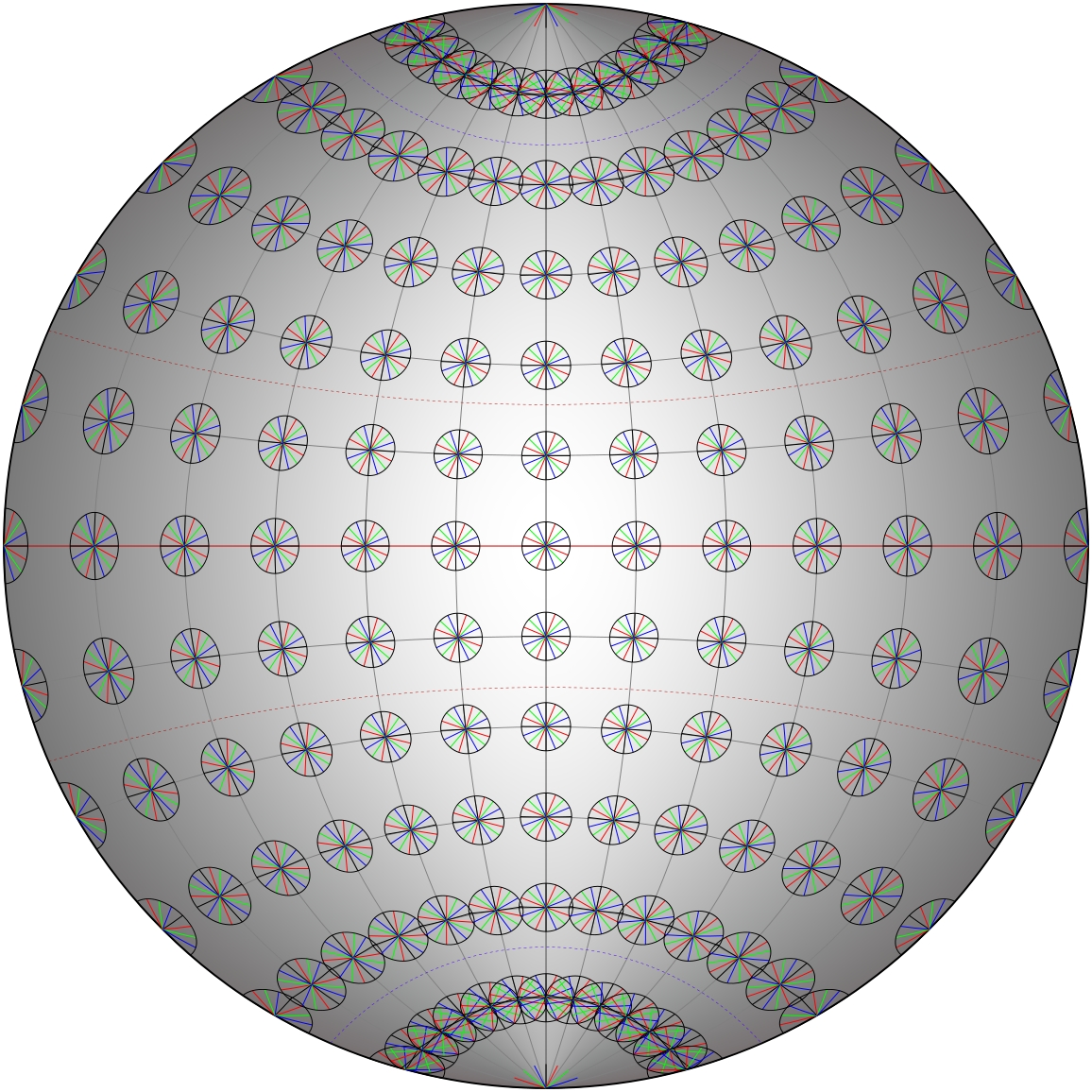
Nicolosi globular projection distortion. Deeper tint means more distortion. Neutral color means distortion is balanced between angular deformation and areal inflation. Tissot indicatrix at 15° intervals.

The Nicolosi globular projection is a polyconic map projection invented about the year 1000 by the Muslim Persian polymath al-Biruni. As a circular representation of a hemisphere, it is called globular because it evokes a globe. It can only display one hemisphere at a time and so normally appears as a "double hemispheric" presentation in world maps. The projection came into use in the Western world starting in 1660, reaching its most common use in the 19th century. As a "compromise" projection, it preserves no particular properties, instead giving a balance of distortions.

== History ==
Abū Rayḥān Muḥammad ibn Aḥmad Al-Bīrūnī, who was the foremost Muslim scholar of the Islamic Golden Age, invented the first recorded globular projection for use in celestial maps about the year 1000. Centuries later, as Europe entered its Age of Discovery, the demand for world maps increased rapidly, sparking a vast experimentation with diverse map projections. Globular projections were one category that received early attention, with inventions by Roger Bacon in the 13th century, Petrus Apianus in the 16th century, and also in the 16th century by French Jesuit priest Georges Fournier. In 1660, Giovanni Battista Nicolosi, a Sicilian chaplain in Rome, reinvented Al-Biruni's projection as a modification of Fournier's first projection. It is unlikely Nicolosi knew of al-Biruni's work, and Nicolosi's name is the one usually associated with the projection.

Nicolosi published a set of maps on the projection, one of the world in two hemispheres, and one each for the five known continents. Maps using the same projection appeared occasionally over the ensuing centuries, becoming relatively common in the 19th century as the stereographic projection fell out of common use for this purpose. Use of the Nicolosi projection continued into the early 20th century. It is rarely seen today.

== Description ==
The construction of the Nicolosi globular projection is fairly simple with compasses and straightedge. Given a bounding circle to fit the map into, the poles are placed at the top and bottom of the circle, and the central meridian of the desired hemisphere is drawn as a straight vertical diameter between them. The equator is drawn as a straight horizontal diameter. Each remaining meridian is drawn as a circular arc going through both poles and the equator, such that meridians are equally spaced along the equator. Each remaining parallel is also drawn as a circular arc from the left edge through the central meridian to the right edge of the circle, such that the parallels are equally spaced around the perimeter of the circle and also equally spaced along the central meridian.

A hemisphere shown with the Nicolosi globular projection closely resembles a hemisphere shown with the azimuthal equidistant projection centered on the same point. In both projections of that hemisphere, the meridians are equally spaced along the equator, and the parallels are equally spaced along the central meridian and also equally spaced along the perimeter of the circle.

Nicolosi developed the projection as a drafting technique. Translating that into mathematical formulae yields:

$$\begin{align}
b &= \frac{\pi}{2 \left(\lambda-\lambda_0 \right)} - \frac{2 \left(\lambda - \lambda_0 \right)}{\pi} \\
c &= \frac{2 \varphi}{\pi} \\
d &= \frac{1 - c^2}{\sin \varphi - c} \\
M &= \frac{\frac{b \sin \varphi}{d} - \frac{b}{2}}{1+\frac{b^2}{d^2}} \\
N &= \frac{\frac{d^2 \sin \varphi}{b^2} + \frac{d}{2}}{1+\frac{d^2}{b^2}} \\
x &= \frac{\pi}{2} R \left(M \pm \sqrt{M^2 + \frac{\cos^2 \varphi}{1 + \frac{b^2}{d^2}}}\right) \\
y &= \frac{\pi}{2} R \left(N \pm \sqrt{N^2 - \frac{\frac{d^2}{b^2}\sin^2 \varphi + d \sin \varphi - 1}{1 + \frac{d^2}{b^2}}} \right)
\end{align}$$

Angles here in radians are latitude $\varphi$, longitude $\lambda$ and the central longitude $\lambda_0$ for the hemisphere. $R$ is the radius of the globe to be projected.

In the formula for $x$, the $\pm$ sign takes the sign of $\lambda-\lambda_0$, i.e. take the positive root if $\lambda-\lambda_0$ is positive, or the negative root if $\lambda-\lambda_0$ is negative.

In the formula for $y$, the $\pm$ sign takes the opposite sign of $\varphi$, i.e. take the positive root if $\varphi$ is negative, or the negative root if $\varphi$ is positive.

Under certain circumstances, the full formulae fail. Use the following formulae instead:

When $\lambda-\lambda_0 = 0$,

$$\begin{align}
x &= 0 \\
y &= R \varphi
\end{align}$$

When $\varphi = 0$,

$$\begin{align}
x &= R \left(\lambda - \lambda_0 \right) \\
y &= 0
\end{align}$$

When $|\lambda - \lambda_0| = \frac{\pi}{2}$,

$$\begin{align}
x &= R \left(\lambda - \lambda_0 \right) \cos \varphi \\
y &= \frac{\pi}{2} R \sin \varphi
\end{align}$$

When $|\varphi| = \frac{\pi}{2}$,

$$\begin{align}
x &= 0 \\
y &= R \varphi
\end{align}$$

== See also ==
- List of map projections
