= Paternò =

Paternò Patinnò (Sicilian)
- Comune
- Città di Paternò
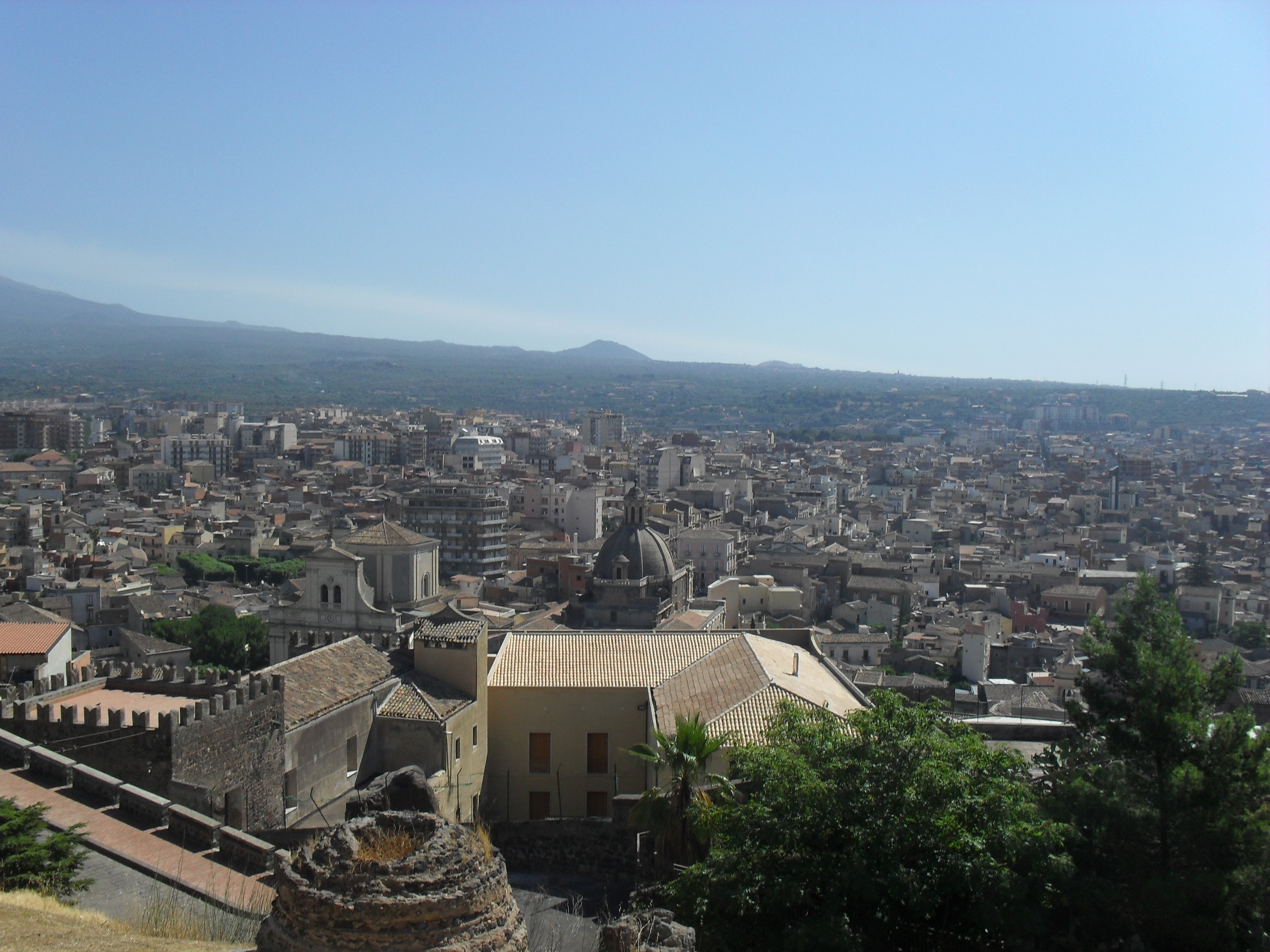

- Coat of arms

- Paternò within the Province of Catania

- Location within Italy Location within Sicily
- Coordinates: 37°34′N 14°54′E
- Country: Italy
- Region: Sicily
- Metropolitan city: Catania (CT)
- Frazioni: Sferro

Government
  - Mayor: Nino Naso

Area
  - Total: 144.68 km^{2} (55.86 sq mi)
- Elevation: 225 m (738 ft)

Population (2026)
  - Total: 44,502
  - Density: 307.59/km^{2} (796.65/sq mi)
- Demonym(s): Paternesi, Patornesi
- Time zone: UTC+1 (CET)
  - Summer (DST): UTC+2 (CEST)
- Postal code: 95047
- Dialing code: 095
- Patron saint: Santa Barbara and San Vincenzo Martyr
- Saint day: 4 December
- Website: www.comune.paterno.ct.it

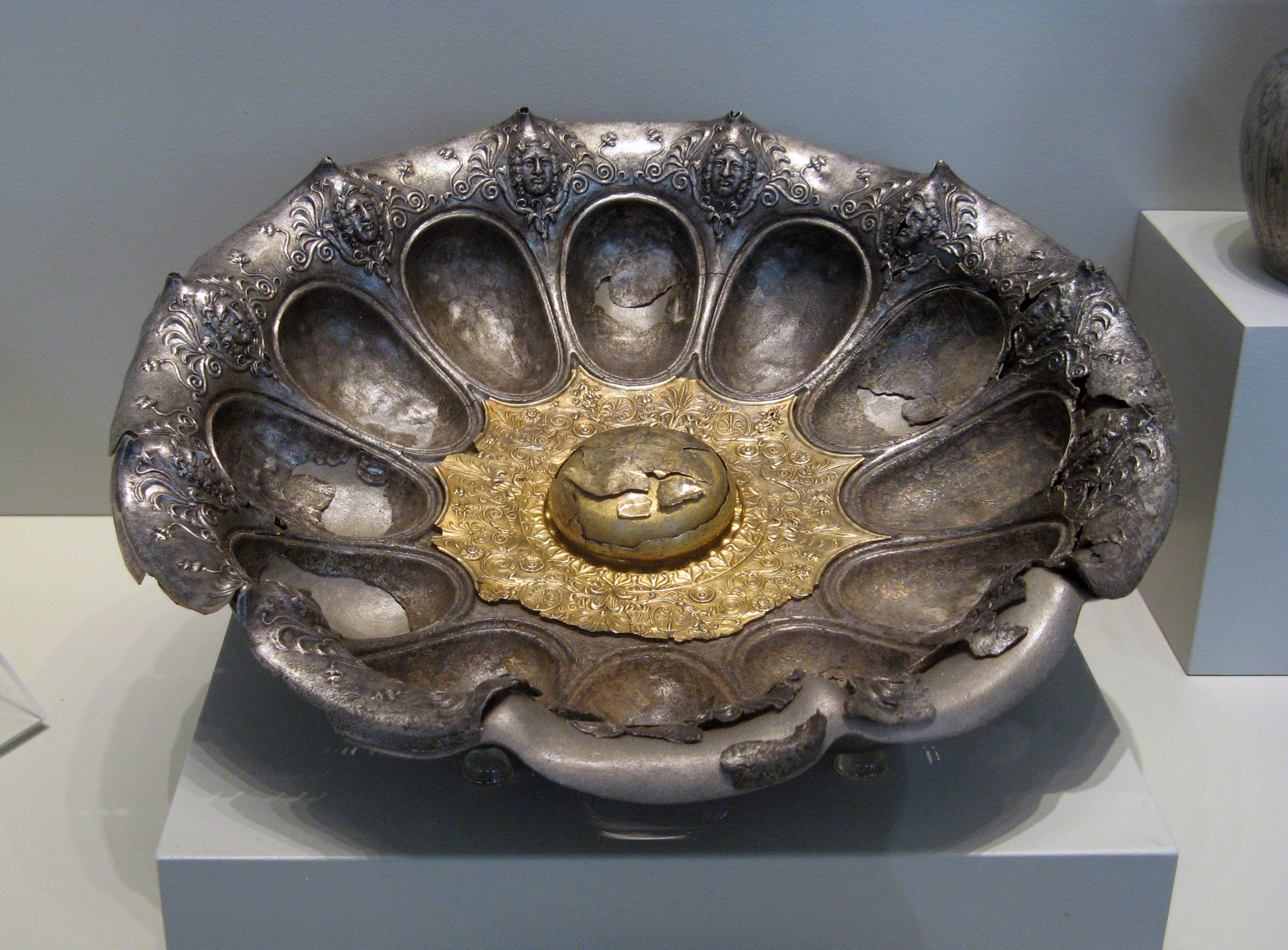
Silver and gold phiale from the Paternò Treasure, 4th century BC (Antikensammlung Berlin)

Paternò (Sicilian: Patirnò) is a city and comune (municipality) in the Metropolitan City of Catania, in the autonomous island region of Sicily in Italy. With a population of 44,502, it is the 4th-largest city of the province and the 17th-largest in Sicily.

== History ==
The site of Paternò was settled before 3500 BC. Its inhabitants were probably the Sicanians, although it was located in mainly Sicel territory. The modern name derives form the Greek Paeter Aitnaion, meaning the "Fortress of the Etnaeans".

Ancient historians refer to two contiguous or nearby cities of Sican origin: Hybla Gereatis and Inessa (later renamed Aetna). Most modern scholars regard the place called Castro as the site of Aetna, about 4 km (2.5 mi) northeast from Paternò, on a hill projecting from the foot of the mountain.

It was a centre of medium importance in the Greek and Roman eras.

Hybla and Inessa fell into Greek hands around 460 BC, when they were besieged by the Syracusans led by the tyrant Hieron I and the two centres were thus Hellenised. They were also involved in the wars between the Syracusans and the Athenians and devastated by the latter, and later again by the former in 403 BC when Dionysius I of Syracuse came to power; in 396 BC he sent mercenaries to Aetna from Campania who carried out numerous massacres of the population for favouring the Athenians in 415 BC. Aetna and Hybla together with the other cities of eastern Sicily were liberated in 339 BC by the Corinthians led by general Timoleon.

In 264 BC, the First Punic War broke out between the Carthaginians and the Romans and Aetna and Hybla sided with the former, but after their defeat the two villages fell inexorably under Roman domination. The Romans led by the consul Manius Otacilius Crassus entered Aetna around 243 BC and conquered 67 other Sicilian cities.

Sicily became a Roman province and suffered Roman tyranny and exploitation with the enslavement of its inhabitants. In 136 BC this led to the revolt led by Eunus and Cleone of Cilicia in the First Servile War. During this battle, Aetna served as a place of refuge for many rebels, but together with Hybla, it suffered the greatest damage at the end of the Second Servile War as agricultural and pastoral lands were damaged. The situation worsened further when Gaius Verres, praetor in Sicily in 73 BC, ordered extortion, robbery and violence of all kinds on the two towns, forcing them to deliver of 300 000 bushels of wheat and the payment of 50 000 sesterces.

Aetna and Hybla were included in the cities of civitates decumanae, liable to pay Rome the decuma tax of one tenth, and not enjoying the rights of other cities as they had been conquered after offering resistance.

The longest aqueduct in Roman Sicily at 24 km length passed through the territory close to the city on its route to Catania.

It was largely depopulated in the three centuries before 1000 AD; during the subsequent Arab domination of Sicily, it was known as Batarnù. After the Norman conquest in the 1040s, they built the castle and founded the current city; it was renamed Paternionis and began a period of flourishing. It was here that King Frederick III of Sicily created the Camera Reginale ("Queen's Chamber") as a wedding gift for his wife Eleanor of Anjou, and this was inherited by the subsequent Queens of Sicily. This period of splendour for Paternò lasted until the 15th century, when it became a fief and in consequence slowly lost importance.

Historically, the area around Paternò was plagued by malaria, caused by the marshlands of the Plain of Catania. This has since long been remedied, and the urban development of the town enjoyed a large acceleration in the 1960s and 1970s.

=== The Paternò Treasure ===
According to an account published in 1912 by the archaeologist Paolo Orsi, in the spring of 1909 a peasant woman digging near the Norman fortress at Paternò discovered a group of ancient silver vessels. Contemporary descriptions of the contents of the find vary, but it apparently consisted of at least 9 or 10 pieces, some of them gilded. The vessels were purchased for a low price by two men in Catania, who resold most of them to the antiquities dealers Cesare and Ercole Canessa in Paris. Legal proceedings against the two men, whom Orsi identified as Silvio Spoto and Antonio Capitano, came to nothing. The Canessa brothers had the vessels restored by Alfred André, and between 1911 and 1914 seven of them were acquired by Robert Zahn, curator of the Berlin Antikensammlung, with the help of the wealthy von Siemens family of Berlin. The seven pieces include three shallow cups or dishes with long handles, a small fluted cup, a large phiale with gold inlay, a cylindrical pyxis, and a second pyxis in the form of a scallop shell decorated with an octopus in relief.

The vessels have been dated to the 4th century BC, and chiefly to the second half of that century. Most of them are thought to have been produced in southern Italy, especially in the region around Tarentum, but stylistic parallels with objects produced around Syracuse and in Thrace have also been suggested for individual pieces. Six of the seven vessels in Berlin have punched inscriptions. These were apparently made at different times and name three or four different people, which suggests that the collection may have passed through several hands before its final deposition at Paternò in the 3rd century BC. Although written in Greek letters, some of the inscriptions may be Hellenized versions of Latin or Oscan names.

== Geography ==
Paternò borders with the municipalities of Belpasso, Biancavilla, Catenanuova (EN), Centuripe (EN), Ragalna, Ramacca and Santa Maria di Licodia. Its only hamlet (frazione) is the village of Sferro.

Within Paterno there is a geologic feature named Salinelle, a place where small mud volcanoes emerge from cracks in the ground. This area in which the Salinelle surfaces includes an archeological site currently uncovering evidence of Roman baths previously built on and thought to have used the Salinelle mud.

== Demographics ==
Historical population
Year	Pop.	±%
1861	14,219	—
1871	14,920	+4.9%
1881	16,233	+8.8%
1901	21,282	+31.1%
1911	27,059	+27.1%
1921	32,212	+19.0%
1931	28,105	−12.7%
1936	30,021	+6.8%
1951	34,264	+14.1%
1961	40,899	+19.4%
1971	41,830	+2.3%
1981	43,432	+3.8%
1991	44,266	+1.9%
2001	45,725	+3.3%
2011	47,870	+4.7%
2021	45,539	−4.9%
Source: ISTAT

As of 2026, the population is 44,502, of which 48.8% are male, and 51.2% are female. Minors make up 17.5% of the population, and seniors make up 21.9%.

=== Immigration ===
As of 2025, of the known countries of birth of 44,573 residents, the most numerous are: Italy (43,170 – 96.9%), Germany (497 – 1.1%), Romania (395 – 0.9%).

== Main sights ==
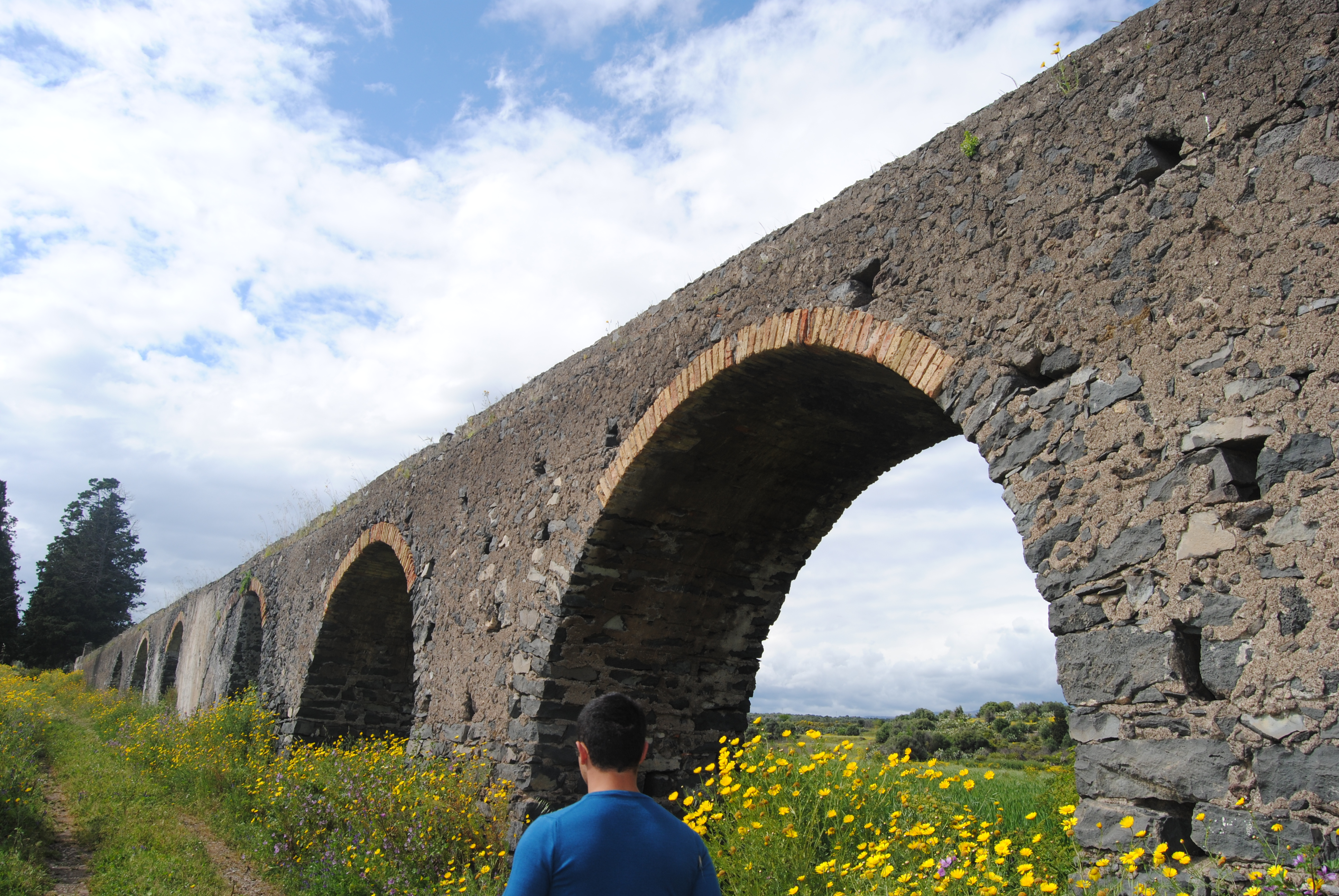
Catania Aqueduct at Valcorrente

- Norman Castle, built in 1072 by order of Roger I of Sicily
- Santa Maria dell'Alto, Mother Church (Chiesa Madre) of the town, built in 1342 and largely modified in the early 18th century. It is connected by a scenic staircase to the Porta del Borgo.
- San Francesco alla Collina (1346), with a church in Gothic style and remains of Baroque decorations
- Rococo church of Cristo al Monte
- Santa Caterina d'Alessandria
- Santa Maria della Valle di Iosaphat, commissioned in 1072 by Adelaide del Vasto, with a Gothic portal
- Associazione Culturale Paternesi.com, a cultural association born in November 2002, from an idea of Giorgio Ciancitto, to take care of the city of Paternò around the world
- Sanctuary of the Madonna Santissima della Consolazione
- The Paternò Salinelle site

== Transport ==
Paternò is served by three state roads leading to Catania, Randazzo and Troina areas.

The train station was originally used mostly for food transportation, and is now out of service. The main passenger station is part of the narrow-gauge Ferrovia Circumetnea. The latter also provides a regular bus service to destination on the Catania-Adrano line.

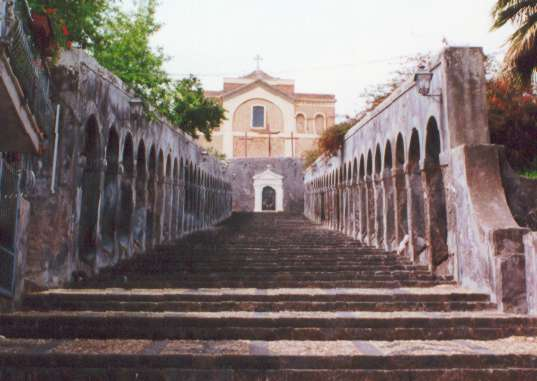
The steps of the Mother Church of Santa Maria dell'Alto

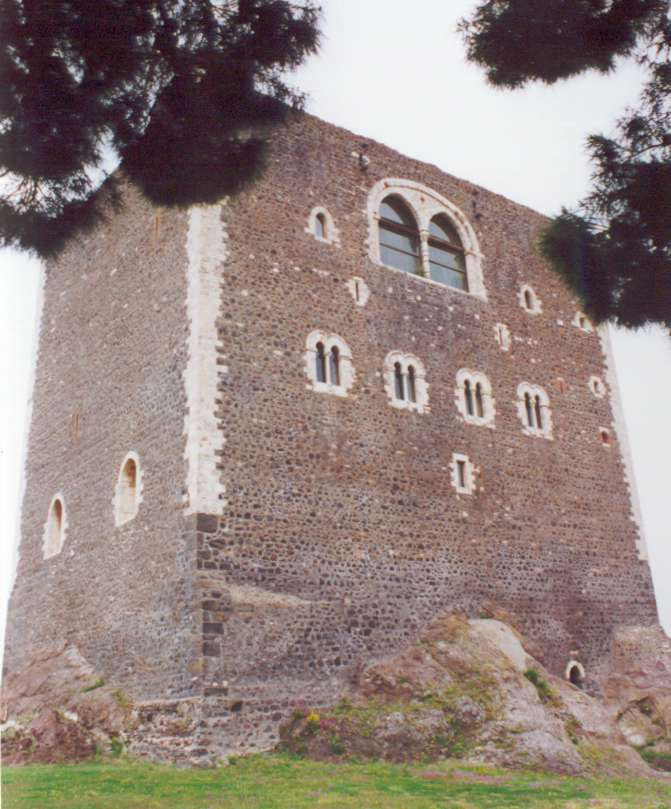
The Norman Castle

== Notable people ==
- Ciccio Busacca (1925–1989), Italian story-singer
- Angelo Lo Jacono (1838–1898), Italian writer and journalist
- Margareth Madè (born 1982), Italian actress
- Giovan Battista Nicolosi, D.D. (1610–1670), Italian priest and geographer
- Luca Parmitano (born 1976), Italian astronaut

== Twin towns ==
Paternò is twinned with:

- Santa Barbara, United States, since 1978
- Sesto Fiorentino, Italy, since 1981
- Menden, Germany, since 1987
