= Galatolo Mafia clan =

Mafia clan

- Founded: 1950s
- Founding location: Palermo
- Years active: 1950s–2014
- Territory: Acquasanta neighborhood in Palermo
- Activities: drug trafficking, extortion, murder
- Allies: Corleonesi (1980s)
- Rivals: Cavataio Mafia clan (1950s); Greco, Bontade and Sorci Mafia clans (1950s and 1980s)

The Galatolo Mafia clan was a criminal family originating from the Acquasanta neighborhood of Palermo. They are one of the longest-running Mafia clans in the city, having held important positions throughout most of the 20th century and beyond and even coming to rule the entire Resuttana mandamento in the early 21st century.

== Palermo wholesale market war ==
The Galatolo clan hailed from the Acquasanta neighborhood of Palermo, a particularly important region for Cosa Nostra because the Mafia clan in the Acquasanta controlled the docks of Palermo that were situated in their area. The most famous member of this clan was Gaetano Galatolo, better known by his nickname Tanu Alati. He had managed to become the boss of the Acquasanta family by the mid 1950s. The Galatolo clan were protagonist in the violent conflict about the Palermo fruit and vegetable wholesale market that was moved from the Zisa area to Acquasanta near the port in January 1955, disturbing the delicate power balances within Cosa Nostra. The Acquasanta Mafia clan tried to muscle in on the protection racket that traditionally belonged the "Mafia of the Gardens" — such as the Greco, Bontade and Sorci clans from the southeast of Palermo – because it now fell under their territory.

The Galatolo clan was devastated by the war, because of betrayal within the ranks of the Acquasanta family. An up and coming member of the Acquasanta family, Michele Cavataio, together with other mafiosi, took advantage of the situation to eliminate the top ranks of the Galatolo clan and assume control for himself. Tanu Alati survived a first assassination attempt in February 1955, which cost the life of his close ally Angelo Bonomo. Three months later, in May, Gaetano Galatolo was killed by machinegun fire on the day of his birthday while in the wholesale market. The killers were Michele Cavataio and Salvatore Licandri, who was killed a few days later by Cavataio to hide his responsibility in the murder. This murder was followed by killings of many of Galatolo's friends and relatives, including his brothers Natale and Angelo and his nephew Salvatore Munafò.

In the end, Cavataio and some his allies were arrested for this string of murders, but were soon released due to lack of evidence. The Galatolo clan entered a deep crisis following the deaths of many of its members, and Cavataio became the new boss of the clan but had to agree to split the profits of the wholesale market racket with his enemies in the southeast of the city, who traditionally controlled fruit and vegetable supply to the Palermo wholesale market. The war came to an end as the Sicilian Mafia re-organized itself under a Commission, following the 1957 Palermo Mafia summit between American and Sicilian bosses.

== Re-emergence ==
In the early 1960s, Michele Cavataio would launch a new war on the Greco and Bontade clans, culminating in the infamous Ciaculli massacre where seven police and military officers sent to defuse a car bomb after an anonymous phone call died. The outrage over the Ciaculli massacre changed the Mafia war into a war against the Mafia. It prompted the first concerted anti-Mafia efforts by the state in post-war Italy. The Sicilian Mafia Commission was dissolved and of those mafiosi who had escaped arrest many went abroad. After the trials against the Mafia concluded with almost no convictions in the late 1960s, the leaders of Cosa Nostra met in Zürich and decided to eliminate Cavataio and his closest allies as punishment for the war and massacres. Cavataio was killed on 10 December 1969, in the Viale Lazio massacre. Antonino Matranga, capomandamento of Resuttana and Cavataio's closest ally in the commission, was killed on 30 April of the following year in Milan.

The resulting power vacuum allowed the Galatolo clan, after an absence of more than a decade, to get back into power in the Acquasanta family. Vincenzo Galatolo, a nephew of Tanu Alati, became the new boss of the family in the 1970s. Vincenzo Galatolo was nicknamed "Buicennu", meaning ox face, but also "Enzo Alati", in honor of his late uncle. The Galatolos were able to once again take control of the protection racket of the docks thanks to several businessmen with ties to the clan. Vincenzo Galatolo's rise to power coincided with that of Francesco Madonia of the Resuttana Mafia family. Both Galatolo and Madonia soon became close to the up and rising faction of the Corleonesi, ruled by Salvatore Riina, which were expanding their power base in Palermo around this time. However, their territory was initially under the jurisdiction of the Partanna-Mondello mandamento ruled by Rosario Riccobono, appointed to the position after the abolishment of the Resuttana and San Lorenzo mandamenti in the aftermath of the First Mafia War. Riccobono had been appointed with the strong support of Salvatore Greco and Stefano Bontade, the Galatolos' old foes, who by this point were also considered enemies by Riina. In 1977, Riina succeeded in splitting the Resuttana mandamento from the Partanna-Mondello one, with Francesco Madonia in charge, significantly increasing his power base in the city. The Acquasanta family thus now answered to the Madonia clan, strong allies of the Galatolos.

Salvatore Riina started a new, brutal mafia war in 1981, when he killed many bosses that had belonged to the traditional power structure of Cosa Nostra, including Stefano Bontade, Salvatore Inzerillo, Rosario Riccobono and Salvatore Scaglione. Riina was backed by many of the allies he had spent the last decade gathering in the city, especially Francesco Madonia and Giuseppe Giacomo Gambino from San Lorenzo, but also, crucially, Michele Greco, leader of a different faction of the Greco clan hailing from Croceverde Giardini, which had fought its own war with the Ciaculli Grecos in the 1940s. During the Second Mafia War, the Galatolo family of Vincenzo and his brothers Giuseppe and Raffaele played a crucial role in many of the murders orchestrated by the Corleonesi. Vincenzo Galatolo was a member of the infamous "death squad" that terrorized Palermo during this time, a group which also included Giuseppe "Scarpuzzedda" Greco, Mario Prestifilippo, Filippo Marchese, Vincenzo Puccio, Salvatore Cucuzza, Giuseppe Lucchese, Raffaele Ganci, Giuseppe Giacomo Gambino and Nino Madonia. Like Galatolo, they were all fugitives with numerous warrants issued for their arrest. The death squad often operated from a rural house in fondo Pipitone, owned by Vincenzo Galatolo.

Of particular note was Vincenzo Galatolo's involvement in the murders of Domenico Bova and Francesco Gambino. They were two mafiosi who had backed Michele Cavataio during the 1950s wholesale market war, and he held them to be responsible for the murder of his uncle, Gaetano Tanu Alati Galatolo. While many of Cavataio's allies would be killed after 1969, eventually the Mafia declared a general amnesty for the survivors, and due to their advanced age, Riccobono had repeatedly turned down requests by Vincenzo Galatolo to kill the two to avenge his uncle. But after Riccobono himself was murdered by the Corleonesi in late 1982, Galatolo obtained permission from his new capomandamento and strong ally Francesco Madonia to kill them. Bova was shot dead shortly after Riccobono's murder, while Gambino disappeared through the lupara bianca.

Following the Maxi Trial and revelations by multiple pentiti, Vincenzo Galatolo was sentenced to life imprisonment for having participated in the murder of Carabinieri general Carlo Alberto Dalla Chiesa, as well as being responsible for the Pizzolungo bombing and the failed bomb attack against Giovanni Falcone 20 June 1989 in Addaura.

== Later years ==
Despite the arrests of several of its most important members, the Galatolo clan continued to play a fundamental role in the Acquasanta family and the entire Resuttana mandamento well into the 90s. Together with the Madonia clan, they had been the principal clans controlling the profitable extortion schemes on Palermo's businesses, and were even involved in a large scale drug trafficking operation involving relatives of the Galatolos living in the United States.

However, the clan would be shaken at its core in the 2010s. The daughter of Vincenzo Galatolo, Giovanna, broke with the family ranks and became a pentita, a woman testifying against the Mafia and in this case, against her father, uncles and brothers. She revealed how her father continued to run the criminal organization from behind bars despite being subjected to the stringent 41-bis prison regime. She also revealed the involvement of her family and the Madonia clan in the murders of secret service agents Antonino Agostino and Emanuele Piazza, two events still largely shrouded in mystery.

Another huge blow to the clan came when Giovanna's brother, Vito Galatolo, also became a pentito following his arrest in 2014. Despite his father's infamous reputation, Vito Galatolo was able to operate low profile and after running the family's interests for many years, was formally initiated in the Acquasanta family in 2010. After a brief stint in prison, he became the new leader of the Resuttana mandamento, the highest position of power within Cosa Nostra that the clan had held since the times of Tanu Alati. Vito Galatolo had moved to Venice where he worked as a boat technician, a position which allowed him to evade police attention whilst he coordinated the operations of his Mafia family back in Palermo. After he became a pentito, among many other things, he revealed Cosa Nostra's plans to kill Sicilian judge and Giovanni Falcone's successor, Nino Di Matteo. Galatolo's revelations proved instrumental in a series of new large trials against the Mafia in Palermo, including the trial "Apocalisse" that concluded in 2019, targeting the Resuttana mandamento.

== Sources ==
- (in Italian) Magistratura italiana (1992). Interrogatorio di Gaspare Mutolo, official government document
