= Circonvallazione massacre =

Sicilian Mafia kills five in 1982 attack on Palermo ring road

- The aftermath
- Location: Via Ugo La Malfa, Palermo, Italy
- Date: June 16, 1982; 10:00 am
- Target: Alfio Ferlito
- Attack type: Shooting
- Weapons: AK-47 Assault rifles and 12 gauge shotguns
- Deaths: 5
- Injuries: 1
- Perpetrators: Giuseppe Greco, Antonino Madonia, Giovanni Brusca, Calogero Ganci, Mario Prestifilippo, Giuseppe Lucchese, Francesco Paolo Anzelmo and Salvatore Cucuzza
- Motive: Elimination of opponents of the Corleonesi (Second Mafia War)

The Circonvallazione massacre, in Italian Strage della Circonvallazione, was a Cosa Nostra attack that took place on June 16, 1982 on the Palermo ring road. The attack was directed against Catanese boss Alfio Ferlito, who was being transferred from Enna to the Trapani jail, and died with the three escort carabinieri (Salvatore Raiti, Silvano Franzolin and Luigi Di Barca) and the 22-year-old Giuseppe Di Lavore, the driver of the private company tasked with the transportation of prisoners, who had replaced his father. The mandators of this massacre were Salvatore Riina and Bernardo Provenzano, in favor to Nitto Santapaola, who was in a year-long war with Ferlito for the dominance in the city of Catania territory.

== Attack ==
Around 10:00 am on June 16, 1982 a Mercedes w115 coming from Enna, driven by the civilian driver Giuseppe Di Lavore and with on board, the carabinieri Silvano Franzolin, Salvatore Raiti and Luigi Di Barca as well as the inmate Alfio Ferlito, was going in the Palermo ring road and was about to take the junction for the Palermo-Mazara del Vallo motorway, when it was reached by a BMW 520 and an Alfetta 2000 whose occupants opened fire with AK-47 automatic rifles and shotguns; the driver Di Lavore was killed instantly and, for this reason, the Mercedes swerved into the opposite lane and violently collided with a Fiat 500 that coming from the opposite direction, whose occupant, Nunzia Pecorella, was injured. Franzolin, sitting in the front seat (as Escort Chief), managed to get out of the car holding his pistol in an attempt to return fire but was instantly struck and killed. The killers then approached the Mercedes and riddled the remaining occupants and fled from the scene, in the massacre, the killers shot so many rounds, that the victims were almost unrecognizable.

The prefect Carlo Alberto Dalla Chiesa arrived at the site of the massacre. Dalla Chiesa, who had taken office about a month earlier, barely held back his tears in front of the massacred carabinieri.

== Investigations ==
The first investigations into the massacre started from the statements of a Syracuse-based convicted criminal, Armando Di Natale, who had appropriated half of the load of hashish destined for his "compare" Nunzio Salafia, a dangerous boss operating in the province of Syracuse, and, fearing then the latter's inevitable revenge, had decided to present himself at the offices of the Palermo Mobile Squad, where he had begun to make statements, and had led the men of Commissioner Giuseppe Montana to Salafia's hideout in Lentini; after a few days, Di Natale went unaccounted for, and on October 11, 1982, he was assassinated in an ambush near Alessandria while attempting to flee to France. Di Natale claimed that Syracusans Nunzio Salafia, Salvatore Genovese and Antonino Ragona had carried out the Circonvallazione massacre on the orders of Catanese boss Benedetto Santapaola and, for these reasons, investigating judge Giovanni Falcone issued arrest warrants against them for the crime of murder on October 7, 1982, which were followed the following year by those against other Syracuse defendants (Michele Marotta, Salvatore Di Stefano, Giuseppe Di Benedetto, and Gaetano Garro) following allegations by their cellmate Francesco Greco, who claimed to have known of their involvement in the massacre as members of the Salafia gang.

On November 8, 1985, the ordinance-sentence in the "Abbate Giovanni + 706" case (the so-called "Maxiprocesso di Palermo") remanded for trial for the Circonvallazione massacre the brothers Salvatore and Michele Greco, Salvatore Riina, Rosario Riccobono, Filippo Marchese, Pietro Vernengo, Bernardo Provenzano, Bernardo Brusca, Salvatore Scaglione, Antonino Geraci, Giuseppe Calò, Giovanni Scaduto, Ignazio Motisi, Andrea Di Carlo, Leonardo Greco and Benedetto Santapaola as principals (on the basis of the so-called "Buscetta theorem," according to which all "excellent crimes" are ordered by the Sicilian Mafia Commission), Giuseppe Greco (known as "Scarpuzzedda") and Mario Prestifilippo as material executors (since ballistic experts had shown that the AK-47 used in the massacre had already been used in other Mafia crimes); Nunzio Salafia, Antonino Ragona and Salvatore Genovese were acquitted in pre-trial proceedings for insufficient evidence while Carmelo Zanca, Tommaso Spadaro, Michele Marotta, Salvatore Di Stefano, Giuseppe Di Benedetto and Gaetano Garro were acquitted for "not having committed the act."

At the Maxi Trial, the widows and children of Carabinieri Raiti, Di Barca and Franzolin as well as those of driver Di Lavore also joined as civil parties. On December 16, 1987, the first-degree verdict of the Maxiprocesso was pronounced, sentencing Salvatore Riina, Bernardo Provenzano, Francesco Madonia, Michele Greco, Giuseppe Greco and Benedetto Santapaola to life imprisonment for the Circonvallazione massacre, while Mario Prestifilippo was declared no longer prosecutable because he had been killed a few months earlier; on the other hand, Rosario Riccobono, Bernardo Brusca, Salvatore Scaglione, Giuseppe Calò and Antonino Geraci were acquitted by insufficient evidence, and Salvatore Greco, Filippo Marchese, Pietro Vernengo, Giovanni Scaduto, Ignazio Motisi and Andrea Di Carlo were acquitted by full verdict.

The Maxi Trial appeal trial opened on February 22, 1989, and concluded on December 10 of the following year: the Court of Appeals, presided over by Vincenzo Palmegiano, completely overturned the first-degree verdict and upheld only Santapaola's conviction while acquitting the other defendants, on the grounds that the massacre was not attributable to the members of the "Commission" but was allegedly the work of individual Mafia groups (in particular the clan of Rosario Riccobono which controlled the territory in which the massacre took place and was allied with the Santapaola in the heroin trade) who, having unlimited decision-making autonomy in matters relating to drug trafficking, wanted to avenge a "snub" made by Alfio Ferlito in a drug deal.

On January 30, 1992, the First Criminal Chamber of the Supreme Court, headed by Arnaldo Valente, annulled the appeal acquittals because it found the reasons given illogical and ordered a new trial for the defendants. The retrial was held between 1993 and 1995 before the Court of Appeals presided over by Rosario Gino: on March 18, 1995, Salvatore Riina, Bernardo Provenzano, Michele Greco, Francesco Madonia, Giuseppe Calò, Bernardo Brusca and Antonino Geraci were sentenced as principals to life imprisonment.

In 1996, statements by collaborators Calogero Ganci, Francesco Paolo Anzelmo, Giovanni Brusca and Salvatore Cucuzza, who self-accused themselves of carrying out the massacre, prompted investigators to reopen the investigation: in 2003, in addition to Ganci, Anzelmo, Brusca and Cucuzza, Raffaele Ganci (Calogero's father), Antonino Madonia and Giuseppe Lucchese were remanded for trial, while Michelangelo La Barbera, Mariano Tullio Troia and Salvatore Montalto chose the abbreviated trial; Giuseppe Greco "Scarpuzzedda" could not be tried as he had been declared dead for several years.

During the trial, defendant Antonino Madonia called the president of the court Salvatore Di Vitale and prosecutor Domenico Gozzo (already reached by a threatening letter from Madonia) "scoundrels" and tried to recuse himself from the court, without success. However, on February 2, 2005, the gup Fabio Licata sentenced La Barbera, Tullio Troia and Montalto to life imprisonment, while on October 14 of the same year the Palermo Court of Assizes, presided over by Salvatore Di Vitale, pronounced life imprisonment for Raffaele Ganci, Antonino Madonia and Giuseppe Lucchese and declared the crime prescribed for Calogero Ganci, Francesco Paolo Anzelmo, Giovanni Brusca and Salvatore Cucuzza. In 2006 the sentence was upheld on appeal.
