= List of Sicilian Mafia clans =

Clans in the Sicilian Mafia are united under a Mandamento, led by a Capo madamento, that represents the clans' bosses to the Cupola. In Sicily, there are 94 Mafia families subject to 29 mandamenti.

== Province of Agrigento ==
- Cuntrera-Caruana Mafia clan

(10 mandamenti):

- Ribera
- Santa Elisabetta
- Agrigento
- Porto Empedocle
- Canicattì
- Cianciana
- Sambuca di Sicilia
- Casteltermini
- Palma di Montechiaro
- Campobello di Licata

== Province of Caltanissetta ==
- Rinzivillo Mafia clan

(4 mandamenti):

- Gela
- Vallelunga
- Riesi
- Mussomeli

== Province of Catania ==
(none mandamenti)

- Catania
- Ramacca
- Caltagirone

== Province of Enna ==
(none mandamenti)

- Barrafranca
- Calascibetta
- Enna
- Pietraperzia
- Villarosa

== Palermo ==
- Galatolo Mafia clan
- Graviano Mafia clan
- Greco Mafia clan
- Inzerillo Mafia clan
- Motisi Mafia clan

(8 mandamenti):

- Porta Nuova
- Brancaccio
- Boccadifalco
- Passo di Rigano
- Santa Maria di Gesù
- Noce
- Pagliarelli
- Resuttana
- San Lorenzo

== Province of Palermo ==
(7 mandamenti):

- Camporeale
- Corleone
- Cinisi
- Bagheria
- Trabia
- Belmonte Mezzagno
- delle Madonie

== Province of Trapani ==
- Minore Mafia clan

(4 mandamenti):

- Mazara del Vallo
- Trapani
- Alcamo
- Castelvetrano

== Other ==
- Mistretta
- Capo D'Orlando
- Sud Siracusa
