= Mariano Tullio Troia =

Member of the Sicilian Mafia

Mariano Tullio Troia (Italian pronunciation: [maˈrjaːno ˈtulljo ˈtrɔːja]; Palermo, 3 September 1933 – Viterbo, 27 March 2010) was a member of the Sicilian Mafia. He was on the "most wanted list" of the Italian ministry of the Interior from 1992 until his arrest in Palermo in September 1998.

== High ranking Mafia boss ==
Mariano Tullio Troia was the son of Mariano Troia, the powerful Mafia boss that controlled the San Lorenzo neighbourhood of Palermo. Mariano Troia had been, alongside his allies Antonino Matranga of Resuttana, Vincenzo Nicoletti of Pallavicino, Pietro Torretta of Uditore and Michele Cavataio from Acquasanta, one of the instigators of the First Mafia War which broke out in Palermo in the early 1960s. Troia fled to Milan in the subsequent police crackdown, where he later died of natural causes in 1967, shortly after turning himself in.

Despite his father's involvement with that group, most of whom were killed off in subsequent reprisals by the Mafia, Mariano Tullio Troia was allowed to rise up the ranks in Cosa Nostra. For a long time Troia remained unknown to police investigators although he had reached a major role within the organization as head of the mandamento of the neighbourhood of San Lorenzo. He was one of the most trusted lieutenants of the so-called boss of bosses Totò Riina. In the early 1990s his name emerged in statements of some collaborators of justice (pentiti), such as Gaspare Mutolo and Giuseppe Marchese. He substituted Giuseppe Giacomo Gambino who was jailed in 1986 as head of the San Lorenzo mandamento and on the Sicilian Mafia Commission.

Police received detailed information from Alberto Lo Cicero, former driver and confidant of Troia. Lo Cicero said that some Commission members of Cosa Nostra, including Riina, met in Troia’s villa in San Lorenzo. Lo Cicero became a pentito in August 1992 after surviving an ambush on 20 December 1991, and the killing of Antimafia judges Giovanni Falcone and Paolo Borsellino in May and July 1992.

== Fugitive and arrest ==
In October 1992, he was indicted for the murder of Christian Democrat politician Salvo Lima, the right hand man of Prime Minister Giulio Andreotti. His name also appeared as backer of the killing of Mario Prestifilippo and Giovanni Fici, assassinated in 1987 and 1988 to prevent retaliation after the elimination of the Mafia killer Pino "Little Shoe" Greco.

He was put on Italy’s most wanted list. Italian police claimed Troia had moved to South Africa where he was being harboured by Salvatore Morettino, a naturalised South African citizen living in Houghton (a wealthy suburb of Johannesburg), according to Western Cape police intelligence in a March 1998 briefing. He was also in contact with Vito Roberto Palazzolo, a Sicilian businessman with ties to the Mafia.

He was arrested in Palermo on 15 September 1998. At the time, he was considered to be the number 3 of the Sicilian Mafia. He was captured on the second floor of a house in the Tommaso Natale neighbourhood in bed with the lady of the house while the woman's husband was asleep in downstairs in a room with her daughters.

== Death ==
Troia died on 27 March 2010, in the prison hospital of Viterbo. He participated in or, as member of the Commission, was held responsible for some 40 murders.
