= Salvatore Scaglione =

Mafia boss (1940–1982)

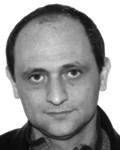
- Born: 6 April 1940; Palermo, Sicily, Italy
- Died: 30 November 1982 (aged 42); San Giuseppe Jato, Sicily, Italy
- Other names: "U Pugilista" (The Boxer); Totò il pugile
- Known for: Mafia boss and drug trafficker
- Allegiance: Noce Mafia family / Sicilian Mafia

Salvatore Scaglione (10 April 1940 in Palermo – 30 November 1982 in San Giuseppe Jato) was a member of the Sicilian Mafia. He was the boss of the Noce, a neighborhood in central Palermo, since the early 1970s. In 1974, he became a member of the reconstructed Sicilian Mafia Commission. His nickname was "U Pugilista", referring to the fact he was involved in professional boxing in his youth. Together with Stefano Bontade, Salvatore Inzerillo and Rosario Riccobono, he was considered one of the main rivals of the Corleonesi of Salvatore Riina during the Second Mafia War in Palermo. He was killed by the Corleonesi on 30 November 1982.

== Boss of the Noce ==
Scaglione became boss of the Noce mandamento in the early 1970s, at a time when the Mafia was recuperating from the disastrous end of the First Mafia War and subsequent police crackdown, with the Noce family in particular having been one of the hardest hit by the war. Scaglione was close from the beginning to other powerful mafiosi from Palermo such as Stefano Bontade, Salvatore Inzerillo and Rosario Riccobono, and future pentito Antonino Calderone recalled that, due to this, Mafia boss Michele Cavataio had been plotting to murder Scaglione, a plot which was called off at the last minute due to the intervention of the boss of Riesi Giuseppe Di Cristina but which also precipitated Cavataio's own murder on 10 December 1969, in the Viale Lazio massacre.

During the 1970s Scaglione worked particularly close with Salvatore Inzerillo and Rosario Riccobono in the cigarette smuggling operations that the Sicilian Mafia ran in Campania through the Nuvoletta brothers and Michele Zaza, themselves initiated as "men of honour" in the organization. Soon enough, through the same contraband routes, these activities quickly evolved into extremely profitable heroin trafficking, which immensely enriched the Mafia families of Palermo within a few years. Scaglione was furthermore involved in the booming construction industry in Palermo at the time, which was largely in the hands of the Mafia. This allowed Scaglione to become the de-facto owner of dozens of different buildings and apartments between the areas of San Lorenzo and the city's western outskirts. As capo mandamento of the Noce, Scaglione became a member the Commission, the coordinating body of Cosa Nostra in Sicily, in 1974.

== Clash with the Corleonesi ==
In the mid 1970s, the growing power of the Corleonesi led by Salvatore Riina and Bernardo Provenzano began concerning some of the established Mafia families in Palermo and other provinces. According to pentito Gaspare Mutolo, between 1974 and 1976, several meetings were held in properties owned by Gaetano Badalamenti, Rosario Di Maggio (uncle of Salvatore Inzerillo) and Stefano Bontade, and, later, at the Favarella estate owned by Michele Greco, where many bosses would gather to discuss the growing threat. Among them, Scaglione, Inzerillo, Riccobono and especially Giuseppe Di Cristina from Riesi held a tough stance and even favored an armed confrontation, whereas Bontade, Badalamenti and Di Maggio held a more moderate position, asserting that Riina would never have been able to unseat their power and influence and it was thus unnecessary to wage war on the Corleonesi. As these meetings eventually moved over to the Favarella estate, Michele Greco, who was secretly allied with Riina, was able to inform the Corleonesi boss of the intentions of Scaglione, Inzerillo and Riccobono towards him.

In 1977, the struggle became more severe as the Corleonesi had secured enough allies to obtain a dominant position during Commission meetings. Riina tried to unseat Riccobono and Scaglione from their positions, and while Riccobono only lost the Resuttana family, which became its own mandamento, Scaglione fared worse. Riina used as a pretext the fact that Scaglione's daughter, then 16 years old, had been impregnated by the 19-year-old son of one of the builders working for Scaglione, Luigi Meola. Rather than punishing his daughter and killing Meola's son, Scaglione had agreed to a "rehabilitating marriage", thus, according to Riina, compromising his family's honor. This was, of course, all a pretext to reduce Scaglione's power, but it had the effect that in 1977 Scaglione lost his position as capo mandamento and the Noce mandamento itself ceased to exist, and became subordinate to that of Porta Nuova run by Giuseppe Calò, a close ally of Riina.

While Scaglione was able to remain the boss of the family, his position was made even more precarious by the fact that the Noce family had become infiltrated by men close to Riina, particularly Raffaele Ganci and his sons. As related by future pentito Francesco Paolo Anselmo, when he was initiated into the family, Riina had told him that he was against the initiation because he deemed Scaglione to be "the worst boss in Palermo". Soon, Scaglione was almost completely isolated and became in effect a "general without an army", as most of the up-and-rising members of the Noce family were allied with Riina and the Corleonesi.

== Second Mafia War and death ==
The Second Mafia War began when the Corleonesi murdered Scaglione's former allies, Stefano Bontade and Salvatore Inzerillo, on 23 April and 11 May 1981 respectively. Scaglione initially tried to maintain a neutral position but after the murder of Inzerillo, in a similar move as Rosario Riccobono, he decided to openly side with the Corleonesi, and to prove his loyalty to them he personally took part in the strangling of Santo Inzerillo and Calogero Di Maggio, the brother and uncle of Salvatore Inzerillo, on 27 May of that same year. Two days later, he would personally lead two members of the Noce family who had been close to Bontade and Inzerillo into a trap, and their bodies were never found. Many more members of the Noce family tied to the established Palermo Mafia would be killed during the war.

Salvatore Scaglione and Rosario Riccobono were thus spared in the initial phase of the Mafia war and both bosses proved to be invaluable allies to the Corleonesi, luring many of their former friends to their deaths. However, having betrayed their former friends made both of them untrustworthy in the eyes of the new Mafia leadership, and Riina had not forgotten how only less than a decade before, both bosses had openly called for Riina's elimination. Thus, once they had outlived their usefulness, Riina decided to have both of them eliminated.

On the morning of 30 November 1982, Scaglione and Riccobono were summoned to a meeting in a country villa owned by the Brusca family of San Giuseppe Jato for a meeting between capimandamento. In order to reassure Scaglione of his safety, Raffaele Ganci and his sons set up a series of appointments to him in Palermo for the afternoon, but Scaglione would never have returned alive from that meeting. After arriving at the villa, where only two hours before, unbeknownst to Scaglione, Rosario Riccobono and three of his men had been strangled, he was led into the same room where Rosario Riccobono was killed and waiting for him there were Salvatore Riina and several men of the Brusca family. One of them, Giuseppe Maniscalco, later became a pentito and revealed that upon understanding he was about to be murdered, Scaglione pleaded for his life and claimed to be innocent, but Riina taunted him by saying, "if I do not kill you and Riccobono, then my name is no longer Salvatore Riina", showcasing just how deep Riina's resentment for his two enemies had been. Scaglione was subsequently strangled and like the other four before him, his body was dissolved in a vat of acid just outside the villa. At the subsequent meeting, Raffaele Ganci was made the new boss of the Noce family, and the mandamento abolished in 1977 was restored with him as the head, as indeed, the Noce mandamento under Ganci, the Resuttana mandamento under Francesco Madonia and the San Lorenzo mandamento under Giuseppe Giacomo Gambino became the strongest in all of Palermo, as they were led by Riina's most trusted lieutenants in the city.

Scaglione was sentenced to 23 years in prison at the Maxi Trial in 1987 even though he was dead by then. Rumours of his death emerged in the mid-1980s but were not confirmed until the end of that decade through the informant Francesco Marino Mannoia. His body has never been found.

== Sources ==
- (in Italian) Magistratura italiana e francese (1987). Interrogatorio di Antonino Calderone, official government link
- (in Italian) Magistratura italiana (1992). Interrogatorio di Gaspare Mutolo, official government document
