= Francesco Di Carlo =

Italian mobster (1941–2020)

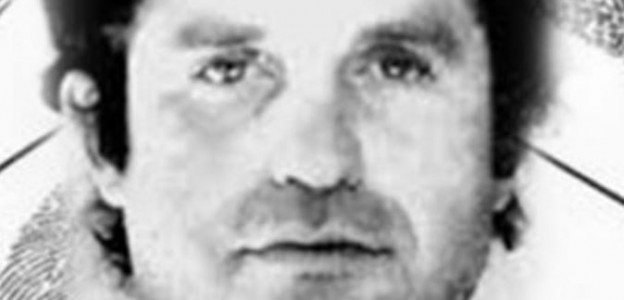
- before 1990
- Born: 18 February 1941; Altofonte, Sicily, Italy
- Died: 16 April 2020 (aged 79); Paris, France
- Occupations: Drug trafficker, mobster
- Organization: Sicilian Mafia
- Known for: Suspected of killing Roberto Calvi

Francesco Di Carlo (18 February 1941 – 16 April 2020) was a member of the Sicilian Mafia who turned state witness (pentito — a mafioso turned informer) in 1996. He was accused of being the killer of Roberto Calvi, nicknamed "God's banker", because he was in charge of Banco Ambrosiano and his close association with the Vatican Bank. He died after contracting COVID-19 during the pandemic on 16 April 2020.

== Early career ==
Di Carlo was born in Altofonte, where he was initiated into the Mafia family in 1966 by the boss at the time, Salvatore La Barbera (not to be confused with the Palermo Centro boss who was killed in 1963). He became capo famiglia in the mid-1970s. Altofonte was part of the mandamento of San Giuseppe Jato, headed by Antonio Salamone and Bernardo Brusca. According to the pentito Giuseppe Marchese, Di Carlo was an influential mafioso and a very competent drug trafficker connected with the Corleonesi.

Di Carlo was described as an elegant and intelligent mafioso who received an education at the prestigious Jesuit college of Gonzaga in Palermo where he met the prince Alessandro Vanni Calvello, who would be best man at his marriage. Di Carlo and Vanni Calvello were partners in the nightclub "Il Castello" in San Nicola Arena, just outside Palermo on the highway to Messina. The club was popular with the beau monde of Palermo, and hosted concerts by such visiting stars as Ray Charles and Amanda Lear. However, during the daylight hours, the Mafia used it as a meeting place.

== Expulsion from Cosa Nostra ==
Di Carlo was expelled (posato) from Cosa Nostra, because of a conflict about a lost shipment of heroin or an unpaid consignment of hashish. Because of his useful contributions for the Mafia, he was not killed but had to leave Italy. He moved to London. His brother Andrea Di Carlo took over the command of the Mafia family and became a member of the Sicilian Mafia Commission. Because he had been expelled, he was approached by then-fugitive Salvatore Contorno once he arrived in Rome, who trusted that Di Carlo was not kept up to date with the Corleonesi's plans to kill him, and as a result, Di Carlo provided money and support to Contorno during his stay in Rome before his arrest and eventual collaboration with the authorities.

According to Di Carlo, he was expelled in 1982 because he refused to betray some members of the Cuntrera-Caruana Mafia clan (Pasquale Cuntrera and Alfonso Caruana), during the Mafia war in the province of Agrigento that ran parallel to the Second Mafia War in Palermo. Mafia boss Carmelo Colletti, connected with the Corleonesi, had taken over the command after killing Giuseppe Settecasi and his lieutenant Leonardo Caruana. He wanted the other Cuntreras and Caruanas out of the way as well. However, it was Colletti who was killed in 1983.

== Drug trafficking ==
In the United Kingdom, Di Carlo was involved in hashish and heroin trafficking. He bought a mansion in Woking, Surrey, in the stockbrokers-belt near London. In the United Kingdom, he teamed up with Alfonso Caruana. Di Carlo created an infrastructure to facilitate the smuggling operations: he owned a hotel, travel agencies and import-export companies.

In June 1985 The British HM Customs and Excise and the Royal Canadian Mounted Police (RCMP) seized 60 kilograms of heroin in a controlled delivery. In the United Kingdom, Di Carlo was arrested with three others. In March 1987 Di Carlo was convicted and sentenced to a 25-year prison term for heroin trafficking.

== Pentito ==
In June 1996 Di Carlo decided to collaborate with the Italian authorities. He was transferred from his United Kingdom prison to Rome. He was hailed as the "new Buscetta". Di Carlo mentioned several politicians to be members of Cosa Nostra, among others: the Christian Democrat politician Bernardo Mattarella, the former president of Sicily Giovanni Provenzano, and Giovanni Musotto, father of Francesco Musotto, former president of the Province of Palermo who has been accused of Mafia association.

He also testified about the murder of journalist Mauro De Mauro. The investigative reporter had been kidnapped and killed by the Mafia in 1970. Di Carlo testified in 2001 that De Mauro was killed because he had learned that one of his former fascist friends, Prince Junio Valerio Borghese, was planning a coup d'état (the so-called Golpe Borghese) with like-minded army officers determined to stop what they considered as Italy's drift to the left. Di Carlo became an important witness in numerous anti-mafia trials and also testified in the trials against former Prime Minister Giulio Andreotti and Silvio Berlusconi’s right-hand man Marcello Dell'Utri.

He wished to move to Canada as part of an international agreement which allowed him to be relocated almost anywhere in the world. In an exclusive interview with W-FIVE, Di Carlo confirmed the allegation that the Sicilian Mafia considers Canada to be the best place in the world to conduct their criminal businesses. In November 2000, Di Carlo spoke to W-FIVE in hopes of sending a message to Alfonso Caruana. During his interview, he revealed that the high council of the Mafia had ordered Di Carlo to murder Caruana, who had fallen out of favour. Di Carlo refused, saving Alfonso's life, but putting his own in danger. Di Carlo wanted the Caruanas to remember this life-saving favour.

== Involvement in Roberto Calvi murder ==
In July 1991 the pentito Francesco Marino Mannoia claimed that Di Carlo had killed Roberto Calvi, nicknamed "God's banker", because he was in charge of Banco Ambrosiano, in which the Vatican Bank was the main shareholder. Calvi had been killed because he had lost Mafia funds when Banco Ambrosiano collapsed. The order to kill Calvi had come from Mafia boss Giuseppe Calò.

When Di Carlo became a state witness in June 1996, he denied that he was the killer, but admitted that he had been approached by Calò to do the job. However, Di Carlo could not be reached in time, and when he later called Calò, the latter said that everything had been taken care of already. According to Di Carlo, the killers were Vincenzo Casillo and Sergio Vaccari, who belonged to the Camorra from Naples and have since been killed.
