= Giuseppe Giacomo Gambino =

Member of the Sicilian Mafia

Giuseppe Giacomo Gambino (Palermo, 21 May 1941 – Milan, 30 November 1996), also known as u tignusu (the bald one), was a member of the Mafia and head of the San Lorenzo mandamento. Giuseppe Giacomo Gambino was considered the deputy of Totò Riina since the 1970s and the two frequently traveled together.

During the Second Mafia War in the beginning of the 1980s he was part of a "death squad" of the Corleonesi together with Mario Prestifilippo, Filippo Marchese, Vincenzo Puccio, Giovan Battista Pullarà, Giuseppe Lucchese, Pino Greco and Nino Madonia.

Riina's group killed Rosario Riccobono in November 1982 by strangling him, Gambino sat on the Sicilian Mafia Commission as mandamento San Lorenzo leader. At that time, the mandamento of San Lorenzo under Gambino, that of Resuttana under Francesco Madonia and that of the Noce under Raffaele Ganci became the strongest in Palermo due to being Totò Riina's collaborators.

Gambino was involved in the killing of Antimafia magistrates Giovanni Falcone and Paolo Borsellino, as well as the politician Salvo Lima in 1992, and businessman Libero Grassi who opposed extortion by the Mafia.

He was arrested and committed suicide in the San Vittore prison in Milan on 30 November 1996.
