= Leonardo Messina =

Member of the Sicilian Mafia

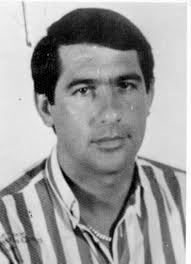
Leo Messina

Leonardo "Narduzzo" Messina (born San Cataldo, September 22, 1955) is a Sicilian former mafioso who became a government informant or "pentito" in 1992. His testimony led to the arrest of over 200 mafiosi during the so-called "Operation Leopard" (Italian: Operazione Leopardo). Messina has implicated several politicians and government officials with ties to Sicilian Mafia, in particular Giulio Andreotti, seven times Prime Minister for Italy.

== Early career ==
Born in San Cataldo, Caltanissetta, Messina was from a family of mafiosi going back a few generations. "I represent the seventh generation belonging to Cosa Nostra," he said. "I was affiliated not because I was a robber or because I was able to kill, but because I was bound to become a member by family tradition."

He left elementary school and became involved in burglary. He was imprisoned several times. In April 1982 after serving four years for armed robbery he eventually became a "man of honour" in the local Mafia family of San Cataldo. Messina became a close friend of Giuseppe Madonia, the boss of Vallelunga – one of the most important Mafia families in the province of Caltanissetta and an ally of the Corleonesi.

In 1984 he was arrested again for the killing of a drug dealer. He stayed in prison until 1989. After his release, he organized a drug trafficking ring for Giuseppe Madonia that covered several region in Italy. Madonia, in the meantime, had become the representative of the province of Caltanissetta in the Interprovincional Commission of Cosa Nostra.

== Arrest and pentimento ==
Messina was arrested in April 1992 and decided to become a government informant (pentito). He was the first mafioso to start collaborating after the Capaci massacre in which judge Giovanni Falcone, his wife and three men of his police escort were killed. He said he was moved by emotional appeal of Rosaria Schifani – the widow of one of the police escorts of Falcone – against the Mafia.

Messina started to collaborate on June 30, 1992 and was a goldmine of information to Falcone’s colleague Paolo Borsellino, especially about the workings of the Mafia in central and southern Sicily. He talked about a rival mafia-like organisation in Sicily, the Stidda. It was composed originally of mafiosi who had left the organisation during the Second Mafia War of the 1981-82. The new group was particularly strong in southern Sicily around the towns of Agrigento, Caltanissetta and Gela. As a result of his declarations 203 arrest warrants were issued on November 17, 1992, in the so-called "Operation Leopard" (Operazione Leopardo). At that time the Mafia had killed Borsellino as well.

== The Corleonesi reign of terror ==
Messina also revealed that Cosa Nostra was in the midst of a profound internal crisis around 1990. Life within the organisation had become an intolerable nightmare under the reign of terror instituted by the Corleonesi under the leadership of Totò Riina. Murder had become institutionalised instead of a measure that had to be used sparingly and rationally.

Messina described how the Corleonesi organized their rise to power: "They took power by slowly, slowly killing everyone … We were kind of infatuated with them because we thought that getting rid of the old bosses we would become the new bosses. Some people killed their brother, others their cousin and so on, because they thought they would take their places. Instead, slowly, (the Corleonesi) gained control of the whole system. (…) First they used us to get rid of the old bosses, then they got rid of all those who raised their heads, like Giuseppe Greco 'the Shoe', Mario Prestifilippo and Vincenzo Puccio … all that’s left are men without character, who are their puppets."

== Public-sector contracts ==
An important part of Messina’s testimony was information on how the Mafia maintained its grip on construction and public-sector contracts in Sicily, which some experts suggest is the Sicilian Mafia’s greatest source of income. He revealed the identity of Totò Riina's "minister of public works" Angelo Siino – a businessman who oversaw the Mafia’s public-sector contracts, collected the bribes, met the entrepreneurs and politicians, made the threats and, if necessary, ordered the killings.

Messina himself was heavily involved negotiating the contracts as the underboss of the Mafia family with an aging leader, acting as the intermediary between business leaders and politicians. Government contracts were an important source of revenue and virtually nothing got built without Mafia approval and the necessary kickbacks. "The rule is that any firm starting a job on the territory of a family must contact a man of honour of that family, in order to establish … the percentage to be paid to the Mafia family, considering the overall value of the work," according to Messina. Masonic lodges played an important role to tie the necessary contacts. All the most senior Mafia bosses were affiliated to the Masonry, according to Messina, which represented a “meeting point for everyone”.

== Mafia and politics ==
Perhaps Messina's most devastating revelations were about the relations between Cosa Nostra and Italian politics. He was the first pentito to name Giulio Andreotti as the ultimate point of reference of a chain of political exchanges that should have adjusted the sentence of the Maxi Trial that had established Cosa Nostra a single hierarchical organisation ruled by a Commission and that its leaders could be held responsible for criminal acts that were committed to benefit the organisation (the so-called Buscetta theorem). The Mafia counted on judge Corrado Carnevale of the Supreme Court to modify the sentence. And Salvo Lima – Andreotti’s pro-consul on Sicily – "acted as the liaison with (…) Andreotti for the needs of the Sicilian Mafia," said Messina.

However, one of the architects of the Maxi Trial, judge Giovanni Falcone, had moved to the ministry of Justice in Rome and managed to prevent that Carnevale would preside the section that would judge the Maxi Trial sentence. According to Messina, there was widespread resentment within Cosa Nostra toward the Andreotti faction of the Christian Democracy and the Craxi group of the Italian Socialist Party.

== The Mafia betrayed ==
The Mafia felt betrayed by Salvo Lima and Andreotti. In their opinion they had failed to block the confirmation of the sentence of the Maxi Trial by the Italian Supreme Court in January 1992, which upheld the Buscetta theorem. Many Mafia bosses were condemned to life in prison and Cosa Nostra reacted furiously. In March 1992, they killed Lima and in May Mafia killers blew up Giovanni Falcone, his wife, and three bodyguards. In July, a second car bomb killed Falcone's colleague and close friend Paolo Borsellino, along with five bodyguards.

"As for the killings of Falcone and Borsellino, without a doubt the result of the Maxi Trial played a determining role, " Messina said. "A reaction was absolutely necessary to improve morale and to re-assert the power of Cosa Nostra. That reaction had to be against the magistrates who had handled the case and against the politicians who had failed to guarantee the positive outcome of the trial and had allowed Carnevale to be removed from the case."

== Legacy ==
Although a mafioso of minor importance from the province of Caltanissetta, Messina’s early testimony about the links between Cosa Nostra and politics was of crucial importance at the time. The knowledge about the inner workings of the top echelon of Cosa Nostra, he obtained from Giuseppe Madonia – considered to be the number two of the Mafia around 1990. He was a key witness for the prosecution against the Mafia in the province of Caltanissetta. On December 4, 1992 he appeared before the Italian Parliamentary Antimafia Commission led by senator Luciano Violante.

However, some of his declarations were far fetched. He claimed that there was Mafia Commission on a global scale, which has been discarded by most serious academics and law enforcement specialists. He also claimed Umberto Bossi and the League of the North, a political organization advocating the separation of Northern and Southern Italy, was a "creature" of the Sicilian mafia in order to set up a similar League of the South controlled by the Mafia.
