= Sicilian Mafia Commission =

Body of leading Sicilian Mafia members

The Sicilian Mafia Commission (Italian: Commissione provinciale), usually simply known as Commissione or Cupola, is a body of leading Sicilian Mafia members who decide on important questions concerning the actions of, and settling disputes within the Sicilian Mafia or Cosa Nostra. It is composed of representatives of a mandamento (a district of three geographically contiguous Mafia families) who are called capo mandamento or rappresentante. The Commission is not a central government of the Mafia, but a representative mechanism for consultation of independent Mafia families who decide by consensus. Its primary role is to keep the use of violence among families within limits tolerable to the public and political authorities.

== Characteristics ==
Judge Cesare Terranova disclosed the existence of the commission

The Commission is not the supreme command of the Sicilian Mafia. "Contrary to the wide-spread image presented by the media, these superordinate bodies of coordination cannot be compared with the executive boards of major legal firms. Their power is intentionally limited [and] it would be entirely wrong to see in the Cosa Nostra a centrally managed, internationally active Mafia holding company," according to criminologist Letizia Paoli.

The jurisdiction extends over a province; each province of Sicily has some kind of a Commission, except Messina, Siracusa and Ragusa. Initially the idea was that the family bosses would not sit on the Commission, but in order to prevent imbalances of power some other prominent member would be appointed instead. However, that rule was not obeyed from the start. According to the pentito Tommaso Buscetta, the Commission first came into being "to settle disputes between members of the various families and their bosses" in order to discipline members of each family. Only later did its function expand to "the regulation of the activities of all families in a province."

== Exposure ==
The first time the existence of such a Commission filtered out to the rest of the world was in 1965 during the inquiry into the First Mafia War by judge Cesare Terranova. Terranova based himself on a confidential report of the Carabinieri of May 28, 1963, where a confidential informant revealed the existence of a commission composed of fifteen persons – six from Palermo city and the rest from towns in the province – "each with the rank of boss of either a group or a Mafia family." Judge Terranova did not believe that the existence of a commission meant that the Mafia was a tightly unified structure. In 1973, Leonardo Vitale – a lower-level Mafioso – revealed the existence of the Commission, but his revelations were discarded at the time and Vitale judged insane.

The existence of the Commission was first established by a court of law during the Maxi Trial in 1986–87. The groundwork for the Maxi Trial was done at the preliminary investigative phase by Palermo's Antimafia Pool, created by judge Rocco Chinnici in which the judges Giovanni Falcone and Paolo Borsellino worked as well. It was Tommaso Buscetta who definitively revealed the existence and workings of the Commission, when he became a state witness and started to give evidence to judge Giovanni Falcone in 1984. It enabled Falcone to argue that Cosa Nostra was a unified hierarchical structure ruled by a Commission and that its leaders – who normally would not dirty their hands with criminal acts – could be held responsible for criminal activities that were committed to benefit the organisation.

The existence and functioning of the Commission was confirmed by the first degree conviction. The Mafia was identified with the Cosa Nostra organization, and defined a unique, pyramidal and apex type organization, provincially directed by a Commission or Cupola and regionally by an interprovincial organism, in which the head of the Palermo Commission has a hegemonic role. This premise became known as the Buscetta theorem. That vision of Cosa Nostra was not immediately recognized. Other magistrates, in particular Corrado Carnevale – also known as the Sentence Killer – of the Supreme Court (Corte di Cassazione), sustained that Mafia associations are autonomous groups, not connected amongst themselves, and therefore, the collective responsibility for the Commission members did not exist. Carnevale's view prevailed at the appeal of the Maxi Trial, but at the theorem was confirmed upheld by the final sentence of the Supreme Court in January 1992. (Carnevale did not preside the court that did the ruling.) In the meantime, the Antimafia Pool of Palermo was dismantled and judge Rocco Chinnici had been murdered in 1983.

Many Mafia bosses were condemned to life in prison and Cosa Nostra reacted furiously and started a series of revenge killings because of the Supreme Court sentence. The Mafia had counted on the politicians Salvo Lima and Prime Minister Giulio Andreotti to appoint Corrado Carnevale to review the sentence. Carnevale had overturned many Mafia convictions on the slenderest of technicalities previously. Carnevale, however, had to withdraw due to pressure from the public and from Giovanni Falcone – who at the time had moved to the Ministry of Justice. Falcone was backed by the Minister of Justice Claudio Martelli despite the fact that he served under Prime Minister Andreotti. In March 1992, Lima was killed, followed by Falcone and Paolo Borsellino later that year.

=== Interprovincional Commission ===
Beyond the provincial level, details are vague. According to the pentito Tommaso Buscetta, an Interprovincial Commission was created in the 1970s, while the pentito Antonino Calderone claims that there had been a rappresentante regionale in the 1950s even before the Commissions and the capi mandamento were created. The rappresentante regionale in those days was a certain Andrea Fazio from Trapani.

The Interprovincional or Regional Commission was probably set up in February 1975 on the instigation of Giuseppe Calderone from Catania who became its first "secretary". The other members were Gaetano Badalamenti for Palermo, Giuseppe Settecasi (Agrigento), Cola Buccellato (Trapani), Angelo Mongiovì (Enna) and Giuseppe Di Cristina (Caltanissetta).

According to the pentito Leonardo Messina, the Regional Commission in 1992 was made up by Salvatore Riina for the province of Palermo, Nitto Santapaola for the province of Catania, Salvatore Saitta for the province of Enna, Giuseppe "Piddu" Madonia for the province of Caltanissetta, Antonio Ferro for the province of Agrigento and Mariano Agate for the province of Trapani.

== History and rules ==
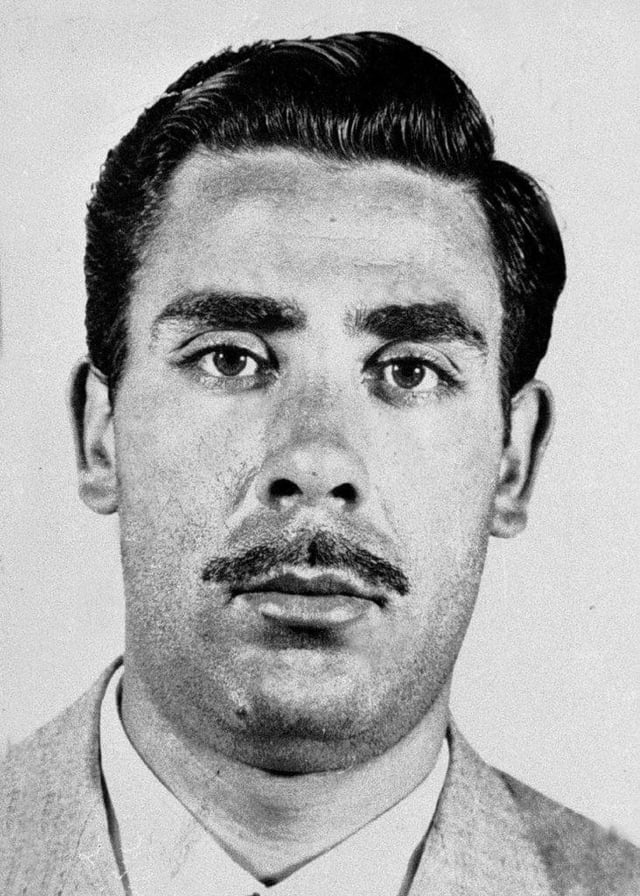
Tommaso Buscetta in his early years

According to Tommaso Buscetta, the first Sicilian Mafia Commission for the province of Palermo was formed after a series of meetings between top American and Sicilian mafiosi that took place in Palermo between October 12–16, 1957, in the hotel Delle Palme and the Spanò seafood restaurant. US gangsters Joseph Bonanno and Lucky Luciano suggested their Sicilian counterparts to form a Commission, following the example of the American Mafia that had formed their Commission in the 1930s, in an effort to reduce infighting within the organization. The meeting came at the tail end of a violent Mafia war in Palermo over the fruit and vegetable wholesale market that was moved from the Zisa area to Acquasanta near the port in January 1955, disturbing the delicate power balances within Cosa Nostra.

The Sicilians agreed with their suggestion and Buscetta, Gaetano Badalamenti and Salvatore Greco set the ground rules. Sometime in early 1958, the Sicilian Mafia formed its first Mafia Commission. It was formed among Mafia families in the province of Palermo, which had the highest concentration of cosche (Mafia families), approximately 46. Salvatore "Ciaschiteddu" Greco was appointed as its first segretario (secretary) or rappresentante regionale, essentially a primus inter pares – the first among equals. Initially, the secretary had very little power. His task was simply to organize the meetings.

Before that time, the Mafia families were not connected by a collective structure. According to judge Cesare Terranova, they "were a mosaic of small republics with topographical borders marked by tradition." In the days before the Commission, coordination inside Cosa Nostra was ensured by informal meetings among the most influential members of the most powerful families. In fact, the decision to form a Commission was a formalisation of these occasional meetings into a permanent, collegial body.

Originally, to avoid excessive concentration of power in the hands of a few individuals, it was decided that only "men of honour" holding no leadership position within their own family – in other words, simple "soldiers" – could be appointed as members of the Commission. That rule was, however, not applied universally due to the opposition of some family-bosses who threatened to abandon the project from the start.

The Commission had two main competencies. The first was to settle conflicts among Mafia families and single members, and to enforce the most serious violations of the normative codes of Cosa Nostra. Second, the Commission was entrusted with the regulation of the use of violence. It had exclusive authority to order murder of police officials, prosecutors and judges, politicians, journalists and lawyers, because these killings could provoke retaliation by law enforcement. To limit internal conflicts, it was agreed that each family boss had to ask the Commission's authorisation before killing any member of another family.

Until the early 1980s, the Commission's competencies were often disregarded due to its collegial character and the wide autonomy for the family bosses. Only when Totò Riina, Bernardo Provenzano and the Corleonesi imposed their rule, the Commission became a central leadership body. The Commission in fact lost its autonomy and became a mere enforcement body that endorsed the decisions made by Riina and Provenzano.

=== The first Commission ===
According to Buscetta, the first Commission numbered "not many more than ten" and the number was variable. Among the members of the first Commission in the province of Palermo were:

- Salvatore Greco "Ciaschiteddu" for the Ciaculli mandamento (Palermo)
- Antonino Matranga for the Resuttana mandamento (Palermo)
- Mariano Troia for the San Lorenzo mandamento (Palermo)
- Michele Cavataio for the Acquasanta mandamento (Palermo)
- Calcedonio Di Pisa for the Noce mandamento (Palermo)
- Salvatore La Barbera for the Palermo Centro mandamento
- Cesare Manzella for the Cinisi mandamento
- Giuseppe Panno for the Casteldaccia mandamento
- Antonio Salamone for the San Giuseppe Jato mandamento
- Lorenzo Motisi for the Pagliarelli mandamento (Palermo)
- Salvatore Manno for the Boccadifalco mandamento (Palermo)
- Francesco Sorci for the Santa Maria di Gesù mandamento (Palermo)
- Mario Di Girolamo for the Corso Calatafimi mandamento (Palermo).

The Commission, however, was not able to prevent the outbreak of a violent Mafia War in 1963. Casus belli was a heroin deal gone wrong, and the subsequent killing of Calcedonio Di Pisa on December 26, 1962, who was held responsible. Instead of settling the dispute, the Commission became part of the internal conflict.

On June 30, 1963, a car bomb exploded near Greco's house in Ciaculli, killing seven police and military officers sent to defuse it after an anonymous phone call. The outrage over the Ciaculli massacre changed the Mafia war into a war against the Mafia. It prompted the first concerted anti-mafia efforts by the state in post-war Italy. The Sicilian Mafia Commission was dissolved and of those mafiosi who had escaped arrest, many went abroad. "Ciaschiteddu" Greco fled to Caracas in Venezuela.

According to Tommaso Buscetta, it was Michele Cavataio, the boss of the Acquasanta quarter of Palermo, who was responsible for the Ciaculli bomb, and possibly the murder of boss Calcedonio Di Pisa in late 1962. Cavataio had lost out to the Grecos in a war of the wholesale market in the mid-1950s. Cavataio killed Di Pisa in the knowledge that the La Barberas would be blamed by the Grecos and a war would be the result. He kept fuelling the war through other bomb attacks and killings.

Cavataio was backed by other Mafia families who resented the growing power of the Mafia Commission to the detriment of individual Mafia families. Cavataio was killed on December 10, 1969, in the so-called Viale Lazio massacre in Palermo as retaliation for the events in 1963. According to Buscetta and Grado, the composition of the hit squad was a clear indication that the killing had been sanctioned collectively by all the major Sicilian Mafia families: not only did it include Calogero Bagarella and Bernardo Provenzano from Corleone, and members of Stefano Bontade's family in Palermo, but also a soldier of Giuseppe Di Cristina's family on the other end of Sicily, in Riesi.

=== Triumvirate ===
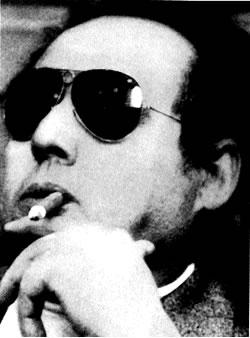
Luciano Leggio, a member of the triumvirate that was formed in 1970, at a court appearance in 1974

The crackdown on the Mafia resulted in a period of relative peace – a "pax mafiosa" – while many mafiosi were held in jail or were banished internally. The verdict of the Trial of the 114 against the Mafia in Catanzaro in December 1968 resulted in many acquittals or short sentences for criminal association. The vast majority of mafiosi had to be released given the time they had already spent in captivity while awaiting trial.

Under these circumstances, the Sicilian Mafia Commission was revived in 1970. It eventually consisted of ten members but initially it was ruled by a triumvirate consisting of Gaetano Badalamenti, Stefano Bontade and the Corleonesi boss Luciano Leggio, although it was Salvatore Riina who represented the Corleonesi, substituting Leggio who was on the run until his arrest in 1974.

In 1974, the “full” Commission was restored under the leadership of Gaetano Badalamenti. Among the members were:

- Gaetano Badalamenti for the Cinisi mandamento
- Stefano Bontade for the Santa Maria di Gesù mandamento (Palermo)
- Luciano Leggio for the Corleone mandamento, substituted by Salvatore Riina since Leggio was arrested in 1974
- Antonio Salamone for the San Giuseppe Jato mandamento, often substituted by Bernardo Brusca (father of Giovanni Brusca)
- Rosario Di Maggio for the Passo di Ragano mandamento (Palermo)
- Salvatore Scaglione for the Noce mandamento (Palermo)
- Rosario Riccobono for the Partanna mandamento (Palermo)
- Giuseppe Calò for the Porta Nuova mandamento (Palermo)
- Filippo Giacalone for the San Lorenzo mandamento (Palermo)
- Michele Greco for the Ciaculli mandamento (Palermo)
- Nenè Geraci for the Partinico mandamento

(Several pentiti, such as Salvatore Cancemi, Francesco Di Carlo and Giovanni Brusca say that Giuseppe Farinella, for the Gangi-San Mauro Castelverde mandamento, Francesco Intile for the Caccamo mandamento and Antonio Mineo for the Bagheria mandamento, were or became members as well.)

During these years, tensions between different coalitions within the Commission increased. In this period, the Commission was increasingly dominated by the coalition led by Totò Riina and Bernardo Provenzano that was opposed by Gaetano Badalamenti and Stefano Bontade. Riina and Provenzano secretly formed an alliance of mafiosi in different families, cutting across clan divisions, in defiance of the rules concerning loyalty in Cosa Nostra. This secretive inter-family group became known as the Corleonesi. The wing headed by Badalamenti and Bontade defended the existing balance of power between the single Mafia families and the Commission.

Thanks to a manipulation of the rules and elimination of its most powerful rivals - in particular, the 1978 killings of Giuseppe Calderone and Giuseppe Di Cristina, members of the Interprovincial Commission - the Corleonesi coalition was able to increase its power within the Commission. Their rivals were overwhelmed and lost any power to strike back. Beside using violence, the Corleonesi also imposed their supremacy by exploiting a competence of the Commission: the power to suspend leaders of a family and to name a reggente, a temporary boss.

=== The 1978 Commission ===
In 1978, Gaetano Badalamenti was expelled from the Commission and as head of his Family. Michele Greco replaced him as the secretary of the Commission. Badalamenti's removal marked the end of a period of relative peace and signified a major change in the Mafia itself. In 1978, the Commission was composed by:

- Michele Greco for the Ciaculli mandamento (Palermo), acting as the secretary
- Salvatore Riina and Bernardo Provenzano for the Corleone mandamento
- Stefano Bontade for the Santa Maria di Gesù mandamento (Palermo)
- Salvatore Inzerillo for the Passo di Rigano mandamento (Palermo)
- Giuseppe Calò for the Porta Nuova mandamento (Palermo)
- Antonio Salamone for the San Giuseppe Jato mandamento, often substituted by Bernardo Brusca (father of Giovanni Brusca) because Salamone resided in São Paulo in Brazil
- Salvatore Scaglione for the Noce mandamento (Palermo)
- Rosario Riccobono for the Partanna mandamento (Palermo)
- Francesco Madonia for the Resuttana mandamento (Palermo)
- Nenè Geraci for the Partinico mandamento
- Calogero Pizzuto for the Castronovo di Sicilia mandamento
- Ignazio Motisi for the Pagliarelli mandamento (Palermo)

The Commission was divided between the Corleonesi (Riina, Calò, Madonia, Brusca, Geraci, Greco, Motisi and probably Scaglione as well) and the group Bontade, Inzerillo and Pizzuto. A third group, Michele Greco, Riccobono and Salamone were not hostile to the group of Bontade but were against Gaetano Badalamenti.

While the more established Mafia families in the city of Palermo refrained from openly killing authorities because that would attract too much police attention, the Corleonesi deliberately killed to intimidate the authorities in such a way that the suspicion fell on their rivals in the Commission. In 1979, Pino Greco from Ciaculli also known as Scarpuzzedda and Riina's favourite hit man entered the Commission as well.

Instead of avoiding conflict, the Commission increasingly became an instrument in the unfolding power struggle that eventually led to the quasi-dictatorship of Totò Riina. Members of the Commission were no longer freely selected by the provinces but were chosen on the basis of their allegiance to Riina's faction, and eventually were only called to legitimize decisions that had already been made elsewhere.

=== Second Mafia War ===
Mafia boss Stefano Bontade, the "Prince of Villagrazia", who was killed by the Corleonesi in 1981

The Second Mafia War raged from 1981 to 1983. On April 23, 1981, Bontade was machine-gunned to death in his car in Palermo. Bontade's close ally, Salvatore Inzerillo, was killed three weeks later with the same Kalashnikov. The Corleonesi slaughtered the ruling families of the Palermo Mafia to take control of the organisation while waging a parallel war against Italian authorities and law enforcement to intimidate and prevent effective investigations and prosecutions. More than 200 mafiosi were killed and many simply disappeared.

In 1982, the Commission members were:

- Salvatore Riina and Bernardo Provenzano for the Corleone mandamento
- Giuseppe Calò for the Porta Nuova mandamento (Palermo)
- Michele Greco for the Ciaculli mandamento (Palermo)
- Giovanni Scaduto for the Bagheria mandamento
- Rosario Riccobono for the Partanna mandamento (Palermo)
- Francesco Madonia for the Resuttana mandamento (Palermo)
- Andrea Di Carlo for the Altofonte mandamento
- Nenè Geraci for the Partinico mandamento
- Bernardo Brusca for the San Giuseppe Jato mandamento
- Mariano Agate for the Mazara del Vallo mandamento (province of Trapani)
- Pino Greco of Ciaculli

The Commission was now dominated by Riina and Provenzano. More and more, the independence of Mafia families was superseded by the authoritarian rule of Riina. Nor did the killing end when the main rivals of the Corleonesi were defeated. Whoever could challenge Riina or had lost their usefulness was eliminated. Rosario Riccobono and a dozen men of his clan were killed in November 1982. Sometime in September 1985, Pino Greco was murdered in his home, shot to death by his two fellow Mafiosi and supposed friends, Vincenzo Puccio and Giuseppe Lucchese, although the orders came from Riina, who felt Greco was getting too ambitious and too independently minded for his liking.

The Commission in fact lost its autonomy and became a mere enforcement body that enforced the decisions made by Riina and Provenzano and their close group of allies. According to Buscetta: "With the power gained by the Corleonesi and their allies the traditional organizational structures had a purely formal value … the decisions were taken before … and the Commission was nothing but the faithful executor of orders."

Meanwhile, new mandamenti were formed in 1983, whose members entered the Commission: Raffaele Ganci for the Noce mandamento, Giuseppe Giacomo Gambino for the San Lorenzo mandamento, Matteo Motisi for the Pagliarelli mandamento and Salvatore Buscemi for the Passo di Ragano-Boccadifalco mandamento. In 1986-87 the Santa Maria di Gesù mandamento (the former fiefdom of Stefano Bontade) was reinstated, represented by Pietro Aglieri.

Since the arrests as a result of the revelations of pentiti such as Tommaso Buscetta, Salvatore Contorno, Francesco Marino Mannoia and Antonino Calderone, and the Maxi Trial in the 1980s many Commission members ended up in jail. They were substituted by a so-called sostituto or reggente.

=== The 1992 Commission ===
In 1992 the Commission that decided to kill the politician and Prime Minister Giulio Andreotti’s right-hand man on Sicily Salvo Lima and the judges Giovanni Falcone and Paolo Borsellino was composed of:

- Salvatore Riina and Bernardo Provenzano for the Corleone mandamento
- Salvatore Cancemi for the Porta Nuova mandamento (Palermo), substituting Giuseppe Calò who was in prison
- Raffaele Ganci for the Noce mandamento (Palermo)
- Matteo Motisi for the Pagliarelli mandamento (Palermo)
- Salvatore Biondino and/or Mariano Tullio Troia for the San Lorenzo mandamento (Palermo), substituting Giuseppe Giacomo Gambino who was in prison
- Pietro Aglieri and Carlo Greco for the Guadagna-Santa Maria di Gesù mandamento (Palermo)
- the brothers Giuseppe Graviano and Filippo Graviano for the Brancaccio-Ciaculli mandamento, substituting Giuseppe Lucchese who was in prison
- Francesco Madonia for the Resuttana mandamento (Palermo)
- Michelangelo La Barbera for the Passo di Ragano-Boccadifalco mandamento (Palermo), substituting Salvatore Buscemi who was in prison
- Giuseppe Farinella for the Gangi-San Mauro Castelverde mandamento
- Giovanni Brusca for the San Giuseppe Jato mandamento, substituting his father Bernardo Brusca who was in prison
- Giuseppe Montalto for the Villabate mandamento, substituting his father Salvatore Montalto who was in prison
- Antonino Giuffrè for the Caccamo mandamento
- Nenè Geraci for the Partinico mandamento
- Benedetto Spera for the Belmonte Mezzagno mandamento

=== Provenzano's new Mafia ===
Provenzano proposed a new less violent Mafia strategy instead of the terrorist bombing campaign in 1993 against the state to get them to back off in their crackdown against the Mafia after the murders of anti-mafia prosecutors Giovanni Falcone and Paolo Borsellino. Following the months after Riina's arrest in January 1993, there were a series of bombings by the Corleonesi against several tourist spots on the Italian mainland – the Via dei Georgofili in Florence, in Milan and the Piazza San Giovanni in Laterano and Via San Teodoro in Rome, which left 10 people dead and 93 injured as well as severe damage to centres of cultural heritage such as the Uffizi Gallery. Leoluca Bagarella, Riina's successor, was captured on June 24, 1995, Bagarella was arrested, having been a fugitive for four years.

Provenzano then took the reins, establishing new guidelines: patience, compartmentalisation, coexistence with state institutions, and systematic infiltration of public finance. The diplomatic Provenzano tried to stem the flow of pentiti by not targeting their families, only using violence in case of absolute necessity. Provenzano reportedly re-established the old Mafia rules that had been abolished by Totò Riina, together with Riina and Leoluca Bagarella, he was ruling the Corleonesi faction.

Giovanni Brusca – one of Riina's hitmen who personally detonated the bomb that killed Falcone, and later became an informant after his 1996 arrest – has offered a controversial version of the capture of Totò Riina: a secret deal between Carabinieri officers, secret agents and Cosa Nostra bosses tired of the dictatorship of the Corleonesi. According to Brusca, Provenzano "sold" Riina in exchange for the valuable archive of compromising material that Riina held in his apartment in Via Bernini 52 in Palermo.

The Sicilian Mafia had been divided between those bosses who support a hard line against the Italian state – mainly bosses who are in prison such as Salvatore 'Totò' Riina (deceased since 2017) and Leoluca Bagarella – and those who support the more moderate strategy of Provenzano. The incarcerated bosses are currently subjected to harsh controls on their contact with the outside world, limiting their ability to run their operations from behind bars under the article 41-bis prison regime.

Antonino Giuffrè – a close confidant of Provenzano, turned pentito shortly after his capture in April 2002 – alleges that in 1993, Cosa Nostra had direct contact with representatives of former Prime Minister Silvio Berlusconi while he was planning the birth of Forza Italia. The deal that he says was alleged to have been made was a repeal of 41 bis, among other anti-Mafia laws in return for delivering electoral gains in Sicily. Giuffrè's declarations have not been confirmed.

During a court appearance in July 2002, Leoluca Bagarella suggested unnamed politicians had failed to maintain agreements with the Mafia over prison conditions. "We are tired of being exploited, humiliated, harassed and used as merchandise by political factions," he said. Nevertheless, the Italian Parliament, with the support of Forza Italia, subsequently prolonged the enforcement of 41 bis, which was to expire in 2002, for another four years and extended it to other crimes such as terrorism. However, according to one of Italy's leading magazines, L’Espresso, 119 mafiosi – one-fifth of those incarcerated under the 41-bis regime – have been released on an individual basis.

=== Division and rivalry ===
In 2002 a rift within Cosa Nostra became clear. On the one hand there were the hardline "Corleonesi" in jail – led by Totò Riina and Leoluca Bagarella – and on the other the more moderate "Palermitani" – led by Provenzano and Antonino Giuffrè, Salvatore Lo Piccolo and Matteo Messina Denaro. Apparently the arrest of Giuffrè in April 2002 was made possible by an anonymous phone call that seems to have been made by loyalists to the Mafia hardliners Riina and Bagarella. The purpose was to send a message to Provenzano. The incarcerated bosses wanted something to be done about the harsh prison conditions (in particular the relaxation of the 41-bis incarceration regime) – and were believed to be orchestrating a return to violence while serving multiple life sentences.

Targets were to have been Marcello Dell'Utri and former Defence Minister Cesare Previti, both close advisors of then Prime Minister Silvio Berlusconi, according to a leaked report of the intelligence service SISDE. Riina and Bagarella felt betrayed by political allies in Rome, who had promised to help pass laws to ease prison conditions and reduce sentences for its jailed members in exchange for Mafia support at the polls. The SISDE report says they believed that hits on either of the two embattled members of Berlusconi's Forza Italia party — each under separate criminal indictments — would have been less likely to provoke the kind of public outrage and police crackdown that followed the 1992 murders of the widely admired Sicilian prosecutors Giovanni Falcone and Paolo Borsellino.

According to press reports, when Provenzano was moved to the high security prison in Terni, Totò Riina's son Giovanni Riina, who has been sentenced to life imprisonment for three murders, yelled that Provenzano was a "sbirro" – a popular Italian pejorative expression for a police officer – when Provenzano entered the cell block. The pentito Antonino Giuffrè has said in October 2005 that there had been rumours within Cosa Nostra that Provenzano was an informer for the Carabinieri while he was on the run.

=== After Provenzano's arrest ===
After the arrest of Bernardo Provenzano on April 11, 2006 – on the same day as Romano Prodi's victory in the 2006 Italian general election against Silvio Berlusconi – several mafiosi were mentioned as Provenzano's successor. Among the rivals were Matteo Messina Denaro (from Castelvetrano and the province of Trapani), Salvatore Lo Piccolo (boss of Tommaso Natale area and the mandamento of San Lorenzo in Palermo), and Domenico Raccuglia from Altofonte. Provenzano allegedly nominated Messina Denaro in one of his pizzini – small slips of paper used to communicate with other mafiosi to avoid phone conversations, found at Provenzano's hide out.

This presupposes that Provenzano has the power to nominate a successor, which is not unanimously accepted among Mafia observers. "The Mafia today is more of a federation and less of an authoritarian state," according to anti-Mafia prosecutor Antonio Ingroia of the Direzione distrettuale antimafia (DDA) of Palermo, referring to the previous period of authoritarian rule under Salvatore Riina. Provenzano "established a kind of directorate of about four to seven people who met very infrequently, only when necessary, when there were strategic decisions to make."

According to Ingroia "in an organization like the Mafia, a boss has to be one step above the others otherwise it all falls apart. It all depends on if he can manage consensus and if the others agree or rebel." Provenzano "guaranteed a measure of stability because he had the authority to quash internal disputes." Among the members of the directorate were Salvatore Lo Piccolo; Antonino Giuffrè from Caccamo; Benedetto Spera from Belmonte Mezzagno; Salvatore Rinella from Trabia; Giuseppe Balsano from Monreale; Matteo Messina Denaro from Castelvetrano; Vincenzo Virga from Trapani; and Andrea Manciaracina from Mazara del Vallo.

After the arrests of Benedetto Spera, Vincenzo Virga (both in 2001) and Antonino Giuffrè in 2002 (who decided to cooperate with the authorities), the leadership of Cosa Nostra was in the hands of the fugitives Bernardo Provenzano, Salvatore Lo Piccolo and Matteo Messina Denaro. Following Provenzano's capture in April 2006, Italy's intelligence service report warned of "emerging tensions" between mafia groups as a result of Provenzano's failure to designate either Salvatore Lo Piccolo or Matteo Messina Denaro as his successor. The Direzione Investigativa Antimafia (DIA) cautioned that the capture of Provenzano could potentially present mafia leaders an opportunity to return to violence as a means of expressing their power.

Two months after Provenzano's arrest, on June 20, 2006, authorities issued 52 arrest warrants against the top echelon of Cosa Nostra in the city of Palermo (Operation Gotha). Study of the pizzini showed that Provenzano's joint deputies in Palermo were Salvatore Lo Piccolo and Antonio Rotolo, capo-mandamento of Pagliarelli. In a message referring to an important decision for Cosa Nostra, Provenzano told Rotolo: "It's up to you, me and Lo Piccolo to decide this thing."

The investigations showed that Rotolo had built a kind of federation within the mafia, comprising 13 families grouped in four clans. His right-hand men were Antonio Cinà – who used to be the personal physician of Salvatore Riina and Provenzano – and the builder Francesco Bonura. The city of Palermo was ruled by this triumvirate replacing the Commission whose members are all in jail.

What emerged as well was that the position of Salvatore Lo Piccolo was not undisputed. Authorities said they avoided the outbreak of a genuine war inside Cosa Nostra. The first clash would have been between Rotolo and Lo Piccolo. What sparked off the crisis was a request from the Inzerillo family, one of the clans whose leaders – among them Salvatore Inzerillo – were killed by the Corleonesi during the Second Mafia War in the 1980s and which are now in exile in the United States. Rotolo had passed a death sentence on Lo Piccolo and his son, Sandro, even before Provenzano's arrest – and even procured the barrels of acid that are used to dissolve the bodies of slain rivals.

=== Reconstitution thwarted ===
In December 2008, an attempt to reconstitute a new Commission was foiled, when 94 Mafiosi were arrested after a nine-month investigation dubbed "Operation Perseus" (Perseo in Italian; after the Greek mythological hero Perseus who beheaded Medusa). From tapped phone conversations and surveillance, police had obtained a full list of those present and those who had sent their apologies, as well as details of the issues discussed and the decisions adopted.

The object, as one tapped Mafioso put it, was to "re-establish Cosa Nostra" in the old style, with a single all-powerful boss, a "capo dei capi". Benedetto Capizzi, a 65-year-old boss from Villagrazia, had been nominated as the possible head of the Commission. Among the other members were other historical Cosa Nostra bosses, such as Gerlando Alberti, Gregorio Agrigento from San Giuseppe Jato, Giovanni Lipari, Gaetano Fidanzati, Giuseppe Scaduto from Bagheria and Salvatore Lombardo, the 87-year-old boss from Montelepre. Many of those arrested had recently been released from prison on health grounds, and were serving out their sentences under house arrest.

Among the younger bosses were Gianni Nicchi, the young and upcoming boss from Pagliarelli and Giuseppe Biondino, the son of Salvatore Biondino who had been Riina's driver. A preliminary summit meeting had been held on November 14, 2008, with Lo Presti, Scaduto, Capizzi – and also Nicchi. The new Commission had the blessing of the old bosses Totò Riina and Bernardo Provenzano, as well as Matteo Messina Denaro, the boss from the province of Trapani. Not everyone agreed, however. Gaetano Lo Presti from the Porta Nuova family objected to the choice of Capizzi as the new head. He committed suicide after his arrest. Police feared the outbreak of a new Mafia war and decided to interfere. Nicchi and Fidanzati escaped the arrests, but were captured later. After the death of Riina on 17 November 2017, Settimo Mineo was elected the new head on 29 May 2018 until his arrest on 4 December 2018.

== Composition and leadership ==
=== Mandamentos and bosses ===
Mandamento	Capo mandamento	Notes
First Commission (1957–1963)
Chairman	Salvatore Greco (Ciaculli)	Fled to Venezuela on 30 June 1963, died from liver disease in 1978
Boccadifalco, Palermo	Salvatore Manno	
Acquasanta, Palermo	Michele Cavataio	Murdered on 10 December 1969
Noce, Palermo	Calcedonio Di Pisa	Murdered on 26 December 1962
Resuttana, Palermo	Antonino Matranga	Murdered on 30 April 1970
San Lorenzo, Palermo	Mariano Troia	
Villagrazia, Palermo	Francesco Sorci	Murdered on 22 June 1963
Palermo Centro	Salvatore La Barbera	Disappeared on 17 January 1963
Cinisi	Cesare Manzella	Murdered by car bombing on 26 April 1963
San Giuseppe Jato	Antonio Salamone	Fled to São Paulo in 1963; died of cancer on 31 May 1998
Casteldaccia	Giuseppe Panno	Disappeared on 11 March 1981
Calatafimi	Mario Di Girolamo	
Second Commission (1974–2006)
Chairman	1974–1978: Gaetano Badalamenti (Cinisi)	Fled to São Paulo in 1978; sentenced for 45 years on 22 June 1987
Chairman	1978–1986: Michele Greco (Ciaculli-Croceverde-Giardini)	Arrested on 19 February 1986 and sentenced for life prison on 13 December 1987
Chairman	1986–1993: Salvatore Riina (Corleone)	Fugitive since 1969; arrested and imprisoned for life on 15 January 1993
Chairman	1993–1995: Leoluca Bagarella, Bernardo Provenzano (Corleone)	Fugitive since 1992; arrested and imprisoned for life on 24 June 1995
Chairman	1995–2006: Bernardo Provenzano (Corleone)	Fugitive since 1963; arrested and imprisoned for life on 11 April 2006
Noce, Palermo	Before 1982: Salvatore Scaglione	Murdered on 30 November 1982
Noce, Palermo	1982–1993: Raffaele Ganci	Sentenced for life prison on 10 June 1993
Resuttana, Palermo	Before 1987: Francesco Madonia	Sentenced for life prison on 13 December 1987
Resuttana, Palermo	Since 1987: Antonino Madonia	Sentenced for life prison in December 1989
Villagrazia-Santa Maria di Gesù, Palermo	Before 1981: Stefano Bontate	Murdered on 23 April 1981
Villagrazia-Santa Maria di Gesù, Palermo	1981–1988: Giovanni Bontate	Murdered on 28 September 1988
Villagrazia-Santa Maria di Gesù, Palermo	1988–1997: Pietro Aglieri	Sentenced for life prison on 6 June 1997
Porta Nuova, Palermo	Giuseppe Calò	Sentenced for life prison on 13 December 1987
Boccadifalco-Passo di Rigano, Palermo	Before 1980: Rosario Di Maggio	Died by heart attack in 1980
Boccadifalco-Passo di Rigano, Palermo	1980–1981: Salvatore Inzerillo	Murdered on 11 May 1981
Boccadifalco-Passo di Rigano, Palermo	Since 1981: Salvatore Buscemi	Sentenced for life prison on 13 December 1987
Partanna-Mondello and San Lorenzo, Palermo	1974–1982: Rosario Riccobono	Murdered on 30 November 1982
Partanna-Mondello and San Lorenzo, Palermo	1982–1993: Giuseppe Giacomo Gambino	Arrested and imprisoned for life on 15 January 1993; committed suicide on 30 November 1996
Partanna-Mondello and San Lorenzo, Palermo	Since 1993: Salvatore Lo Piccolo	Fugitive since 1983; arrested and imprisoned for life on 5 November 2007
Pagliarelli, Palermo	Before 1983: Ignazio Motisi	Arrested in 1983; assolved in April 1988
Pagliarelli, Palermo	Since 1983: Matteo Motisi	Sentenced for life prison
Corleone	1958–1974: Luciano Leggio	Arrested and sentenced for life prison on 16 May 1974
Corleone	1974–1993: Salvatore Riina	Fugitive since 1969; arrested and imprisoned for life on 15 January 1993
Corleone	1993–2006: Bernardo Provenzano	Fugitive since 1963; arrested and imprisoned for life on 11 April 2006
Partinico	Antonio Geraci	Sentenced for life prison on 13 December 1987
San Giuseppe Jato	Before 1981: Antonio Salamone	Fled to São Paulo in 1963; died of cancer on 31 May 1998
San Giuseppe Jato	1981–1985: Bernardo Brusca	Sentenced for life prison on 26 November 1985
San Giuseppe Jato	1985–1996: Giovanni Brusca	Arrested and became in pentito on 20 May 1996
Gangi-San Mauro Castelverde	Giuseppe Farinella	Sentenced for life prison on 21 March 1992
Bagheria-Villabate-Misilmeri	Before 1981: Giovanni Scaduto	
Bagheria-Villabate-Misilmeri	1981–1995: Salvatore Montalto	Sentenced for life prison on 17 January 1991; deceased in prison on 4 April 2012
Bagheria-Villabate-Misilmeri	Since 1995: Gabriele Cammarata	Sentenced for life prison on 12 January 1996
Castronovo di Sicilia-Caccamo	Before 1981: Calogero Pizzuto	Murdered on 29 September 1981
Castronovo di Sicilia-Caccamo	Since 1981: Francesco Intile	Sentenced for life prison on 4 May 1995; committed suicide the same day
Third Commission (2007–2008)
Chairman	2007: Salvatore Lo Piccolo (San Lorenzo)	Fugitive since 1983; arrested and imprisoned for life on November 5, 2007
Chairman	2007–2008: Benedetto Capizzi (Villagrazia)	Arrested on December 16, 2008
Porta Nuova, Palermo	Gaetano Lo Presti	Arrested on December 16, 2008; committed suicide in prison
Pagliarelli, Palermo	Giovanni Nicchi	Sentenced for 13 years on January 21, 2008
Villagrazia-Santa Maria di Gesù, Palermo	Giovanni Adelfio (acting)	Sentenced for 9 years on March 12, 2009
Noce, Palermo	Luigi Caravello	Arrested and imprisoned on December 16, 2008
Resuttana, Palermo	Gaetano Fidanzati	Arrested on December 16, 2008; imprisoned on December 5, 2009; died in prison on October 5, 2013
Brancaccio-Ciaculli	Antonino Lo Nigro	Imprisoned on March 12, 2009
Belmonte Mezzagno	Antonino Spera	Sentenced for 15 years on March 16, 2010
Bagheria	Giuseppe Scaduto	Arrested on December 16, 2008; imprisoned on October 30, 2017
Corleone	Rosario Lo Bue	Sentenced for 15 years on May 2, 2018
San Giuseppe Jato	Gregorio Agrigento	
San Mauro Castelverde	Francesco Bonomo	
Trabia	Antonino Teresi	
Fourth Commission (2018–2019)
Chairman
Chairman	2018: Settimo Mineo (Pagliarelli, elected 29 May 2018)	Arrested on December 4, 2018
Chairman	2018: Calogero Lo Piccolo (San Lorenzo)	Arrested on January 22, 2019
Chairman	2018: Leandro Greco (Ciaculli)	Arrested on January 22, 2019
Porta Nuova, Palermo	Gregorio Di Giovanni	Arrested on December 4, 2018
Misilmeri - Belmonte Mezzagno	Filippo Bisconti	Arrested on December 4, 2018
Villabate	Francesco Colletti	Arrested on December 4, 2018

== Sources ==
- Abbate + 706: Tribunale di Palermo, Ufficio Istruzione Processi Penali (N. 22S9/82 R.G.U.I.), 8 November 1984. Ordinanza-Sentenza emessa nel procedimento penale contro Abbate Giovanni + 706. In: Il Maxiprocesso di Palermo, Commissione parlamentare di inchiesta sul fenomeno delle mafie e sulle altre associazioni criminali, anche straniere, XIX legislatura, Doc. XXIII, n. 9, 20 May 2025
- Arlacchi, Pino (1988). Gli uomini del disonore. La mafia siciliana nella vita del grande pentito Antonino Calderone, Milan: Mondadori ISBN 88-04-35326-0
- Dickie, John (2004). Cosa Nostra. A history of the Sicilian Mafia, London: Hodder & Stoughton, ISBN 0-340-82435-2
- Gambetta, Diego (1993).The Sicilian Mafia: The Business of Private Protection, London: Harvard University Press, ISBN 0-674-80742-1
- Padovani, Marcelle & Giovanni Falcone (1992). Men of Honour: The Truth About the Mafia, HarperCollins, ISBN 1-85702-024-3
- Paoli, Letizia (2003). Mafia Brotherhoods: Organized Crime, Italian Style, Oxford/New York: Oxford University Press ISBN 0-19-515724-9
- Schneider, Jane T. & Peter T. Schneider (2003). Reversible Destiny: Mafia, Antimafia, and the Struggle for Palermo, Berkeley: University of California Press ISBN 0-520-23609-2
- Servadio, Gaia (1976), Mafioso. A history of the Mafia from its origins to the present day, London: Secker & Warburg ISBN 0-436-44700-2
- Sterling, Claire (1990). Octopus. How the long reach of the Sicilian Mafia controls the global narcotics trade, New York: Simon & Schuster, ISBN 0-671-73402-4.
- Stille, Alexander (1995). Excellent Cadavers. The Mafia and the Death of the First Italian Republic, New York: Vintage ISBN 0-09-959491-9
