= Benedetto Capizzi =

Member of the Sicilian Mafia (1944–2023)

Capizzi at his arrest in 2008

Benedetto Capizzi (28 June 1944 – 12 September 2023) was an Italian mobster and a boss of the Sicilian Mafia, from the Villagrazia area of Palermo. He was nominated to be the head of the new Sicilian Mafia Commission.

On 16 December 2008, Capizzi was among 94 Mafiosi arrested in "Operation Perseus" (Perseo in Italian; after the Greek mythological hero Perseus who beheaded Medusa). The operation foiled an attempt to reconstitute a new Mafia Commission after the arrests of Mafia bosses Bernardo Provenzano, Antonio Rotolo, and Salvatore Lo Piccolo in 2006 and 2007. The object, as one tapped Mafioso put it, was to "re-establish Cosa Nostra" in the old style, with a single all-powerful boss, a "capo di capi".

Capizzi had been nominated as the possible head of the Commission. Among the other members were other historical Cosa Nostra bosses, such as Gerlando Alberti, Gregorio Agrigento from San Giuseppe Jato, Giovanni Lipari, Gaetano Fidanzati, Giuseppe Scaduto from Bagheria, and Salvatore Lombardo, the 87-year-old boss from Montelepre. Many of those arrested had recently been released from prison on health grounds, and were serving out their sentences under house arrest.

When told of the decision to appoint Capizzi, another boss, Gaetano Lo Presti, appointed boss of Porta Nuova area of Palermo in 2007 by Lo Piccolo, challenged the decision, demanding: "Who authorised this?" The implication was that he believed Lo Presti had more claim to the top job than Capizzi. There was also the suggestion of a new round of "Mafia wars" on the streets of Sicily. It was this fear that led police to bring their assault forward and launch an operation that resulted in 94 arrests. Lo Presti, whose indiscretions on the telephone prompted Italian police to launch the operation, hanged himself in his prison cell, hours after being arrested.

In 2010, after Gaspare Spatuzza became a pentito, Capizzi was sentenced to 30 years in prison for his roles in the murder of Giuseppe Di Matteo.

Capizzi died on 12 September 2023, at the age of 79.
