= Pietro Aglieri =

Member of the Sicilian Mafia

- Aglieri in 1997
- Born: 9 June 1959; Palermo, Sicily, Italy
- Other name: 'u Signurinu ("The Little Gentleman")
- Occupation: Mafia boss
- Status: Imprisoned since 1997
- Allegiance: Corleonesi
- Convictions: Mafia association multiple murder
- Criminal charges: Mafia association multiple murders
- Penalty: Life imprisonment

Pietro Aglieri (Italian pronunciation: [ˈpjɛːtro aʎˈʎɛːri]; born 9 June 1959) is a Sicilian mafioso from the Guadagna neighbourhood of Palermo. He is known as 'u Signurinu ("The Little Gentleman") for his relatively sophisticated education and refined manners. He had a classical education and studied Greek, Latin, philosophy, history and literature to a level that guaranteed him entry to university. Instead he chose a career in Cosa Nostra. The British newspaper The Guardian listed him as the emerging man of the year 1995 in Italy.

== Mafia career ==
Aglieri was a loyal supporter of the Corleonesi clan of Totò Riina and Bernardo Provenzano during the Second Mafia War. He gained Riina's favour by killing relatives of rival Mafia bosses. He became the boss of the Santa Maria di Gesù Mafia family after Giovanni Bontade – the brother of Stefano Bontade – was killed in 1988. Although active since the early 1980s, his name was not brought to prosecutors' attention until 1989.

As a member of the Sicilian Mafia Commission, Aglieri was being tried in absentia for the 1992 bombing deaths of Italy's two top Mafia investigators, Giovanni Falcone and Paolo Borsellino, for which he received life sentences. He also received a life sentence for the murder of judge Antonino Scopelliti on 9 August 1991, who was killed while preparing the final sentence for the Maxi Trial for the Court of Cassation. He was also on trial for the 1992 murder of Salvo Lima, a Sicilian politician with close links to Giulio Andreotti, the former premier accused of Mafia association.

After the arrest of Riina in January 1993, Aglieri started to support Provenzano's new less violent mafia strategy. The new guidelines were patience, compartmentalisation, coexistence with state institutions, and systematic infiltration of public finance. The diplomatic Provenzano tried to stem the flow of pentiti by not targeting their families, only using violence in case of absolute necessity.

On 6 June 1997 Aglieri was arrested in a disused lemon warehouse in the dilapidated industrial area of Bagheria together with his lieutenants, Natale Gambino and Giuseppe La Mattina. It took the authorities almost a year to locate him following the arrest of his right-hand man Carlo Greco. Apparently, Giovanni Brusca, a Riina loyalist arrested in May 1996, helped police identify Aglieri. He had been on the run since 1989.

== Alleged dissociation ==
On 28 March 2002 Pietro Aglieri wrote a letter to the National Anti-mafia Prosecutor (DNA), Pierluigi Vigna and the Chief Prosecutor of Palermo, Pietro Grasso to ask for negotiations. His proposal was that mafiosi would get more lenient penalties (in particular the relaxation of the 41-bis prison regime) in return for recognizing the existence of Cosa Nostra and the authority of the Italian state.

Aglieri had been approached by Vigna in February 2000 in an attempt to get mafiosi to "dissociate" from Cosa Nostra — without becoming collaborators of justice — a method that was used successfully in the struggle against the Red Brigades. Ex-Red Brigades members could publicly recognise their errors without having to admit their own criminal responsibilities.

Aglieri proposed a meeting of the Sicilian Mafia Commission in a jail somewhere in Italy to convince Totò Riina to agree with the Mafia's surrender and to hand over the Mafia's armoury. Other bosses like Giuseppe "Piddu" Madonia, Nitto Santapaola, Pippo Calò and Giuseppe Farinella appeared to agree. Vigna also approached the mafiosi Piddu Madonia, Giuseppe Farinella and Salvatore Buscemi. Vigna's covert attempts were controversial and were made public by a mole in the DNA. They were definitively frustrated when the centre-left government of Massimo D'Alema resigned on 25 April 2000. Minister of Justice, Oliviero Diliberto, was replaced with Piero Fassino who stopped the negotiations.

Aglieri's letter in March 2002 was followed by the statements of Leoluca Bagarella during a court appearance in July 2002 in which he suggested that unnamed politicians had failed to maintain agreements with the Mafia over prison conditions. That seemed to make an end to try to convince mafiosi to "dissociate" from the Mafia, not only because of resistance in the judiciary and the Anti-mafia movement, but also because of a rift within Cosa Nostra.

Aglieri's dissociation proposal was not accepted. Most investigative magistrates opposed the proposal, realising it would leave Cosa Nostra intact and would restore the hidden relationship between the Mafia's shadow state and Mafia-friendly authorities.

== Personality ==
After his arrest, a little chapel was discovered inside Aglieri's hideout, a clear sign of his devotion to the Catholic Church. A priest, Mario Frittitta, admitted in 1997 meeting Aglieri and celebrating Mass for him and his men on Christmas 1996 and Easter 1997 at the hideout. Father Frittitta told a court that he tried to persuade Aglieri to turn himself in, but not to testify against others. After his arrest, Aglieri announced he wanted to study theology – but a leading Sicilian bishop refused him permission. Nevertheless, Aglieri started to study church history with La Sapienza University in Rome while in Rebibbia prison and graduated in theology. Among his fellow mafiosi he was known for his love of the Greek and Latin classics.

In an interview with La Repubblica in March 2004, he said he preferred the harsh incarceration regime of 41-bis over being a collaborator of justice. Judge Alfonso Sabella, remembered that when he arrested Aglieri and hoped he would start to collaborate with the authorities, the Mafia boss gave him a lecture on the power of the Mafia: “Look, Inspector, when you come into our schools to speak of legality, justice, respect for the law, of civil co-existence, our youth will listen to you and follow you, but when these youngsters come of age and look for work, a house, economic and health assistance, where do they find them? With you or with us? Inspector, they find them with us. And, only with us. You’re Sicilian, and you know very well it’s like this. Why should I cooperate, eh? Just so you can arrest another dozen fathers of families or to let you find a few rusty pistols. What would change if I told you what you want to know from me?”

== See also ==
- Massacre of Via D'Amelio

== Bibliography ==
- Dickie, John (2004). Cosa Nostra. A history of the Sicilian Mafia, London: Coronet ISBN 0-340-82435-2
- Dickie, John (2013). Mafia Republic: Italy's Criminal Curse. Cosa Nostra, 'Ndrangheta and Camorra from 1946 to the Present, Hachette UK
- Jamieson, Alison (2000). The Antimafia. Italy’s fight against organized crime, London: MacMillan Press Ltd ISBN 0-333-80158-X
- Longrigg, Clare (2008). Boss of Bosses. How Bernardo Provenzano saved the Mafia, London: John Murray ISBN 978-0-7195-6849-7
