= Settimo Mineo =

Italian member of the Sicilian Mafia

- Born: 28 November 1938 (age 87); Palermo, Sicily, Italy
- Other name: "Tonton Settimo"
- Occupations: Mafia boss Head of the Sicilian Mafia Commission
- Status: Imprisoned since 2018
- Allegiance: Pagliarelli Mafia family / Sicilian Mafia

Settimo Mineo (Italian pronunciation: [ˈsɛttimo miˈnɛːo]; born 28 November 1938) is an Italian member of the Sicilian Mafia, capo of the Pagliarelli Mafia family and eventually of the Pagliarelli mandamento from Palermo, until his arrest in 2018.

== Biography ==
Settimo Mineo, known as "Tonton Settimo", was born in Palermo in 1938. He officially owns a jewelry shop in the Palermo, but is considered the oldest boss of the Sicilian Mafia. In 1982, he escaped an ambush that cost the life of his brother Giuseppe, while in 1981 his brother Antonino was murdered. Testified against by pentito Tommaso Buscetta, he was sentenced to five years in prison in the Maxi Trial. After he was released from prison, he was then re-arrested in 2006 and sentenced in the "Gotha" trial. He was released in 2013 by decision of the Supreme Court of Cassation.

Despite being a former associate of Antonio Rotolo, a historical ally of the Corleonesi, in recent years Mineo made alliances with the cousins Franco and Tommaso Inzerillo, members of the Inzerillo Mafia clan and had as his right-hand man, Salvatore Sorrentino, all of them known rivals of Rotolo and of the Corleonesi, showing that Settimo Mineo had changed sides inside the Cosa Nostra.

On 29 May 2018, Mineo was elected the new head of the Sicilian Mafia Commission after the death of Salvatore Riina. On 4 December 2018, he was re-arrested in the operation "Cupola 2.0" conducted by the Carabinieri, on charges to be the new head of the "Dome" of Cosa Nostra.

According to investigators, after Mineo's arrest, he was replaced by Giuseppe Calvaruso as the new head of the Pagliarelli mandamento. Calvaruso was Settimo Mineo's most trusted man, and is known for his peculiar and very modern entrepreneurial attitude in managing the Pagliarelli mandamento.

== Personal life ==
Before his arrest, Mineo was known for his charisma and mediation skills; he did not use mobile phones for fear of being intercepted, and also moved on foot, even to visit other Mafia bosses. Mineo and his wife would go to mass at the Church of San Giovanni Decollato in Ballarò, Palermo, and for a year even participated in a volunteer project of the church, involved in an after-school program for children at the church.
