= Giuseppe Farinella =

Member of the Sicilian Mafia

- Giuseppe Farinella, Mafia boss of San Mauro Castelverde
- Born: 24 December 1925; San Mauro Castelverde, Sicily, Italy
- Died: 5 September 2017 (aged 91); Parma, Italy
- Occupation: Mafia Boss
- Status: Deceased (imprisoned from 1992)
- Allegiance: Corleonesi
- Conviction: Mafia association
- Penalty: Life imprisonment

Giuseppe Farinella (24 December 1925 – 5 September 2017) was a Sicilian mafioso, boss of the San Mauro Castelverde Mafia family and a one-time member of the Sicilian Mafia Commission.

San Mauro Castelverde, a village 1,000 metres above sea level in the Madonie mountain range in the province of Palermo, is the stronghold of the Farinella family. It is often used as a hideout for fugitive mafiosi. Giuseppe Farinella is the son of Mariano Farinella, already known as a criminal in the days of the Iron Prefect, Cesare Mori, appointed by Benito Mussolini to suppress the Mafia in the late 1920s.

For many years Giuseppe Don Peppino Farinella was the uncontested chieftain of the area. He became the "capo mandamento" of Gangi-San Mauro Castelverde area, and his influence reached into the province of Messina. He was a member of the Sicilian Mafia Commission since the late 1970s, according to the pentiti Salvatore Cancemi, Francesco Di Carlo and Giovanni Brusca. He was close to the Corleonesi, and supported them during the Second Mafia War, though due to San Mauro Castelverde's relative isolation, his Mafia faction did not have an active role in the war.

An old-fashioned mafia boss, Don Peppino did not allow his men to extort local shopkeepers, which was common among mafiosi from the countryside. Revenues were not considered worthwhile compared to the money that could be extorted from companies that won public tenders in construction. Moreover, by not extorting local shopkeepers Mafia bosses increased their legitimacy among the locals. "Don Peppino did not want his men to extort a pizzo from the shopkeepers, according to a victim, because the latter, in contrast to entrepreneurs, did not carry out any speculative activity and the because he … thought that asking shopkeepers for a tangente seemed like begging for alms."

Farinella was arrested on 21 March 1992. As a member of the Commission he was held responsible for the killing of the two prominent anti-mafia judges Paolo Borsellino and Giovanni Falcone, receiving life sentences. In January 1993, he was also sentenced to nine years in prison in the trial against the Mafia in Madonie area. He was considered to be the Mafia boss of the area.

He died on 5 September 2017 in prison in Parma.
