= Matranga =

Matranga is a surname. Notable people with the surname include:

- Antonino Matranga (1905–1971), member of the Cosa Nostra
- Luca Matranga, 16th century Arbëresh writer and priest
- Dave Matranga (born 1977), American baseball player
- David Matranga, American voice actor
- Jonah Matranga (born 1969), singer, songwriter, and guitarist

== See also ==
- New Orleans crime family § The Matranga Crime Family
