= Capizzi (surname) =

Capizzi is a surname. Notable people with the surname include:

- Benedetto Capizzi (1944–2023), Italian mobster
- Bill Capizzi (1937–2007), American voice actor
- Duane Capizzi, American writer and television producer
- Jason Capizzi (born 1983), American football player
