= Motisi Mafia clan =

- Matteo Motisi, Mafia boss from the Pagliarelli quarter in Palermo.
- Founded: 1936
- Founding location: Pagliarelli, Palermo, Sicily
- Years active: 1936–present
- Territory: Palermo
- Activities: extortion, drug trafficking
- Allies: Corleonesi (defunct)
- Rivals: Inzerillo Mafia clan Stefano Bontade

The Motisi Mafia clan (Italian: [moˈtiːzi], Sicilian: [mʊˈtiːsɪ]) is a historical Sicilian Mafia clan from the Pagliarelli area in Palermo. The Motisi clan is one of the oldest Mafia clans still active in Palermo, and a Motisi was mentioned in 1937 as the Mafia boss of Pagliarelli by Melchiorre Allegra, a mafioso physician who became an informant when he was arrested. Prior to that, Motisi had also been mentioned in the Sangiorgi report.

== Historical leaderships ==
- Lorenzo Motisi sat on the first Sicilian Mafia Commission for the Pagliarelli mandamento (Palermo).
- Ignazio Motisi sat on the Sicilian Mafia Commission at the end of the 1970s for the Pagliarelli mandamento (Palermo).
- Matteo Motisi (Palermo, 16 April 1918 – 5 September 2003) became a member of the Commission in 1983, as a result of the re-organization after the Second Mafia War. Previously, the Pagliarelli family had been part of the mandamento of Santa Maria di Gesù headed by Stefano Bontade. Matteo Motisi was an ally of the Corleonesi and received life sentences for the murders of anti-mafia judges Rocco Chinnici, Giovanni Falcone and Paolo Borsellino as well as for 22 murders of members of the Bontade and Inzerillo clans during the Second Mafia War in 1981-83.
- Giovanni Motisi (Palermo, 1 January 1959) succeeded his uncle Matteo Motisi as boss of the Pagliarelli family. He has been a fugitive since 1993 and is considered to be one of the more powerful bosses of Palermo. He is considered to be close to Bernardo Provenzano. Motisi is on the "Most wanted list" of the Italian Ministry of the Interior since 1998.
