= Antonio Salamone =

Member of the Sicilian Mafia

Arrest of Antonio Salamone in São Paulo in 1993

Antonio Salamone (12 December 1918 in San Giuseppe Jato – 31 May 1998 in São Paulo) was a member of the Sicilian Mafia and a member of the first Sicilian Mafia Commission. His nickname was “il furbo” – the cunning one.

== Mafia heritage ==
Salamone was born in San Giuseppe Jato in the Province of Palermo. After his first wife died, Salamone married Girolama Greco, a sister of Salvatore Greco "l'ingegnere", a cousin of Salvatore Greco "Ciaschiteddu", the boss of the Ciaculli Mafia family and the first secretary of the Sicilian Mafia Commission. His connection with the powerful Greco Mafia clan raised his standing in the Mafia.

After the Ciaculli massacre in 1963, he moved to São Paulo in Brazil, where he acquired citizenship in 1970. The illegal lottery operator (bicheiro) Castor de Andrade allegedly helped Salamone to settle in Brazil. Castor de Andrade gave him a cover job at Bangu Textiles, which he owned. Salamone became a naturalized Brazilian because of de Andrade’s influence.

== Running Pizza parlours in New York ==
In 1965, Salamone moved to New York and got involved in running pizza parlours with a member of his San Giuseppe Jato Mafia family, Giuseppe Ganci, who had moved to the United States.

He returned to Italy at the end of the 1960s. At the Trial of the 114 in 1968, Salamone was acquitted. In 1970, the Court of Palermo ordered a five-year internal exile in Sacile in the Friuli-Venezia Giulia region of north-east Italy. He was arrested again in 1971 for the second Trial of the 114, where he was acquitted in 1974.

== Disappeared? ==
After his acquittal in 1974, Salamone had to return to Sacile but disappeared without leaving a trace. He was considered to be a victim of a lupara bianca – a mafia-style murder in which the victim's body is deliberately hidden. In fact, Salamone had moved to São Paulo again where he became a building contractor.

He kept ruling the San Giuseppe Jato Mafia family. His substitute was Bernardo Brusca (the father of Giovanni Brusca) who also represented Salamone in the Sicilian Mafia Commission. Salamone counted on the powerful support of Stefano Bontade to curb his lieutenant Brusca’s desire for power.

== Second Mafia war ==
Salamone and Bontade wanted to kill Corleonesi-boss Totò Riina at a meeting of the Sicilian Mafia Commission during the escalating conflict with the established Mafia bosses in Palermo. However, the Corleonesi acted first and killed Bontade in April 1981, an event that set off the Second Mafia War.

In 1982 Salamone suddenly re-appeared again in public. He returned to Sacile, the town where he still had to serve the remainder of his internal exile. Salamone returned because he tried to avoid attempts by the Corleonesi of Totò Riina to use him to go after Tommaso Buscetta, considered to be one of the Corleonesi’s main enemies during the Second Mafia War. Salamone was a close friend of Buscetta and decided to give himself up to the police instead.

== Back in Italy ==
For many years law enforcement had believed Salamone to be dead, but his name reappeared in 1982 during police investigations into heroin trafficking and money laundering with Michele Zaza and the Cuntrera-Caruana Mafia clan. Salamone was part of the Sicilian supply ring for the so-called Pizza Connection. One of the main organisers in the United States was Giuseppe Ganci, a member of Salamone’s Mafia family.

In the following years, Salamone received arrest warrants for heroin trafficking and Mafia association. Sentenced to 22 years at the Maxi Trial in 1987, Salamone was sent home by the Supreme Court on the grounds of his “advanced age” and “grave state of health”, whereupon he promptly left the country to return to Brazil in 1989.

== Arrest in Brazil ==
On 16 April 1993, Salamone was arrested in São Paulo. However, because of his Brazilian nationality and his advanced age, he was not extradited to Italy. In June 1996, Antimafia prosecutor Gian Carlo Caselli, travelled from Palermo to Brazil to interrogate Salamone on the links of former Italian prime minister Giulio Andreotti with the Mafia. Salamone refused to answer any of the questions.

Salamone died of cancer on 31 May 1998, in São Paulo. Despite his involvement in 119 murders, Salamone was described as a frail, peaceable-looking old man during the Maxi Trial – he was “a mafioso with a human face” according to prosecutor Giuseppe Ayala.
