= Pino Puglisi =

Italian Roman Catholic priest (1937–1993)

Blessed Giuseppe Puglisi

Martyr
- Born: 15 September 1937; Brancaccio, Palermo, Kingdom of Italy
- Died: 15 September 1993 (aged 56); Brancaccio, Palermo, Italy
- Venerated in: Roman Catholic Church
- Beatified: 25 May 2013, Foro Italico 'Umberto I', Palermo by Cardinal Salvatore De Giorgi (on behalf of Pope Francis)
- Major shrine: Palermo Cathedral
- Feast: 21 October

Giuseppe "Pino" Puglisi (Italian: [ˈpiːno puʎˈʎiːzi], Sicilian: [pʊɟˈɟiːsɪ]; 15 September 1937 – 15 September 1993) was an Italian Roman Catholic priest who openly challenged the Sicilian Mafia controlling his Palermo neighbourhood of Brancaccio. The Mafia killed him on his 56th birthday. His life story has been retold in a book, Pino Puglisi, il prete che fece tremare la mafia con un sorriso (2013), and portrayed in a film, Come into the Light (Italian original title Alla luce del sole) in 2005. He was the first Mafia victim to be beatified by the Catholic Church.

== Ordained as priest ==
Puglisi was born in Brancaccio, a working-class neighbourhood in Palermo, Sicily, into a family of modest means. His father was a shoemaker and his mother a dressmaker. He entered the seminary at age sixteen. Following ordination, he worked in various parishes, including a country parish afflicted by a bloody vendetta.

Puglisi was ordained as a priest on 2 July 1960 by Cardinal Ernesto Ruffini from Palermo. Ruffini regarded communism as a greater threat than the Mafia. He once questioned the Mafia's very existence. To a journalist's question of "What is the Mafia?" he responded: "So far as I know, it could be a brand of detergent." This denial persuaded Puglisi of the need to challenge church authorities. "We can, we must criticize the church when we feel it doesn't respond to our expectations, because it's absolutely right to seek to improve it," he said. With his trademark humour, Puglisi added: "But we should always criticize it like a mother, never a mother-in-law!"

== Antimafia priest ==
In 1990, Puglisi returned to his old quarter Brancaccio and became the pastor of San Gaetano's Parish. He spoke out against the Mafia who controlled the area and opened a shelter for underprivileged children. Puglisi had been offered other parishes by the local curia, in less troublesome Palermo neighbourhoods, but he opted for San Gaetano.

With little support from the Palermo archdiocese, Puglisi tried to change his parishioners' mentality, which was conditioned by fear, passivity and word omertà (imposed silence). In his sermons, he pleaded to give leads to authorities about the Mafia's illicit activities in Brancaccio, even if they could not actually name names. He refused their monies when offered for the traditional feast day celebrations, and would not allow the Mafia "men of honour" to march at the head of religious processions.

He tried to discourage the children from dropping out of school, robbing, drug dealing and selling contraband cigarettes. He ignored a series of warnings and declined to award a contract to a construction firm which had been "indicated" to him by the Mafia for the restoration of the church, where the roof was collapsing. Those parishioners who made attempts to reform matters were sent strong messages. A small group who organized for social improvement found the doors of their houses torched, their phones receiving threats, and their families put on notice that worse things lay in store.

== Death ==
On 15 September 1993 – Puglisi's 56th birthday – he was killed outside his home by a single bullet shot at point-blank range. He was taken unconscious to a local hospital, where surgeons could not revive him. The murder was ordered by the local Mafia bosses, the brothers Filippo and Giuseppe Graviano. One of the hitmen who killed Puglisi, Salvatore Grigoli, later confessed and revealed the priest's last words as his killers approached: "I've been expecting you."

Puglisi's murder shocked Italy. There was an immediate call by eight priests in Palermo for the pope to travel to Palermo to be present at his funeral. Pope John Paul II, however, was scheduled to be in Tuscany on that date and did not attend the memorial service. At the funeral Mass the archbishop of Palermo, Cardinal Salvatore Pappalardo, spoke out very strongly against the Mafia, echoing the Pope's words on a visit to Agrigento, Sicily, just months earlier.

On 14 April 1998, the Mafiosi Gaspare Spatuzza, Nino Mangano, Cosimo Lo Nigro and Luigi Giacalone received life sentences for the killing of Puglisi. The Graviano brothers also received life sentences for ordering the killing.

== Legacy ==
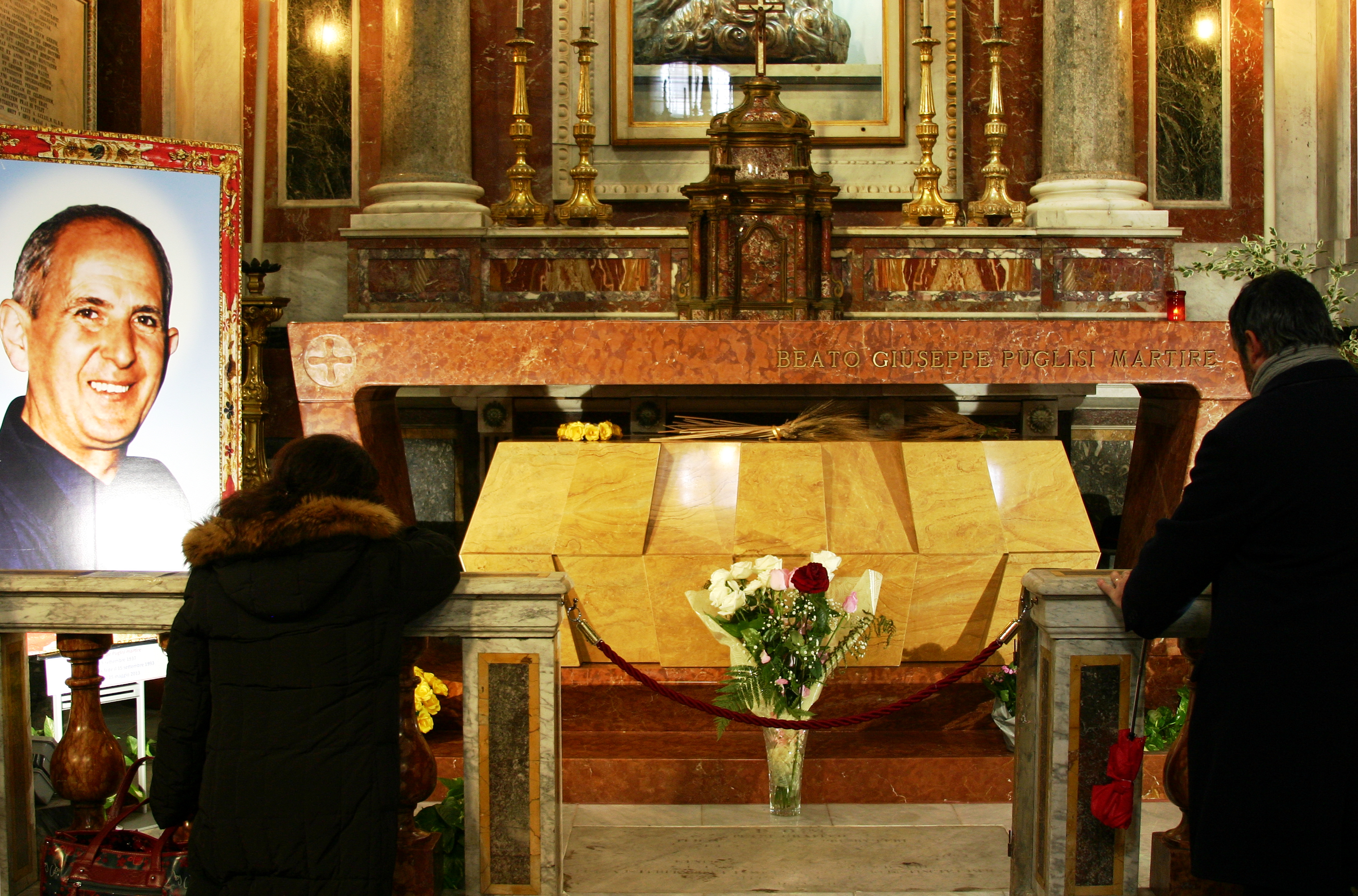
Tomb of Pino Puglisi at the Cathedral of Palermo.

During his visit to Sicily in November 1994, Pope John Paul II praised Puglisi as a "courageous exponent of the Gospel." He urged Sicilians not to allow the priest’s death to have been in vain and warned that silence and passivity about the Mafia was tantamount to complicity.

Puglisi's favorite rhetorical stance – "Se ognuno fa qualcosa, allora si può fare molto" (If everyone does something, then we can do a lot) – is scrawled on walls in Brancaccio.

To underscore his anti-Mafia conviction, Puglisi had composed a parody of the Our Father in the Sicilian language:

O godfather to me and my family, You are a man of honour and worth. Your name must be respected. Everyone must obey you. Everyone must do what you say for this is the law of those who do not wish to die. You give us bread, work; who wrongs you, pays. Do not pardon; it is an infamy. Those who speak are spies. I put my trust in you, godfather. Free me from the police and the law.

== Beatification ==
In 1999, the Cardinal of Palermo started Puglisi's beatification process, proclaiming him a Servant of God.

On 28 June 2012, Pope Benedict XVI allowed the Vatican Congregation for the Causes of Saints to designate Puglisi a martyr in a first step to beatify the slain priest. The Pope signed a decree acknowledging that Father Puglisi had been killed "in hatred of the faith", meaning that he can be beatified – the last step before sainthood – without a miracle being attributed to his intercession with God.

The beatification of Pino Puglisi took place on 25 May 2013. The open-air Mass took place at the Foro Italico 'Umberto I', a large green area that forms one of the promenades of Palermo. The Mass was presided over by Cardinal Paolo Romeo, Metropolitan Archbishop of Palermo, with Cardinal Salvatore De Giorgi, Metropolitan Archbishop Emeritus of Palermo, as the papal legate who performed the rite of beatification. Estimates state that 50,000 people attended the Mass. During his Angelus address, the following Sunday, 26 May, Pope Francis stated that the newly beatified Puglisi was first and foremost "an exemplary priest and a martyr", as well as condemning mafia groups.

== Biography and film ==
- Deliziosi, Francesco (2001). Don Puglisi: Vita del prete palermitano ucciso dalla mafia, Milan: Mondadori, ISBN 88-04-55377-4
- Deliziosi, Francesco (2013). Pino Puglisi, il prete che fece tremare la mafia con un sorriso, Milan: Rizzoli, ISBN 978-8817066587
- Come into the Light, also known as In the Sunlight, is a film about the life of Puglisi, by Roberto Faenza and starring Luca Zingaretti, was released in Italy in 2005.

== See also ==
- List of victims of the Sicilian Mafia
- Streetwise priest
