= Gaetano Fidanzati =

Mafia boss

- Mugshot of Fidanzati
- Born: 6 September 1935; Palermo, Sicily, Italy
- Died: 5 October 2013 (aged 78); Milan, Italy
- Known for: Mafia boss and drug trafficker
- Allegiance: Resuttana Mafia family / Sicilian Mafia

Gaetano Fidanzati (Italian pronunciation: [ɡaeˈtaːno fidanˈtsaːti]; 6 September 1935 – 5 October 2013) was a Sicilian Mafia boss of the Resuttana mandamento in Palermo and heavily involved in drug trafficking. He was among the first Mafia bosses to establish a presence in Northern Italy, in particular Milan, and was the protagonist of the alliances between the Sicilian Cosa Nostra, the American Cosa Nostra, the Neapolitan Camorra and the Colombian drug cartels.

Gaetano Fidanzati was on the Italian Ministry of the Interior's most wanted list from 2008 until his arrest on 5 December 2009.

== Drug trafficking ==
Fidanzati and his four brothers hailed from Palermo's Arenella neighbourhood. They formed a Mafia clan, said to be among the most heavily involved in international drug trafficking. The Fidanzati Mafia family belongs to the aristocracy of the Palermo mafia which, however, was not affected by the Corleonesi, but rather came to terms with it.

He reportedly innovated the practice of exchanging heroin for cocaine to avoid money trails. The exchange rate with the American Mafia – particularly the Gambinos – was one kilogram of heroin for three kilograms of cocaine.

== In Milan ==
In the 1960s, the clan moved north to Milan and allied with Mafia boss Gerlando Alberti's gang. The Fidanzati mafia family was one of the oldest and most powerful, if not the most powerful, Cosa Nostra families based in Lombardy.

In 1968, Fidanzatti, along with most of 113 other alleged top Mafia members, was acquitted of multiple charges at 1960s Sicilian Mafia trials#The Trial of the 114. He was internally banished and was moved to Naples, where he met Michele Zaza of the Camorra, with whom he arranged to smuggle cigarettes and, later, heroin.

In 1987, at the Maxi Trial against the Mafia in Palermo, Fidanzati was sentenced to twelve years in prison for drug trafficking but was soon free on a procedural technicality and fled.

The pentito (turncoat) Gaspare Mutolo recalled Fidanzati approaching him during the Maxi Trial in 1986, asking if he could find more Thai heroin and proposing "we'll send it to Canada, to Cuntrera and Caruana, everything you want, either 100 or 200 kilos, every amount you can send them in Canada because they control everything over there."

== Arrest and extradition ==
On 22 February 1990, Fidanzati was arrested in Buenos Aires and extradited to Italy in April 1993. Over the next years, he was in and out of prison on drug trafficking charges.

In December 2008, after a nine-month investigation dubbed "Operation Perseus" (after the Greek mythological hero who beheaded Medusa), police indicted 94 Mafiosi, including Fidanzati, to prevent them from reconstituting a new governing board for the Mafia, known as the Sicilian Mafia Commission. At the time, he was released from prison on health grounds and serving his sentence under house arrest. As head of the Resuttana mandamento, he would have been a member of the Commission.

Milan Flying Squad chief Alessandro Giuliano (son of Boris) arrested Fidanzati in the city on 5 December 2009.

== Death ==
On 5 October 2013, Fidanzati died at age 78. The cause of death has not been disclosed.

== Books ==
- Sterling, Claire (1990). Octopus. How the long reach of the Sicilian Mafia controls the global narcotics trade, New York: Simon & Schuster, ISBN 0-671-73402-4
