= Leonardo Vitale =

Member of the Sicilian Mafia

- Born: 27 June 1941; Palermo, Sicily, Italy
- Died: 2 December 1984 (aged 43); Palermo, Sicily, Italy
- Cause of death: Gunshot
- Occupation: Mobster
- Allegiance: Altarello di Baida Mafia family

Leonardo Vitale (Italian pronunciation: [leoˈnardo viˈtaːle]; 27 June 1941 – 2 December 1984) was a member of the Sicilian Mafia who was one of the first to become an informant, or pentito, although originally his confessions were not taken seriously. Vitale was a "man of honour" or member of the Altarello di Baida cosca or family, Altarello being a neighborhood in the western area of Palermo.

== Background ==
In 1960, at the age of 19, Vitale was affiliated with the Mafia family of Altarello, which was led by his uncle Giovanbattista "Titta". Vitale carried out extortions of construction companies on the orders of his uncle and his associate Giuseppe Calò, later being promoted to capodecina. In 1972, Vitale was arrested on suspicion of being implicated in the kidnapping of the manufacturer Luciano Cassina but was released after a week of isolation in the prison of Asinara. Whilst held in custody, he showed signs of depression that led to coprophagia and practised self-mutilation as his own act of contrition; doctors subjected him to electroconvulsive therapy.

On 29 March 1973, Vitale walked into a Palermo police station and declared that he was a member of the Mafia and confessed to various acts of extortion, arson and two homicides. In front of police officers he explained how a Mafia family is organised and revealed the existence of the Sicilian Mafia Commission, more than a decade before Tommaso Buscetta exposed Mafia secrets to judges who were prepared to listen. In explaining why he had turned himself in, something that was unheard of from a mafioso at that point, Vitale claimed to have had a spiritual crisis and wanted to unburden himself.

In 1977, Vitale's testimony led to 28 defendants being indicted, all of whom were acquitted due to lack of evidence and the doubt surrounding Vitale's mental state by pointing out his erratic behaviour, except for himself and his uncle who were imprisoned. While testifying against his fellow Mafiosi, Vitale reminisced about his life: "I have made a fool of my life, by the evil that has rained on me from the time I was a child... My sin was having been born into a Mafia family and of having lived in a society where everyone is a Mafioso and are respected for it; while those who are not are treated with contempt." Vitale spent most of his time in a mental asylum, before being released in June 1984.

On 2 December 1984, he was shot dead as he left a church after attending Mass with his mother and sister.

== Legacy ==
Later in 1984, Tommaso Buscetta became an informant and gave a vast amount of information on the Mafia in Sicily that subsequently backed up a lot of Vitale's own testimony.

Vitale's original written testimony was used in the Maxi Trial several years later, where Magistrate Giovanni Falcone declared that "it is to be hoped that at least after his death Vitale will get the credence he deserved." According to Falcone, the Mafia understood the importance of Vitale's revelations much better than the Italian justice system at the time and killed him when the moment was most opportune.
