= Raffaele Ganci =

Member of the Sicilian Mafia (1932–2022)

Raffaele Ganci (4 January 1932 – 3 June 2022) was a member of the Mafia in Sicily from the Noce neighbourhood in Palermo. He was considered to be the right-hand man of Cosa Nostra boss Totò Riina and sat on the Sicilian Mafia Commission.

== Riina loyalist ==
Ganci was close to the Corleonesi circle of which Riina was a member and sided with them against other Palermitan Mafia families in the Second Mafia War. He was held responsible for the killings of Riina's rivals Stefano Bontade and Salvatore Inzerillo in 1981. He was sentenced to life for the killing of general Carlo Alberto Dalla Chiesa, the prefect of Palermo, appointed to crack down on Cosa Nostra in 1982.

Riina appointed him to the Sicilian Mafia Commission in 1983 for the Noce mandamento after Ganci killed his own boss Salvatore Scaglione. As a member of the Commission he was responsible for ordering the killings of Antimafia magistrates Giovanni Falcone and Paolo Borsellino in 1992.

== Butcher shop ==
The family ran a popular butcher shop on the Via Lo Jacono. During the day Raffaele Ganci and his sons Calogero, Stefano, and Domenico attended clients, while they went on killing sprees at night. The shop was located somewhere between the residences of Antimafia judges Rocco Chinnici on the Via Pipitone Federico and the one of Giovanni Falcone. The wives of the judges regularly bought meat there, while the Gancis plotted the killing of their husbands.

On 10 June 1993, Raffaele Ganci was arrested in Terrasini after five years on the run, together with his son Calogero Ganci and his son-in-law Francesco Paolo Anselmo.

== Son repents ==
His son Calogero Ganci, a pentito, became a witness for the prosecution, in 1996, and confessed to more than 100 murders. He also gave testimony about his father and his brothers and their involvement in Mafia killings such as the car-bomb that killed Antimafia judge Chinnici in 1983, police officers Ninni Cassarà, captain D'Aleo, and the first pentito, Leonardo Vitale.

Raffaele Ganci was involved in the decision to kill the Antimafia judges Giovanni Falcone and Paolo Borsellino, and he and his sons participated in the execution of the bomb attacks. Ganci had doubts about the terrorist campaign in 1993, a series of bomb attacks in 1993 on the Via dei Georgofili in Florence, on the Via Palestro in Milan and at the Piazza San Giovanni in Laterano and the Via San Teodoro in Rome, which left 10 people dead and 93 injured as well as damage to centres of cultural heritage such as the Uffizi Gallery. According to his son Calogero: "My father told me that Cosa Nostra was ruined by the massacres decided by Riina."

In 2002, Ganci was sentenced to life imprisonment for his role in the murder of Chinnici.

He was incarcerated serving several life sentences under the strict article 41-bis prison regime.

Raffaele Ganci died in Milan on 3 June 2022 at the age of 90.

== Books ==
- Paoli, Letizia (2003). Mafia Brotherhoods: Organized Crime, Italian Style, New York: Oxford University Press ISBN 0-19-515724-9 (Review)
