= Pagliarelli Prison =

Prison in Palermo, Italy

Pagliarelli
- Location: Palermo, Sicily, Italy
- Capacity: 1166
- Population: 1489 (31 August 2026)
- Opened: 1996
- Managed by: Department of Prison Administration
- Governor: Maria Luisa Malato

The Pagliarelli Prison, officially the casa circondariale "Antonio Lorusso", is a prison in the Pagliarelli neighbourhood of Palermo, Sicily, Italy.

== History ==
Pagliarelli was built in 1980, became operational in 1996 and it is adjacent and adjoined to the Tribunal of Palermo. The prison is situated behind the mountain ranges of Madonie and is a very large structure of reinforced concrete (RC), for both men and women, in the chief town of the island.

Pagliarelli is divided into 8 departments: Scirocco (Maestrale and Libeccio), South (or “Mari”: Tirreno, Adriatico and Ionio), and Est (or “Pianeti”: Marte, Plutone and Giove) with a total of almost one thousand inmates. Some rules of the institute seem to be very punitive as regards improper and prohibited behaviours.

In June 2015, an Albanian was discovered (and filmed by cameras) just in time during a jailbreak, and just after was killed by the owner of the house he was robbing.

== The prison today ==
Pagliarelli is a maximum security prison holding prisoners from all over Italy. Moreover, Pagliarelli is a local prison, accepting different categories of prisoners and from different countries, especially from Romania and Tunisia. In addition the establishment serves the Tribunal, the Judiciary of Surveillance (Ufficio di Sorveglianza) and UEPE. Accommodation at the prison is a mixture of approximately 70% multi-occupancy cells and 30% single cells, distributed mainly across 3 residential units.

Inmates at Pagliarelli are offered access to education, workshops and two gyms, with one focusing on physical education courses.

== Capacity and overcrowding ==
The Department of Prison Administration of the Italian Ministry of Justice gives the prison a regulatory capacity of 1,166 places. On 31 August 2026 it held 1,489 inmates, among them 111 women and 185 foreign nationals. Regulatory capacity is calculated on a standard of 9 square metres for the first occupant of a cell and 5 square metres for each of the others, a more generous standard than the 6 plus 4 square metres used by the Committee for the Prevention of Torture, and it does not take account of places temporarily out of use.

Pino Apprendi, the prisoners' ombudsman for the city of Palermo, said in July 2026 that the prison then held 1,406 inmates against 1,147 places, and that overcrowding was compounded by summer heat, by a rule barring fans from the cells, and by a shortage of prison officers.
