= Corrado Carnevale =

Italian judge (1930–2026)

- Born: 9 March 1930; Licata, Italy
- Died: 4 February 2026 (aged 95); Rome, Italy
- Other names: "L'ammazzasentenze" (the Sentence-slayer)
- Education: University of Palermo
- Occupations: Magistrate, judge

Corrado Carnevale (9 March 1930 – 4 February 2026) was an Italian judge who served as the president of the Italian Supreme Court of Cassation.

== Life and career ==
Born in Licata, Sicily in 1930, he graduated "cum laude" from the University of Palermo at the age of 21 and came first in the competitive exam for a post of uditore Giudiziario, which he took up on 17 December 1953. At the age of 55, he became the youngest ever president of the Supreme Court of Cassation.

Carnevale was nicknamed l'ammazzasentenze (the sentence-slayer) because of the many convictions of Mafiosi he overturned on appeal. During the Maxi Trial in the mid 1980s, Carnevale was the president of the first criminal section of the Court of Cassation, however because he was suspected of colluding with the Mafia, he was not appointed the judge for the final decision on the Maxi Trial by the Supreme Court, as he was replaced by judge Arnaldo Valente.

He was suspended from his magisterial duties in March 1993. On 29 June 2001, he was sentenced to six years' imprisonment for external complicity in a mafia association, providing a conscious, voluntary, concrete contribution that helps the organization pursue its criminal purposes. However, he was acquitted by the Supreme Court of Cassation on 30 October 2002.

A provision of the law of 30 July 2007 n. 111 (approved in the Prodi II government) provided that those who had been reinstated could not take top positions beyond 75 years; instead, this rule was repealed in October 2008. From 21 June 2007, Carnevale returned to carry out the judicial activity at the First Civil Section of the Cassation, even if no longer as President; he also had to abandon his candidacy as First President of the Supreme Court. Carnevale was expected to remain in service until 2015, but finally decided to retire on 9 December 2013.

Carnevale died on 4 February 2026, at the age of 95.
