= Antonino Matranga =

Member of the Sicilian Mafia (1905–1971)

- Born: 25 March 1905; Palermo, Sicily, Kingdom of Italy
- Died: 30 April 1971 (aged 66); Milan, Lombardy, Italy
- Cause of death: Gunshots
- Allegiance: Resuttana Mafia family / Cosa Nostra

Antonio "Antonino" Matranga (25 March 1905 – 30 April 1971) was a member of the Sicilian Mafia. He was the boss of the Mafia family of the Resuttana Colli neighbourhood in Palermo and sat on the first Sicilian Mafia Commission.

== Biography ==
Matranga was a wealthy landowner who became enriched through proceeds derived from real estate speculation and initially belonged to the San Lorenzo Colli Mafia family. He sat on the first Sicilian Mafia Commission for the Resuttana mandamento.

He was part of a syndicate, together with Pietro Davì, Rosario Mancino, Antonino Sorci and Mariano Troia, involved in heroin trafficking to the United States, purchasing the heroin in France, North Africa and the Middle East, with financial backing from leading figures in the Palermo Mafia, including the La Barbera brothers, Salvatore Greco "Ciaschiteddu" and Salvatore "The Engineer" Greco. A botched heroin deal and the subsequent killing of Calcedonio Di Pisa on December 26, 1962, who was held responsible, triggered the First Mafia War, which was initially taken to be a conflict between the La Barbera brothers and Pietro Torretta against a rival group headed by the Greco's.

Although it look liked he remained on the sidelines, Matranga belonged to a secret third group around Michele Cavataio, together with Mariano Troia and Salvatore Manno, other members of the Commission. They opposed a proposal of the La Barbera's to restucture the Commission that would have significantly undermined their position. The proposal required that Commission delegates be separate from family bosses — specifically, that each family's Commission representative should be a junior member chosen by the boss, rather than the boss himself. This was a direct challenge to Cavataio and his allies, who each simultaneously held both roles.

The group tried to manipulate the conflict for their own purposes, a plot that was only uncovered much later. Cavataio staged the killing of Di Pisa and was behind the bomb attack on 30 June 1963 in Ciaculli in Greco's area, that killed seven police and military officers. The Ciaculli massacre shifted the Mafia war into a war against the Mafia, which in turn prompted the first concerted anti-mafia efforts by the state in post-war Italy. Within a period of ten weeks, 1,200 mafiosi were arrested. The Commission was dissolved, while Matranga and Troia had left Palermo and had moved to Milan, where they went into hiding.

During the Trial of the 114 related to the First Mafia War in Catanzaro in 1968, he was acquitted due to lack of evidence; Antonino Matranga was assassinated in Milan on 29 April 1971, in Via Boncompagni, by hitmen of the Mafia, for his role in the First Mafia War. Years later, Francesco Madonia, became the head of the Resuttana mandamento.

== Sources ==
- Abbate + 706: Tribunale di Palermo, Ufficio Istruzione Processi Penali (N. 22S9/82 R.G.U.I.), 8 November 1984. Ordinanza-Sentenza emessa nel procedimento penale contro Abbate Giovanni + 706. In: Il Maxiprocesso di Palermo, Commissione parlamentare di inchiesta sul fenomeno delle mafie e sulle altre associazioni criminali, anche straniere, XIX legislatura, Doc. XXIII, n. 9, 20 May 2025
- Lodato, Saverio (1999). La mafia ha vinto: Tommaso Buscetta intervista di Saverio Lodato. Frecce. Milano: Mondadori. ISBN 978-88-04-47460-9.
- Shawcross, Tim; Young, Martin (1987). Men of honour: the confessions of Tommaso Buscetta (1. publ ed.). London: Collins. ISBN 978-0-00-217589-0.
