= Francesco Madonia =

Sicilian mafioso (1924–2007)

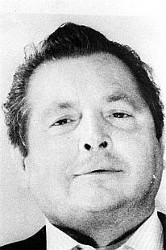
- Francesco Ciccio Madonia
- Born: 31 March 1924; Palermo, Sicily, Kingdom of Italy
- Died: 13 March 2007 (aged 82); Naples, Campania, Italy
- Other name: Ciccio Madonia
- Occupation: Mafia boss
- Known for: Head of the Resuttana Mafia family
- Children: 4
- Status: Deceased (imprisoned from 1987)
- Allegiance: Resuttana Mafia Family / Sicilian mafia
- Criminal charges: Multiple murder Mafia association
- Penalty: 13 terms of life imprisonment

Francesco "Ciccio" Madonia (Italian pronunciation: [franˈtʃesko ˈtʃittʃo madoˈniːa]; 31 March 1924 – 13 March 2007) was a Sicilian mafioso from Palermo, boss of the Resuttana Mafia family, which at the time also encompassed the San Lorenzo-Pallavicino area. In 1978 he became a member of the Sicilian Mafia Commission as head of the Resuttana mandamento.

Madonia became the unquestioned patriarch of the Resuttana Mafia family, having replaced Antonino Matranga, murdered in 1971. In 1978 he came to head the Resuttana mandamento after the territory, on Totò Riina's request, was taken out of the jurisdiction of Rosario Riccobono and made independent. Already one of Riina's closest allies in all of Sicily, he and the Resuttana family he led strongly supported the Corleonesi during the Second Mafia War in 1981–84. Ciccio Madonia's two sons, Nino and Salvuccio, took part in many murders and massacres during the war. In 1987, at the Maxi Trial, he was sentenced to life for murder, but he went on running the Family from prison; first through his sons Antonino, Giuseppe and Salvatore Salvino Madonia, all three jailed, after that through his brother Diego, the reputed acting boss.

== Life sentences ==
Ciccio Madonia was involved in several of the most bloody events in the 1980s. He actively cooperated in the elimination of the old Palermitan bosses of the Second Mafia War, such as Stefano Bontade and Salvatore Inzerillo. He has also been involved in the murders of Piersanti Mattarella, the Christian Democrat president of the autonomous region of Sicily in 1980; general Carlo Alberto Dalla Chiesa, the prefect of Palermo in 1982; police chief Ninni Cassarà in 1985; and Libero Grassi, the Palermitan businessman who was killed by the Mafia after refusing to pay extortion money, known as "pizzo". Francesco Madonia was involved in the failed bomb attack against Antimafia judge Giovanni Falcone at Addaura in 1989 (which is in the Resuttana mandamento) and the killings of Falcone and his colleague Paolo Borsellino in 1992.

He was arrested in 1987 together with his son Giuseppe Madonia. However, despite his life sentence at the Maxi Trial, the most important Mafia bosses of the Commission spent months at a time not at Ucciardone prison, but in hotel-like conditions of Palermo's Ospedale Civico (Civic Hospital). The director of the hospital was Giuseppe Lima, the brother of Salvo Lima, a member of parliament suspected of mafia ties.

In 1989, the police discovered the hideout of Francesco's son Nino Madonia which contained an account book of the family's extortion business which listed some 150 businessmen. The ledger included the names of car dealers, drugstores, restaurants, and small factories that were lined up next to the amounts of their pizzo – from about US$150 to US$7,000 a month. None of the more than 150 businessmen on the list would help identify the extortionists.

Francesco Madonia has been convicted for ordering the killing of Libero Grassi in 1991, the Palermo businessman who refused to pay protection money (the so-called pizzo) and went on national television to denounce the practice. Grassi's business was in the area that is controlled by the Madonia clan. His son Salvatore Salvino Madonia was the killer.

On 14 November 1992, Madonia and Salvatore Riina were sentenced to life imprisonment for the murder of Emanuele Basile.

In 2002, Madonia was sentenced to life imprisonment for his role in the murder of judge Rocco Chinnici.

== Death ==
He died on 13 March 2007, in a prison hospital in Naples where he was serving his life sentence under the severe conditions of the article 41-bis prison regime.

== Family ==
In November 2008, Italian police arrested five people, including Maria Angela Di Trapani, the wife of jailed Sicilian Mafia boss Antonino Madonia, and seized assets worth 15 million euros that anti-Mafia investigators believe belong to the Madonias. The assets include farmland and farm buildings, villas, apartments and businesses in Sicily.

Madonia's jailed sons, Antonino, Giuseppe and Salvatore are all in high-security detention under the harsh 41-bis prison regime for Mafia prisoners that is meant to severely restrict their contact with other prisoners and the outside world. Nevertheless, they have continued to run the Madonia clan, issuing orders via Di Trapani and exchanging information with the Di Trapani clan, according to investigators.
