= Brancaccio =

Neighbourhood in Palermo, Italy

Brancaccio-Ciaculli
- Quartiere of Palermo
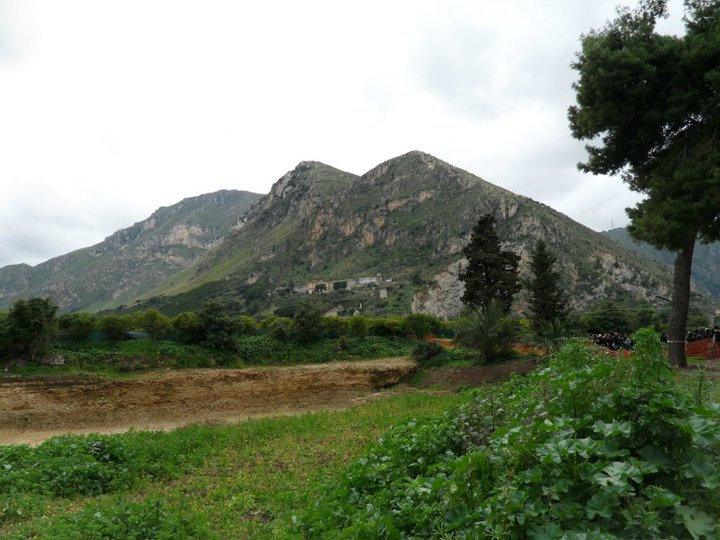
- Mount Griffith from Brancaccio

- Position of the quartiere within the city of Palermo
- Coordinates: 38°05′53″N 13°22′53″E
- Country: Italy
- Region: Sicily
- Province: Metropolitan City of Palermo
- Comune: Palermo

Area
  - Total: 5.00 sq mi (12.95 km^{2})

Population
  - Total: 16,819
  - Density: 3,363.8/sq mi (1,298.78/km^{2})
- Time zone: UTC+1 (CET)
  - Summer (DST): UTC+2 (CEST)
- CAP: 90124
- Area code: 091

Brancaccio is the 12th district of Palermo, in Sicily, Italy. It is located in the south-eastern outskirts of the city and is included in the 2nd municipal division.

The area of the district appears today as densely urbanized, despite the fact that in the past it was a particularly flourishing countryside due to the numerous underground waterways.

From the 13th century, the vast suburban area where the current district arose was generally called "Contrada Cassarorum". In the 17th century, the aristocracy chose this countryside area for the establishment of resorts. The residential settlements built after World War II have occupied a significant part of the countryside.

Brancaccio became known in contemporary times for the murder of Father Pino Puglisi, local parish priest and Antimafia activist who spoke out against Cosa Nostra (the Sicilian Mafia) and attempted to save numerous young persons from being recruited by the clans. He was killed on 15 September 1993 on the order of the local Mafia bosses, the brothers Filippo and Giuseppe Graviano.

== Toponimy ==
The district takes its name from Antonio Brancaccio, a nobleman of Neapolitan origins who in the 17th century became the governor of Monreale, a town (or comune) on the southern border of Palermo. He owned large plots of land in the area of the current district and built the Church of Saint Anna in 1747, which later became the Church of Saint Gaetano.
