= Mario Prestifilippo =

Member of the Sicilian Mafia

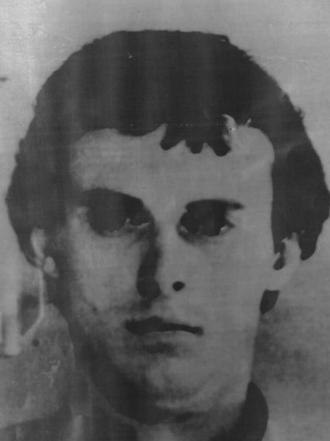
Mario Prestifilippo

Mario Prestifilippo (Italian pronunciation: [ˈmaːrjo prestifiˈlippo] 7 December 1958 – 29 September 1987) was a member of the Sicilian Mafia.

He was briefly the boss of the Ciaculli Mafia Family after Giuseppe Greco was murdered in 1985. He played a significant role as a hitman in the Second Mafia War of the early 1980s orchestrated by Salvatore Riina. He was supposedly under the orders of Michele Greco but Greco was himself regarded as little more than a puppet of Riina. He was a member of the death squad of the Corleonesi clan that was commanded by Greco and took part in many significant murders during the war from 1981–1982 including the Circonvallazione massacre on 16 June 1982.

Prestifilippo was shot to death by two killers armed with a shotgun and an AK-47 as he sped through the streets of Bagheria on 29 September 1987 on a motorbike, moving from one hiding place to another. He was killed because he protested against the execution of Pino Greco, who was a close friend of his. At the time of his death, he was a fugitive, suspected of dozens of murders, and was being tried in absentia at the Maxi Trial.
