= Rosario Riccobono =

Mafia boss (1929–1982)

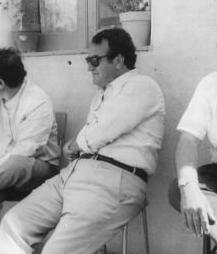
- Born: 10 February 1929; Palermo, Sicily, Kingdom of Italy
- Died: 30 November 1982 (aged 53); Palermo, Sicily, Italy
- Known for: Mafia boss and drug trafficker
- Allegiance: Partanna-Mondello Mafia family / Sicilian Mafia

Rosario Riccobono (10 February 1929 in Palermo – 30 November 1982 in Palermo) was a member of the Sicilian Mafia. He was the boss of Partanna Mondello, a suburb of Palermo, his native city.

In 1974 he became a member of the Sicilian Mafia Commission, representing the Partanna mandamento. During the 1970s Riccobono was one of the most influential members of the Commission, and the Cosa Nostra's king of drug trafficking.

== Heroin trafficker ==
He was involved in heroin trafficking throughout the 1970s and went on the run at the end of that decade after he came under suspicion of running an operation to smuggle heroin from Turkey through Sicily and on to the United States. His right-hand man was the future pentito Gaspare Mutolo, who organized massive shipments of heroin.

At one point, in the early 1980s, he was negotiating 500-kilogramme shipments of heroin from Thailand together with Nitto Santapaola, capo of the Catania Mafia family.

== Second Mafia war ==
As capo mandamento he became a member of the Commission, the coordinating body of Cosa Nostra in Sicily, in 1974. He was initially close to other important heroin traffickers such as Stefano Bontade, Salvatore Inzerillo and Gaetano Badalamenti who opposed the rising power of Salvatore Riina and his Corleonesi. He tried to keep a neutral position, but became more and more isolated, trusting his alliance with the head of the Commission Michele Greco, who, however, secretly sided with the Corleonesi.

During the Second Mafia War that broke out in 1981 with the murder of Bontade and Inzerillo, Riccobono expediently sided with the Corleonesi. He lured a number of friends of Stefano Bontade and Salvatore Inzerillo to their deaths on behalf of Riina. Those that went along, such as Inzerillo's brother and Emanuele D’Agostino, were never seen again. One of the men he tried to ensnare was Salvatore Contorno, but Contorno was suspicious and fled into hiding. He subsequently went on to become a pentito, cooperating with the government.

== Killed by the Corleonesi ==
However, turning against his former allies made Riccobono an untrustworthy man and Riina decided to turn against him after he had taken care of Bontade and Inzerillo. Unlike with other Mafia families, Riina had never succeeded in infiltrating the Mafia family of Riccobono with men loyal to the Corleonesi. Riina was not able to control Riccobono and needed the charismatic boss out of the way, not in the least to reward his other allies in Palermo with parts of Riccobono’s territory.

Riccobono and eight of his men vanished without a trace at the end of November 1982. The men were separated from each other at a dinner at Michele Greco’s estate and strangled one by one by their table companions. Riccobono was just taking his after-dinner nap. Three of his associates were gunned down a few days later and his brother, Vito Riccobono, was found decapitated in his car. Within a few days, Riccobono’s entourage was eliminated. One of the few who survived was Riccobono’s erstwhile driver Salvatore Lo Piccolo, who rose to power twenty years later.

For a while, the Italian media blamed another foe of Riina, Tommaso Buscetta, as being responsible for wiping out the Riccobono cosca, as revenge for the recent slayings of Buscetta's two sons. In fact, Buscetta had nothing to do with the killing of Riccobono and his men; he was hiding out in Brazil at the time. A number of informants have said that Pino Greco was the man who personally garrotted Riccobono and subsequently orchestrated the murders of a dozen of Riccobono's associates and relatives.

Rosario Riccobono was given an in absentia life sentence at the Maxi Trial in 1987 even though he was dead by then. Rumours of his death emerged in the mid-1980s but were not confirmed until the end of that decade through the informant Francesco Marino Mannoia. His body has never been found.

== Caravaggio ==
At one point, Riccobono was believed to have been in the possession of Caravaggio's Nativity with St. Francis and St. Lawrence, one of the most famous stolen pieces of artwork.

== References and external links ==
- Paoli, Letizia (2003). Mafia Brotherhoods: Organized Crime, Italian Style, Oxford/New York: Oxford University Press ISBN 0-19-515724-9
- Stille, Alexander (1995). Excellent Cadavers. The Mafia and the Death of the First Italian Republic, New York: Vintage ISBN 0-09-959491-9
