= San Giuseppe Jato =

- Comune
- Comune di San Giuseppe Jato

- Coat of arms

- Location within Italy Location within Sicily
- Coordinates: 37°58′N 13°11′E
- Country: Italy
- Region: Sicily
- Metropolitan city: Palermo (PA)

Government
  - Mayor: Giuseppe Cosmo Siviglia

Area
  - Total: 29 km^{2} (11 sq mi)
- Elevation: 463 m (1,519 ft)

Population (2004)
  - Total: 8,349
  - Density: 290/km^{2} (750/sq mi)
- Demonym: Jatini
- Time zone: UTC+1 (CET)
  - Summer (DST): UTC+2 (CEST)
- Postal code: 90048
- Dialing code: 091
- Patron saint: Maria SS. della Provvidenza
- Saint day: August 13-August 16

San Giuseppe Jato (Sicilian: San Giuseppi; Latin: Iaetia) is a village in the Metropolitan City of Palermo in Sicily, southern Italy.

The village sits in a hilly region of Palermo's hinterland, 31 kilometres (19 mi) from the Sicilian capital.

== History ==
The first inhabited centre in the area lies on top of the adjacent Mount Jato, dating back to prehistoric times, with influence of Greek culture from the 6th century BC. Known under the name of Iaitas in Greek sources and Ietas in Latin, this ancient village lived its most flourishing period in its history from the age of Islamic domination of Sicily to the Hohenstaufen one (c. 975–1246), when it was an important stronghold. It is believed that the last remnants of the original Muslim stronghold were demolished in 1246 by the troops of Frederick II of Sicily.

The modern village was founded in 1779 at the foot of Mount Jato. It was known simply as San Giuseppe, until 1864 when the suffix Jato was added to differentiate it from San Giuseppe Vesuviano, near Naples.

San Giuseppe Jato is the birthplace of Giovanni Brusca, a notorious mafioso who, in 1996, was arrested for the assassination of Judge Giovanni Falcone, a prominent Sicilian anti-mafia campaigner.

== Economy ==
Like many villages and towns in the north of Sicily, its inhabitants rely on the production of corn, olives and grapes for their livelihood. Each September the village holds a Festival of Grapes and Wine where these farm products and other agricultural produce is displayed. The area around San Giuseppe Jato is also known for its beef cattle breeding and as a centre for woodturning and iron works.

== In media ==
The movie Sicilian Ghost Story tells the real story of 11-year-old Giuseppe di Matteo's 1993 kidnapping, strangling and disposal in an acid vat after 779 days in captivity on 11 January 1996 in San Giuseppe Jato by Sicilian Mafia boss Giovanni Brusca in retaliation for Giuseppe's father Santino Di Matteo's turning state witness ("pentito") in the case of anti-Mafia Judge Giovanni Falcone's murder.

== Photos ==
Coming into San Giuseppe Jato, March 2009

A street in San Giuseppe Jato, March 2009
