= Mandamento (Sicilian Mafia) =

District of three geographically contiguous Mafia cosche

Within the Cosa Nostra, a mandamento is traditionally a district of three geographically contiguous Mafia cosche, which are families controlling a single land feud, or a city ward, in Sicily. A capomandamento represents the head of a territory, the mandamento, and is usually entitled to be part of the provincial Mafia Commission.

== List of mandamenti ==
Palermo – The city of Palermo is divided into 8 local mandamenti: Porta Nuova, Brancaccio, Boccadifalco, Passo di Rigano, Santa Maria di Gesù, Noce, Pagliarelli, Resuttana and San Lorenzo.

Province of Palermo – The province of Palermo is divided into 7 mandamenti: Camporeale (born from the merger of the mandamenti of Partinico and San Giuseppe Jato), Corleone, Cinisi, Bagheria, Trabia, Belmonte Mezzagno, San Mauro Castelverde.

Province of Agrigento – The province of Agrigento consists of 10 mandamenti: Agrigento, Santa Elisabetta, Porto Empedocle, Canicattì, Cianciana, Ribera, Sambuca di Sicilia, Casteltermini, Palma di Montechiaro and Campobello di Licata.

Province of Trapani – The province of Trapani consists of 4 mandamenti: Castelvetrano, Trapani, Mazara del Vallo and Alcamo.

Province of Caltanissetta – The province of Caltanissetta consists of 4 mandamenti: Gela, Vallelunga Pratameno, Riesi and Mussomeli.

=== Other provinces ===
Province of Catania – The province of Catania has no mandamenti, but is instead controlled by 3 mafia families: Catania, Caltagirone and Ramacca.

Province of Enna – The province of Enna has no mandamenti, but is instead controlled by 5 mafia families: Barrafranca, Calascibetta, Enna, Pietraperzia and Villarosa.

== See also ==
- List of Sicilian Mafia clans
