= Caccamo Cathedral =

Church in Caccamo, Sicily, Italy

Coordinates: 37°55′51″N 13°39′38″E

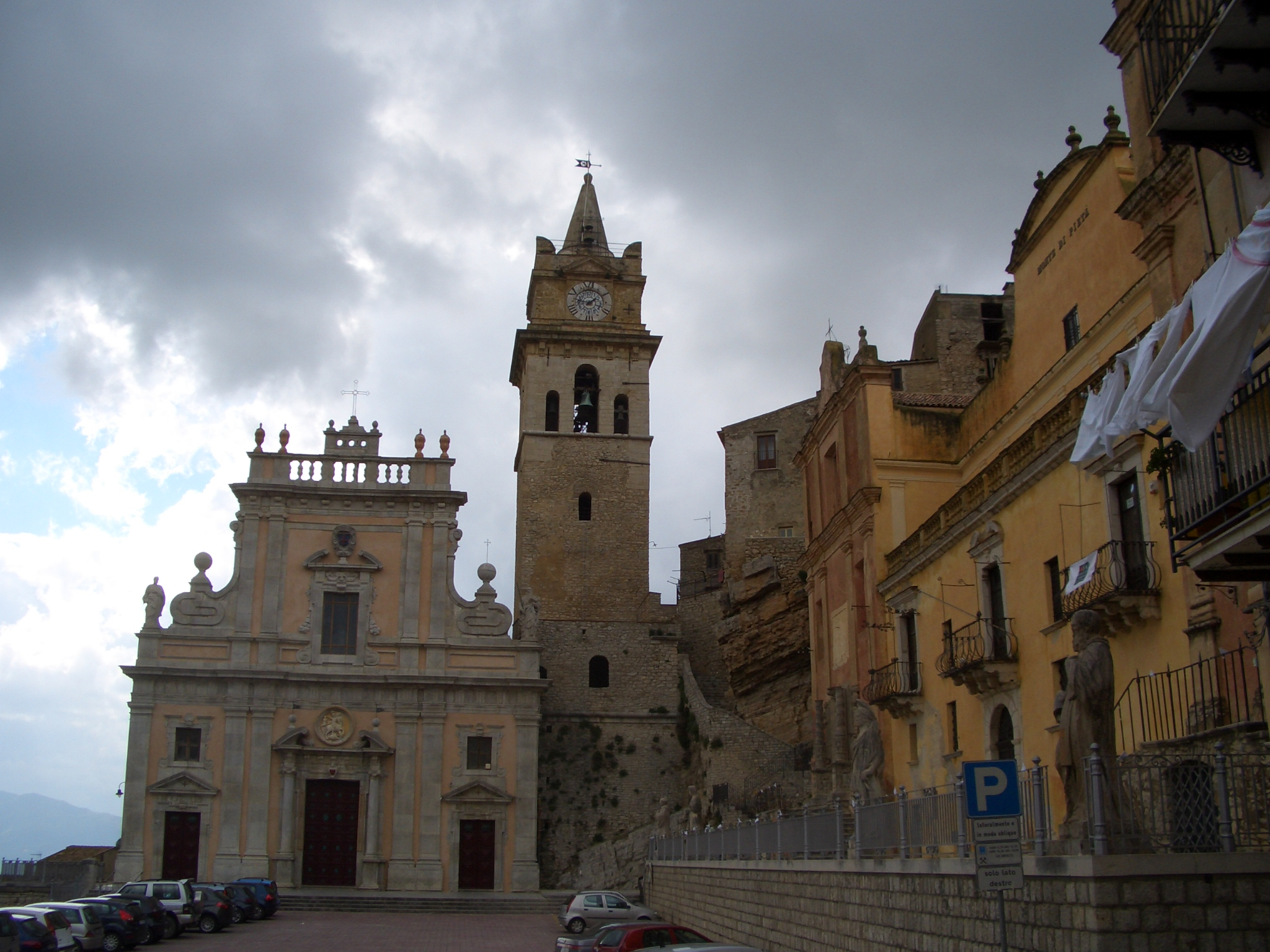

Caccamo Cathedral (Italian: duomo di San Giorgio Martire, matrice di Caccamo or Cattedrale di Caccamo) is the main church in the Italian city of Caccamo in Sicily. The largest church in the city, it belongs to the Archdiocese of Palermo and the 'arcipretura' of Caccamo. The present building on Piazza Duomo dates to 1616. Its dedication to the warrior saint George the Martyr originated with the Normans and was in memory of their victory over the Saracens near Cerami in 1090.

== History ==
According to popular tradition the city's first duomo was the church of Sant'Anna e Santa Venera, now destroyed, on the margins of the ancient 'Terravecchia' quarter just outside Caccamo Castle. Around 1094 the first mother church was built, which seems to have been a small chapel for the Norman royal court - it is recorded on a stone inscription now inside the present building.

The first church dedicated to Saint George was on the same site, funded by the Chiaramonte family. Between 1477 and 1480 it was extended and enriched with several artworks, expressions of the Sicilian Renaissance, thanks to the generosity of the Enríquez-Prades-Cabrera family. According to Agostino Inveges, the most authoritative historical source, the church remained small even after this expansion.

In 1606 the jurors, the Enríquez and Amato families and canon Paolo Muscia decided to build a new larger mother church to meet the city's now-expanded population. A design from commissioned from the Termitan architect Vincenzo La Barbera. In 1614 the church was rebuilt in the Sicilian Baroque style, funded by donations from the city's merchants. All the artworks from the previous building were placed in the new one, which now also houses subsequent commissions and artworks from other abandoned or destroyed churches.

== Gallery ==
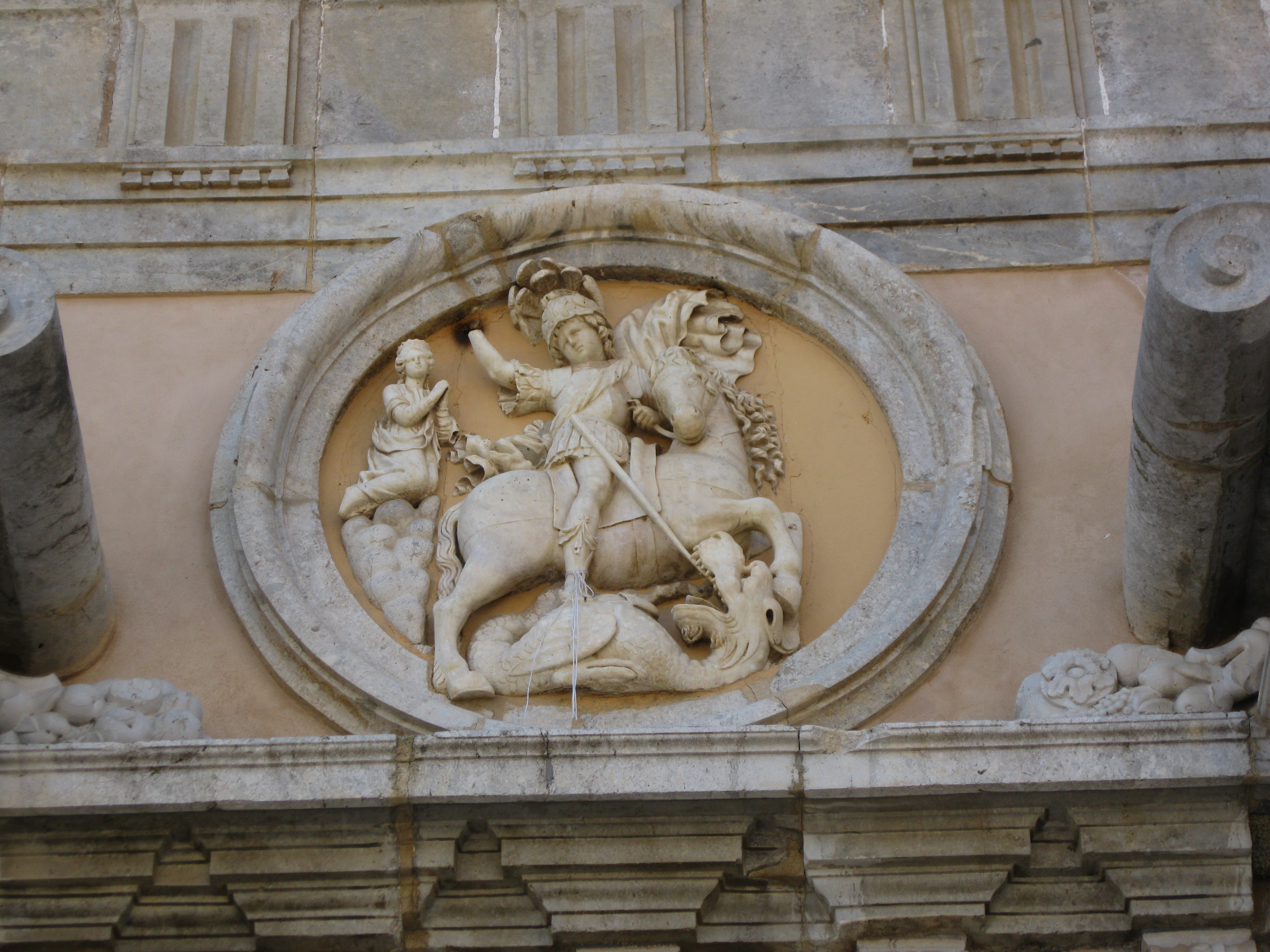
High relief by Gaspare Guercio from the facade, showing Saint George

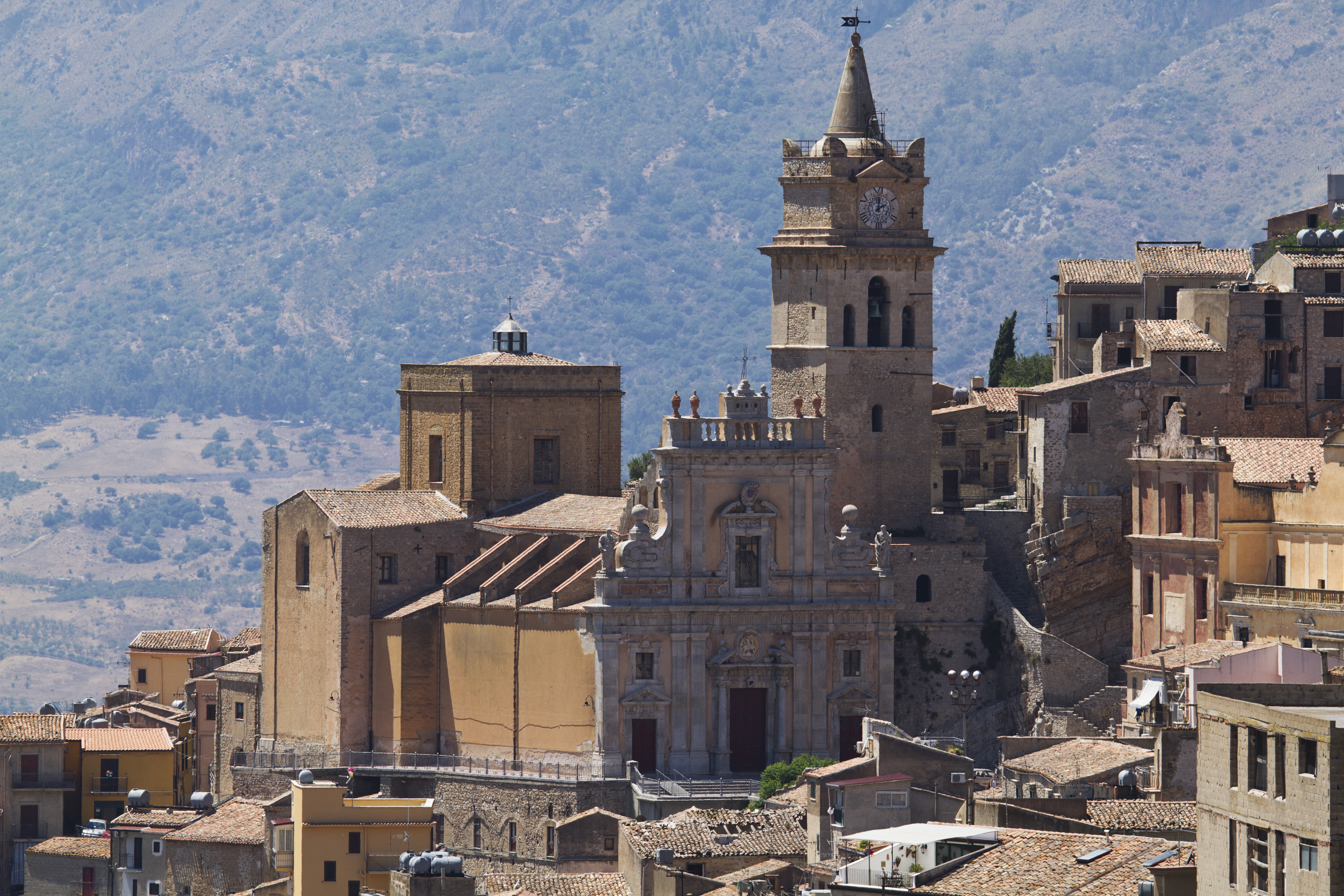
The complex

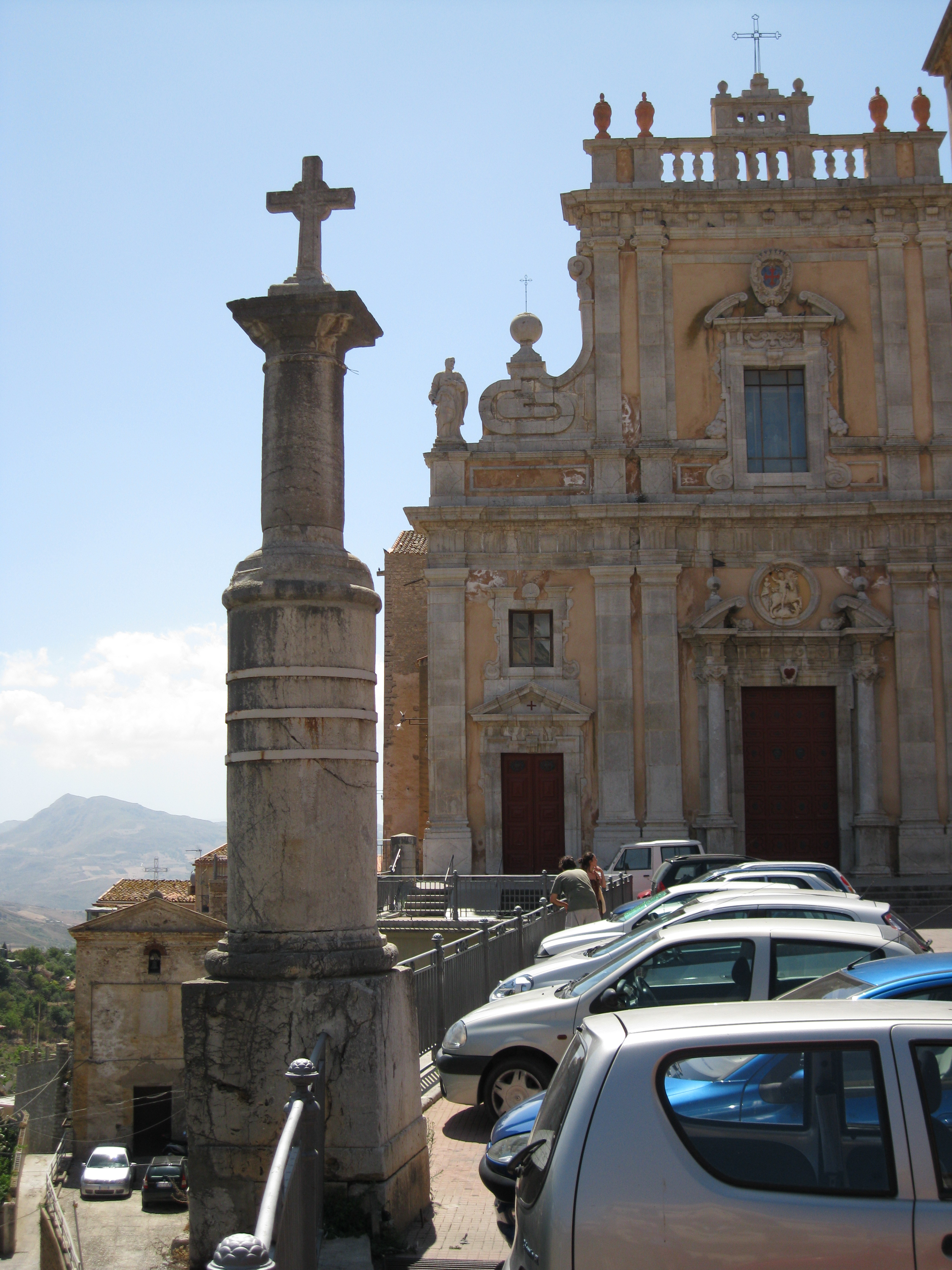
The 'colonna della gogna'

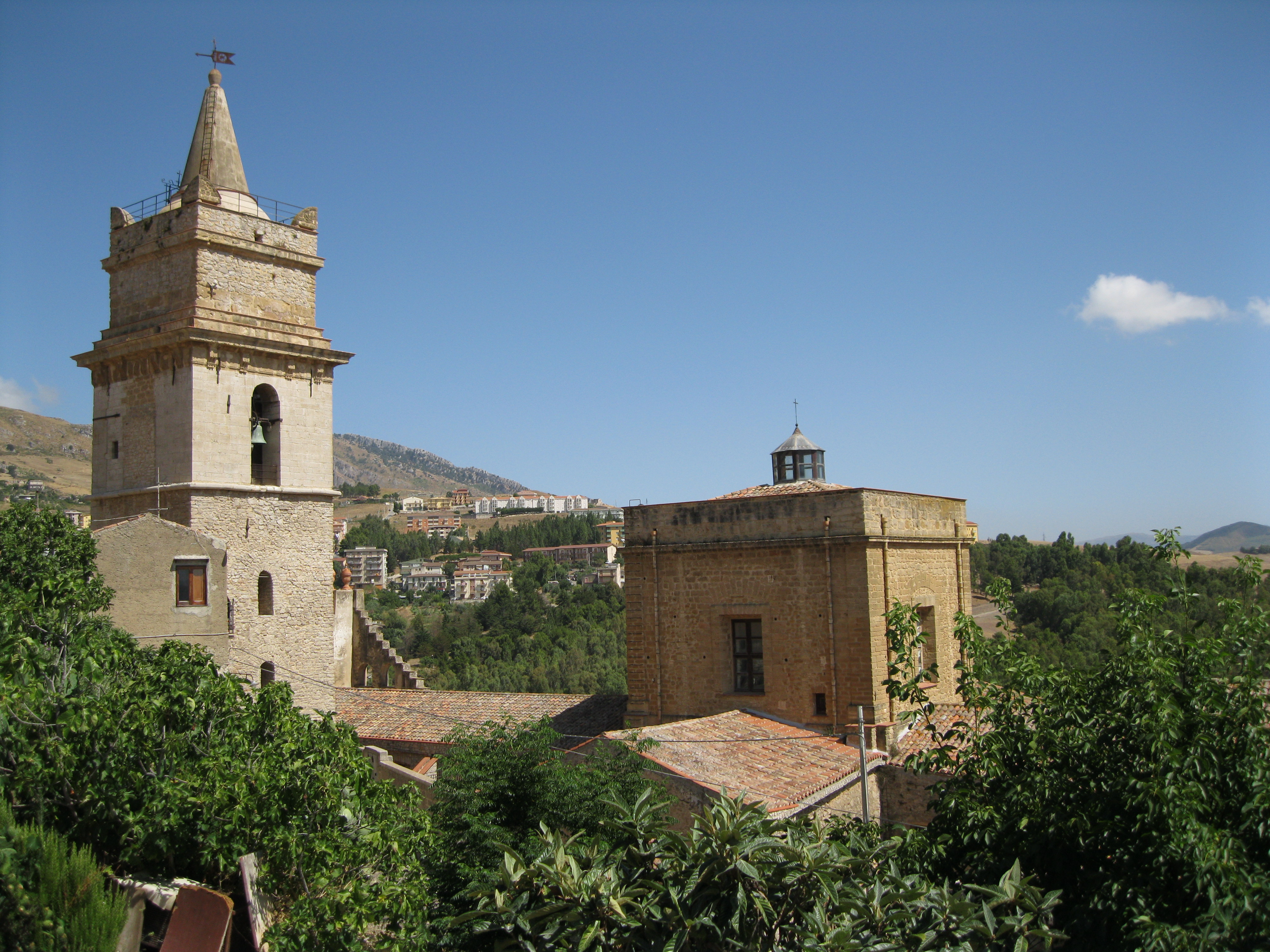
Bell-tower and exterior of the dome

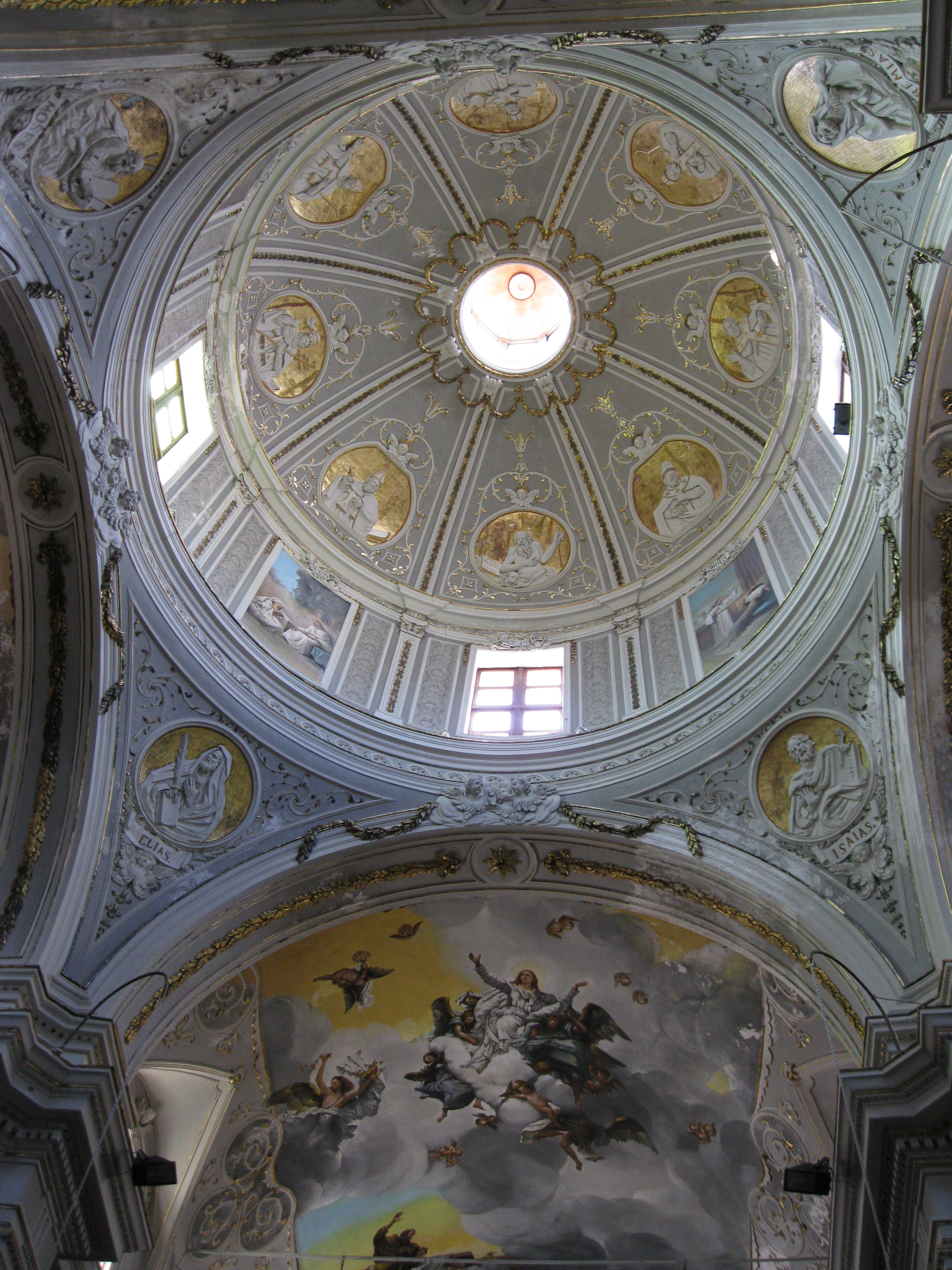
Interior of the dome

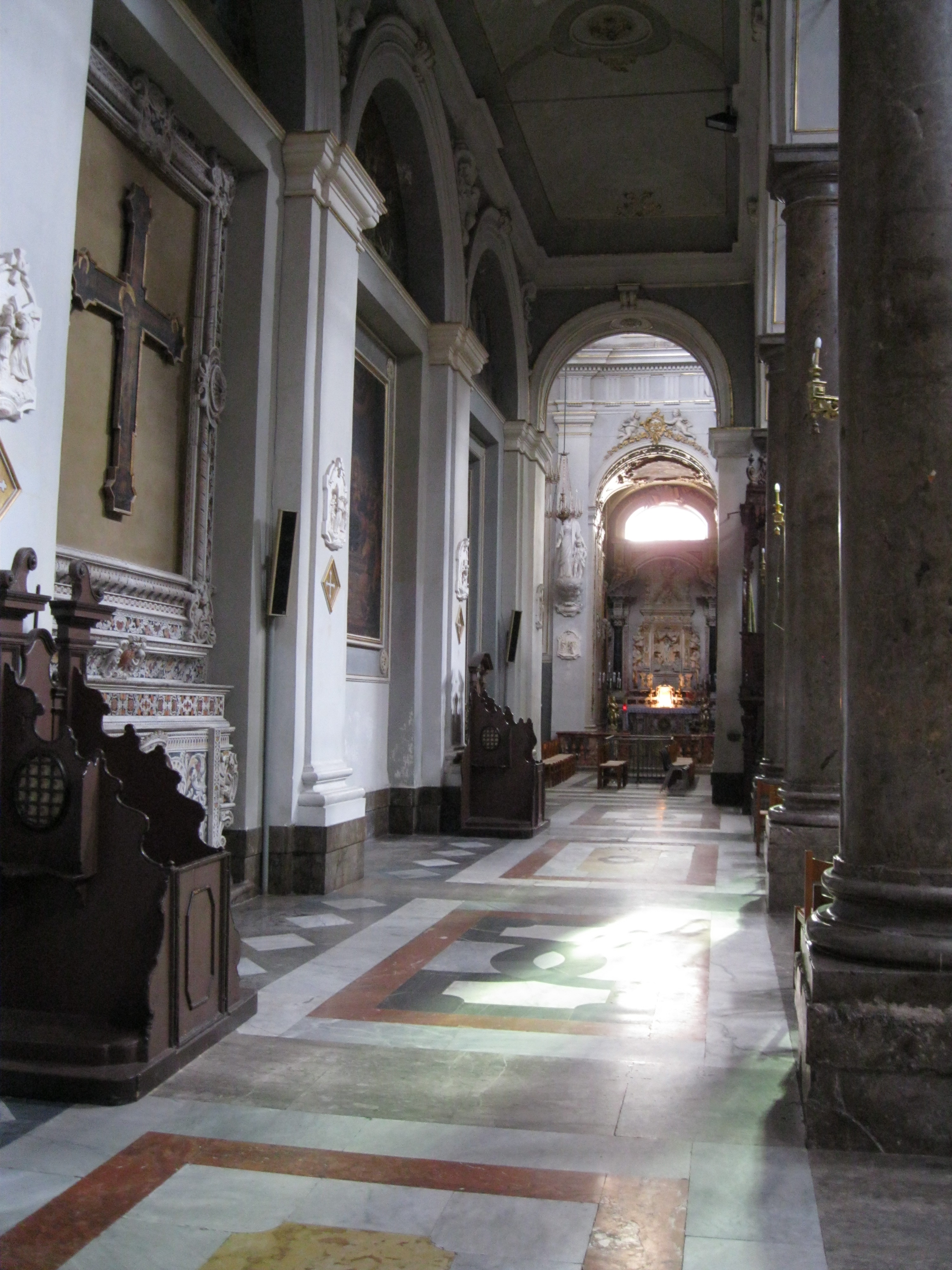
North aisle

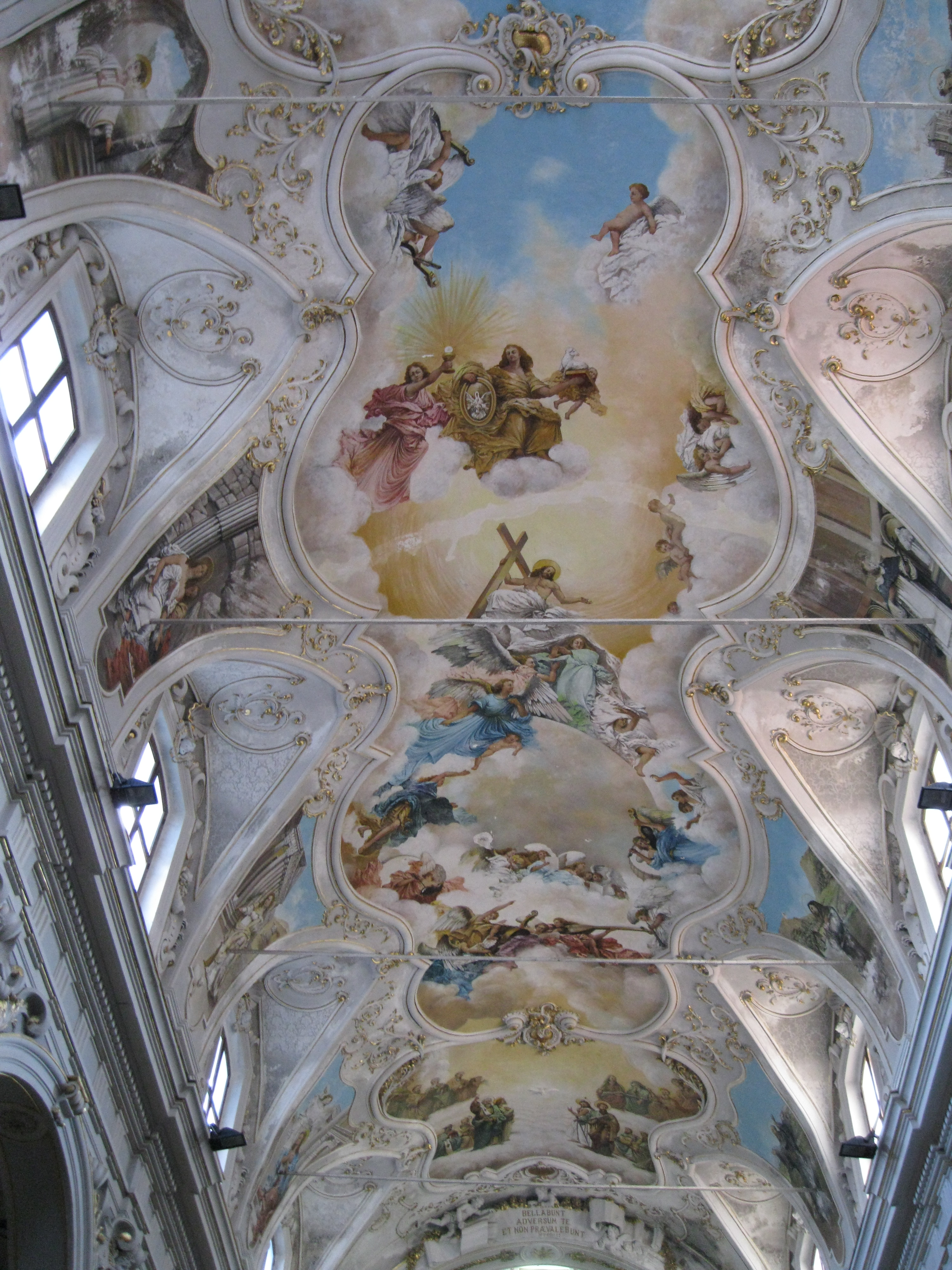
Ceiling frescoes

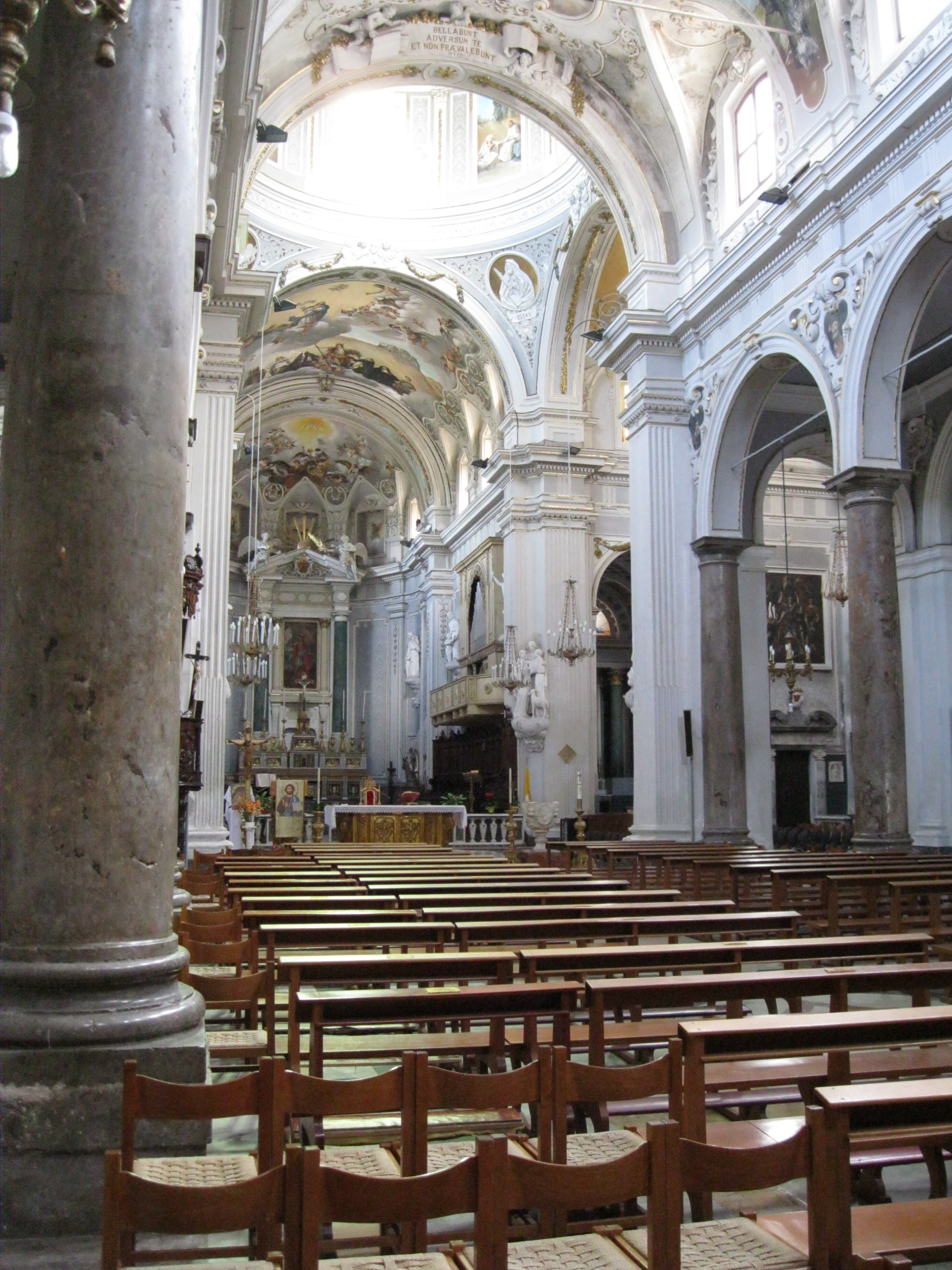
Central aisle

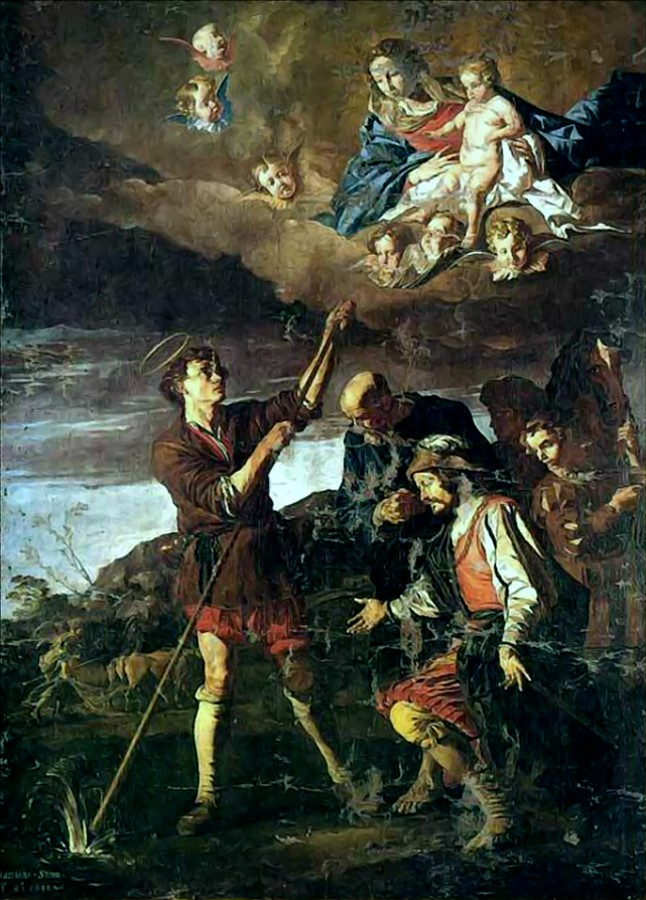
Matthias Stomer, Miracle of Saint Isidore Agricola, 1641, in the sacristy
