= Andrea Manciaracina =

Member of the Sicilian Mafia

Andrea Manciaracina (Italian pronunciation: [anˈdrɛːa ˌmantʃaraˈtʃiːna]; born 7 April 1962), sometimes spelt Mangiaracina, is a member of Sicilian Mafia.

He was born in Mazara del Vallo in the province of Trapani. He was initiated in Cosa Nostra in 1985 or 1986. In 1992, after the arrest of Mariano Agate, he became reggente (regent) of the mandamento of Mazara del Vallo, a position he shared with Vincenzo Sinacori.

According to Sinacori, who became a pentito in 1996 and started to collaborate with Italian justice, it had been Cosa Nostra boss Totò Riina who favoured the nomination of Manciaracina. His father Vito Manciaracina had been a frontman for one of Riina's companies. Father and son Manciaracina were among the few who knew how to reach the fugitive Riina. (Vito Manciaracina was initiated in 1989 and arrested on 27 May 2001)

Manciaracina's name was mentioned in the trial against Giulio Andreotti. The sevenfold Prime Minister of Italy stood accused of collusion with Cosa Nostra. Investigators found that Andreotti, at the time minister of Foreign Affairs, had met Manciaracina at a meeting in Hotel Hopps in Mazara del Vallo on August 19, 1985, and held a private conversation. Initially, Andreotti denied the episode and later, when it became clear that there was undeniable proof, he claimed was not aware of the position of Manciaracina. Andreotti has been absolved from any charge in 2004.

Manciaracina became part of a "directorate" that ruled Cosa Nostra since 1995 and was established by Bernardo Provenzano after Totò Riina's arrest. This group "of about four to seven people met very infrequently, only when necessary, when there were strategic decisions to make." Among the other members of the directorate were Salvatore Lo Piccolo from Palermo; Benedetto Spera from Belmonte Mezzagno; Salvatore Rinella from Trabia; Giuseppe Balsano from Monreale; Matteo Messina Denaro from Castelvetrano; Vincenzo Virga from Trapani; and Antonino Giuffrè from Caccamo.

Manciaracina had been a fugitive since 1991. Until his arrest on 31 January 2003, – with Natale Bonafede, the Mafia boss of Marsala – he was on the "Most wanted list" of the 30 most dangerous criminals of the Italian Ministry of the Interior.
