= Benedetto Spera =

Member of the Sicilian Mafia

Benedetto Spera

Benedetto Spera (Italian pronunciation: [beneˈdetto ˈspɛːra]; born 1 July 1934) is a member of the Sicilian Mafia and the boss of the Belmonte Mezzagno Mafia family and the mandamento of Belmonte Mezzagno in the province of Palermo, Sicily, southern Italy. He was convicted in absentia for the killing of the two prominent anti-mafia judges Paolo Borsellino and Giovanni Falcone, receiving life sentences.

Spera was born in Belmonte Mezzagno, near Palermo. His first conviction in the 1950s was for illegally pasturing his sheep. Later, he made a lot of money from the skimming of public works contracts. Spera was a member of the Sicilian Mafia Commission as an ally to the Corleonesi and became one of the most trusted advisers of Bernardo Provenzano.

Spera became part of a "directorate" that ruled Cosa Nostra after 1995 when it was established by Provenzano. This group "of about four to seven people met very infrequently, only when necessary, when there were strategic decisions to make". Among the other members of the directorate were Salvatore Lo Piccolo from Palermo; Andrea Manciaracina from Mazara del Vallo; Salvatore Rinella from Trabia; Giuseppe Balsano from Monreale; Matteo Messina Denaro from Castelvetrano; Vincenzo Virga from Trapani; and Antonino Giuffrè from Caccamo.

Spera was arrested on 20 January 2001. Police apprehended him at a farmhouse in Mezzojuso, 40 kilometres outside of Palermo, where he was to meet Provenzano and Spera's personal physician. Spera and his physician were taken into custody, however, Provenzano was nowhere to be found.

== Sources ==
- (in Italian) Oliva, Ernesto & Salvo Palazzolo (2001). L’altra mafia: Biografia di Bernardo Provenzano, Soveria Mannelli (CZ): Rubbettino Editore.
