= Vincenzo Virga =

Italian mafia boss

- Mugshot of Vincenzo Virga
- Born: 11 September 1936 (age 90); Erice, Province of Trapani, Sicily, Kingdom of Italy
- Occupation: Head of the Trapani Mafia family
- Status: Imprisoned since 2001
- Allegiance: Trapani Mafia family / Sicilian Mafia
- Criminal charge: Multiple murders
- Penalty: Life imprisonment

Vincenzo Virga (Italian: [vinˈtʃɛntso ˈvirɡa]; born 11 September 1936 in Erice, Province of Trapani) has been the boss of the Trapani Mafia family and mandamento since 1982, when the previous boss, Salvatore Minore, was murdered. Virga is currently in prison, serving life imprisonment for ordering the Pizzolungo bombing among other crimes.

== Biography ==
Virga was one of the trusted men of Bernardo Provenzano and considered to be his financial brain. He was one of the members of the directorate that ruled Cosa Nostra, which was established by Provenzano after the arrest of Totò Riina. It consisted of about four to seven people who met infrequently, only when necessary, when there were strategic decisions to be made. Among the other members were Salvatore Lo Piccolo; Antonino Giuffrè from Caccamo; Benedetto Spera from Belmonte Mezzagno; Salvatore Rinella from Trabia; Giuseppe Balsano from Monreale; Matteo Messina Denaro from Castelvetrano; and Andrea Manciaracina from Mazara del Vallo. Virga's real skill was in masterminding the intricate financial dealings of the Mafia. His strong political and social support made it hard to arrest him.

From 1994, Virga was a fugitive on the list of most wanted fugitives in Italy for the murders of the judge Alberto Giacomelli and the journalist Mauro Rostagno. He was later acquitted of these murders.

On 21 February 2001, Virga was arrested in a remote cottage near Trapani while watching a video documentary about the 1992 assassinations of the two Antimafia judges Giovanni Falcone and Paolo Borsellino and surrounded by documents detailing the award of public works contracts to firms he controlled. When he was arrested, police chief Giuseppe Linares said of Virga, "He is a magician in piloting contracts. We have caught the business brain of Bernardo Provenzano." Under Virga's direction, the apparently sleepy, non-descript town of Trapani, with more banks than Italian cities five times its size, became a magnet for hundreds of millions of mafia revenue, which was recycled by investing in land developments and waste disposal.

In 2002, Virga, along with Balduccio Di Maggio and Totò Riina were convicted for ordering the Pizzolungo bombing of 1985 that left three dead, the sentence confirmed again in 2004.

On 15 May 2007, the Appeal Court in Milan sentenced the Forza Italia Senator and Silvio Berlusconi's right-hand man Marcello Dell'Utri and Virga to two years each for attempted extortion of Trapani Basket Ball team by Publitalia, the Fininvest concessionaire. Four years later, the Appeal Court in Milan nullified the sentence and absolved Dell'Utri and Virga because there is no substance to the fact.
