= Antonino Giuffrè =

Former member of the Sicilian Mafia (born 1945)

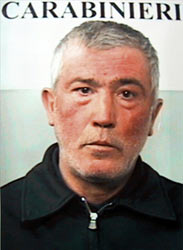
- Born: Antonino Giuffrè; 21 July 1945 (age 81); Caccamo, Italy
- Other name: "Nino"
- Occupation: Mobster
- Relatives: John Stanfa (uncle)
- Allegiance: Corleonesi

Antonino "Nino" Giuffrè (Italian pronunciation: [(anto)ˈniːno dʒufˈfrɛ]; born 21 July 1945) is an Italian former mafioso who later became a justice collaborator. The head of the mandamento of Caccamo, he was the second-highest ranked member of Cosa Nostra. He became one of the most important Mafia turncoats, or pentito, after his arrest in April 2002, providing further information about its inner workings.

As a state witness, Giuffrè provided information about the ties of Giulio Andreotti, Silvio Berlusconi, Salvatore Cuffaro, and Marcello Dell'Utri with the Mafia. He also testified on the role of the Mafia in the murder of Roberto Calvi and their plot to kill the then Antimafia Commission president Giuseppe Lumia.

== Early life and Mafia career ==
Giuffrè was born in Caccamo, in the province of Palermo, in the modern-day Southern Italian region of Sicily. Among his relatives was John Stanfa, an Italian-born American former boss of the Philadelphia crime family from 1991 to 1995; Stanfa was his uncle. Giuffrè was trained as an agricultural sciences specialist. He had a top position within Cosa Nostra, and his rise in the Mafia ran parallel to the ascension of the Corleonesi clan headed by Salvatore Riina and later by Bernardo Provenzano, to whom he was particularly close. After the arrest of Caccamo boss Francesco Intile, Giuffrè became the head of the mandamento of Caccamo. Giuffrè was known in Mafia circles as Manuzza ("Small Hand") because his right hand was crippled by polio. Others claim he lost his hand in a hunting accident.

== Pentito ==
Giuffrè was arrested on the morning of 16 April 2002, in a sheepfold near Roccapalumba. At the time of his arrest, the police found hundreds of pizzini on him. Giuffrè started feeding investigators information even before he agreed to turn state witness in June 2002. He is one of the most important Mafia turncoats since Tommaso Buscetta in 1984. His collaboration updated investigators' knowledge and provided a new interpretation of the sensitive issue of Cosa Nostra's relations with politics in the early 1990s. Giuffrè said: "It's very simple: we are the fish and politics is the water."

Giuffrè showed an encyclopedic knowledge of Cosa Nostra's affairs over the past two decades, partly from having played host to "The Pope" Michele Greco in the 1980s, when the supreme mafia boss was on the run and took refuge near Caccamo, Giuffrè's home town. Subsequently, he became one of the right-hand men of Provenzano, who became the Mafia's reference point when Riina was arrested in January 1993. According to Antonio Ingroia, a leading anti-Mafia magistrate in Sicily, Giuffrè became part of the directorate that was established by Provenzano. This group "of about four to seven people" met very infrequently, only when necessary, when there were strategic decisions to make. Among the other members of the directorate were Salvatore Lo Piccolo from Palermo; Benedetto Spera from Belmonte Mezzagno; Salvatore Rinella from Trabia; Giuseppe Balsano from Monreale; Matteo Messina Denaro from Castelvetrano; Vincenzo Virga from Trapani; and Andrea Manciaracina from Mazara del Vallo. Messina Denaro, who was the latest fugitive of the Mafia's massacres until his arrest in January 2023, reportedly asked for the execution of pentiti like Giuffrè.

== Relations between the Mafia and Forza Italia ==
According to Giuffrè the Mafia turned to Forza Italia, the political party of Berlusconi, to look after the Mafia's interests following the decline in the early 1990s of the ruling Christian Democracy party, whose leaders in Sicily looked after the Mafia's interests in Rome. The Mafia's fallout with Christian Democracy became clear when Salvatore Lima, their strong man in Sicily, was killed in March 1992. Giuffrè told the court: "The Lima murder marked the end of an era. A new era opened with a new political force on the horizon which provided the guarantees that the Christian Democracy were no longer able to deliver. To be clear, that party was Forza Italia." According to Giuffrè, Dell'Utri — Berlusconi's right-hand man and the man who invented Forza Italia — was the go-between on a range of legislative efforts to ease pressure on mobsters in exchange for electoral support. Giuffrè said that Bernardo Provenzano told him that they "were in good hands" with Dell'Utri, whom he described as a "serious and trustworthy person", and was close to Berlusconi. Giuffrè stated that "Dell'Utri was very close to Cosa Nostra and a very good contact point for Berlusconi." Provenzano said that the Mafia's judicial problems would be resolved within 10 years after 1992 thanks to the undertakings given by Forza Italia.

Giuffrè said that Berlusconi himself used to be in touch with Stefano Bontade, a top Mafia boss, in the mid-1970s. At the time, Berlusconi was still just a wealthy real estate developer and started his private television empire; Berlusconi became prime minister from 1994 to 1995, and again from 2001 to 2006 and from 2008 to 2011. Bontade visited Berlusconi's villa in Arcore. Bontade's contact at Berlusconi's villa was the late Vittorio Mangano, a convicted mafioso who was alleged to have worked there as a stableman. Giuffrè declared that other Mafia representatives who were in contact with Berlusconi included the Palermo bosses Filippo Graviano and Giuseppe Graviano — arrested in 1994 and jailed for life ordering the murder of anti-Mafia priest Pino Puglisi in their territory Brancaccio. The alleged pact with the Mafia fell apart in 2002. Cosa Nostra had achieved nothing as there were no revisions of Mafia trials, no changes in the law of asset seizures, and no changes in the harsh prison laws (41 bis).

== State witness ==
Giuffrè was a state witness in many important trials. He told an Italian court that Andreotti was a key Mafia contact during his long political career. Giuffrè said Mafia bosses had asked Andreotti to shield them from magistrates. Giuffrè also gave testimony in the Calvi murder trial, although all the defendants were acquitted. He testified that Mafia bosses had been angry at the way Calvi had mishandled their money and ordered the hit. He named Giuseppe Calò as the man who organised the crime. Giuffrè said: "Within Cosa Nostra, we had some big laughs when we read in the newspapers that Calvi had committed suicide. Cosa Nostra's problems get resolved in only one way: by elimination." According to Giuffrè, the Mafia plotted to kill Lumia during the period he was president of the Antimafia Commission (2000–2001). The plan to kill Lumia was decided at the very highest level of Cosa Nostra and had been approved by Provenzano but was not carried out. He also stated that Cosa Nostra had supported Cuffaro as president of Sicily.
