= Pizzolungo bombing =

1985 car bombing by the Sicilian mafia

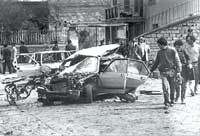
- After the blast
- Location: 38.0581°N 12.5583°E; Pizzolungo, Italy
- Date: 2 April 1985; 8:35 (GMT)
- Attack type: Assassination
- Weapon: Car bomb (made using TNT)
- Deaths: 3
- Injuries: 5
- Perpetrator: Sicilian Mafia

The Pizzolungo Bombing was a car-bomb attack on 2 April 1985 undertaken by the Sicilian Mafia in order to kill Carlo Palermo, a magistrate in Pizzolungo, Sicily. Palermo had been investigating an international drug and arms trafficking network in which Italian politicians may have been involved. Palermo was injured in the attack and three passersby were killed: Barbara Rizzo and her young twin sons, Salvatore and Giuseppe Asta.

== Attack ==
On the morning of 2 April 1985 a car bomb loaded with TNT exploded on the side of the highway through Pizzolungo. It was set to detonate as deputy prosecutor Carlo Palermo traveled from his house in Bonagia to the Palace of Justice in Trapani in an armored Fiat 132 followed by an unarmored Fiat Ritmo. Just before the bomb exploded, Palermo's car was overtaken by a Volkswagen Scirocco, driven by Barbara Rizzo, 30, who was taking her six-year-old twins Giuseppe and Salvatore Asta, to school. Her vehicle was caught between the car bomb and the Fiat 132. The explosion was heard miles away.

Palermo was wounded, but the Scirocco bore the brunt of the blast, killing its occupants. Barbara Rizzo was thrown out of the car while the bodies of the children were scattered much further away. One body landed on the wall of a building 200 yards (180 meters) away, mangled beyond recognition. Among the first responders were the woman's husband, Nunzio Asta, and his brother. But her vehicle was destroyed to such an extent that Nunzio and his brother did not suspect that the family was involved in the explosion. After the arrival of the police and emergency services, Nunzio went home, and then left by car to go to his workshop. Shortly after, the police called to ask for the license plate number of the car and Nunzio found out that one of his employees had already discovered his children had never reached school.

Of the four bodyguards in the rear Fiat car, two were slightly injured while the other two were severely hit by shrapnel: Anthony Ruggiero was hit in the eye, while Salvatore La Porta was hit in the head and other parts of his body.

== Aftermath ==
The prosecutor on the case was Sebastiano Patanè.

Among the survivors, Raffaele Di Mercurio, 36 years old at the time of the massacre, died in 1993 due to heart disease. In the same year, because of heart problems, Nunzio Asta died (at the time of the attack he had already undergone heart-bypass surgery). His oldest daughter Margherita, 11 years old at the time of the bombing, became active as an adult in the anti-mafia movement Libera in the province of Trapani.

Gioacchino Calabrò was charged with terrorism and conspiring with others to commit a massacre for the attack. But the charges were quashed in 1991 after judges ruled the defendants would not have committed the crime. Among those judges were Corrado Carnevale.

In 2002, the Mafiosi Balduccio Di Maggio, Vincenzo Virga and Totò Riina were convicted for ordering the massacre, confirmed again in 2004.

== Memorial ==
A memorial has been constructed at the site of the attack. A quote on the monument reads:

Resigned to death the victims of injustice 02.04.1985 await the redemption from the slavery of the Sicilian Mafia. Barbara, Giuseppe and Salvatore Asta

Following a national competition won by the group Lg=mC (Giovanni Lucentini, Marcello Calà), work began in April 2011 on the construction of a memorial park at the site of the attack.

== See also ==
- Terrorism in the European Union
