= Baldassare Di Maggio =

Member of the Sicilian Mafia

Baldassare Di Maggio (San Giuseppe Jato, 19 November 1954), also known as Balduccio, was a member of the Mafia, who became a government witness (pentito) and helped capture Salvatore Riina.

== Mafioso ==
Di Maggio was born in San Giuseppe Jato, a town in the province of Palermo and was initiated in 1981 in the local Mafia family, headed by Bernardo Brusca. He was involved in the elimination of Rosario Riccobono and 14 other men of Riccobono's Mafia clan in November 1982 during the Second Mafia War. In 2001, he received an 11-year prison sentence, which took into account his testimonies as a government witness.

When the capo-famiglia of San Giuseppe Jato, Bernardo Brusca, a member of the Sicilian Mafia Commission went to prison and his son Giovanni Brusca was banished to Linosa, Di Maggio became acting head of the family. However, when Giovanni Brusca returned in 1990, Di Maggio became an uncomfortable presence who needed to be eliminated. A peace meeting was convened by Riina, but Di Maggio did not trust the set-up and fled from Sicily for his life.

Di Maggio along with Vincenzo Virga and Salvatore Riina, organised the 1985 Pizzolungo bombing that left three dead; in 2002, the three were sentenced to life imprisonment for the massacre, confirmed again in 2004.

== Capture of Riina ==
Riina reprimanded Di Maggio, an ambitious mafioso who had left his wife and children for a mistress, telling him he would never be made a full boss. Knowing Riina would order the death of subordinates whom he considered unreliable, Di Maggio fled Sicily in 1992 and collaborated with the Carabinieri police after he was arrested on 8 January 1993 in Novara. On 11 January Di Maggio returned to Sicily under the custody of the Carabinieri operative squad because he could recognize Riina despite having been a fugitive since 1969. On 12 January, Di Maggio recognized a complex of villas located in via Bernini 54 in Palermo, where they assumed Riina lived. On 14 January, the Carabinieri special operational squad, led by Captain Sergio De Caprio (nicknamed "capitano ultimo"), began the surveillance activity around the complex of villas in via Bernini, aboard a white mimetized van (nicknamed "balena"), the same evening De Caprio showed to Di Maggio the surveillance tape of that day, from which he recognized Riina's wife, Ninetta Bagarella, exiting with her children in a Volkswagen Golf driven by a bodyguard. On the morning of 15 January 1993, at 8:55 am, Di Maggio, recognized Salvatore Riina exiting the housing complex in a grey Citroën Zx, driven by his driver, Salvatore Biondino. After that, De Caprio and his men followed the car, blocked it at a roundabout in viale della Regione Siciliana, and arrested Riina and Biondino.

== The "kiss of honour" ==
Di Maggio claimed to have been present at a Mafia meeting with Giulio Andreotti where Totò Riina allegedly greeted the former Prime Minister with a "kiss of honour". He said in testimony to Palermo prosecutors, "I am absolutely certain that I recognized Giulio Andreotti because I saw him many times on television. I interpreted the kiss that Andreotti and Salvatore Riina exchanged as a sign of respect."

According to Di Maggio, the incident happened in September 1987 at the Palermo home of Ignazio Salvo, a high-ranking associate of Andreotti who was accused by informers of being one of the politician's main contacts with Cosa Nostra. "When we walked in, the people present were the Hon. Giulio Andreotti and the Hon. Salvo Lima", Di Maggio said. "They stood up and I shook their hand and kissed Ignazio Salvo. Riina, however, greeted with a kiss all three people."

Andreotti dismissed the charges against him as "lies and slander ... the kiss of Riina, mafia summits ... scenes out of a comic horror film." Veteran journalist Indro Montanelli doubted the claim, saying Andreotti "doesn't even kiss his own children." Di Maggio's credibility had been shaken in the closing weeks of the Andreotti trial when he admitted killing a man while under state protection. Appeal court judges rejected Di Maggio's testimony about the kiss of respect.

== Witness protection ==
Di Maggio, while in the witness protection programme, moved back to his hometown in 1995 and started a vendetta against his enemy Giovanni Brusca in the San Giuseppe Jato, Altofonte and San Cipirello area in co-operation with other pentiti such as Santino Di Matteo and Gioacchino La Barbera. Although key witnesses in several important trials were underway, they recommenced their criminal activities and avenged atrocities by the Bruscas carried out on their family members. On 14 October 1997, Di Maggio was rearrested.

Di Maggio claimed he was encouraged by investigators to chase and help capture Brusca. The affair created a scandal in Italy and damaged the government witness programme and the trial against Andreotti. Di Maggio, who had received a US$300,000 'bonus' under the witness-protection program, had his benefits stripped away. In April 2002, Di Maggio received a life sentence for the killings he committed while being in the witness protection programme.

== Mafia and politics ==
Di Maggio made several declarations on the relationship between the Mafia and politics. According to him, Riina "personally told me more than once that it is not possible for a politician, at any level, to become a man of honour. It is not even possible for a man of honour to start a political career. On the basis of this rule, which was expressed to me in categorical terms, there is a substantial contempt on the part of Cosa Nostra towards politicians, who are not regarded as serious enough to become part of the organisation."

"We obviously give votes to politicians of our choice and after making an agreement with them, but they have to do what we say, otherwise we break their horns", he said. "Politicians' behaviour might sometimes give rise to 'disappointments,' but their function was particularly important for Cosa Nostra and, hence, there was an 'obligation' for all men of honour to vote for the Christian Democrats."
