= Carlo Palermo =

Italian politician

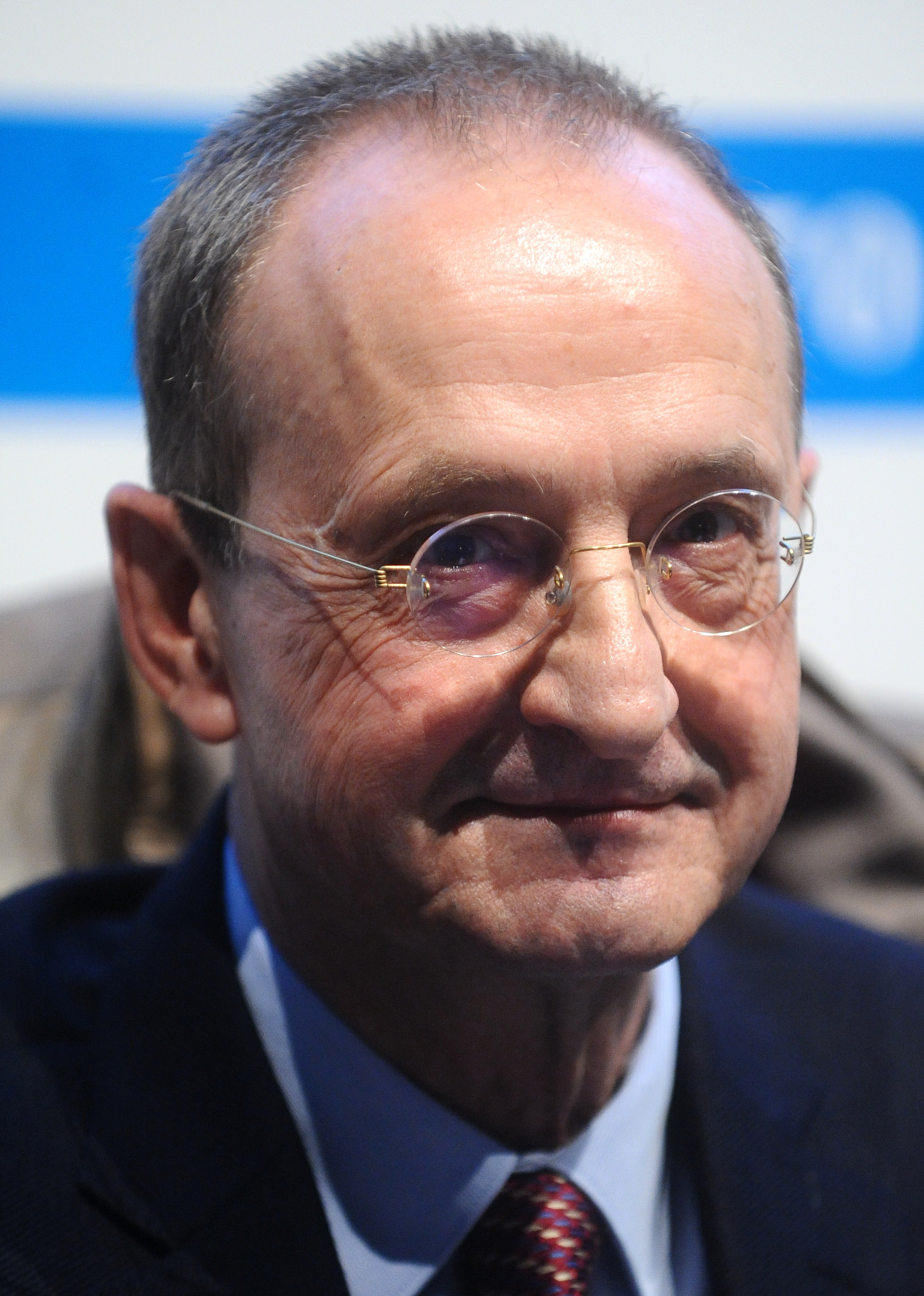
Carlo Palermo nel 2015

Carlo Palermo (born 1947 in Avellino) is an Italian lawyer and investigative magistrate. He was an assistant prosecutor in Trento from 1975 to 1984 and in Trapani till 1989. Afterwards he resigned from the judiciary.

== Life ==
In Italy Carlo Palermo became famous as a magistrate after his criminal investigation into an international drug and arms trafficking network, involving politicians in Trento in 1980, and examining ties between the Mafia, freemasonry and Bulgarian and Syrian spy organizations. Palermo himself was accused of violating parliamentary privileges and obliged to present himself to the CSM (Superior Council of Judiciary). He raised the name of the then prime minister Bettino Craxi in his investigation into illegal arms trafficking. The case was taken from him and transferred to another judge.

Palermo moved to Trapani (Sicily) in 1985, and continued his investigations into political connections with the Mafia; replacing his friend Giangiacomo Ciaccio Montalto, who had been killed by the Mafia in 1983. After a few months the Mafia tried to kill Palermo by means of a car bomb attack. Palermo was only injured, but a young mother, Barbara Asta, and her children, twin brothers Salvatore and Giuseppe, were killed in the explosion. This incident came to be known as the strage di Pizzolungo (Pizzolungo massacre) of 1985 (Pizzolungo is a suburb of Erice). Palermo later decided to resign from the judiciary.

== See also ==
- Paolo Borsellino
- Giovanni Falcone
- Pizzolungo bombing

== Bibliography ==
- Palermo, Carlo (1997). Il giudice. Frammenti di una storia incompiuta, Reverdito ed.
- Stille, Alexander (1995). Excellent Cadavers. The Mafia and the Death of the First Italian Republic, New York: Vintage ISBN 0-09-959491-9
