= Giuseppe Lumia =

Italian politician

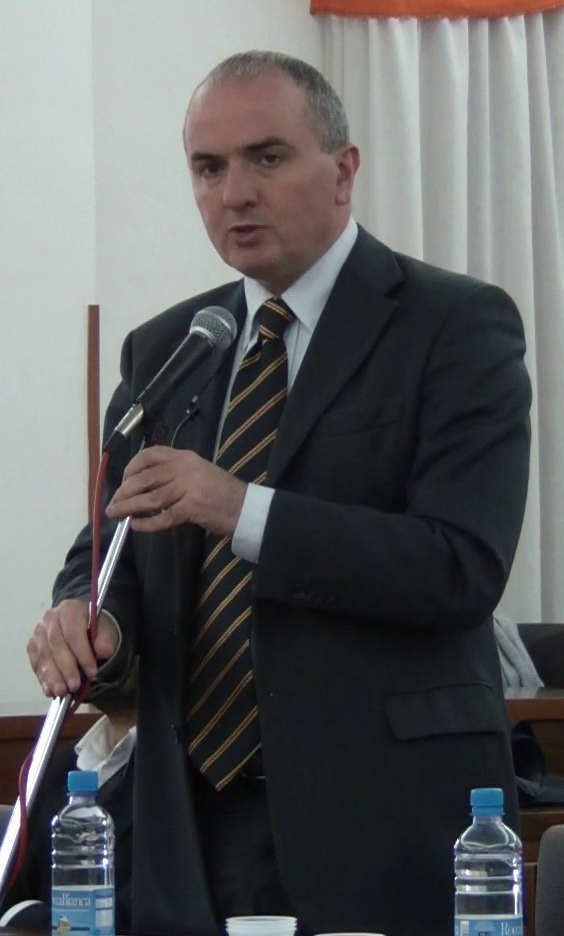
Giuseppe Lumia

Giuseppe Lumia (Termini Imerese, 28 June 1960) is an Italian politician of the Democratic Party of the Left (Partito democratico della Sinistra, PDS) and its successor, the Democrats of the Left (Democratici di Sinistra, DS). He belongs to the group of Social Christians (Cristiano Sociali, CS) in the Party.

Lumia was born in Termini Imerese, in Sicily. In 1994 he was elected in the Italian Chamber of Deputies. He was re-elected in 1996, 2001 and 2006. From 2000 to 2001 he was the president of the Italian Antimafia Commission.

The Mafia plotted to kill Lumia, according to Antonino Giuffrè, one of the right-hand men of Mafia boss Bernardo Provenzano. Giuffrè has been collaborating with investigators since his arrest in April 2002. The plan to kill Lumia while he was president of the Antimafia Commission was decided at the very highest level of Cosa Nostra and had been approved by Provenzano.

Lumia remained an ordinary member of the Antimafia Commission in 2002-2006 and in 2006 he became its vice-president in the new legislature.
