= Gaspare Guercio =

Italian sculptor

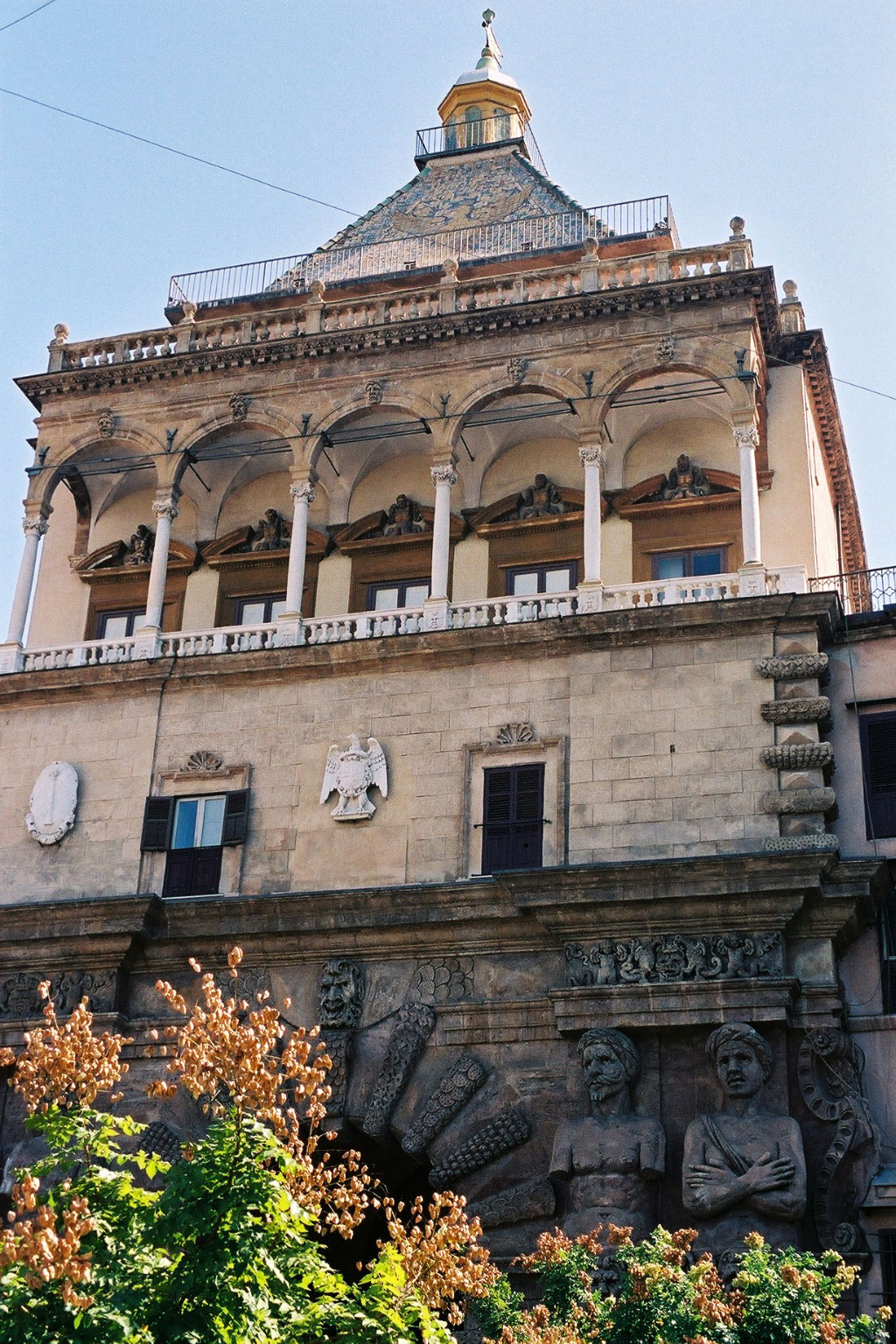
Porta Nuova beside Palazzo dei Normanni.

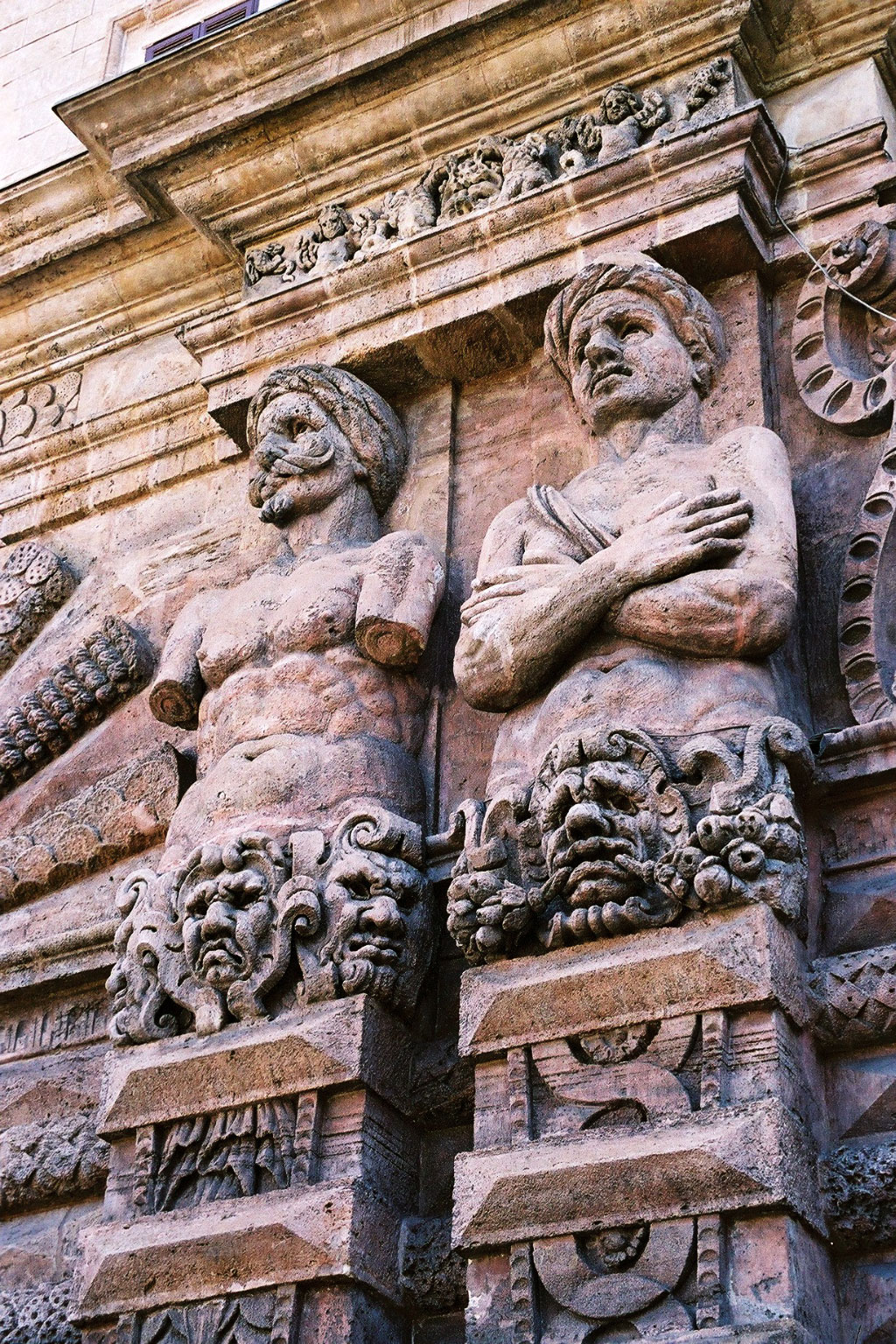
Porta Nuova gate, Palermo

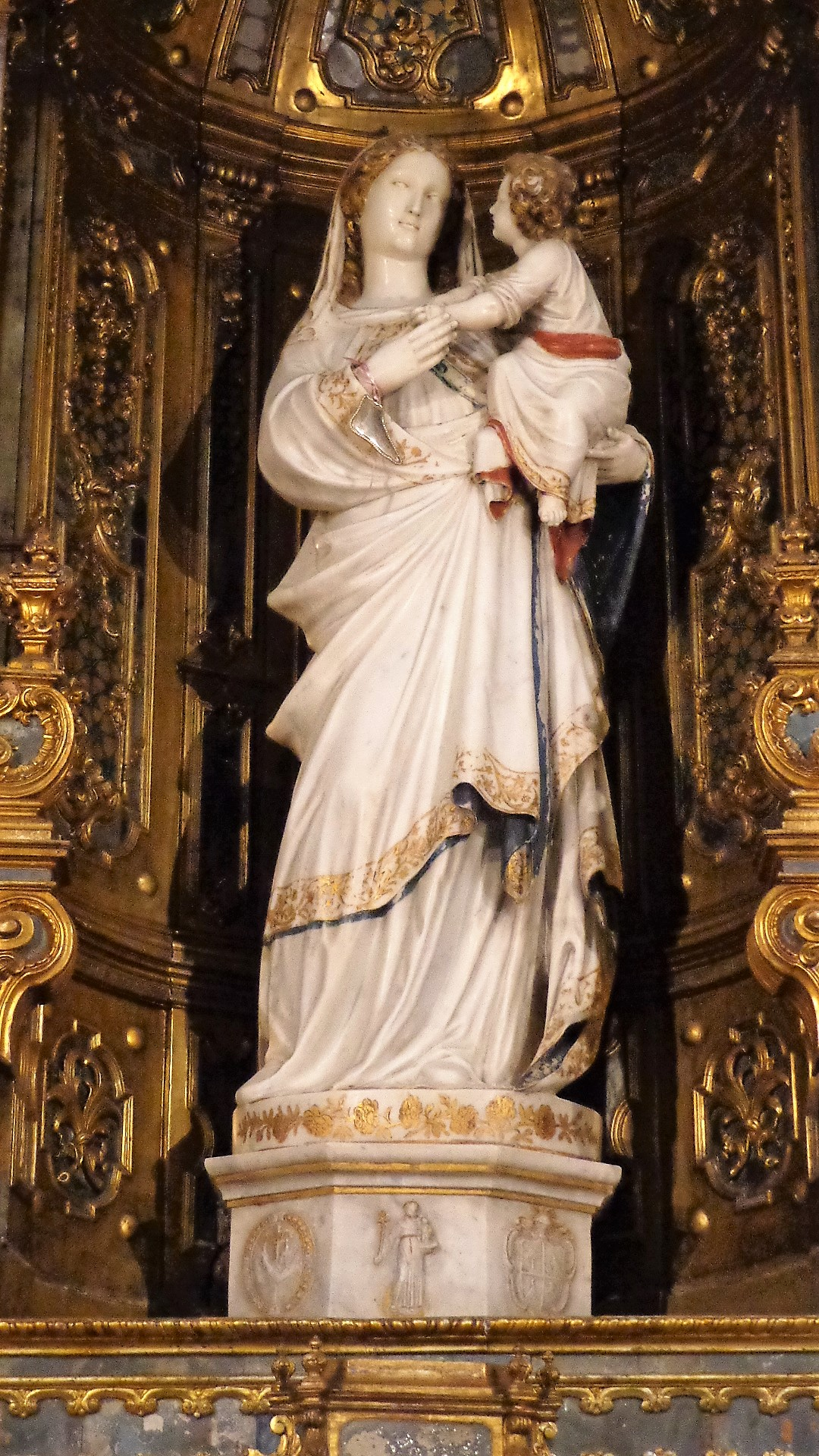
The Trapani Madonna.

Gaspare Guercio (1611 - 1670/1679) was an Italian artist, nicknamed 'Guercio' and a major proponent of the Sicilian Baroque. He was principally a sculptor but also a designer of decorative schemes for architectural projects. He collaborated with his pupil Gaspare Serpotta, father of the more famous Giacomo Serpotta.

== Life ==
Born in Palermo, he was trained in sculpture by his father, a reputed 'marmoraio' and sculptor in his own right.

== Works ==
=== Other ===
- St George Saving a Maiden, marble medallion, 1660, facade of Caccamo Cathedral.
- Altarpiece, marble, Santa Maria Assunta Basilica, Randazzo
- Saint Anne and the Virgin Mary as a Child, marble sculptural group, attributed, Monastery of Santa Maria delle Grazie, Burgio.

== Bibliography ==
- (in Italian) Gaspare Palermo, "Guida istruttiva per potersi conoscere ... tutte le magnificenze ... della Città di Palermo", Volume IV, Palermo, Reale Stamperia, 1816.
