= Pizzolungo =

Italian seaside village

Coordinates: 37.9328°N 12.5481°E

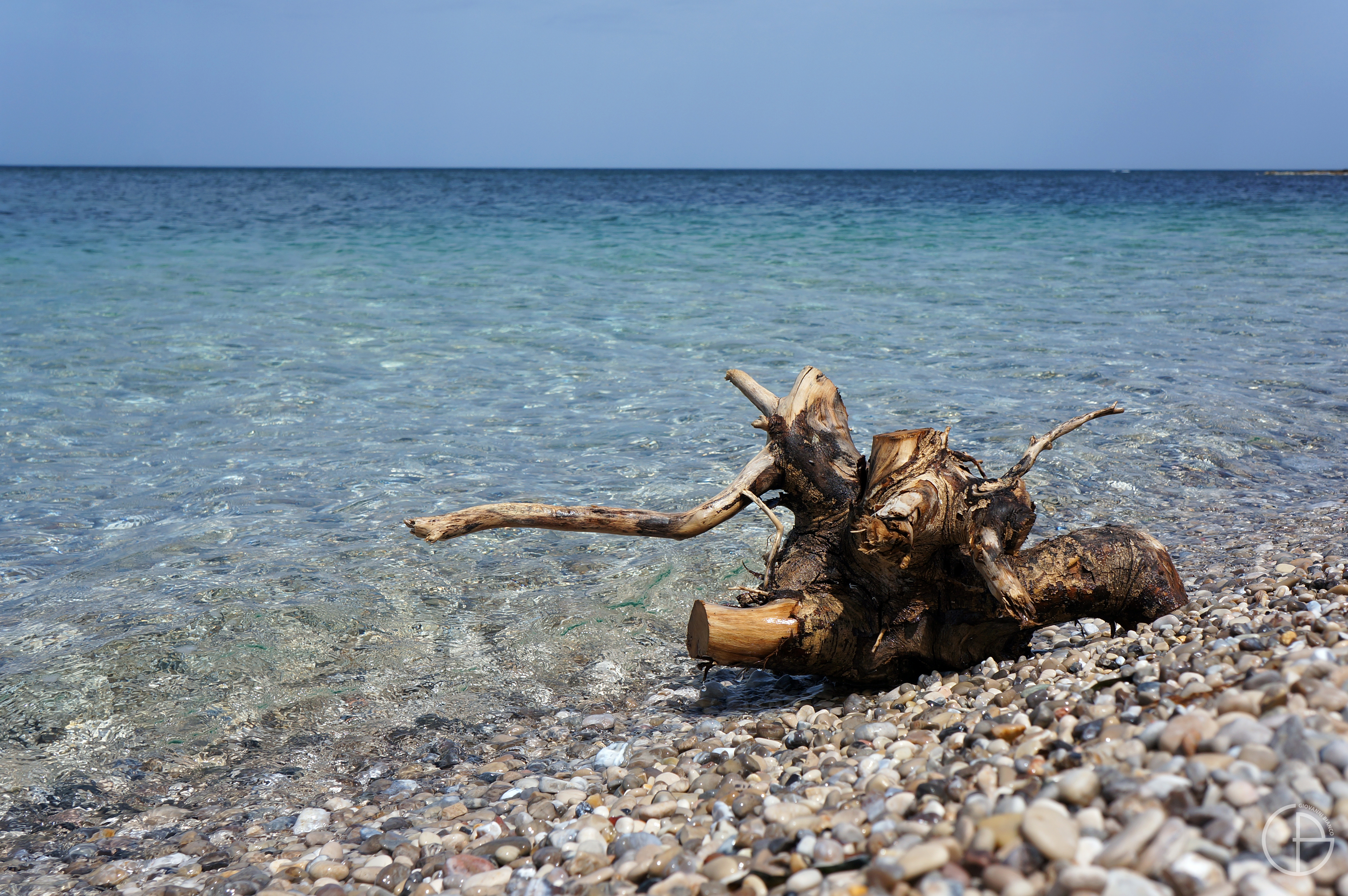
Trunk on the bank of Pizzolungo

Pizzolungo is a small Italian seaside village in western Sicily. It is situated just north of the city of Trapani. Pizzolungo has white, sandy beaches and hills and cliffs surround the coastline, making for a scenic view. It is the ancestral home of the Infante family.
