= Agostino Inveges =

Italian historian

Reverend Agostino Inveges
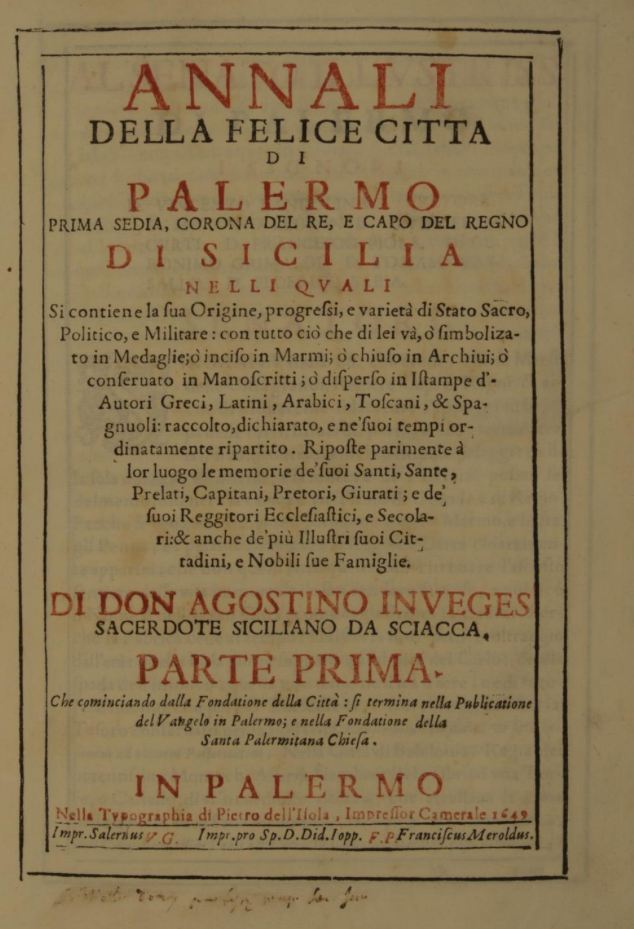
- Frontispiece of Inveges' book
- Born: 1595; Sciacca, Kingdom of Sicily
- Died: April 1677 (aged 81–82); Palermo, Kingdom of Sicily
- Resting place: Sant'Ignazio all'Olivella
- Occupations: Catholic priest, historian
- Known for: Annali della felice Città di Palermo (1649-1651), a three-volume history of Palermo
- Title: abbot

Academic background
- Influences: Tommaso Fazello

Academic work
- Discipline: History of Sicily

Agostino Inveges (1595 – April 1677) was an Italian historian, known as "the Historian of Palermo".

== Life ==
Born in Sciacca, he was the son of Don Mario Inveges (1574-?), and Donna Porzia Marino (1574?-?), both were a part of noble Sicilian families. His maternal grandfather was Barone Giovanni Agostino Marino (1536?-?), Baron of Callisi and Villanova. He first studied with the Jesuits, graduating in theology and philosophy. He died in Palermo in 1677, at the age of 82. He is buried in the Baroque church of Sant'Ignazio all'Olivella, in Palermo.

Inveges is chiefly remembered for his three-volume history of Palermo, Annali della felice Città di Palermo (1649-1651). The three volumes cover the period 2077 B.C. (the foundation of the city) to 1279 A.D.

In opposition to humanist rhetorical historiography, Inveges concluded the preface to the first volume of his huge history of Palermo, caming out against historians who employ “pretty descriptions, capricious metaphors, scheming admonitions, or other ornaments allowed to poets and academicians”. He showed concern for critical, source-based historical research, showing affinities with the new approaches of contemporary historians like the Maurists in Paris and the Bollandists in Antwerp.

== Works ==
- Annali della felice città di Palermo, prima sedia, corona del Re, e Capo del Regno di Sicilia..., Palermo, nella stamparia di Pietro dell'Isola, in 3 voll.: part I, 1649 part II, 1650 part III, 1651
- Historia sacra Paradisi terrestris et sanctissimi innocentiae status, Palermo, 1649 (also including an Italian translation, 1651)
- La Cartagine siciliana, historia divisa in tre libri, Palermo, nella typographia di Giuseppe Bisagni: 1651 edition; 1661 edition
- Annales regni Siciliae

=== Published posthumously ===
- Ad annales Siculos praeliminaris apparatus in quo de Siculae historiae... Panormi: ex typographia Joannis Napoli. 1709.
- Panormus antiqua: sive Urbis felicis [...] & capitis regni Siciliæ, æræ tres, heroica, Carthaginensis, & Romana, in "Thesaurus Antiquitatum et Historiarum Siciliae,... Sardiniae et Corsicae Aliarumque Adjacentium", Volumen Decimun Quartum, sumptibus Petri Vander Aa, 1725
- Carthago sicula... Ex italicis latina fecit... Sigebertus Havercampus, sumptibus P. Van der Aa, 1725
