= Castello di Caccamo =

Castle in Caccamo, Italy

Caccamo Castle
- Castello di Caccamo
- Caccamo, Sicily, Italy
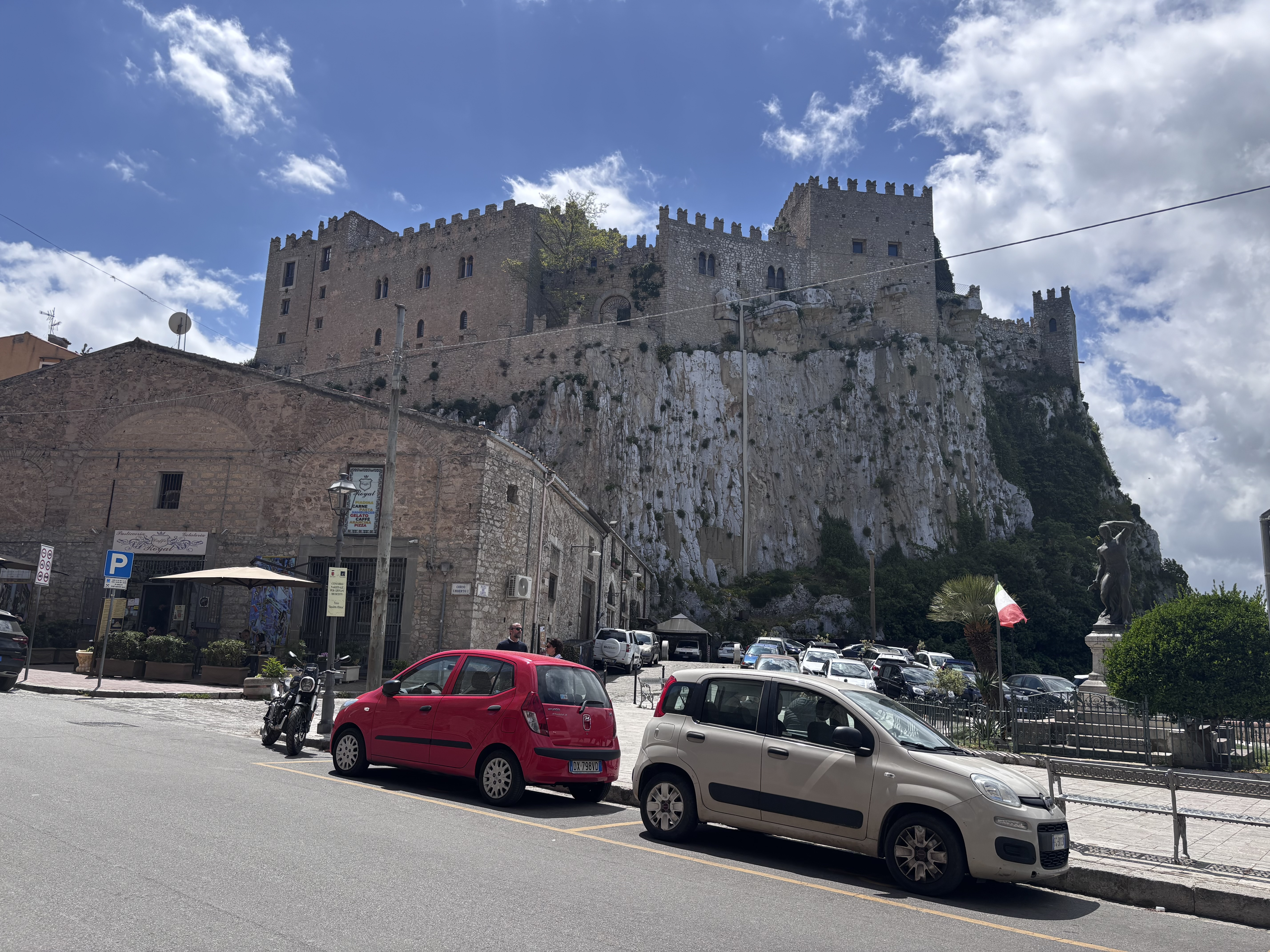
- The castle in 2025

Site information
- Type: Castle
- Owner: Region of Sicily
- Open to the public: Yes
- Condition: Intact

Location
- Coordinates: 37°55′54.4″N 13°39′36.4″E

Site history
- Built: 12th century
- Built by: Matthew Bonnellus
- Materials: Stone
- Events: Barons' Revolt of 1160

The Castello di Caccamo (English: Caccamo Castle) is a castle in Caccamo, Sicily. It is among the largest and best preserved Norman castles in Sicily, and one of the largest in Italy.

The castle is built on a steep cliff, 521 metres above sea level. It overlooks the surrounding countryside, including the San Leonardo River Valley, and the Rosmarina artificial lake.

== History ==
The castle as it is today was built by Matthew Bonnellus in the 12th century. It was later modified by the Chiaramontes in the 14th century, and by other rulers until the 17th century.

The castle is a large structure built of white stone, having an irregular plan. It has walls with V-shaped battlements, towers, a moat and a courtyard. The interior consists of a maze of rooms and stairways.

The most notable room within the castle is the Sala della Congiura, also known as the Conspiracy Hall. In 1160, some Norman barons met in this room to plot against William I of Sicily, but the rebellion failed.

Parts of the castle collapsed in an earthquake in 1923.

The castle was inhabited by descendants of the Dukes of Caccamo until it was purchased by the Region of Sicily in October 1963. By this time, the castle was in ruins. Restoration work funded by the Region of Sicily began in 1974.

== Present day ==
Today, the castle is open to the public. A restaurant called A Castellana is located on the ground level of the castle, while other parts of the structure are also used for conferences and meetings.
