= Trabia =

- Comune
- Comune di Trabia
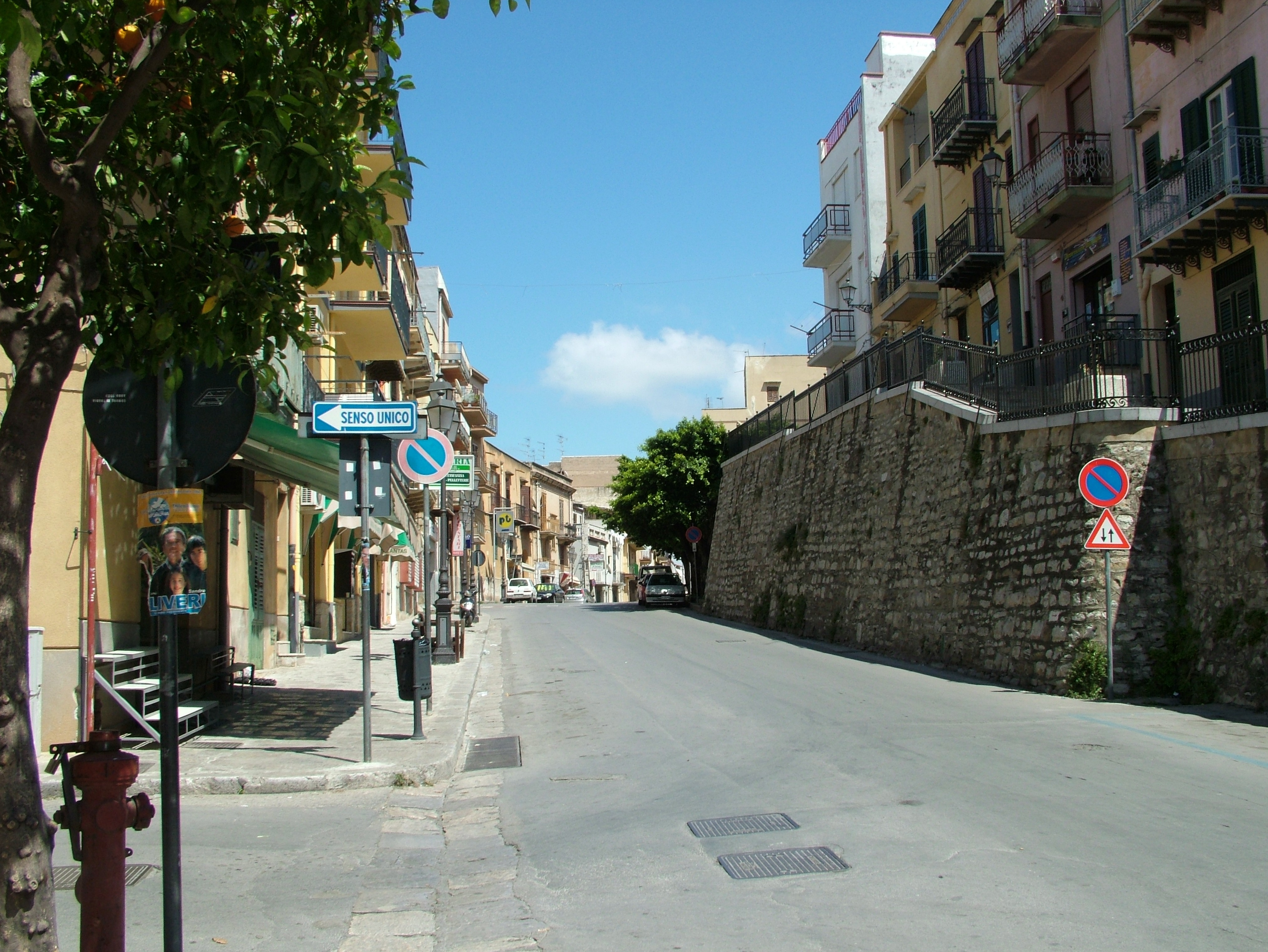

- Location within Italy Location within Sicily
- Coordinates: 38°0′N 13°39′E
- Country: Italy
- Region: Sicily
- Metropolitan city: Palermo (PA)
- Frazioni: San Nicola l'Arena, Sant'Onofrio

Government
  - Mayor: Leonardo Ortolano

Area
  - Total: 20.57 km^{2} (7.94 sq mi)
- Elevation: 50 m (160 ft)

Population (30 November 2015)
  - Total: 10,721
  - Density: 521.2/km^{2} (1,350/sq mi)
- Demonym: Trabiesi
- Time zone: UTC+1 (CET)
  - Summer (DST): UTC+2 (CEST)
- Postal code: 90019
- Dialing code: 091
- Website: Official website

Trabia (Sicilian: 'A Trabbìa) is a comune (municipality) in the Metropolitan City of Palermo in the Italian region Sicily, located about 30 kilometres (19 mi) southeast of Palermo.

Trabia borders the following municipalities: Altavilla Milicia, Caccamo, Casteldaccia, Termini Imerese.
