= Caccamo =

Caccamo Càccamu (Sicilian)
- Comune
- Comune di Caccamo
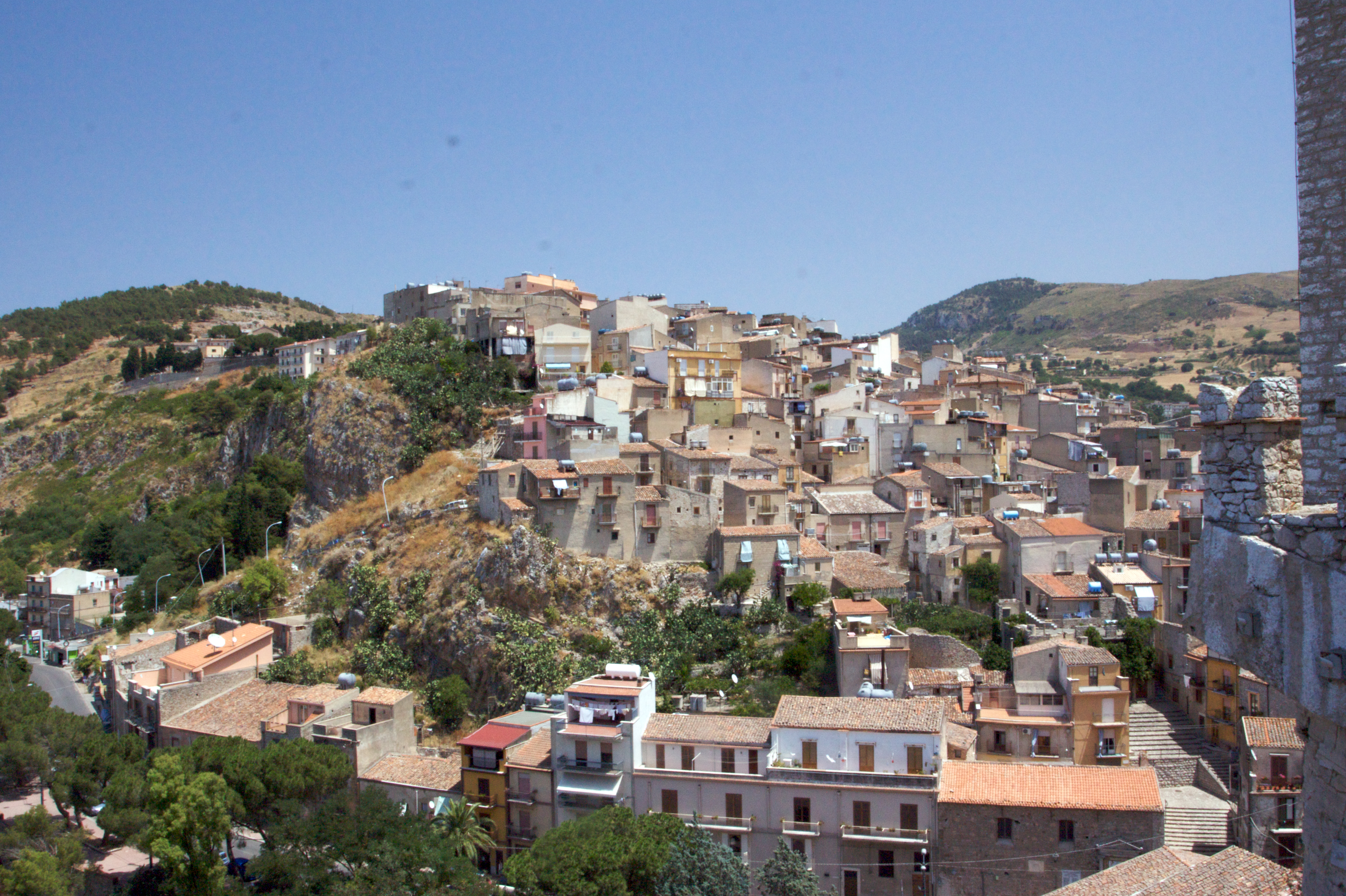

- Location within Italy Location within Sicily
- Coordinates: 37°56′N 13°40′E
- Country: Italy
- Region: Sicily
- Metropolitan city: Palermo (PA)
- Frazioni: San Giovanni Li Greci, Sambuchi

Government
  - Mayor: Franco Fiore

Area
  - Total: 188.23 km^{2} (72.68 sq mi)
- Elevation: 521 m (1,709 ft)

Population (4-30-2017)
  - Total: 8,154
  - Density: 43.32/km^{2} (112.2/sq mi)
- Demonym: Caccamese(i)
- Time zone: UTC+1 (CET)
  - Summer (DST): UTC+2 (CEST)
- Postal code: 90012
- Dialing code: 091
- Patron saint: Saint Nicasius of Sicily
- Website: Official website

Caccamo (Sicilian: Càccamu) is a town and comune located on the Tyrrhenian coast of Sicily in the Metropolitan City of Palermo.

== History ==
The official founding of Caccamo was not until 1093, when the Normans started to build the castle on a rocky spur overlooking a cliff, Castello di Caccamo. The castle itself is actually now being slowly converted into a museum. On the ground level of the castle is a restaurant "A Castellana". Submerged within the Rosamarina lake is a stone bridge built in 1307 on the road that once linked the town with Palermo. The city contains an attractive 11th-century cathedral, which was remodeled in 1477 and 1614. On the side of the cathedral are two churches. The Chiesa dell'Anime del Purgatorio (Church of the Souls of Purgatory) features some stucco work in the eastern end and an 18th-century organ. In the downstairs are catacombs where the skeletons of a number of townspeople lie in niches along the wall, a burial practice that lasted from the 17th century up to 1863.

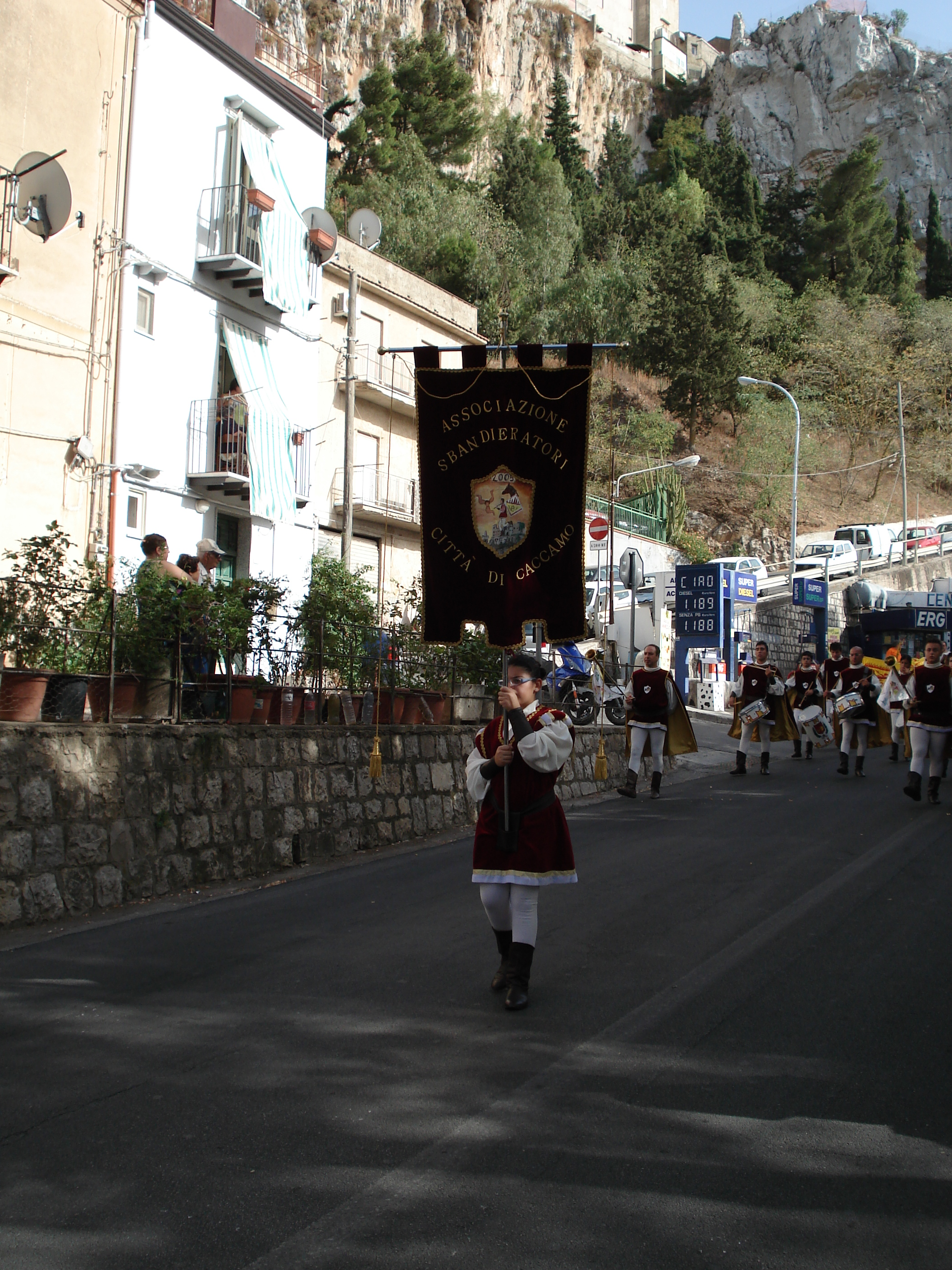
The Festa del Patrono, near the entrance to the Castle of Caccamo

Since the 1950s, the town itself has lost almost half of its inhabitants to emigration. Caccamo holds some great views of the surrounding countryside, including the Rosmarina artificial lake, which was created by a controversial dam built in 1993.

== Notable people from Caccamo ==
- Giovanni "John" Stanfa, Italian-American mobster (former boss of Philadelphia crime family) and uncle of Antonino Giuffrè.
- Antonino "Nino" Giuffrè, Italian mobster (high-ranking member of Corleonesi) and nephew of John Stanfa.
