= Risanamento =

Risanamento (literally, making healthy again) is a name given to the large scale re-planning of Italian cities in the 19th century, following unification. Particular examples are the Risanamento of Florence, and Naples, similar to what Baron Haussmann did to Paris.

The term was also used in the 20th century as a translation of "urban renewal" in Palermo, after parts of the city were destroyed by bombing in World War II.

== See also ==
- History of Italy
