= Timeline of Palermo =

The following is a timeline of the history of the city of Palermo, Sicily, Italy.

== Prehistory ==
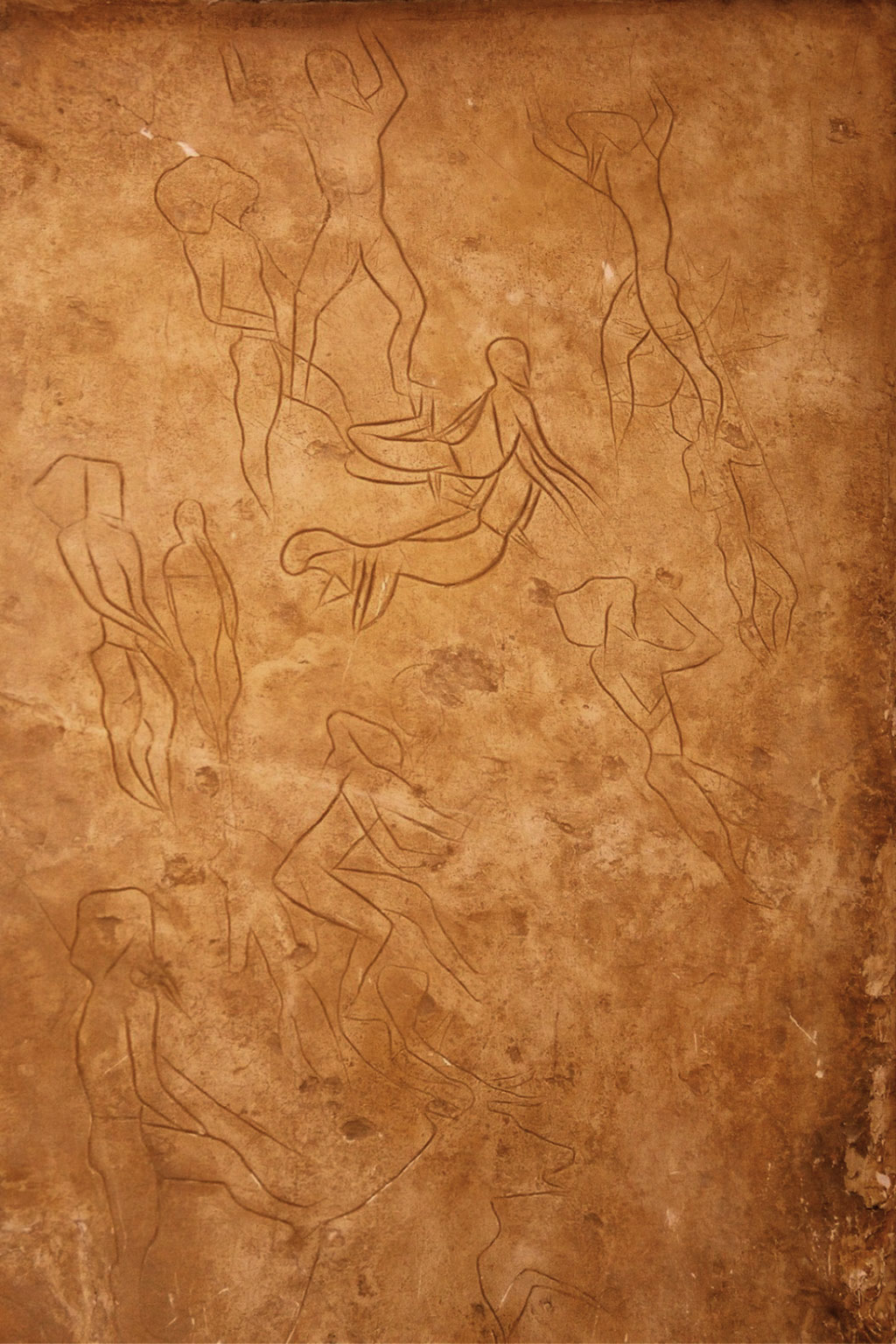
Addaura cave engravings.

- Between 14,000 and 10,000 BC - Human settlements on Monte Pellegrino create the Addaura cave engravings.
- Between the 3rd and 2nd millennium BC - The Sicani settle in the area of present-day Palermo.

== Classical antiquity ==
Burial in the Punic necropolis of Palermo.

- 734 BC - The city is founded by Phoenicians from Tyre. The city's names are initially Mabbonath ("camp") and later Zyz ("flower"). The Paleopolis, the oldest nucleus of the city, develops. The city becomes the most important city of the so-called "Phoenician triangle" of Sicily, which also includes Mozia and Solunto.
- 6th-5th century BC - The city progressively expands, with the construction of the Neapolis and the consequent development of the so-called "Phoenician Foot".
- 5th century BC - Greek-Siceliot cultural influence over the city increases. The name Panormos ("all port") begins to circulate in Punic coinage.
- 480 BC - Palermo becomes involved in the conflict between the Siceliots and the Carthaginians, culminating in the First Battle of Himera.
- 409 BC - An incursion by the armies of the Syracusan general Hermocrates against the city. The assault fails, but around 500 inhabitants are killed. The Second Battle of Himera is fought in the same year.
- 397 BC - The city, allied with Carthage, is sacked by Dionysius I of Syracuse.
- 276 BC - During his campaign against the Carthaginians, Pyrrhus conquers the city.
- 275 BC - Pyrrhus leaves Sicily and Palermo returns to Carthaginian control.
- 264 BC - The First Punic War breaks out between Carthage and Rome. Palermo is a key strategic point militarily.
- 254 BC - Roman victory in the First Battle of Palermo.
- 251 BC - Roman victory in the Second Battle of Palermo, also known as the Battle of Mount Ercta.
- 247 BC - Hamilcar Barca conducts military operations against the Romans from Mount Ercta (Monte Pellegrino).
- 241 BC - End of the First Punic War. Palermo becomes permanently a Roman city.
- 1st century BC - Palermo is granted the status of Civitas libera et immunis by Rome. A Roman colony is established and the city undergoes urban development.
- 1st century AD - According to tradition, the first bishop of Palermo is sent by Saint Peter. Christianity spreads.

Statue of Saint Nympha at the Quattro Canti.

== Late antiquity ==
- 216 - The great physician Galen dies near Palermo; Arab sources attest to his burial at Misilmeri.
- 250 - Saint Agatha takes refuge in Palermo to escape persecution. After being discovered, she is taken back to Catania, where she suffers martyrdom.
- c. 313 - Following the Edict of Milan, the first nucleus of the Palermo Cathedral is erected on the site of a pagan temple in the Neapolis.
- 316 - The martyrdom of the Palermitan Saint Nympha takes place at Portus, near Rome.

== Early Middle Ages ==
Statue of Pope Sergius I outside Palermo Cathedral.

- 440 - The Vandals of Genseric attack Palermo and occupy the city. The Cathedral is destroyed. Bishop Mamilian is exiled to Carthage.
- c. 440-484 - Palermo, like the rest of Sicily, is incorporated into the Vandal Kingdom.
- 463 - On 10 June, the martyrdom of the Palermitan Saint Olivia takes place in Tunis.
- 491 - The city is occupied by the Ostrogoths of Theodoric.
- 535 - Capture of Palermo by the Byzantines led by Belisarius during the Gothic War.
- 590-604 - Reconstruction of Palermo Cathedral in the Byzantine style, dedicated to the Assumption.
- 598 - A letter by Pope Gregory the Great provides the first attestation of Palermo's Jewish community, although its origins appear to be older.
- 678 - The Palermitan bishop Agatho is elected the 79th Pope.
- 687 - The Palermitan bishop Sergius I is elected the 84th Pope.

=== 9th century ===
- 830 - In August, as part of the Muslim conquest of Sicily, the siege of Palermo begins at the hands of the Aghlabid armies.
- 831 - On 11 September, the Byzantine commander Simeon surrenders: the city is conquered by the Muslims. Palermo, called Balarm by the Arabs, becomes the seat of Muslim government and begins to develop into the capital of Sicily, replacing Syracuse. Palermo Cathedral is converted into the Jami Mosque, or Great Friday Mosque.

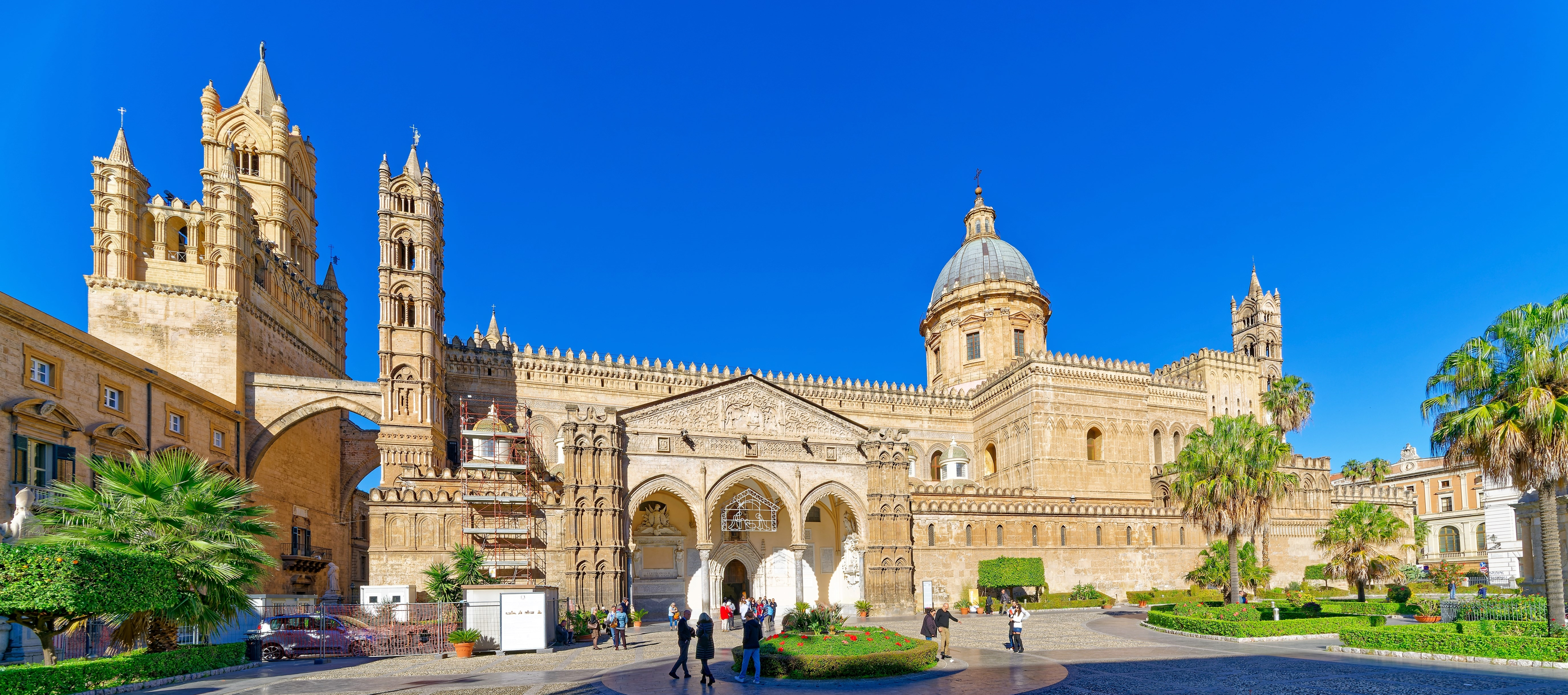
Palermo Cathedral.

- 831-850 - The city's new ethnic composition begins to take shape, with an influx of soldiers, craftsmen and merchants from various parts of the Islamic world (Arabs, Berbers, Persians, etc.), while Christian and Jewish communities continue to exist.
- 869 - The original nucleus of the future Castello di Maredolce and the Parco della Favara is built at the behest of the emir Muhammad ibn Khafaja.
- 878 - Syracuse falls. Palermo is consolidated as the political centre of Sicily. The city continues to grow demographically.

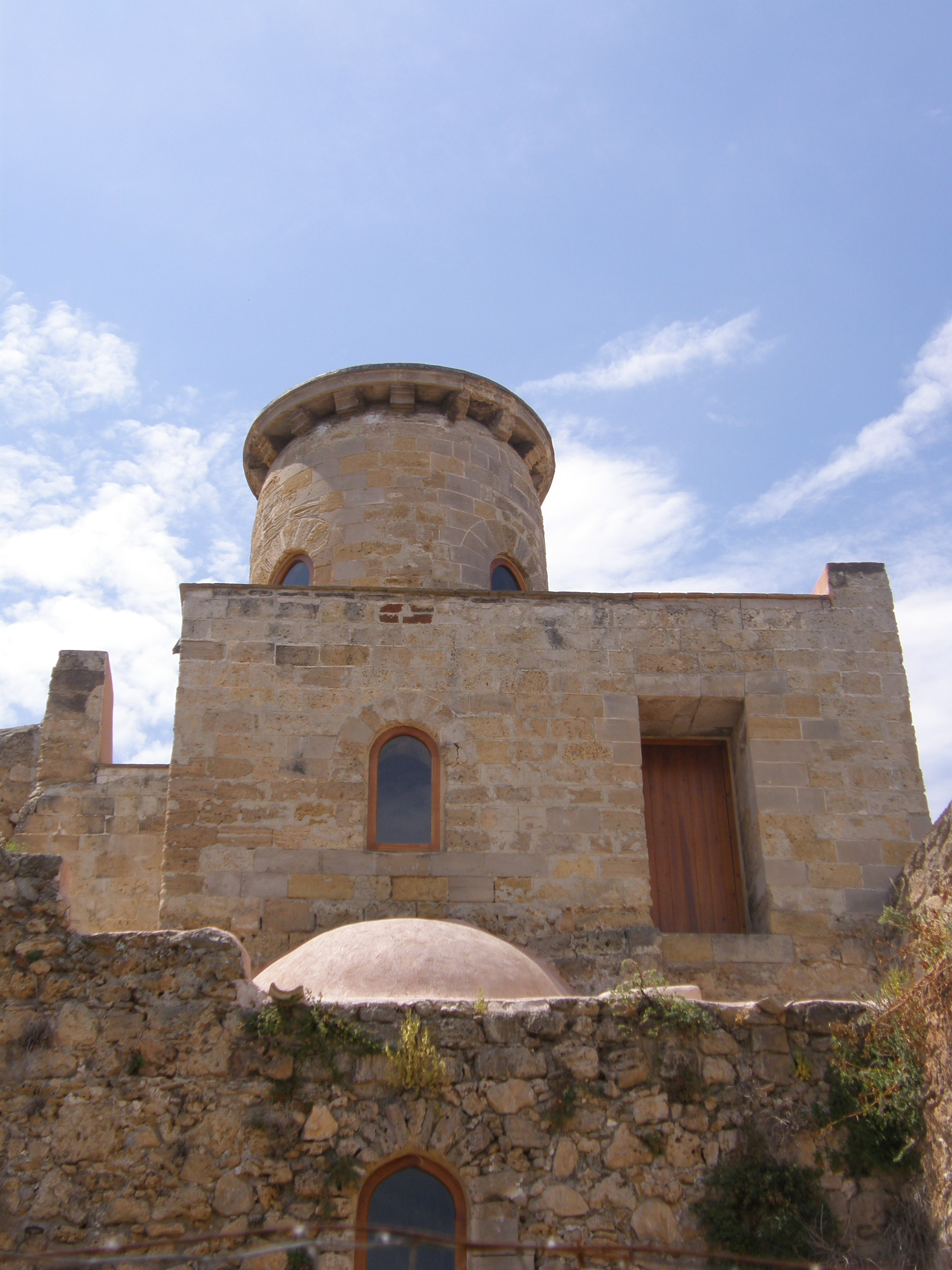
Castello di Maredolce.

=== 10th century ===
- 909 - End of Aghlabid rule. The Fatimids, who follow Shia Islam, seize power in Ifriqiya, and Sicily comes under their authority.
- 934 - The Chronicle of Cambridge reports a major flood in Palermo.
- 937 - Construction begins on the fortified citadel of al-Halisa, present-day Kalsa, promoted by the emir Khalil ibn Ishaq al-Tamimi. The centre of power moves from the ancient al-Qasr to the new citadel.
- 948-1040 - The period of the Kalbid dynasty and the gradual process of independence of the new Emirate of Sicily.
- 973 - The traveller and geographer Ibn Hawqal visits Palermo and describes the city, also called Medina. His account describes a very populous Palermo, divided into several districts and equipped with numerous mosques and commercial establishments. The geographer also mentions a purported tomb of Aristotle in the Jami Mosque.
- 998 - Ja'far al-Kalbi II becomes emir of Sicily. At his initiative, the Castello di Maredolce is built over an earlier structure.

== Late Middle Ages ==
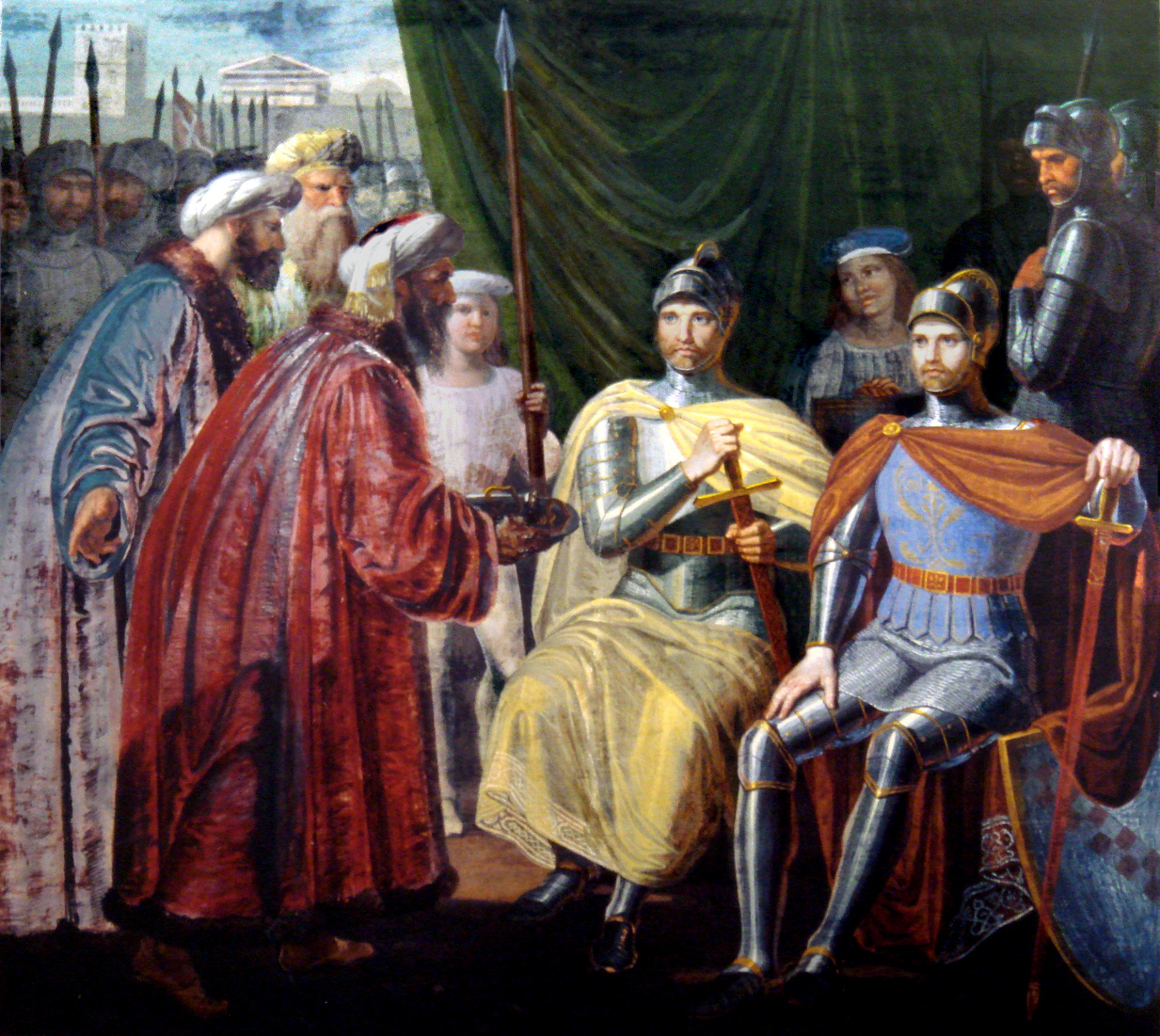
The Delivery of Palermo by the Muslims, painting by Giuseppe Patania, Royal Palace.

=== 11th century ===
- 1050 - Palermo is established as the second most populous city in Western Europe, after Córdoba.
- 1052 - The emir Hasan al-Samsam, the last of the Kalbids, is deposed. Power passes to an oligarchy of notables.
- 1063 - Sack of Palermo by the Pisan fleet. The Cathedral of Pisa is begun with a tenth of the booty.
- 1068 - Norman victory at the Battle of Misilmeri, a few kilometres from the city.
- 1071
  - In August, the Hautevilles begin the siege of Palermo.
  - Construction begins on the Church of San Giovanni dei Lebbrosi, the city's first Arab-Norman building.

San Giovanni dei Lebbrosi, Palermo.

- 1072 - On 10 January, Robert Guiscard and Roger I, the Great Count receive the keys to Palermo. Muslim rule over the city ends. The centre of political power moves from the Kalsa to the Palazzo dei Normanni. The Cathedral, handed over to Bishop Nicodemus, returns to Christian worship.
- 1072-1085 - Palermo is under the jurisdiction of Robert Guiscard until his death. It then passes to his son Roger Borsa.
- 1091 - Roger Borsa cedes jurisdiction over half of Palermo to his uncle Roger the Great Count in exchange for military assistance.

=== 12th century ===
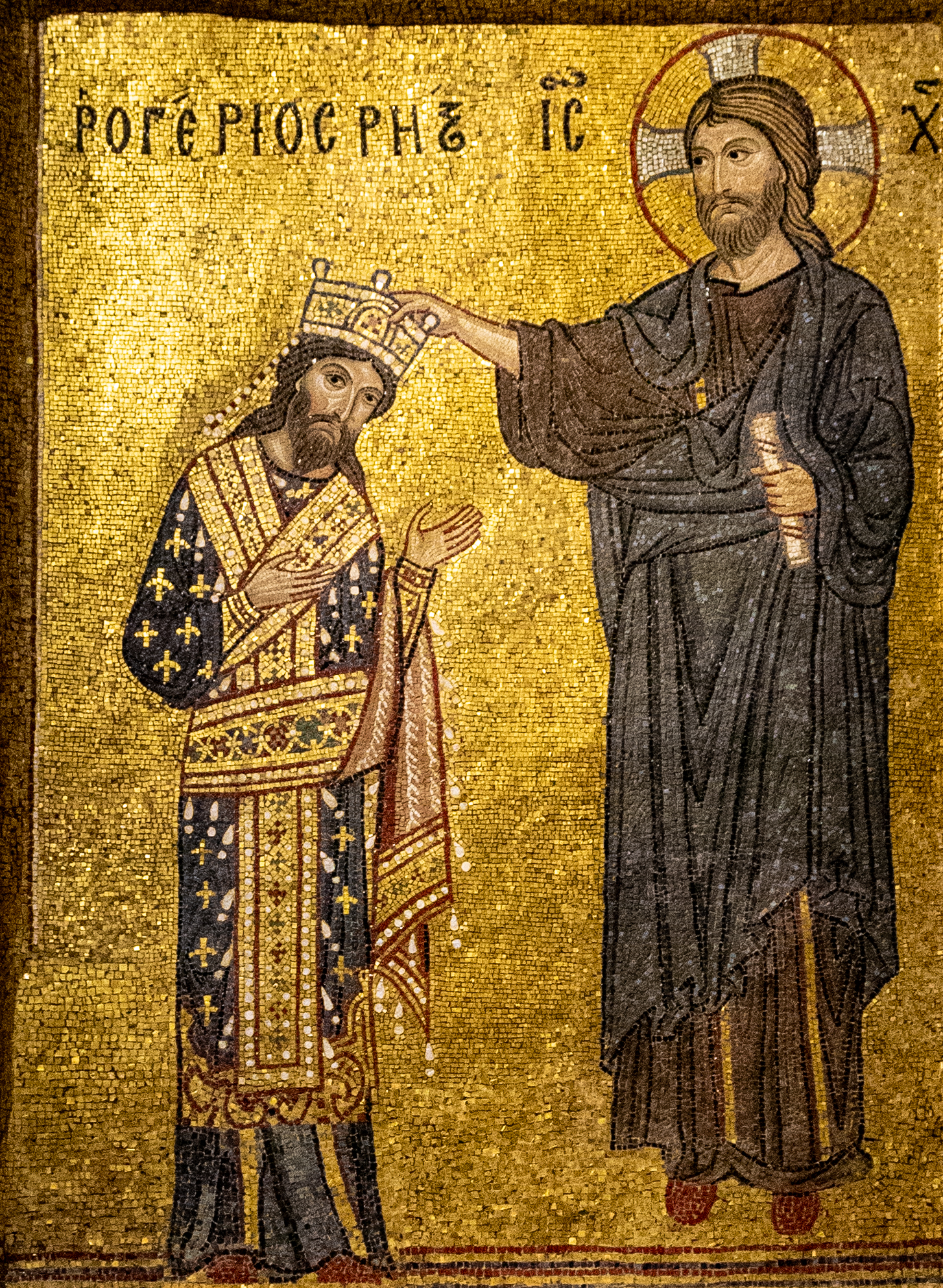
Roger II crowned by Christ, mosaic in the Church of the Martorana.

- 1105 - Following the deaths of his father Roger I and his brother Simon, Roger II of Hauteville becomes Count of Sicily.
- 1109 - King Sigurd I of Norway, as part of the Norwegian Crusade, visits Count Roger II.
- 1112 - Adelaide del Vasto, regent for her son Roger II, designates Palermo as the capital of the County of Sicily.
- 1117 - Marriage between Roger II and Princess Elvira of Castile.
- 1122 - Roger II obtains from his cousin William II of Apulia jurisdiction over the remaining half of Palermo held by the heirs of Guiscard.
- 1130
  - Foundation of the Kingdom of Sicily and the Sicilian Parliament.
  - 25 December - Coronation of Roger II of Hauteville at Palermo Cathedral with the titles of Rex Siciliae, ducatus Apuliae et principatus Capuae.
  - Palermo acquires the titles of Prima Sedes, Corona Regis et Regni Caput.
  - Birth of Saint Rosalia, according to tradition in the Olivella district.
- 1131 - Completion of the Admiral's Bridge at the behest of George of Antioch.
- 1132 - Construction begins on the Church of San Giovanni degli Eremiti at the behest of Roger II.
- 1133-1134 - The famous Coronation Mantle of Roger II is produced at the Nobiles Officinae.

Interior of the Palatine Chapel.

- 1140
  - Roger II establishes the Magna Curia, based at the Royal Palace.
  - 28 April - Consecration of the Palatine Chapel, commissioned by Roger II.
- 1143 - Construction begins on the Church of the Martorana at the initiative of Admiral George of Antioch.
- c. 1150 - Foundation of the Great Synagogue of Palermo in the Giudecca.
- 1154
  - Commissioned by Roger II, the Muslim geographer Muhammad al-Idrisi compiles the Tabula Rogeriana.
  - 26 February - Roger II dies in Palermo and is buried in the Cathedral. His son William I the Bad is crowned.
  - 2 November - Constance of Hauteville, posthumous daughter of Roger II of Sicily, is born in Palermo.
  - Construction begins on the Church of San Cataldo at the initiative of Admiral Maio of Bari.
- 1160 - On 10 November, Admiral Maio of Bari is killed by Matthew Bonellus.
- 1161 - Matthew Bonellus conspires against King William I and attacks the Royal Palace.

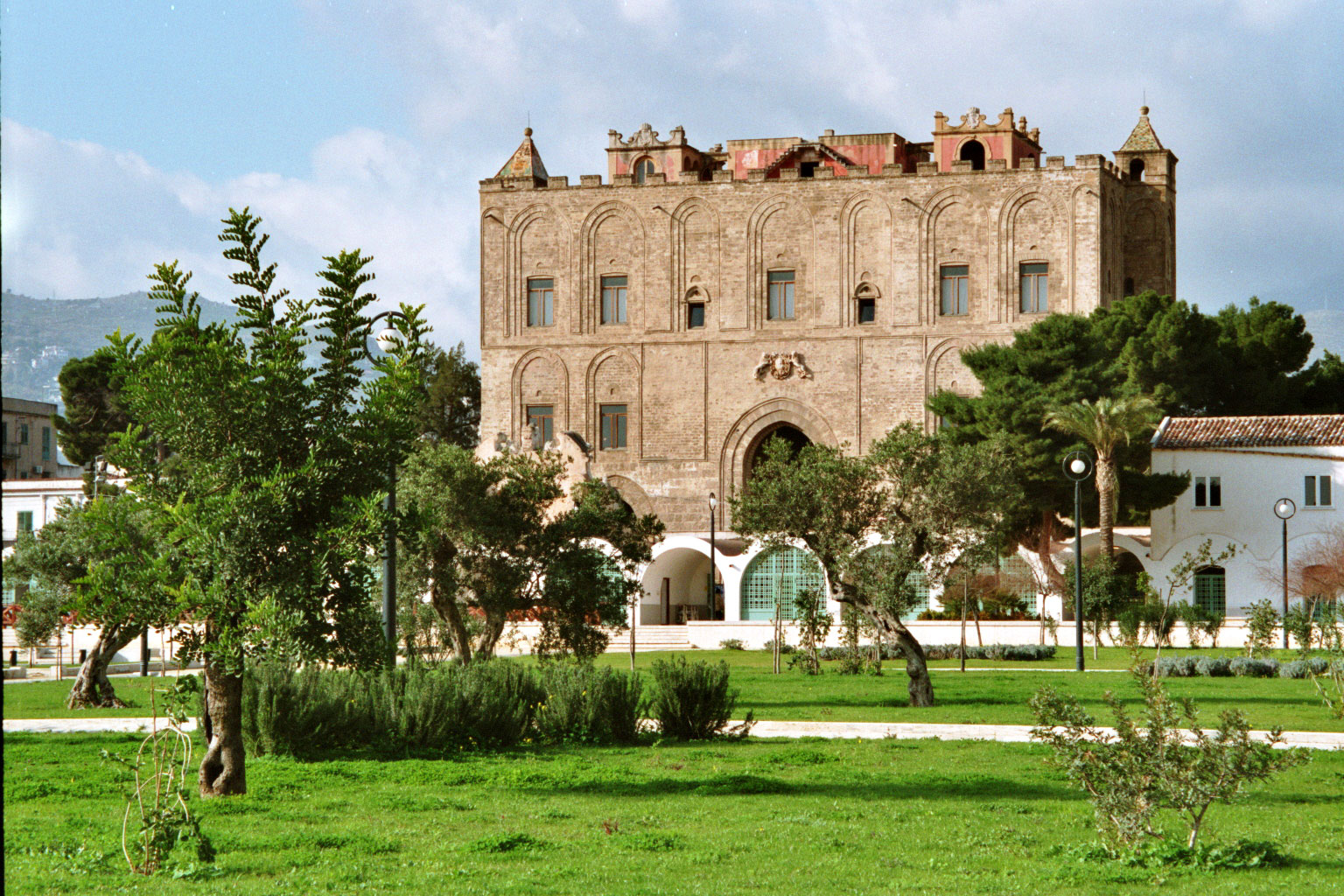
Zisa Palace.

- 1162 - Henry Aristippus dies in Palermo; he was among the first translators of the works of Ptolemy, Plato and Aristotle from Greek into Latin.
- 1165 - Construction begins on the royal residence of Zisa Palace.
- 1166 - William I dies in Palermo. His son William II is crowned in the Cathedral under the regency of his mother Margaret of Navarre.
- 1169 - The powerful earthquake of Saint Agatha is felt in Palermo as well.
- 1170 - On 4 September, the hermit and future patron saint of the city, Saint Rosalia, dies on Mount Pellegrino.
- 1172 - Construction begins on Monreale Cathedral, just outside Palermo, at the behest of William II.
- 1177 - The marriage of William II and Joan of England is celebrated at the Palatine Chapel.

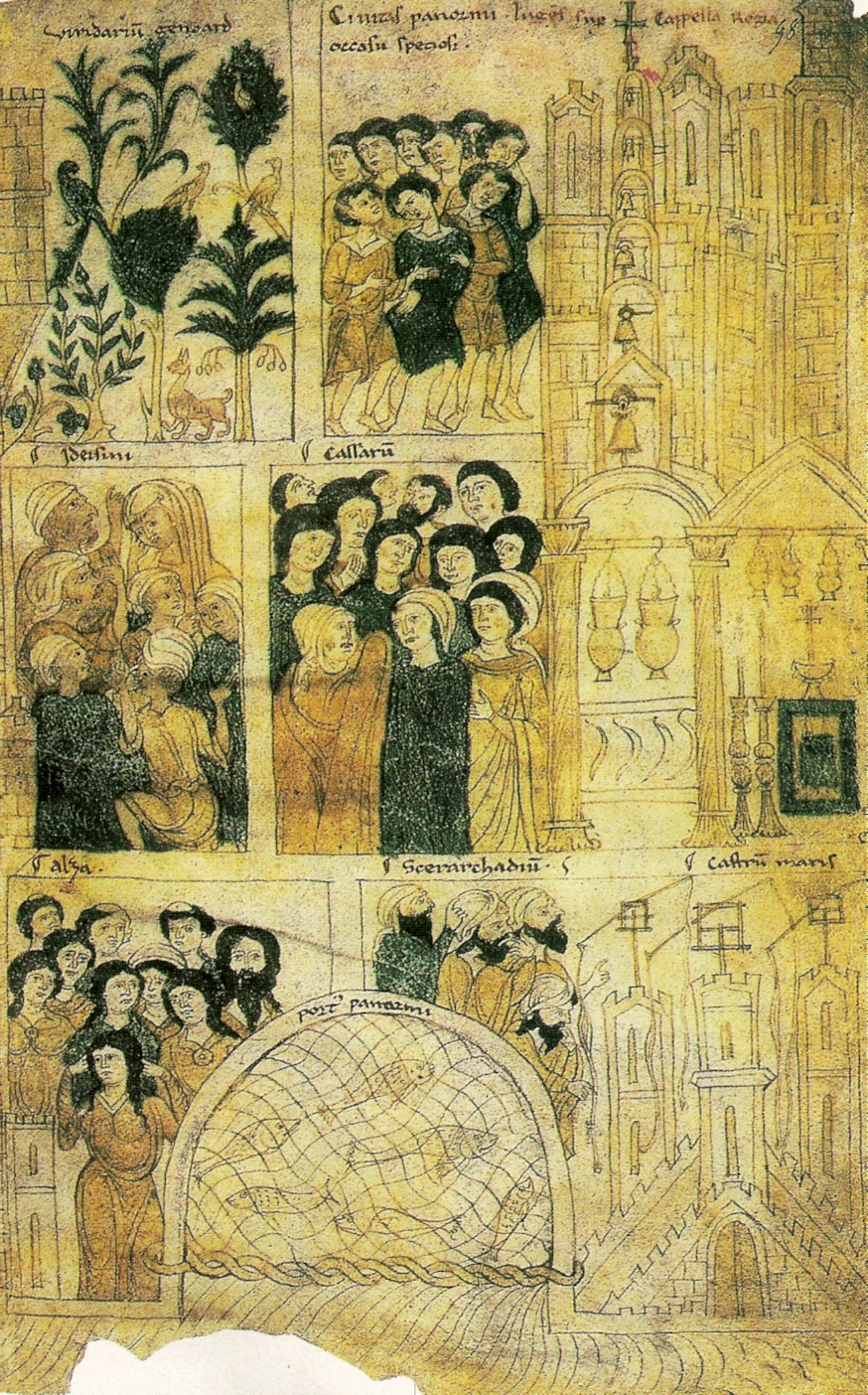
Palermo mourns the death of William II, Liber ad honorem Augusti (1196).

- 1180 - Construction begins on the royal residence of Cuba Palace.
- 1184 - The Arab-Andalusian traveller Ibn Jubayr visits Palermo.
- 1185 - At the initiative of Archbishop Walter, reconstruction of Palermo Cathedral begins after the damage caused by the 1169 earthquake.
- 1186 - Marriage in Milan between Henry VI of Swabia and Constance of Hauteville, future consort of the Holy Roman Empire.
- 1189 - King William II the Good dies childless in Palermo. He is buried in Monreale Cathedral.
- 1190 - The Sicilian Parliament elects Tancred of Hauteville as king, crowned in Palermo Cathedral.
- 1191 - Construction of the Basilica of the Holy Trinity, the last Arab-Norman building in the city, begins at the initiative of the Chancellor Matthew of Ajello.
- 1194
  - 20 February - King Tancred dies in Palermo and is buried in the Basilica of the Holy Trinity. He is succeeded by his son William III under the regency of his mother Sibylla of Acerra.
  - 20 November - Henry VI of Swabia marches on Palermo and takes the crown, deposing William III.
  - 26 December - In Jesi, while travelling to Palermo, Constance of Hauteville gives birth to Frederick II.

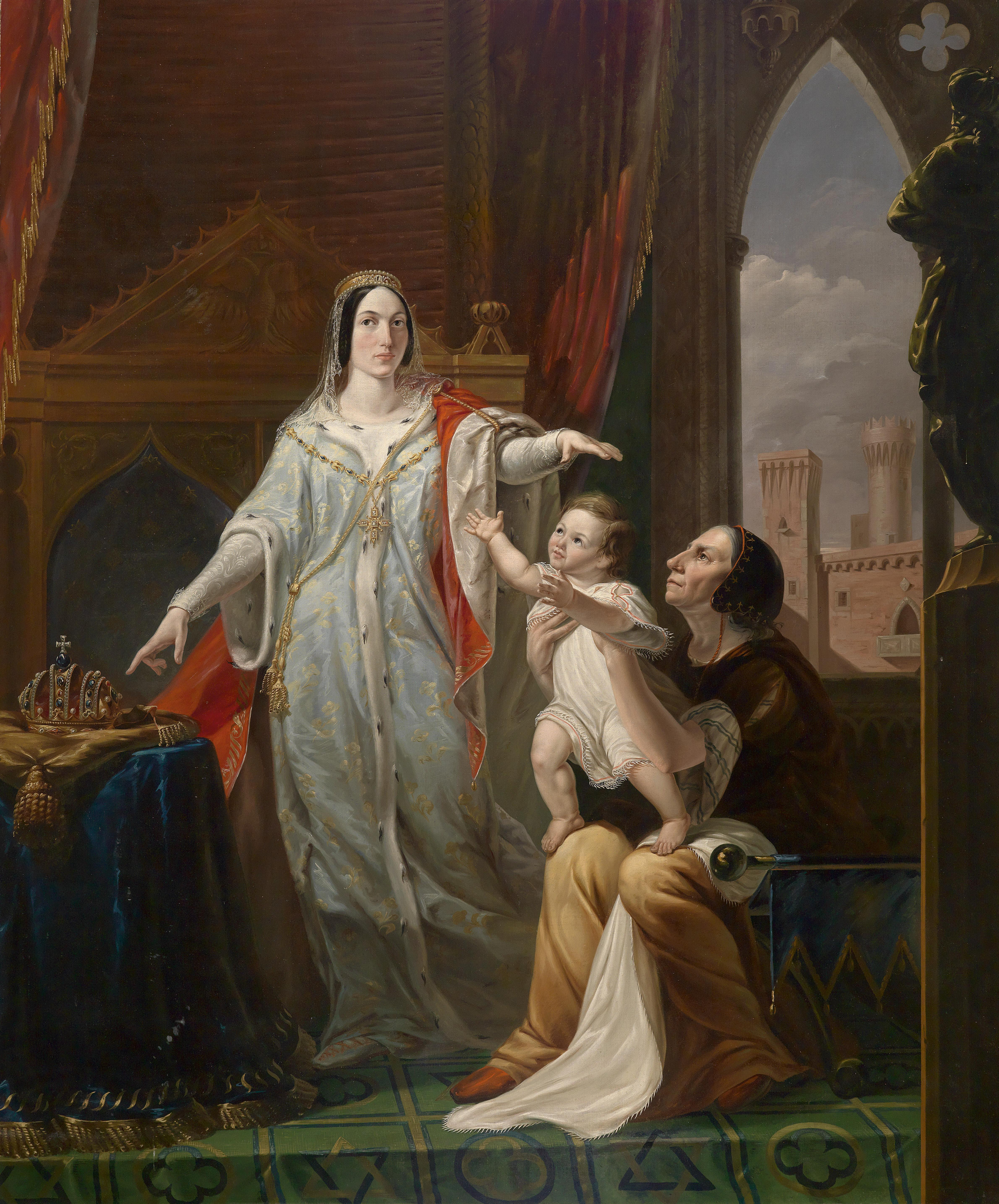
The Royal Destiny of Frederick II of Swabia as an Infant, painting by Pelagio Palagi.

- 1197 - Henry VI dies and is buried in the Cathedral. Constance of Hauteville becomes regent for her son Frederick.
- 1198
  - 18 May - Coronation of the young Frederick in Palermo Cathedral.
  - 27 November - Constance of Hauteville dies in Palermo and is buried in the Cathedral. Frederick is placed under the guardianship of Pope Innocent III.

=== 13th century ===
- 1200 – Between the end of the 12th and the beginning of the 13th century, Palermo is the most populous city in Western Europe.
- 1201–1206 – Regencies of Markward von Annweiler and William of Capparone.
- 1209 – Marriage in Palermo between Frederick II and Constance of Aragon.
- 1220 – Frederick II is crowned in Rome as Holy Roman Emperor. Palermo is de facto the imperial capital.
- 1222–1233 – Suppression of the Muslim rebels and deportation to the colony of Lucera.

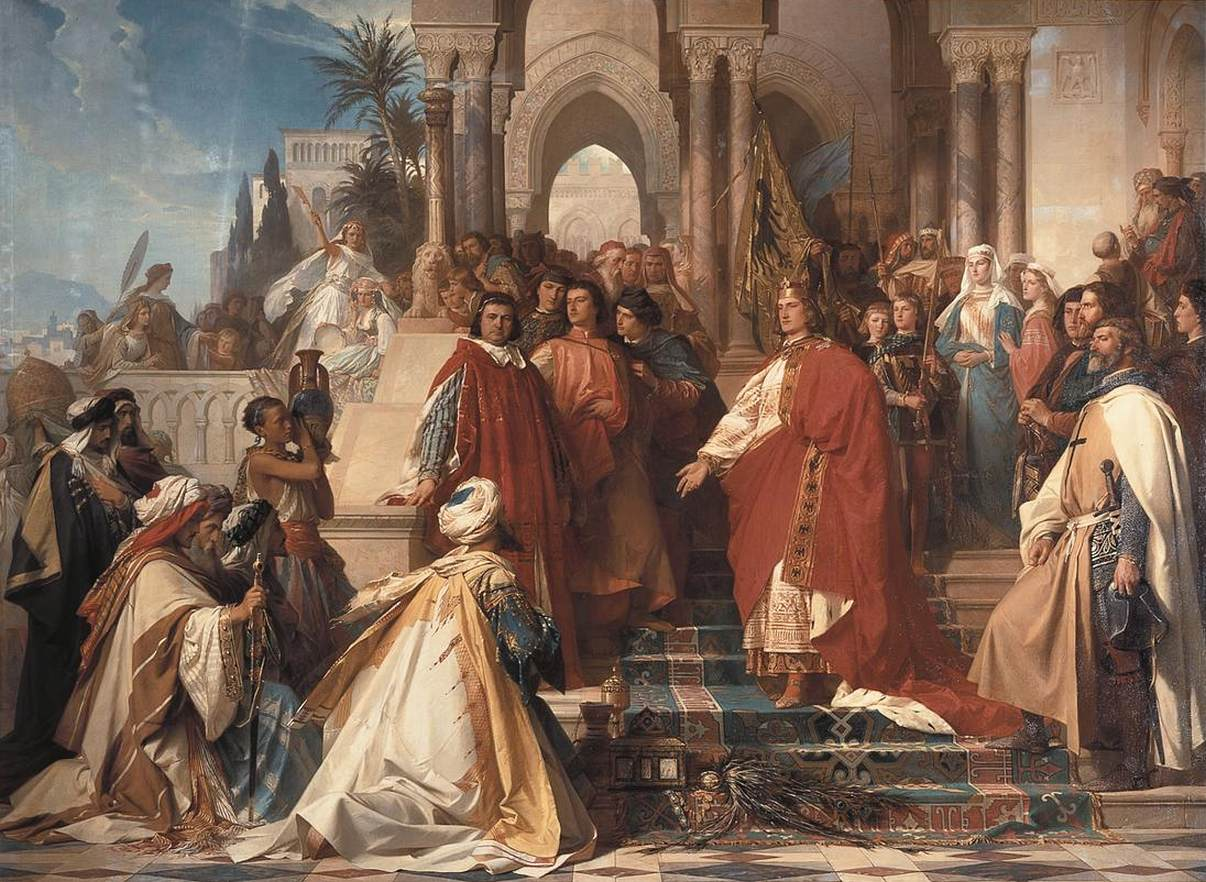
The Court of Emperor Frederick II in Palermo, painting by Arthur von Ramberg.

- c. 1230 – At his itinerant court, Frederick II establishes the Sicilian School of poetry.
- 1250 – Frederick II dies at Fiorentino di Puglia. He is succeeded by his son Conrad.
- 1251 – On 25 February, Frederick II is buried in Palermo Cathedral.
- 1255 – Construction begins on the Basilica of Saint Francis of Assisi.
- 1258 – On 10 August, Manfred of Sicily, son of Frederick II, is crowned in Palermo Cathedral.
- 1266 – King Manfred dies at the Battle of Benevento against the Angevins. The Kingdom of Sicily passes to Charles I of Anjou, who moves the capital from Palermo to Naples.

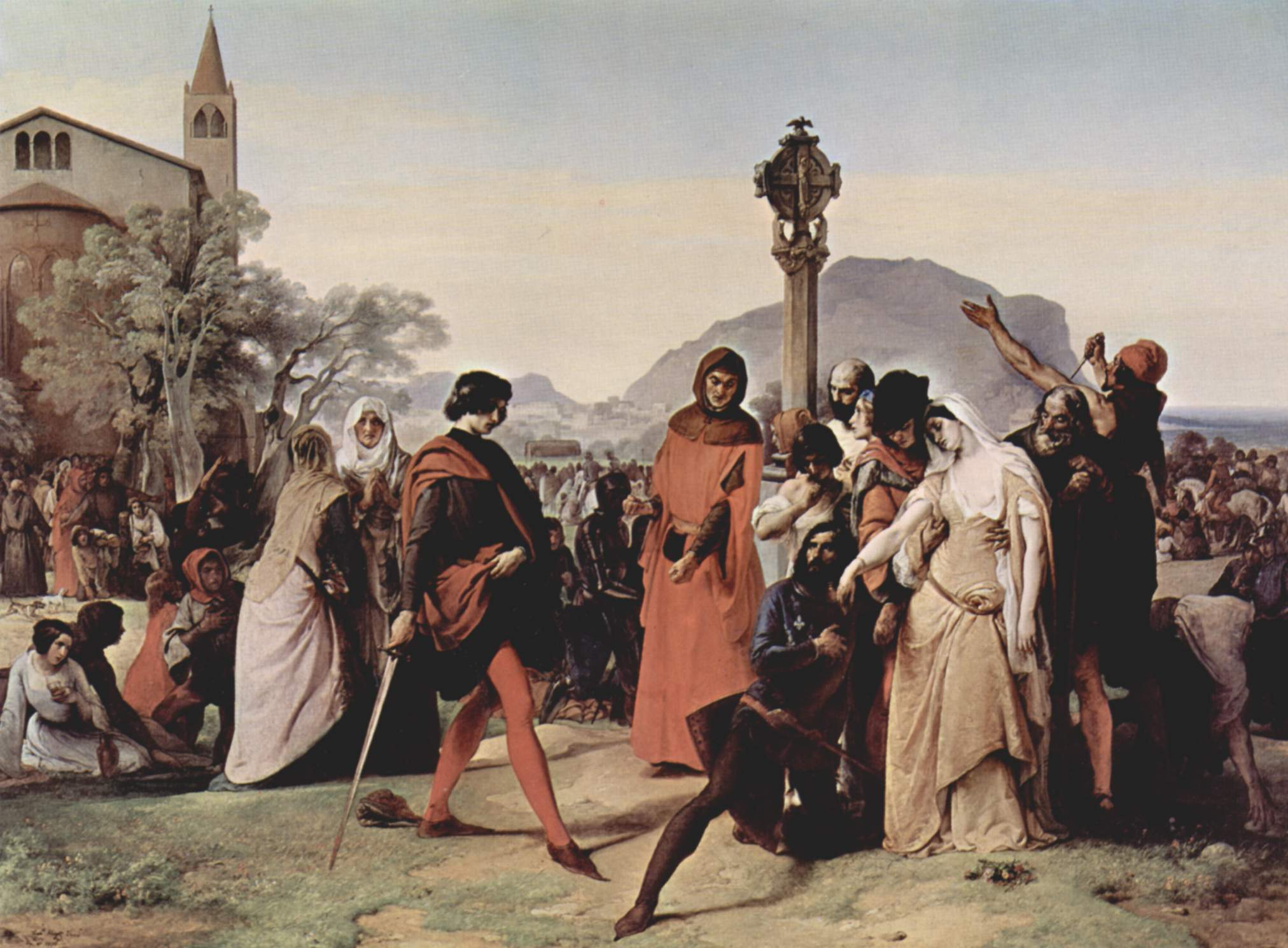
The Sicilian Vespers, painting by Francesco Hayez.

- 1282
  - 30 March–31 March – The Sicilian Vespers revolution against the rule of Charles of Anjou breaks out in the churchyard of the Church of the Holy Spirit.
  - Establishment of the short-lived Communitas Siciliae.
  - 1 September – The Parliament meeting at the Church of the Martorana calls Peter III of Aragon and his wife Constance II of Sicily, daughter of King Manfred, to the throne.
  - 4 September – Peter III makes a triumphal entry into Palermo. He is subsequently crowned at Palermo Cathedral.
- 1286 – Following the death of Peter III, his son James II is crowned King of Sicily in Palermo Cathedral.
- 1296 – After being elected by the Parliament in Catania on 25 March, Frederick III of Sicily is crowned at Palermo Cathedral.

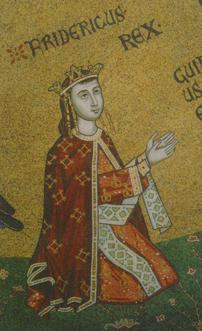
Frederick III of Sicily.

=== 14th century ===
- 1302 – The Peace of Caltabellotta formalizes the division of Sicily from the Angevin dominions.
- 1307 – Inauguration of the Palazzo Chiaramonte-Steri, commissioned by Manfredi I Chiaramonte.
- 1325 – Angevin siege led by Charles, Duke of Calabria. The city resists under the leadership of Giovanni I Chiaramonte.
- c. 1330 – Rivalry begins between the two political factions of the Latins and the Catalans.
- 1337 – King Frederick III dies at Paternò. Peter II is crowned in Palermo Cathedral.
- 1339–1340 – A severe famine strikes the city, causing unrest and looting in the Kalsa.
- 1342 – King Peter II dies at Calascibetta and is buried in Palermo Cathedral, where his son Louis is crowned.

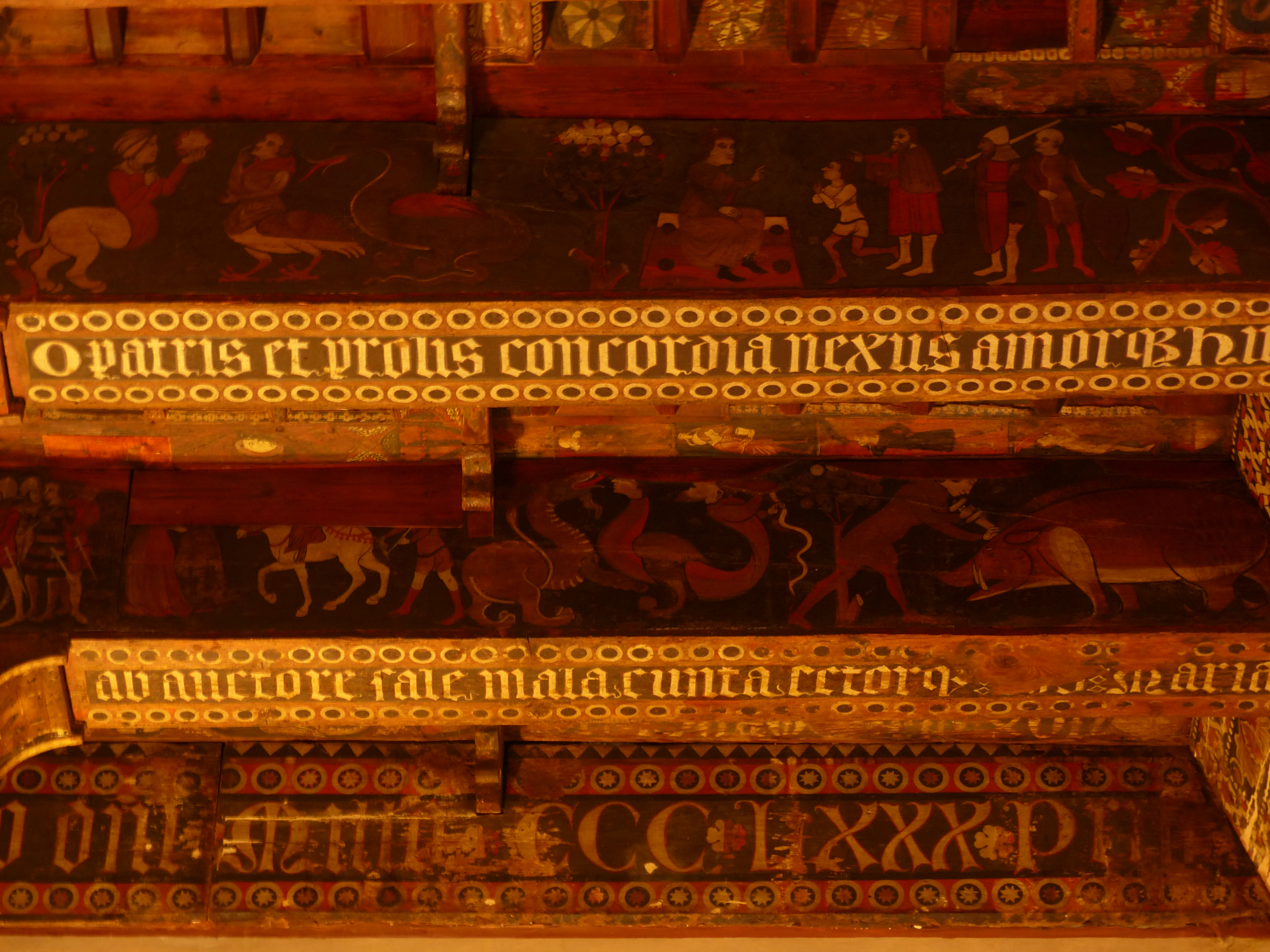
Wooden ceiling of the Palazzo Chiaramonte-Steri.

- 1348–1349 – Palermo is struck by the Black Death. The population is decimated.
- 1351–1352 – Civic revolt led by Lorenzo Murra.
- 1355 – King Louis dies at Aci Castello. Frederick IV is crowned in Palermo.
- 1364 – Manfredi III Chiaramonte becomes admiral of the Kingdom. The political power of the Chiaramonte family grows in Palermo and Sicily.
- 1372 – The Treaty of Avignon ends the ninety-year war between Sicily and Naples.
- 1377 – King Frederick IV dies at Lentini. He is succeeded by his daughter Maria, with the assistance of the Government of the Four Vicars, belonging to the Chiaramonte, Alagona, Peralta and Ventimiglia families.
- 1392
  - Aragonese siege against the Chiaramonte family.
  - Coronation of Martin the Younger and Maria of Sicily in Palermo Cathedral.
  - 1 June – Andrea Chiaramonte is executed in front of the Steri. The Chiaramonte era comes to an end.

=== 15th century ===
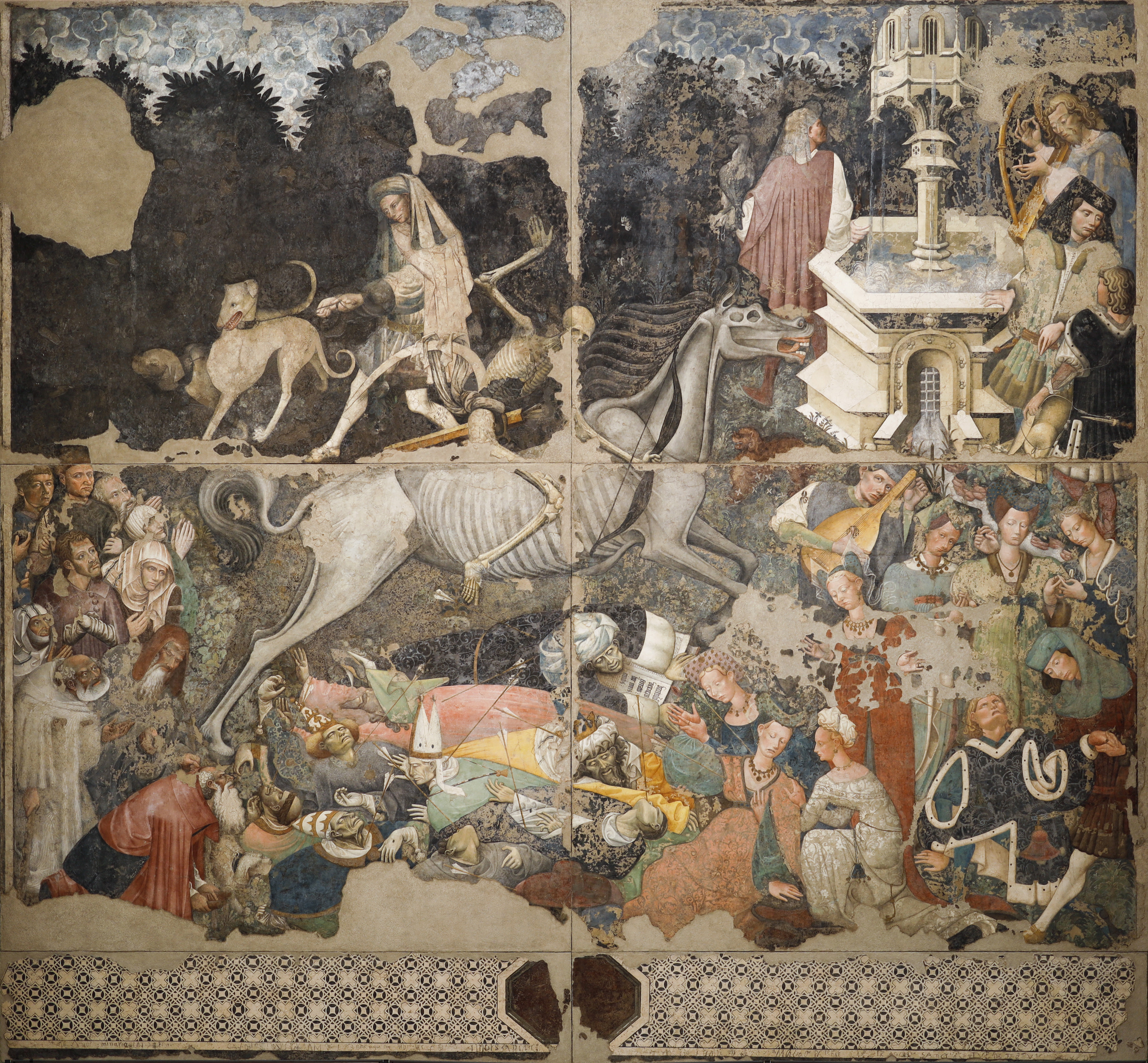
The Triumph of Death, Palazzo Abatellis.

- 1401 – Queen Maria of Sicily dies in Lentini. The Aragonese dynasty of Sicily becomes extinct.
- 1409 – With the death of Martin I, the Kingdom of Sicily enters into a personal union with the Crown of Aragon.
- 1412 – With the Compromise of Caspe, the era of the Viceroys of Sicily, based in Palermo, begins.
- 1429 – Foundation of the Ospedale Grande e Nuovo at Palazzo Sclafani.
- 1446 – The fresco The Triumph of Death is created by an anonymous artist.
- 1450 – Popular unrest during the reign of Alfonso the Magnanimous.
- 1463 – Reconstruction work begins on the Palazzo Pretorio, seat of the city government.
- 1475 – Antonello da Messina creates the Annunciata of Palermo.
- 1476 – The Senate of Palermo hires the itinerant German printer Andrea Vyel to introduce movable-type printing.
- 1478 – The Consuetudines Felicis Urbis Panhormi becomes the first book printed in Sicily.
- 1487 – Ferdinand the Catholic introduces the Inquisition in Sicily.
- 1492–1493 – The Giudecca of Palermo is abandoned by Palermo's Jews following the expulsion decree from the Kingdom of Sicily.

Statue of Charles V.

== Early modern period ==
=== 16th century ===
- 1516 – The 1516 revolt against Viceroy Hugo of Moncada breaks out.
- 1517 – Revolt led by Giovan Luca Squarcialupo.
- 1523 – Imperatore brothers' conspiracy.
- 1535 – Charles V, Holy Roman Emperor visits Palermo following the conquest of Tunis.
- 1553 – The seat of the Inquisition Tribunal is transferred to the Castello a Mare.
- 1554 – First diversion and burial of the Kemonia river.
- 1557 – The flood of 27 September causes thousands of deaths.
- 1560–1562 – Bread revolt led by the notary Cataldo Tarsino.
- 1564 – Construction begins on the Church of the Gesù.
- 1566 – Construction begins on the Church of Santa Caterina.

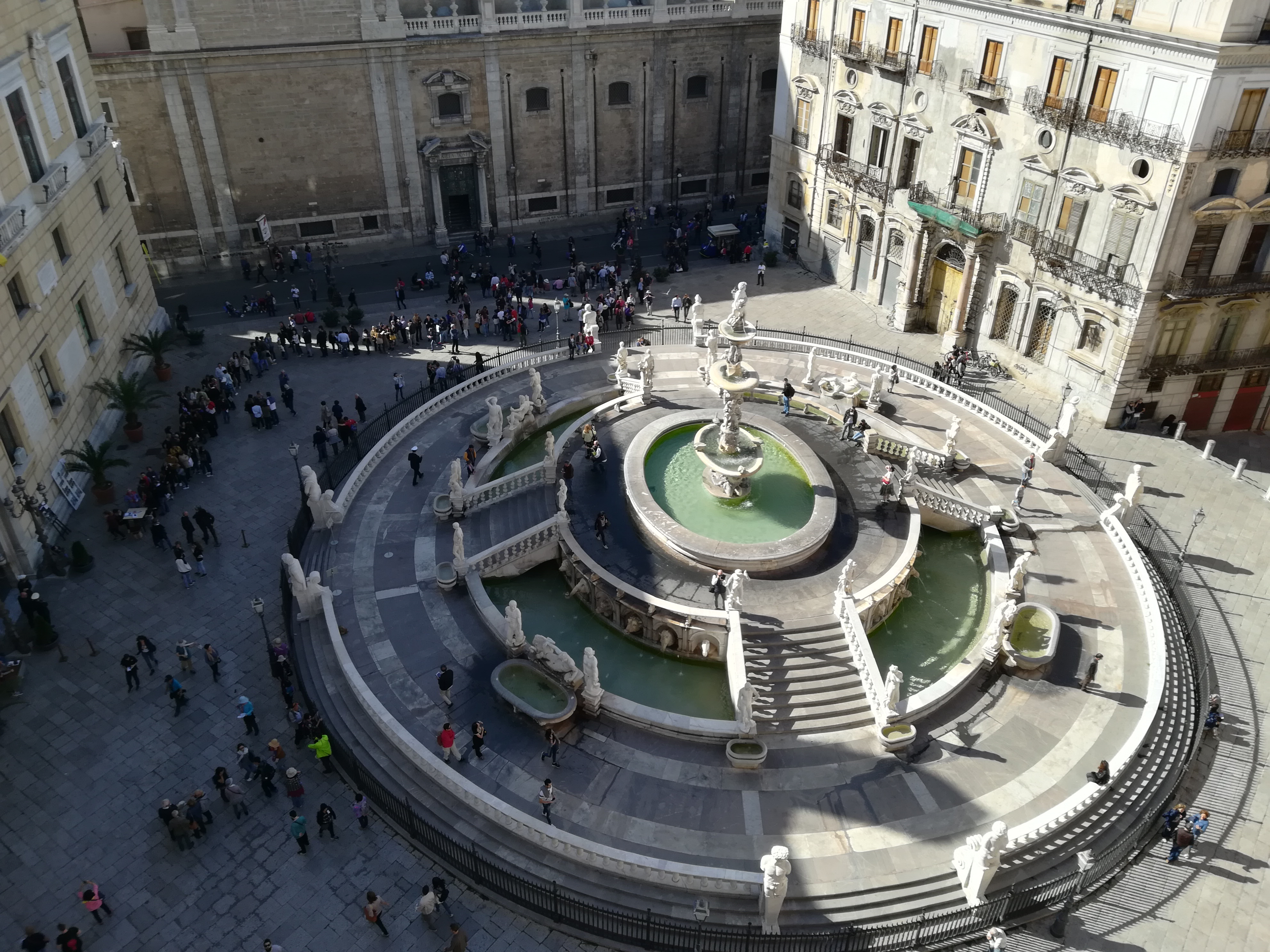
Fontana Pretoria.

- 1567
  - Lengthening of the Cassaro towards the sea begins.
  - Construction begins on the New Pier of Palermo.
- 1568 – Reclamation, canalization and burial works on the Papireto river begin.
- 1573 – The Senate of Palermo purchases the Fontana Pretoria from Florence.
- 1575 – A severe plague epidemic strikes Palermo, causing approximately 3,000 deaths.
- 1582 – Construction begins on Porta Felice and the Strada Colonna, today's Foro Italico.
- 1590 – The sculpture of the Genius of the Port, the oldest known depiction of the Genius of Palermo, of unknown date, is placed at the entrance of the new city port.
- 1593 – On 19 August, an explosion at the Castello a Mare causes the death of poet Antonio Veneziano.

The Quattro Canti.

=== 17th century ===
- 1600 – Opening of the Strada Nuova, today's Via Maqueda.
- 1601 – The seat of the Inquisition Tribunal is transferred to the Steri.
- 1609 – Work begins on the Quattro Canti.
- 1612 – Construction begins on the Church of San Giuseppe dei Teatini.
- 1617 – Foundation of the Palermo Conservatory.
- 1621 – Foundation of the Academy of Anatomy.
- 1624
  - 7 May – The Palermo plague of 1624–1625 begins, causing approximately 10,000 deaths.
  - The relics of Saint Rosalia are discovered on Monte Pellegrino, and she becomes the new patron saint of the city. The Festino is established. The Flemish painter Anthony van Dyck, stranded in Palermo because of the quarantine, creates numerous paintings dedicated to the Santuzza.

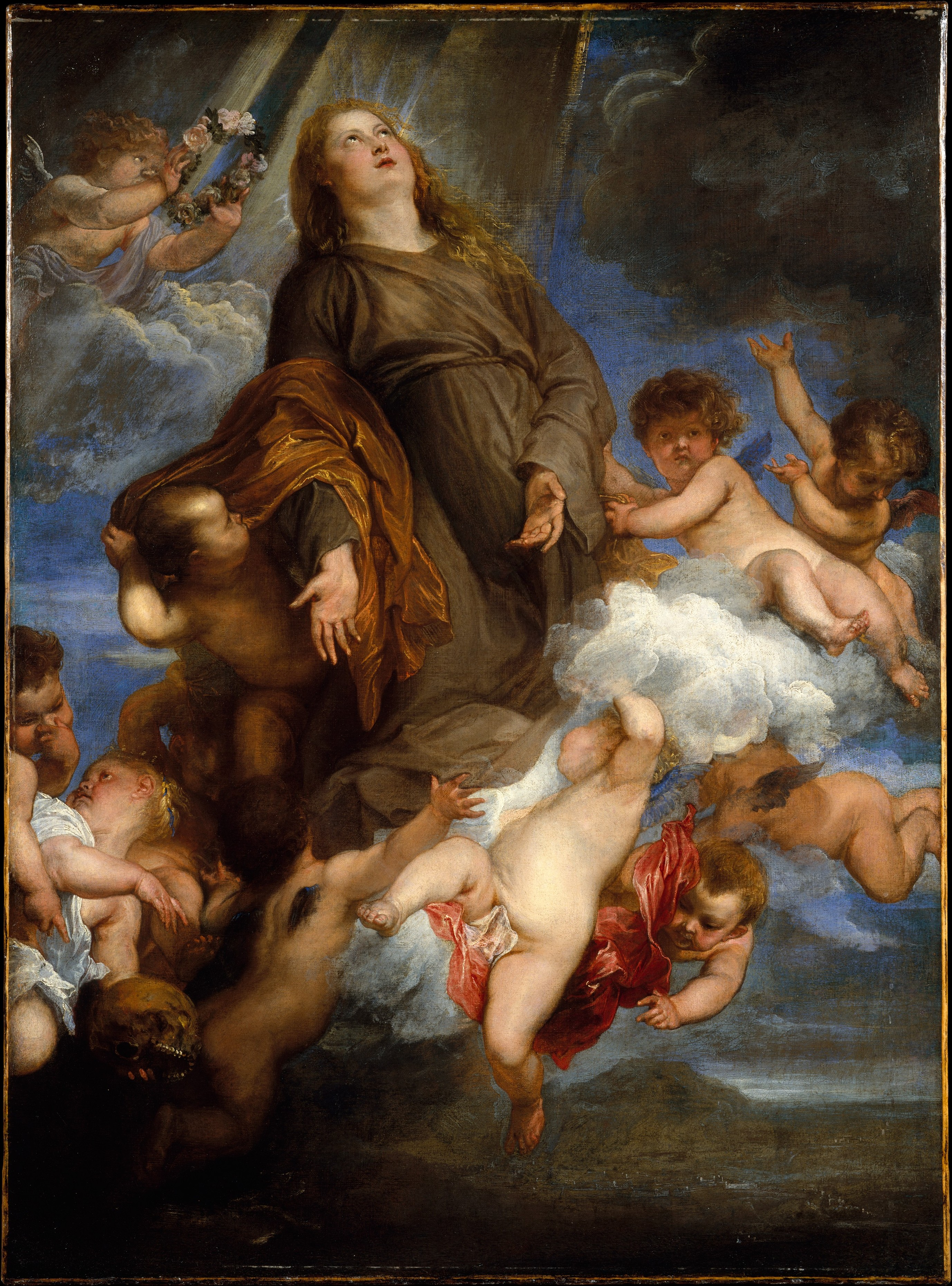
Saint Rosalie Interceding for the Plague-Stricken of Palermo, painting by Anthony van Dyck.

- 1625 – On 3 September, Archbishop Giannettino Doria declares the plague eradicated.
- 1629 – On 16 November, painter Sofonisba Anguissola dies in Palermo.
- 1630 – Saint Rosalia is included in the Roman Martyrology.
- 1633 – The poisoner Teofania di Adamo, considered the inventor of Aqua Tofana, is sentenced to death.
- 1640 – The Church of San Domenico is rebuilt in its present form.
- 1646 – A severe famine strikes the city. The devotional food traditions associated with Saint Lucy are linked to the end of the famine.
- 1647 – The Palermo revolt of 1647, led by Giuseppe D'Alesi, breaks out.
- 1652 – The Senate of Palermo elects Benedict the Moor as one of the city's patron saints.
- 1658 – Il Xerse is the first opera performed in Palermo.
- 1660 – Composer Alessandro Scarlatti, founder of the Neapolitan School, is born in Palermo.
- 1666 – In November, a flood caused by the overflowing of the Kemonia causes damage and casualties.
- 1669 – Porta Nuova is completely rebuilt following the 1667 explosion.

Porta Nuova.

- 1676
  - 2 June – Battle of Palermo during the Franco-Dutch War.
  - First construction of the Teatro Travaglino, today's Teatro Bellini.
- 1683 – Construction of Villa Ventimiglia di Geraci, the first noble villa built on the Piana dei Colli.
- 1693 – On 28 October, the Teatro Santa Cecilia is inaugurated.

=== 18th century ===
- 1713 – On 24 December, at Palermo Cathedral, Victor Amadeus II of Savoy is crowned King of Sicily together with his consort Anne Marie d'Orléans.
- 1718 – Foundation of the Academy of Sciences, Letters and Arts.

Giuseppe Balsamo, known as Cagliostro.

- 1730 – Foundation of the Accademia degli Ereini.
- 1735 – On 3 July, Charles of Bourbon is crowned sovereign of the kingdoms of Sicily and Naples at Palermo Cathedral.
- 1739 – Archaeological discovery of the early Christian catacombs of Porta d'Ossuna.
- 1743 – On 2 June, the alchemist and adventurer Cagliostro is born in Ballarò.
- 1773 – In September, the revolt against Viceroy Fogliani breaks out.
- 1778 – The public park of Villa Giulia is inaugurated.
- 1782
  - The Sicilian Inquisition is abolished.
  - The Biblioteca Regia, now the Biblioteca centrale della Regione Siciliana, is established.
- 1789 – On 30 July, the murderer Giovanna Bonanno, later known as the "The Old Vinegar Lady", is executed at the Quattro Canti.
- 1790 – Foundation of the Palermo Astronomical Observatory at the Palazzo dei Normanni.

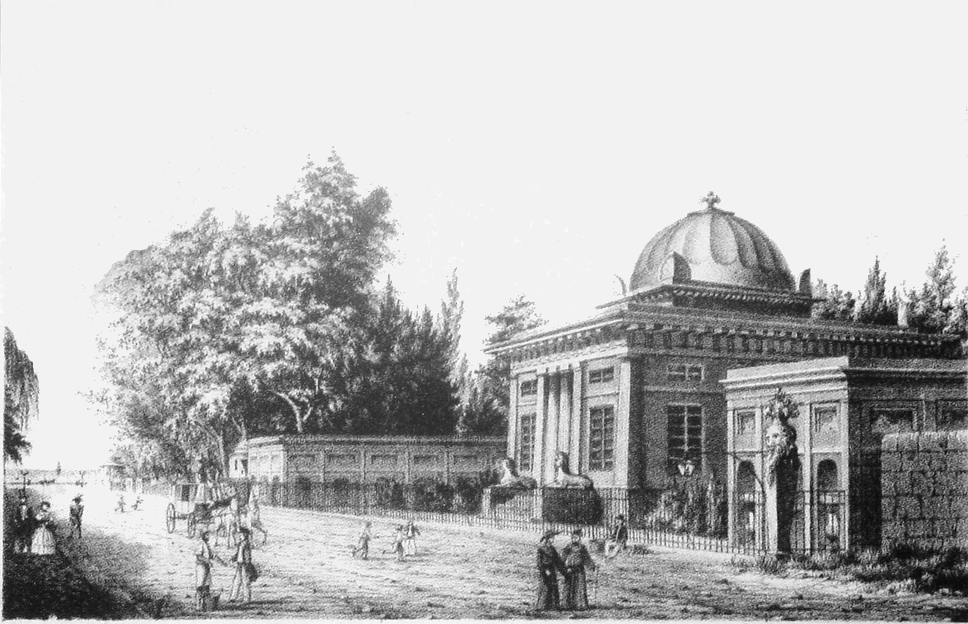
The Orto botanico di Palermo in a 19th-century engraving.

- 1795
  - 20 May – The revolutionary Francesco Paolo Di Blasi is executed at the Piano di Santa Teresa.
  - 9 December – The new Orto botanico di Palermo is inaugurated.
- 1796 – The abbot Giuseppe Vella is sentenced to imprisonment for the so-called "Arabic imposture".
- 1798 – King Ferdinand III of Sicily and IV of Naples, during the war against France, leaves Naples and takes refuge with his court in Palermo.
- 1799
  - Construction of the Palazzina Cinese begins and the Parco della Favorita is established.
  - The Florio family's business activities begin.

== Contemporary era ==
=== 19th century ===
Ferdinand III of Sicily and IV of Naples.

- 1801 – On 1 January, from the Palermo Astronomical Observatory, Giuseppe Piazzi discovers Ceres.
- 1802 – King Ferdinand and the court return to Naples.
- 1803 – The bandit Pasquale Bruno is executed at the Piano della Marina.
- 1805 – The Palermitan admiral Federico Gravina commands the Spanish Real Armada at the Battle of Trafalgar.
- 1806
  - 12 January – The University of Palermo is established.
  - 23 January – King Ferdinand and the court leave Naples again and settle in Palermo.
- 1808–1814 – The future King of France Louis Philippe resides at the Palazzo d'Orléans.
- 1812 – On 19 July, the Sicilian Constitution of 1812 is approved at the Collegio Massimo dei Gesuiti.
- 1814 – Foundation of the present-day Antonino Salinas Regional Archaeological Museum.
- 1815 – King Ferdinand and the court return to Naples in the context of the Congress of Vienna.
- 1816 – On 8 December, the Kingdom of Sicily is abolished and the Kingdom of the Two Sicilies is established.
- 1817 – Naples becomes the capital of the new Kingdom of the Two Sicilies. Palermo loses its status as a state capital.

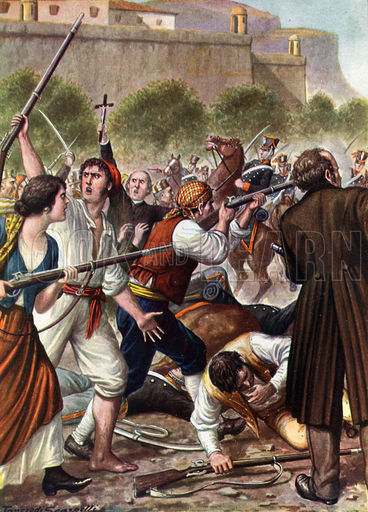
The 1820 uprising, illustration by Tancredi Scarpelli.

- 1820
  - 15 July – The Sicilian revolution of 1820 breaks out in Palermo in support of Sicilian independence.
  - 22 November – Neapolitan rule over the city is restored.
- 1824 – Pietro Pisani establishes the Real Casa dei Matti di Palermo.
- 1826 – The Palermitan Pietro Bachi becomes the first Italian professor in the history of Harvard University.
- 1829 – Maria Christina of the Two Sicilies, a native of Palermo, becomes Queen of Spain.
- 1832 – Louise of Orléans, a native of Palermo, becomes the first Queen of the Belgians.
- 1834 – The Antica Focacceria San Francesco begins operations.
- 1837 – A severe cholera epidemic strikes Palermo and the rest of Sicily.
- 1840 – Vincenzo Florio Sr. establishes the shipping company Flotte Riunite Florio.
- 1845 – The Palermo Stock Exchange opens.
- 1845–1846 – The Emperor Nicholas I of Russia and his consort Alexandra Feodorovna stay in Palermo.
- 1847 – The Castelnuovo Agricultural Institute is inaugurated.
- 1848
  - 12 January – The Sicilian revolution of 1848 breaks out in Palermo.
  - 25 March – The Sicilian Parliament resumes its sessions at the Church of San Domenico, and the Kingdom of Sicily is re-established with Palermo as its capital.
  - 10 July – The Sicilian Constitution of 1848 is approved.

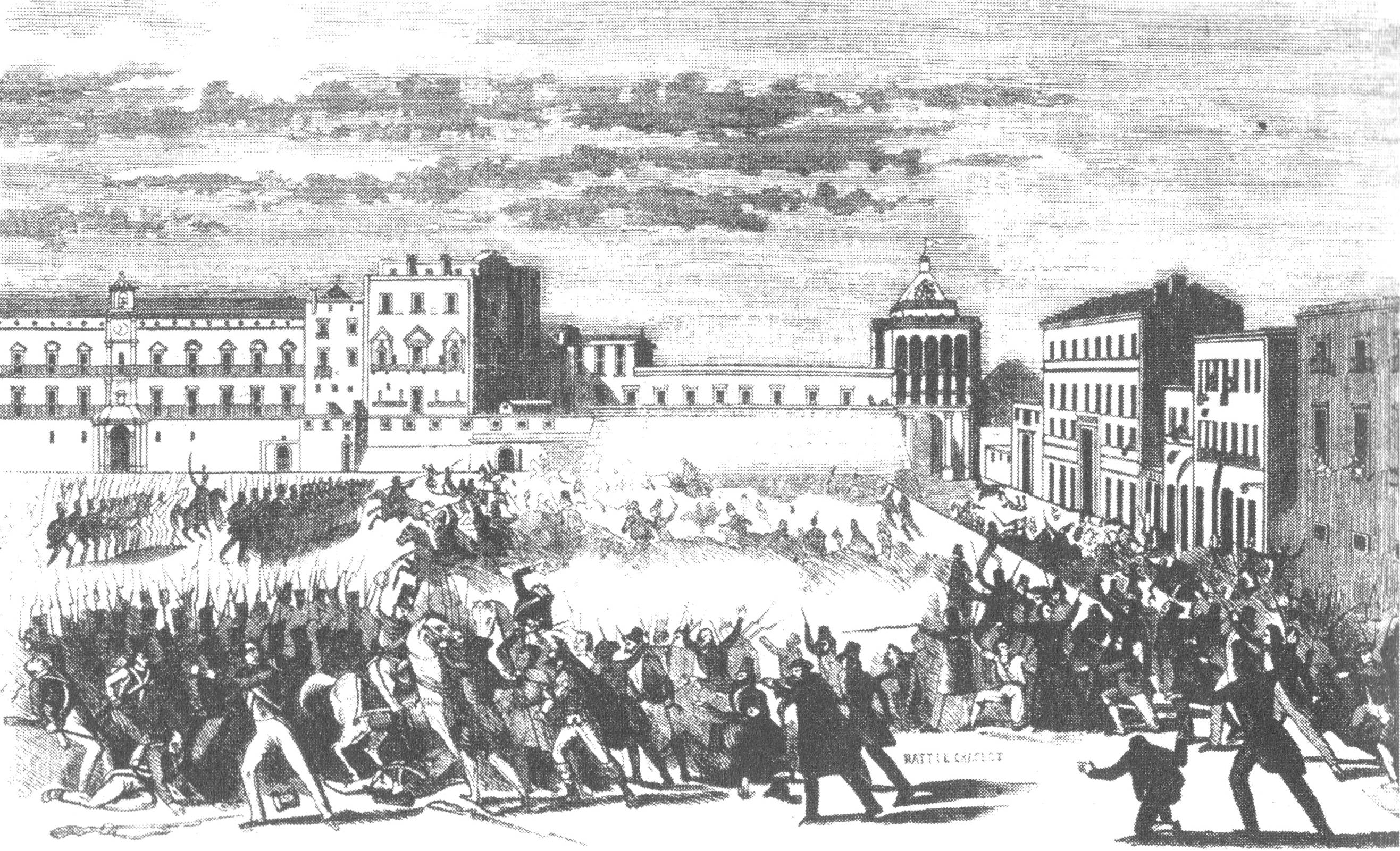
Illustration of the clashes during the 1848 revolution.

- 1849
  - 15 May – Bourbon forces recapture Palermo.
  - 27 September – Foundation of the Banco di Sicilia.
- 1850 – Anti-Bourbon conspiracy of Niccolò Garzilli and subsequent executions at Fieravecchia.
- 1860
  - 4 April – The Gancia revolt breaks out in Palermo.
  - 14 April – Thirteen people accused of involvement in the revolt are sentenced to death without trial.
  - 27 May – The Palermo insurrection begins as part of the Expedition of the Thousand.
  - 7 June – The first issue of the daily newspaper Giornale di Sicilia is published.

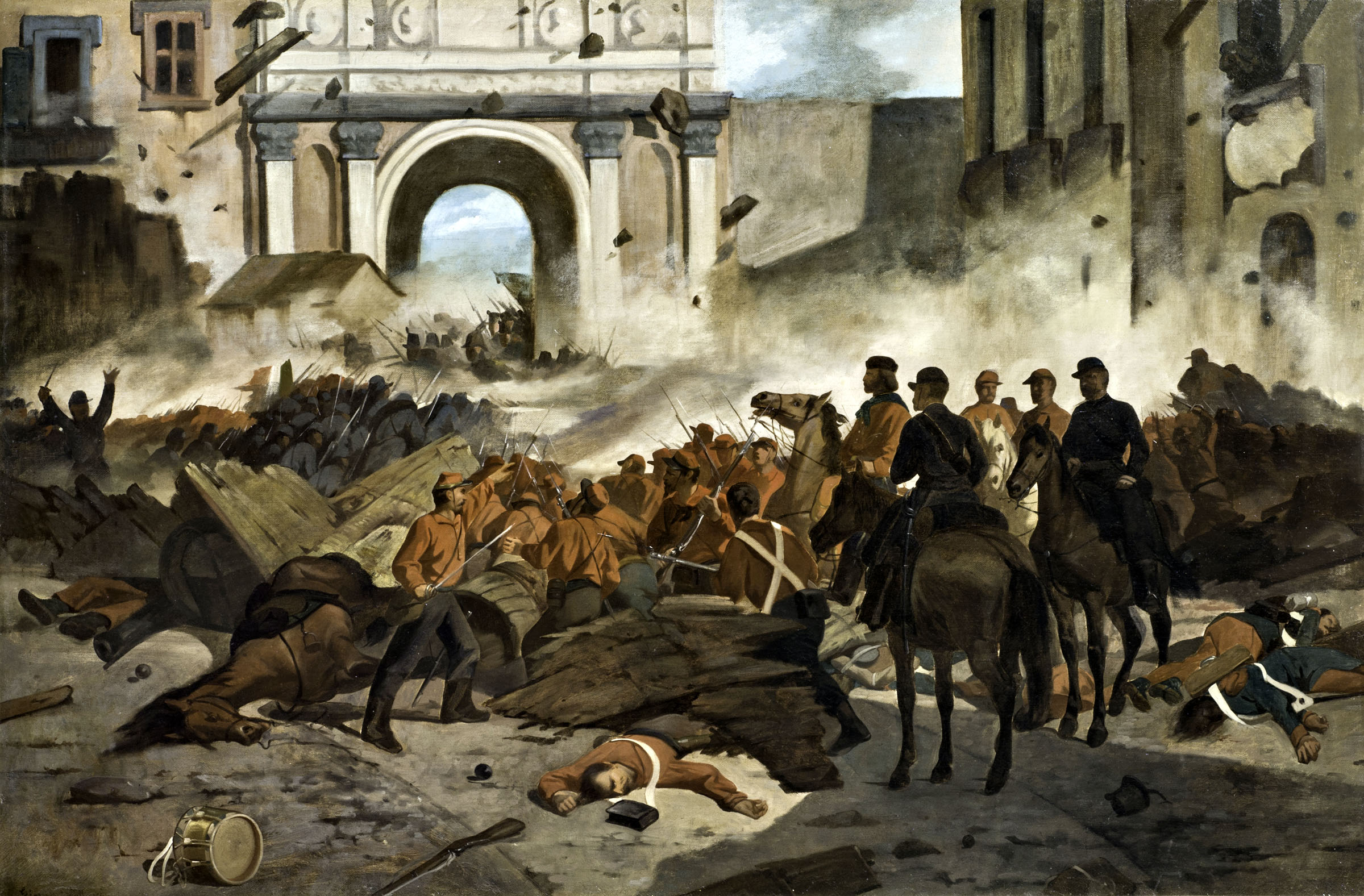
Garibaldi in Palermo, painting by Giovanni Fattori.

- 1861
  - 18 February – The Palermitan Ruggero Settimo is elected the first President of the Italian Senate.
  - 11 July – The term of Giulio Benso della Verdura, the last praetor of Palermo before the establishment of the office of mayor, ends.
  - Foundation of the bank Sicilcassa.
- 1862 – On the evening of 1 October, the Conspiracy of the Stabbers takes place.
- 1863 – First performance of the play I mafiusi de la Vicaria.
- 1865 – Establishment of the Province of Palermo.
- 1866 – On 16 September, the Seven and a Half Days Revolt breaks out; it is suppressed on 22 September.
- 1873 – Foundation of the Società Siciliana per la Storia Patria.
- 1874 – On 7 June, the Teatro Politeama is inaugurated.
- 1877 – The Palermo Stone, an important source for the history of ancient Egypt, becomes part of the collections of the archaeological museum directed by Antonino Salinas.

Pavilions of the Italian National Exhibition.

- 1882 – At the Grand Hotel et des Palmes, Richard Wagner completes Parsifal.
- 1884 – Foundation of the Circolo Matematico di Palermo.
- 1885 – Approval of the Giarrusso urban plan.
- 1886 – On 7 June, Palermo Centrale railway station is inaugurated.
- 1887
  - The Palermo tramway network begins operation.
  - The religious figure Giacomo Cusmano establishes the Missionaries of the Servants of the Poors.
- 1891
  - Reclamation of the Mondello gulf begins.
  - On 6 February, the Palermitan Antonio Starabba, Marchese di Rudinì becomes Prime Minister of Italy.
- 1891–1892 – Palermo hosts the fourth edition of the Italian National Exhibition.
- 1892 – The Palermo section of the Fasci Siciliani is established.
- 1893 – Former Mayor of Palermo Emanuele Notarbartolo is murdered by the Mafia in Termini Imerese.
- 1894 – Work begins on the opening of Via Roma.

The Teatro Massimo.

- 1897
  - 16 May – The Teatro Massimo is inaugurated.
  - Foundation of the Palermo Shipyard.
- 1898 – Palermo is awarded the Gold Medal as a Meritorious City of the Risorgimento.

=== 20th century ===
- 1900
  - 11 February - The Monreale tramway enters service.
  - 22 April - The first issue of the daily newspaper L'Ora is published.
  - 1 November - The Anglo Palermitan Athletic and Football Club, the original name of Palermo FC, is founded.
  - 19 December - The luxury hotel Villa Igiea is inaugurated.
- 1903 - On 15 October, the Teatro Biondo is inaugurated.

The Targa Florio in 1906.

- 1905 - Lucarelli Film, the oldest film production company in Sicily, is founded.
- 1906 - On 6 May, the first edition of the Targa Florio automobile race takes place.
- 1907 - On 3 October, the first edition of the Giro di Sicilia cycling race starts in Palermo.
- 1909
  - Publication in instalments of the romanzo d'appendice I Beati Paoli by Luigi Natoli.
  - Giuseppe Pitrè founds the Sicilian Ethnographic Museum Giuseppe Pitrè.
  - 12 March - Italian-American police officer Joe Petrosino is killed near Piazza Marina.
- 1910 - Foundation of the Philosophical Library of Palermo.

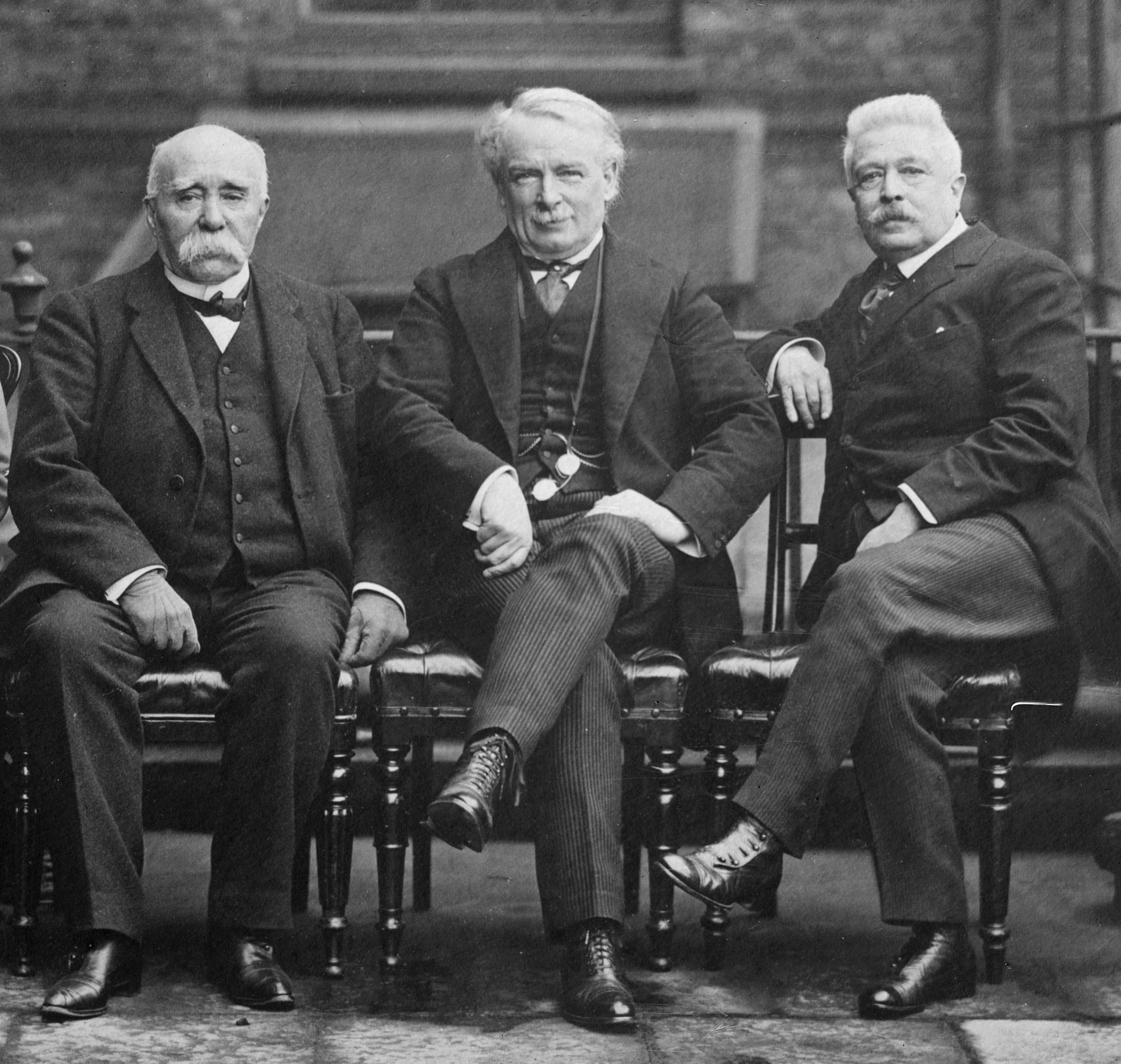
Vittorio Emanuele Orlando (left) with the prime ministers of France and United Kingdom.

- 1913 - On 15 July, the Antico Stabilimento Balneare of Mondello is inaugurated.
- 1917 - On 30 October, Palermo native Vittorio Emanuele Orlando becomes Prime Minister of Italy.
- 1919 - Foundation of the Gonzaga Institute.
- 1922 - Demolition of the Castello a Mare.
- 1923 - The Prefecture of Palermo expels Aleister Crowley, founder of the Abbey of Thelema in Cefalù, from Italy.
- 1931
  - The flood that occurred in February causes 10 deaths and 21 injuries.
  - The Palermo–Boccadifalco Airport is inaugurated.
- 1932 - The present-day Stadio Renzo Barbera is inaugurated under the name Stadio del Littorio.
- 1935 - First edition of the Internazionali di Sicilia tennis tournament.
- 1938 - The course of the Oreto river is diverted.
- 1939
  - The Palermo trolleybus network enters service.
  - The Flaccovio publishing house is founded in Palermo.

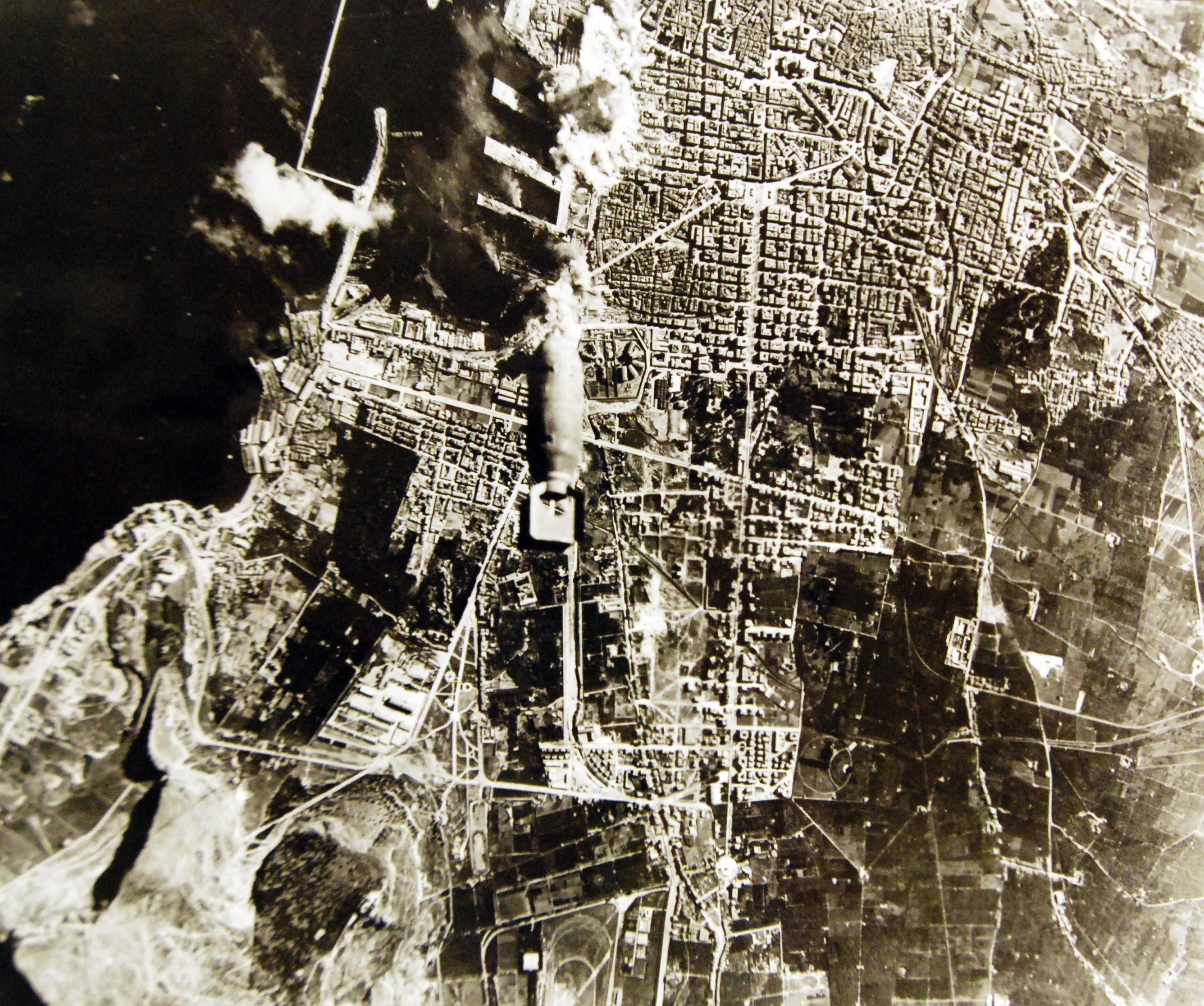
Aerial photograph of the bombings.

- 1940-1943 - Bombing of Palermo in World War II. Civilian casualties number 2,123, with 30,000 wounded. The city's architectural heritage suffers extensive damage.
- 1942 - Official recognition of the coat of arms of the city of Palermo.
- 1943
  - 22 July - Charles Poletti assumes the position of commissioner for civil affairs of the AMGOT.
  - 29 September - Independence activist Lucio Tasca becomes the first mayor of Palermo after the period of the Fascist podestà.
- 1944 - On 19 October, the bread massacre takes place on Via Maqueda, in which 24 demonstrators are killed.
- 1946
  - 15 May - Umberto II promulgates the Statute of Sicily. The Sicilian Region is established, with Palermo as its regional capital.
  - 23 July - Foundation of the Fiera del Mediterraneo.

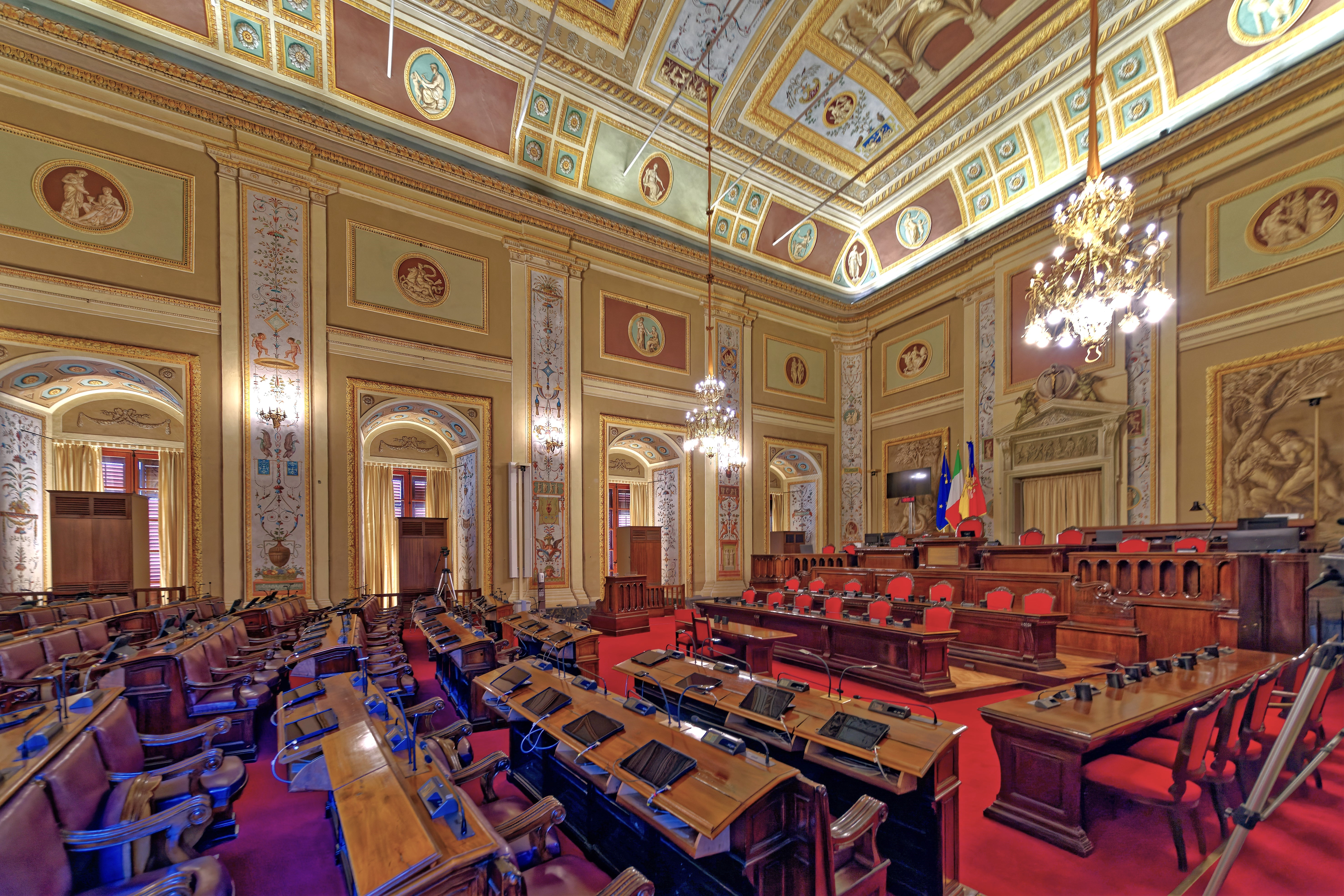
The Sala d'Ercole of the Royal Palace, meeting hall of the ARS.

- 1947
  - 25 May - The first session of the Sicilian Regional Assembly is held at the Palazzo dei Normanni.
  - The Palazzo d'Orléans becomes the seat of the Presidency of the Sicilian Region.
  - The film production company Panaria Film is founded.
- 1949
  - On 19 August, seven Carabinieri are killed in the Bellolampo massacre by the gang of Salvatore Giuliano.
  - Palermo hosts the 13th edition of the beauty pageant Miss Europe.
- 1952 - Panaria Film produces The Golden Coach, the first European film in Technicolor.
- 1953 - Archaeological discovery of the prehistoric graffiti in the Addaura Caves.

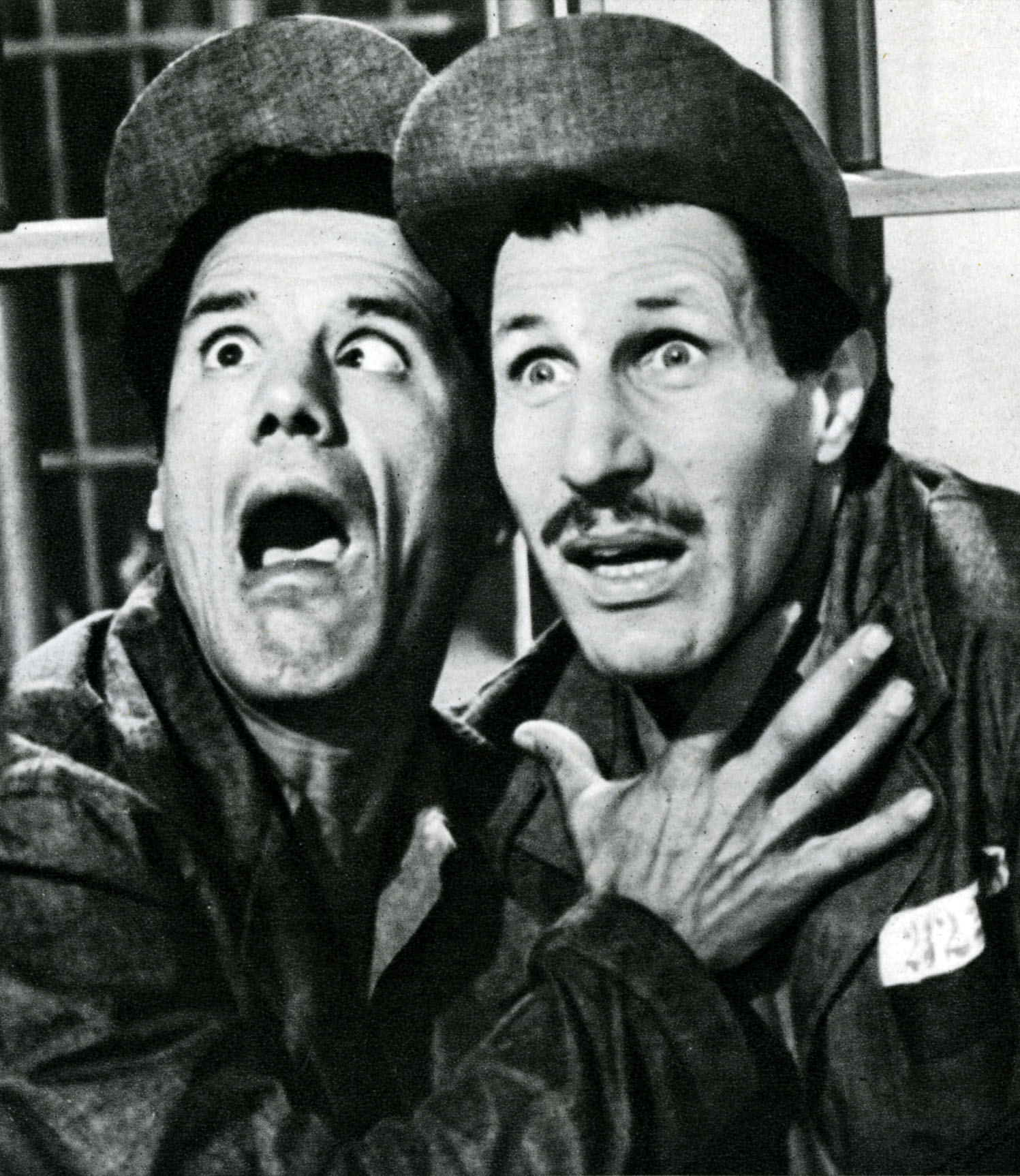
The comedy duo Franco and Ciccio.

- 1954
  - Opening of the Galleria Regionale della Sicilia at the Palazzo Abatellis.
  - Formation of the comedy duo Franco and Ciccio, consisting of Franco Franchi and Ciccio Ingrassia.
- 1957 - Grand Hotel et des Palmes Mafia meeting.
- 1958 - Giuseppe Tomasi di Lampedusa publishes the novel The Leopard.
- 1959
  - Demolition of Villa Deliella, a symbolic event of the Sack of Palermo.
  - Palermo hosts the 22nd edition of the beauty pageant Miss Europe.
- 1960
  - 2 January - The inaugural flight from Palermo Airport takes place.
  - 8 July - Four people are killed during protests against the Tambroni government.
- 1962 - Approval of the new city master plan, providing for the urban expansion.
- 1962-1963 - First Mafia War.
- 1963
  - 30 June - Seven members of the Italian Armed Forces are killed in the Ciaculli massacre.
  - The literary postmodern avant-garde movement Gruppo 63 is founded in Palermo.
  - The film The Leopard, directed by Luchino Visconti, is released in cinemas.

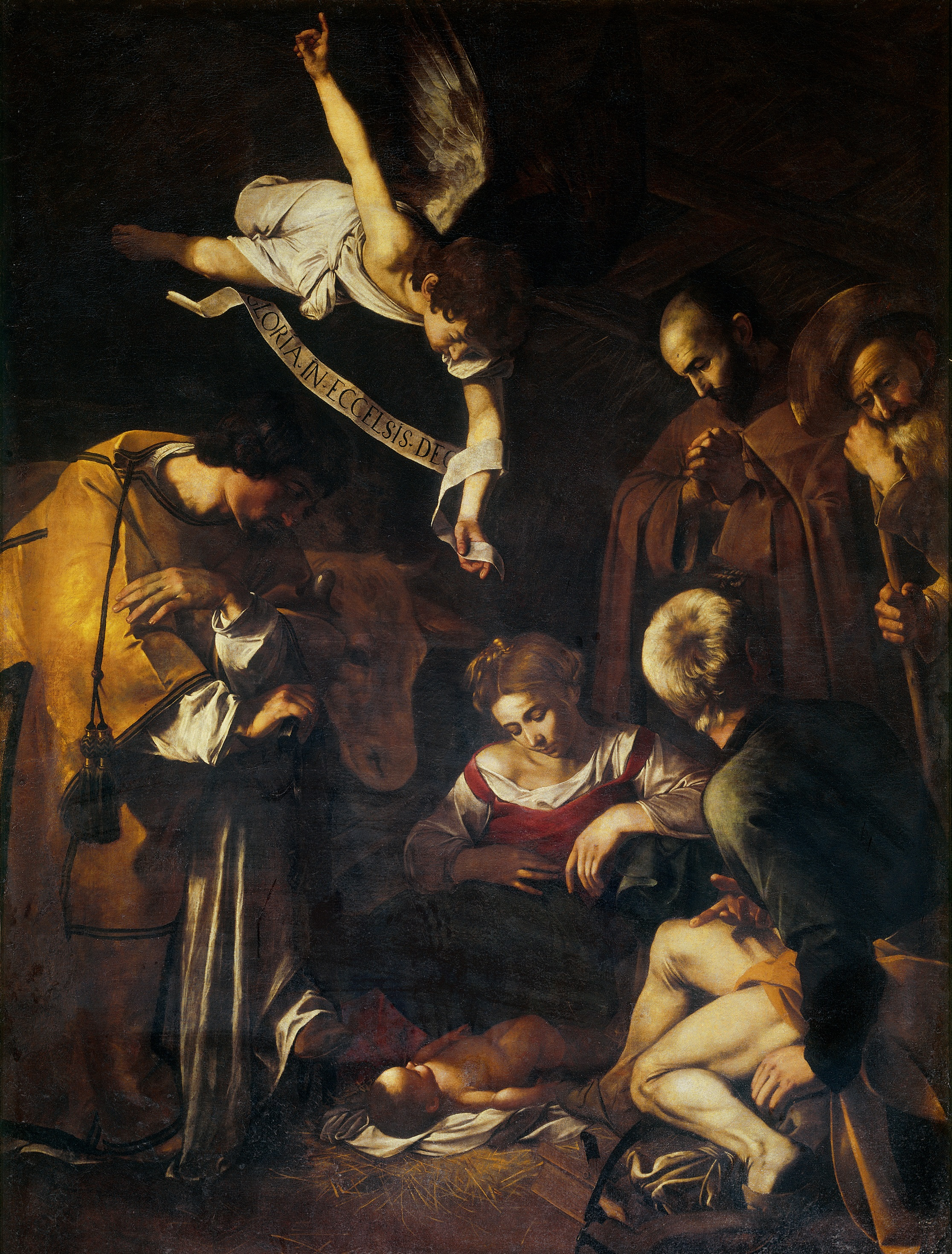
Nativity with St. Francis and St. Lawrence by Caravaggio. Stolen from the Oratory of San Lorenzo.

- 1964
  - 5 March - Palermo is awarded the Gold Medal of Military Valor for the War of Liberation.
  - Palermo-born driver Nino Vaccarella wins the 24 Hours of Le Mans.
- 1966 - The theatrical and cabaret company Travaglini is founded.
- 1969
  - The Sellerio publishing house is founded in Palermo.
  - The Caravaggio painting Nativity with St. Francis and St. Lawrence is stolen from the Oratory of San Lorenzo.
- 1970 - First edition of the music festival Palermo Pop, one of the first Woodstock-style events in Italy.
- 1971 - Black Sabbath give their first performance in Italy during Palermo Pop 71.
- 1972 - On 5 May, Alitalia Flight 112 crashes at Mount Longa, killing 115 people.
- 1974 - Renato Guttuso creates his most famous painting, Vucciria.
- 1978 - On 23 December, Alitalia Flight 4128 crashes into the sea, killing 108 people.
- 1979 - The mafia kills Boris Giuliano, police chief of Palermo, followed by magistrate Cesare Terranova and police escort officer Lenin Mancuso.

The headline of L'Ora reporting the assassination of Piersanti Mattarella.

- 1980
  - 6 January - Assassination of Piersanti Mattarella, president of the Sicilian Region.
  - 27 June - The Ustica air disaster causes 81 deaths.
  - 9 December - Arcigay is founded in Palermo.
- 1981-1984 - Second Mafia War.
- 1982
  - 30 April - Regional secretary of the PCI Pio La Torre and his bodyguard Rosario Di Salvo are assassinated.
  - 3 September - In the Via Carini massacre, the prefect Carlo Alberto dalla Chiesa, his wife Emanuela Setti Carraro and police escort officer Domenico Russo are killed.
  - 23 November - Visit of Pope John Paul II to the city.
- 1983
  - 19 April - Elda Pucci is elected mayor of Palermo. She is the first woman to serve as mayor of a regional capital in Italian history.
  - 29 July - In the Via Pipitone massacre, magistrate Rocco Chinnici, Carabinieri officers Mario Trapassi and Salvatore Bartolotta, and civilian Stefano Li Sacchi are killed.
- 1984 - Tommaso Buscetta becomes a pentito, making disclosures that prove decisive in investigations into Cosa Nostra.

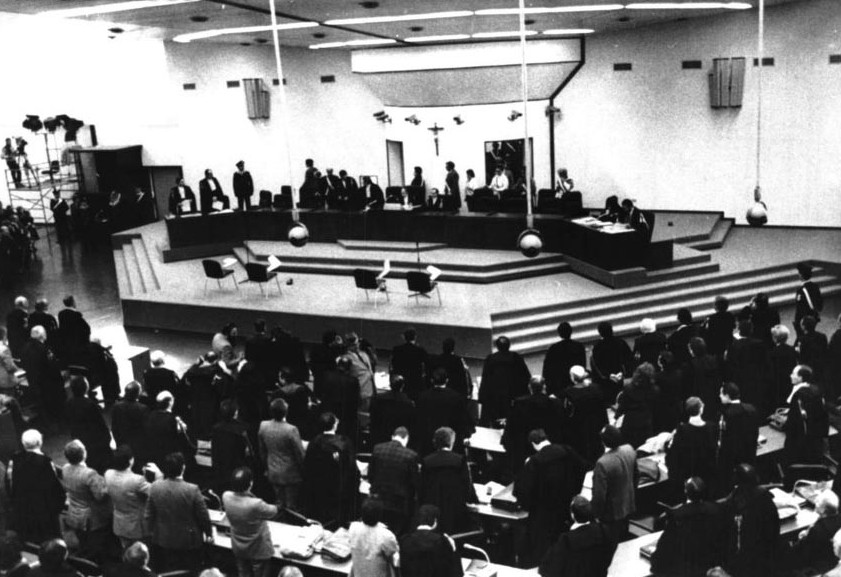
A hearing of the Maxi Trial.

- 1985
  - 16 July - First term as mayor of Leoluca Orlando and beginning of the Palermo Spring.
  - 6 August - Deputy police commissioner Ninni Cassarà and police officer Roberto Antiochia are assassinated.
- 1986 - On 10 February, the Maxi Trial begins.
- 1988
  - 12 January - Former mayor of Palermo Giuseppe Insalaco is assassinated by the mafia.
  - First edition of the Internazionali Femminili di Palermo tennis tournament.
- 1990
  - The Palermo metropolitan railway service enters service.
  - Palermo is one of twelve cities to host the 1990 FIFA World Cup. Palermo-born Salvatore Schillaci, the tournament's top scorer, is awarded the Golden Ball.
  - 20 September - Folk singer Rosa Balistreri dies in Palermo.
- 1991 - Former mayor of Palermo Leoluca Orlando founds the national political party La Rete.

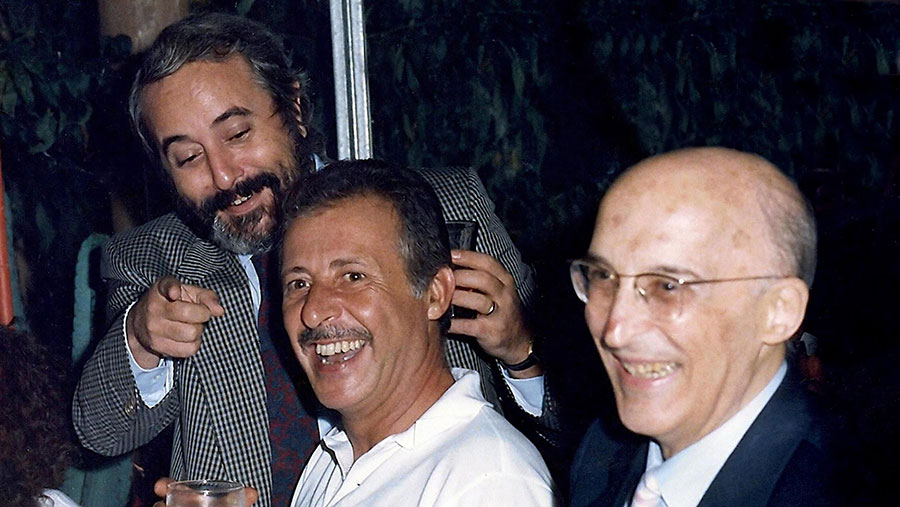
Giovanni Falcone and Paolo Borsellino with their colleague Antonino Caponnetto.

- 1992
  - 23 May - In the Capaci bombing, magistrates Giovanni Falcone and Francesca Morvillo, as well as escort officers Vito Schifani, Rocco Dicillo and Antonio Montinaro, are killed.
  - 19 July - In the Via D'Amelio bombing, magistrate Paolo Borsellino and escort officers Agostino Catalano, Emanuela Loi, Vincenzo Li Muli, Walter Eddie Cosina and Claudio Traina are killed.
- 1993
  - 15 January - Mafia boss Totò Riina is arrested in Palermo.
  - 15 September - Priest Pino Puglisi is assassinated by the mafia.
- 1994 - UCI Track Cycling World Championships are held at the Velodromo Paolo Borsellino.
- 1995
  - Beginning of the process to establish the Cantieri Culturali alla Zisa.
  - 23 November - Visit of Pope John Paul II to the city.

The Stadio Renzo Barbera.

- 1997
  - Palermo hosts the 19th Summer Universiade.
  - The Stadio La Favorita hosts the UEFA Super Cup.
  - Foundation of the ISMETT.
  - Closure of the Palermo Stock Exchange.
- 1999 - Inauguration of the Palasport Fondo Patti.

=== 21st century ===
- 2000 - Signing of the Palermo Protocols and the United Nations Convention against Transnational Organized Crime.
- 2001 - The Opera dei Pupi is declared Intangible Cultural Heritage of Humanity by UNESCO.
- 2002
  - The Stadio La Favorita is renamed after former Palermo president Renzo Barbera.
  - Approval of the new city master plan.
  - 6 September - Strong earthquake offshore from the city.
- 2010 - Visit of Pope Benedict XVI to the city.

The Church of San Cataldo, among the properties included in the World Heritage Site list.

- 2013 - On 25 May, at the Foro Italico, Pino Puglisi is proclaimed blessed by the Catholic Church.
- 2015
  - 31 January - Palermo-born Sergio Mattarella is elected President of Italy.
  - 3 July - The Arab-Norman Palermo and the Cathedral Churches of Cefalù and Monreale itinerary is recognized as a World Heritage Site by UNESCO.
  - 4 August - Establishment of the Metropolitan City of Palermo.
- 2017 - Letizia Battaglia founds the International Center of Photography.
- 2018
  - Palermo is Italian Capital of Culture and hosts the 12th edition of Manifesta.
  - 15 September - Visit of Pope Francis to the city.
  - In November, the Palermo Conference for Libya is held.
- 2020 - 15 July flood.
- 2023 - On 13 October, the new Molo Trapezoidale is inaugurated.

== See also ==
- History of Palermo
- List of mayors of Palermo
- List of landmarks in Palermo
- Archivio di Stato di Palermo (state archives)
- History of Sicily
- Timelines of other cities in the macroregion of Insular Italy:^{(it)}
  - Sardinia: Timeline of Cagliari
  - Sicily: Timeline of Catania, Messina, Syracuse, Trapani
