= History of Palermo =

History of Italian city

Palermo is one of the major cities of Italy, and the historical and administrative capital of Sicily.

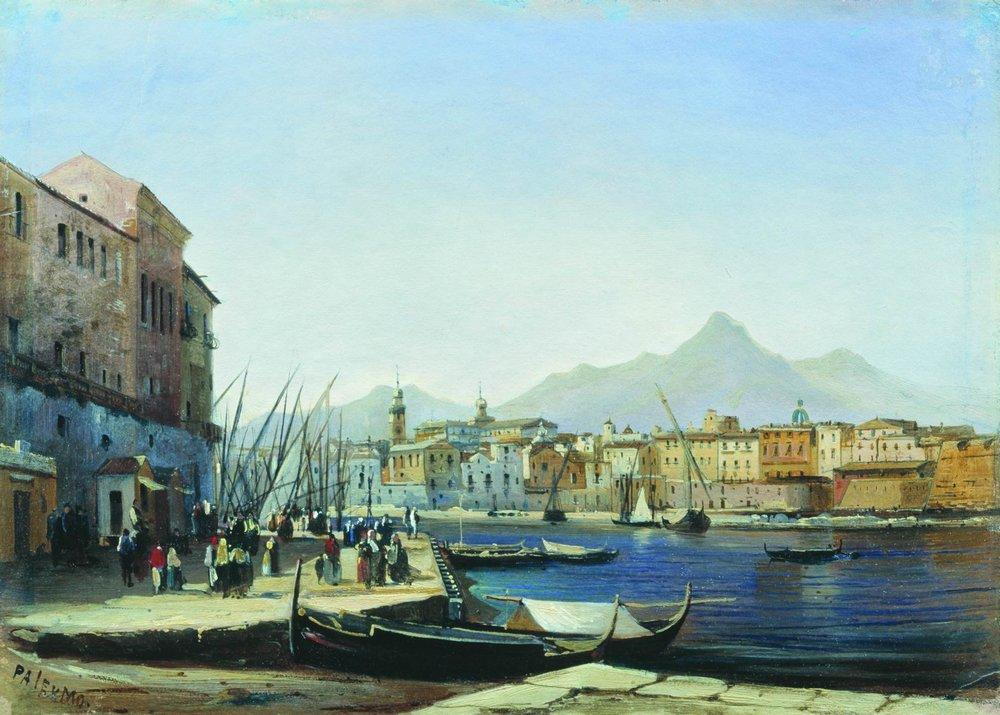
Palermo in the 19th century

== First settlements ==
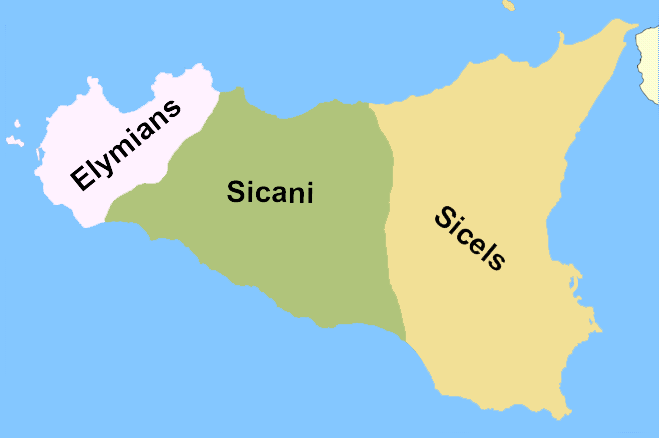
A rough map of Sicilian Italic tribe locations

Human settlement in the Palermo area goes back to prehistoric times. It has one of the most ancient sites in Sicily: Interesting graffiti and prehistoric paintings were discovered in the Addaura grottoes in 1953 by archaeologist Jole Bovio Marconi. They portray dancing figures performing a propitiatory rite, perhaps shamans.

== Phoenicians ==
In the 8th c. BC Phoenicians established a flourishing merchant colony in the Palermo area. The relationship of the new city with the Siculi, the people living in the Eastern part of the Island involved both commerce and war. The first building in which soon became a great city was called Mabbonath ("lodging" in Phoenician). The settlement itself was known as Ziz (Punic: 𐤑𐤉𐤑, ṣyṣ), meaning "Flower". It was the most important of the three colonies forming the "Phoenician Triangle" cited by Thucydides, the others being Motya and Soluntum.

== Greeks ==
Between the 8th and the 7th centuries BC, the Greeks colonized Sicily. They called the city Panormos ("All port") and traded with the Carthaginians. The two civilizations lived together in Sicily until the Roman conquest. Carthaginian coins from Palermo used the Greek name Panormos from the 5th century BC. The Greek colony at Panormos had two cores: the "Old Town" (Paleopolis) between the two rivers Kemonia and Papirethos and the "New Town" (Neapolis). Curiously, early Naples was also divided in two parts with the same names. Its current name stems from the latter.

== Punic Wars ==
In the course of the Punic Wars Palermo was fought over by the Carthaginians and the Romans until, in 254 BC, the Roman fleet besieged the city. It eventually surrendered and the population had to pay a war tribute to save their liberty. Hasdrubal tried to take it back, but the Roman consul Quintus Caecilius Metellus defeated him and imposed a lasting Roman rule over the town he knew as Panormus. In 247 BC, Hamilcar camped with the Carthaginian army on Monte Pellegrino, then called Ercta. However this was in vain, as Palermo remained loyal to Rome. It therefore gained the titles of Praetura, the Golden Eagle, and the right to mint a coin of its own, as one of only five free cities in Sicily.

== Roman and Byzantine age ==
Panormus was a flourishing and beautiful city during the Golden Age of the Roman Republic and Empire. In Piazza Vittoria ("Victory's Square") notable palaces and mosaics have been discovered and a large theatre still existed in the Norman age. According to geographer Strabo, during the Roman Empire it provided large amounts of wheat for the capital. However, after the reign of Vespasian, it decayed, and in 445 was sacked by the King of Vandal Africa, Gaiseric. Later it was part of the territory of Odoacer and Theoderic's Ostrogoths.

In 535, the Byzantine general Belisarius stormed the port, during Justinian I's program of reconquering Italy, which soon turned into the fierce and disastrous Gothic War. The Byzantine rule lasted until 831, when the Aghlabid Arabs, disembarked in Mazara del Vallo. The Arabs captured Palermo after a year-long siege and made it the capital city of their Sicilian emirate.

== Palermo under Arab rule ==
After the Byzantines were betrayed by admiral Euphemius who fled to Tunisia in 827 and begged the Aghlabid leader Ziyadat Allah to help him there was a Muslim conquest of Sicily, putting in place the Emirate of Sicily. The Aghlabids were good administrators. Under their rule Sicily became a rich and flourishing land.

The Arab rulers allowed the natives freedom of religion on the condition that they paid a tax.

Although their rule was short in time, it was then that Palermo (called Balharm in Arabic) displaced Syracuse as the prime city of Sicily; it was said to have competed with Córdoba and Cairo in terms of importance and splendor. In general, the Arab rule was tolerant, and Jews also had their space and were allowed to prosper. The Arabs are also said to have left a lasting influence on Sicilian culture and especially "the Arab concept of the family",

After dynasty related quarrels however, there was a Christian reconquest in the form of the Normans from the Duchy of Normandy, descendants of the Vikings; the family who returned the city to Christianity, largely to the efforts of Robert Guiscard and his army, were called the Hautevilles. For more than two hundred years Palermo was the capital of a flourishing Islamic civilisation in Sicily. The population of the city during this period is uncertain, as figures given by Arab writers during the era were unreliable. Paul Bairoch estimated Palermo's population at 350,000 around the 11th century, while other historians like Stephan R. Epstein estimated it to be closer to 60,000. Based on al-Maqdisi's statement that Palermo was larger than Old Cairo, Kenneth Meyer Setton put the figure above 100,000 but below 250,000.

Traces of the ancient Arab domination can be seen still today. Muslim artifacts include the Kasr ("Castle"), on the cape of the Paleopolis, the district of the great mosque, the Kalsa ("Elected"), the emirs' seat along the sea, the area of the Schiavoni ("slaves"), crossed by the Papireto river; and, in the western region, the Moasker, the soldiers' quarter.

However, the Arab emirate became increasingly torn by inner disputes and was a rather easy prey for the Normans, who had entered Sicily in 1061. In 1072, after four years of siege, Palermo fell to Count Roger I of Sicily, ending Muslim rule there.

== Normans ==
The Normans restored Christianity as the official religion and declared Palermo to be the capital of the island. In 1130, Roger II was crowned King of Sicily in Palermo. Although Christian, the Normans were tolerant towards the Muslim population, which was a majority in Palermo, but not in Sicily. Jews also remained an important community. However, many mosques were turned into Christian churches. The high level of this multicultural civilization can be seen by the splendour of the new monuments that the new King had built in Palermo. These buildings, which include the church of the Marturana and the Palatine Chapel, show a fascinating mix of Arab, Byzantine and Norman influences.

It was under Roger II of Sicily that his holdings of Sicily and the southern part of the Italian Peninsula were promoted, from the County of Sicily into the Kingdom of Sicily; the kingdom was ruled from Palermo as its capital, with the king's court held at Palazzo dei Normanni. Much construction was undertaken during this period, such as the building of the Palermo Cathedral. The Kingdom of Sicily became one of the wealthiest states in Europe, as wealthy as the fellow Norman state, the Kingdom of England. Though the city's population had dropped to 150,000, it became the largest city in Europe, due to the larger decline in Constantinople's population.

In 1194 Sicily became part of the Holy Roman Empire, placing itself above the other states. Palermo was the preferred city of the Emperor Frederick II. Muslims of Palermo were migrated and expelled during Holy Roman rule. After an interval of Angevin rule (1266–1282), Sicily came under the house of Aragon. By 1330, Palermo's population had declined to 51,000.

== Swabian period and the House of Anjou ==
The state marriage between the emperor Henry VI and the last descendant of the Norman monarchs, Constance of Hauteville, gave the Kingdom of Sicily and Palermo to the Hohenstaufen house of Germany. However, the noblemen refused to be ruled by a foreigner, and Henry had to fight a rival king, before conquering Palermo in 1194 and being crowned as King. The second ruler of the house of Swabia-Sicily was the famed Frederick II. He probably considered himself as primarily a true Sicilian instead of a German. Under his reign Palermo became the effective capital of the Holy Roman Empire. Palermo's court anticipated Renaissance courts and hosted some of the best intellectuals, artists and scholars of the period. The first Italian poetical school was born in Palermo.

Frederick died in 1250 and was buried in the cathedral. His illegitimate son Manfred succeeded him and continued his cultural and administrative politics. However, in 1268 Manfred was defeated by Charles I of Anjou, and the Kingdom of Sicily passed to this new French house. Palermo suffered a decay as the capital was moved to Naples. Charles and his officials exploited Sicily heavily and the island rebelled in 1282 (the Sicilian Vespers), giving itself to the Aragonese.

== Palermo under Aragon ==
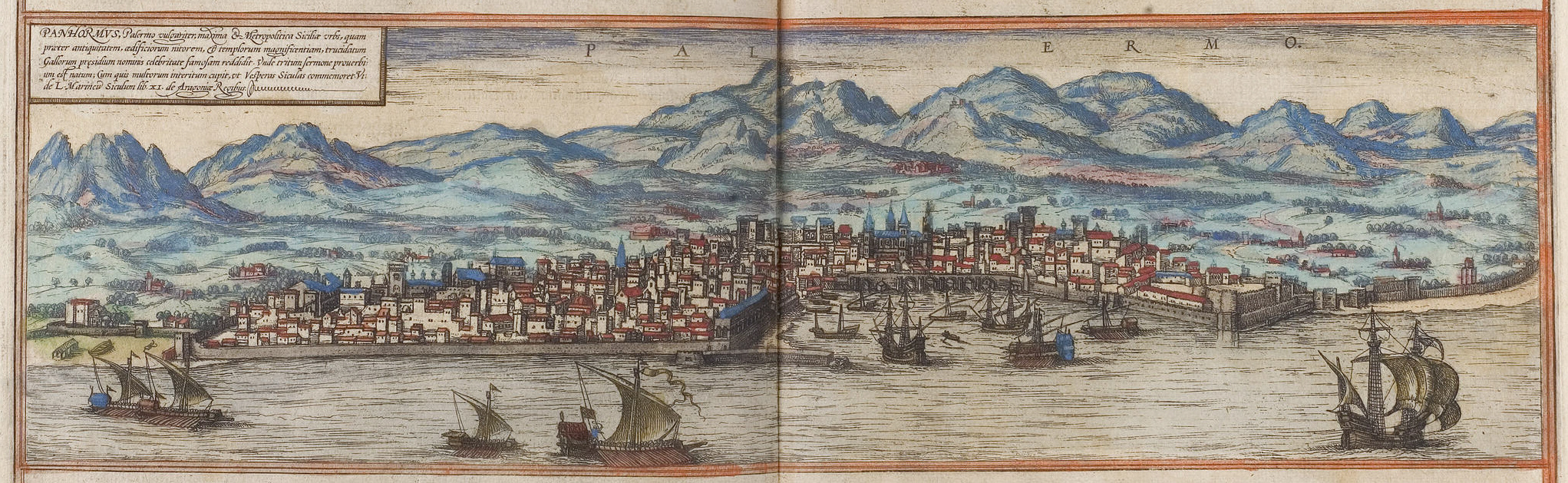
Palermo in the 16th century

Under the Aragonese, Palermo saw internal struggles of noble families such as the Ventimiglia, Alagona and Chiaramante, who contended for control over western Sicily. The sumptuous Palazzo Steri and Palazzo Sclafani were constructed under the Aragonese. The city flourished again by trading raw materials and crafted products with Genoa and Spain. In 1409, after the death of King Martin I, Sicily was annexed by Spain and Palermo became the seat of a viceroy. The Jews were expelled and the Holy Inquisition increased its power over the city. Arts were still pre-eminent with buildings like the church of San Giuseppe, the Spasimo theatre and the Porta Nuova. However, heavy taxes were imposed, to pay this construction program. The era of Charles V and his son Philip II were difficult for Palermo, as the barons felt free to dominate the city through their unruly bands of bravoes.

== Bourbon House ==
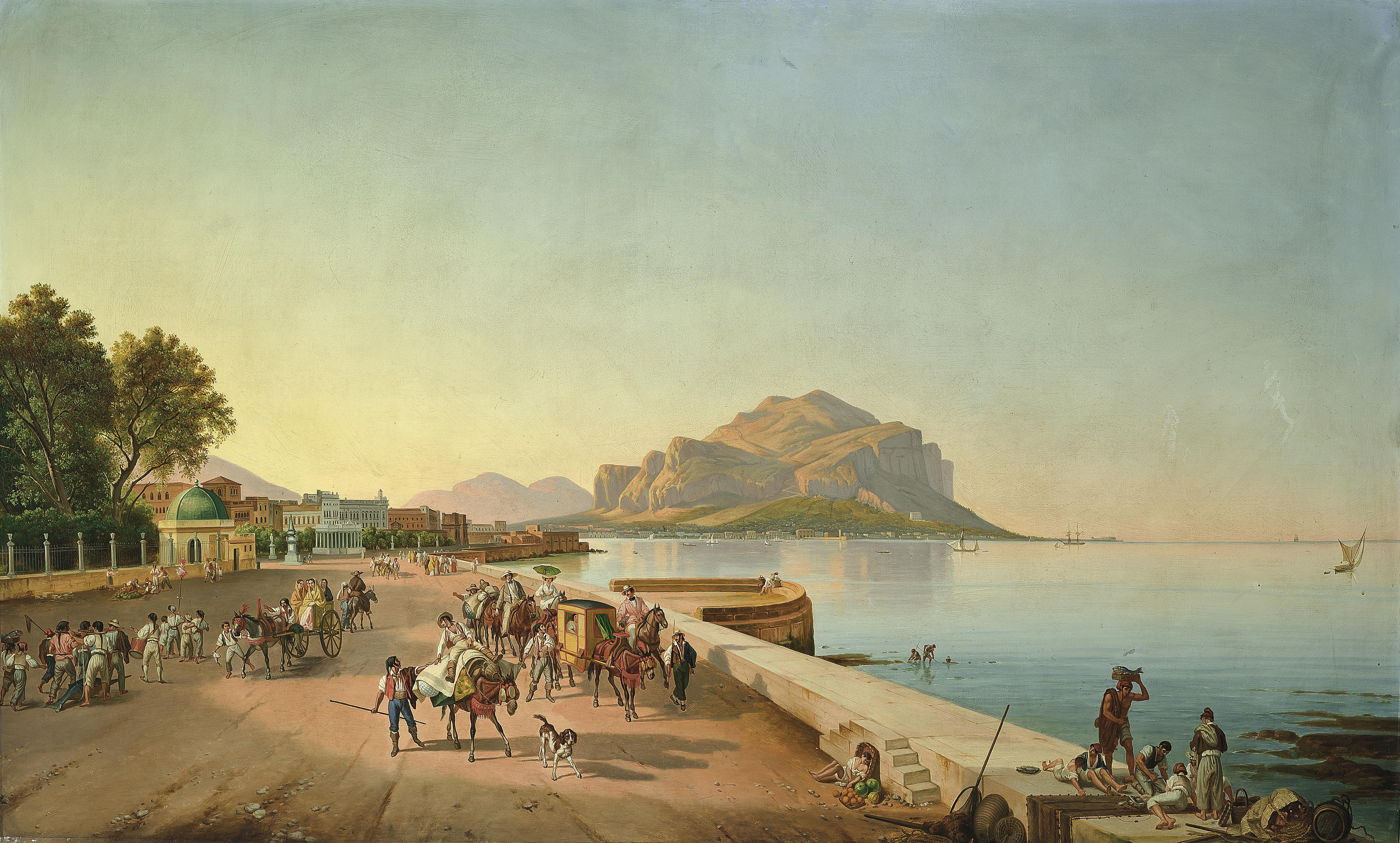
Palermo in the 19th century

After the Treaty of Utrecht (1713), Sicily was handed over to the Savoia, but in 1734 it was again a Bourbon possession. Charles III chose Palermo for his coronation as King of the Two Sicilies. Charles had new houses built for the increased population, while trade and industry grew as well. However, Palermo was now just another provincial city as the royal court resided in Naples. Charles' son Ferdinand, though disliked by the population, took refuge in Palermo after the event following the French Revolution in 1789.

From 1820 to 1848 all Sicily was shaken by upheavals, which culminated on January 12, 1848, with the popular insurrection led by Giuseppe La Masa, the first one in Europe that year. A parliament and constitution were proclaimed. The first president was Ruggero Settimo. The Bourbons soon reconquered Palermo (May 1849), which remained under their rule until the appearance of Giuseppe Garibaldi.

After the Siege of Palermo in May 1860, Garibaldi entered the city with his troops ("the Thousand"). After the plebiscite later that year Palermo and the whole of Sicily became part of the new Kingdom of Italy (1861).

== After the unification of Italy ==
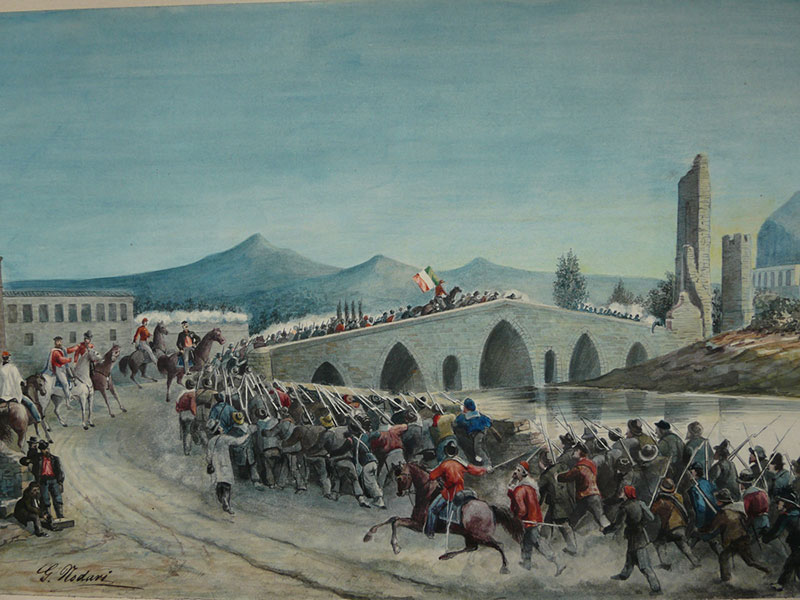
The thousand cross the "Admiral's Bridge" in Palermo.

From that year onwards, Palermo followed the history of Italy as the administrative centre of Sicily. A certain economic and industrial growth was spurred by the Florio family. In the early 20th century Palermo expanded outside the old city walls, mostly to the north along the new boulevard, the Via della Libertà. This road would soon boast a huge number of villas in the Art Nouveau style or Stile Liberty as it is known in Italy. Many of these were built by the famous architect Ernesto Basile. The Grand Hotel Villa Igeia, built by Ernesto Basile for the Florio family, is a good example of Palermitan Stile Liberty. The Teatro Massimo was built in the same period by Basile and his son and was opened in 1897.

During World War II, Palermo was untouched until the Allies began to advance up Italy after the Allied invasion of Sicily in 1943. In July, the harbour and the surrounding quarters were heavily bombed by the allied forces and were all but destroyed. Six decades later, the city centre has still not been fully rebuilt, and hollow walls and devastated buildings are commonplace.

In 1946, the city was declared the seat of the Regional Parliament, as capital of a Special Status Region (1947) whose seat is in the Palazzo dei Normanni. Palermo's future seemed to look bright again. Unfortunately, many opportunities were lost in the coming decades, due to incompetence, incapacity, corruption and abuse of power.

The main topic of the contemporary age is the struggle against the Mafia and bandits like Salvatore Giuliano, who controlled the neighbouring area of Montelepre. The Italian State had to share effective control, economic as well as the administrative, of the territory with the Mafiosi families.

The so-called "Sack of Palermo" is one of the major visible faces of this problem. The term is used today to indicate the heavy building speculations that filled the city with poor buildings. The reduced importance of agriculture in the Sicilian economy had led to a massive migration to the cities, especially Palermo, which swelled in size. Instead of rebuilding the city centre the town was thrown into a frantic expansion towards the north, where practically a new town was built. The regulatory plan for the expansion was largely ignored. New parts of town appeared almost out of nowhere, but without parks, schools, public buildings, proper roads and the other amenities that characterise a modern city. the Mafia played a huge role in this process, which was an important element in the Mafia's transition from a mostly rural phenomenon into a modern criminal organisation. The Mafia took advantage of corrupt city officials (a former mayor of Palermo, Vito Ciancimino, has been condemned for his bribery with Mafiosi) and protection coming from the Italian central government itself.

Many civil servants lost their life in the struggle against the criminal organisations of Palermo and Sicily. These include the Carabinieri general Carlo Alberto Dalla Chiesa, the region's president Piersanti Mattarella, Pino Puglisi, a priest, and magistrates such as Giovanni Falcone and Paolo Borsellino. The latter was killed, together with five members of his escort, in a massive car bombing in Via D'Amelio in Palermo, in July 1992. As of 2012, this has been the last bloodbath in Palermo ordered by the Mafia.

== 21st century ==
Today, Palermo is a city of 720,000 inhabitants still struggling to recover from the devastation of the Second World War and the damage caused by decades of uncontrolled urban growth. Situated on one of the most beautiful promontories of the Mediterranean, Palermo is an important trading and business centre and the seat of a university frequented by many students from Islamic countries, as the city's relationship with the Muslim world never ceased.

Palermo is connected to the mainland through an international airport and an increasing number of maritime links. However, land connections remain poor. This and other reasons have until now thwarted the development of tourism. This has been identified as the main resource to exploit for the city's recovery, the marvellous legacy of three millennia of history and folklore.

== See also ==
- Timeline of Palermo
