= Bonaria =

Bonaria may refer to:

== Places ==
- Bonaria, Cagliari, a hill and neighborhood in Cagliari, Sardinia, Italy
  - Basilica of Our Lady of Bonaria, a Roman Catholic basilica in Bonaria, Cagliari
  - Shrine of Our Lady of Bonaria, a Roman Catholic basilica in Bonaria, Cagliari
  - Monumental Cemetery of Bonaria, a Roman Catholic cemetery in Bonaria, Cagliari

== People ==
- Bonaria Manca (1925–2020), Italian naïve painter

== Other uses ==
- Cruise Bonaria, an Italian high speed ferry
