= Churches in Cagliari =

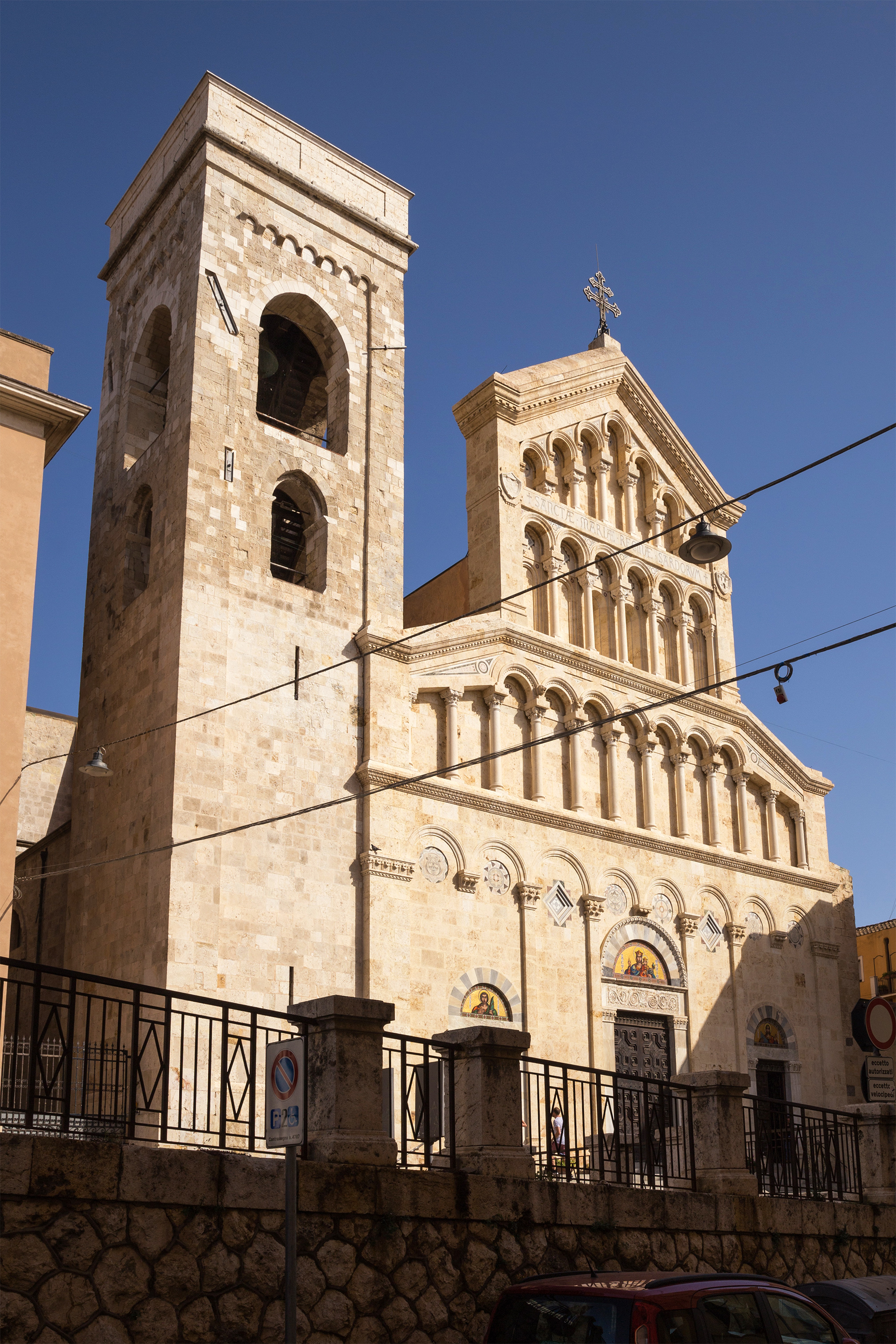
Cagliari Cathedral, the main church of the city and the archdiocese

The churches of Cagliari, in addition to being the Christian places of worship in Cagliari, the regional capital of Sardinia, also represent—especially some of them—a portion of the historical, artistic, and cultural heritage of the city.

These are primarily places of worship for Catholicism, among which are the cathedral of the Archdiocese of Cagliari and the minor basilica of Our Lady of Bonaria, the most important churches in the city.

This heritage includes buildings ranging from the 5th century, when the Basilica of San Saturnino (the oldest in the city) was built, to the present day, passing through a wide variety of artistic styles—expressions of the tastes and foreign rules that have characterized the history of the Sardinian capital.
The Romanesque is represented in San Saturnino, Pisan Romanesque–Gothic in the Cathedral, Catalan Gothic in the Church of the Purissima, sixteenth-century Classicism in the Church of Saint Augustine, Spanish Baroque architecture in San Michele, Piedmontese late-Baroque in Sant'Efisio, and neoclassicism in San Giovanni di Dio, to name a few examples.

Regarding the 20th century, particularly interesting are the Church of San Domenico and the Church of the Holy Martyrs George and Catherine, built after the destruction of the original ones during World War II, which are still linked to the reworking of models from the past.

Of a more modern conception are churches such as the Santissimo Crocifisso and San Sebastiano, characterized by a lean style focused more on functionality than aesthetics, built with extensive use of reinforced concrete.

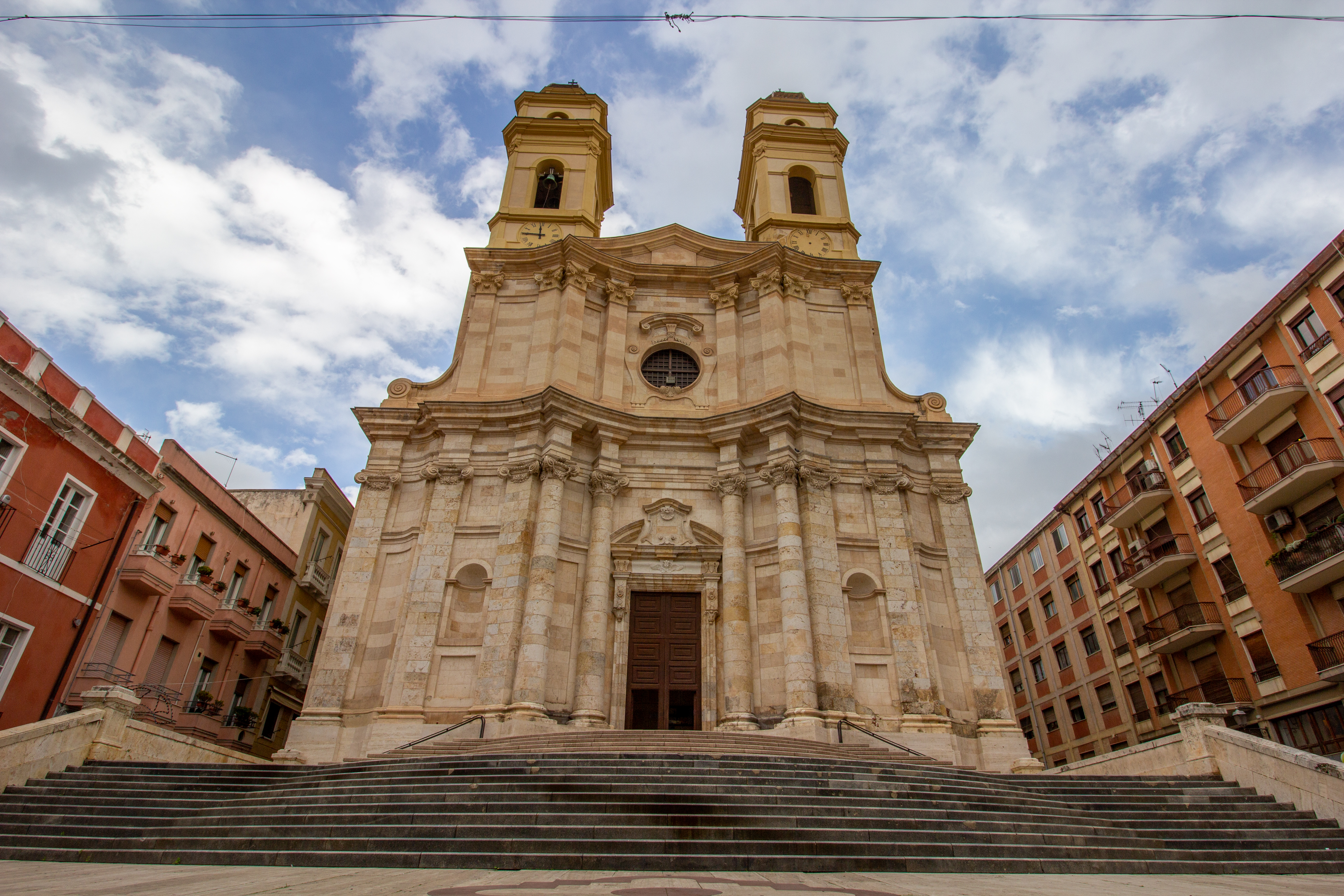
The parish church of Sant'Anna

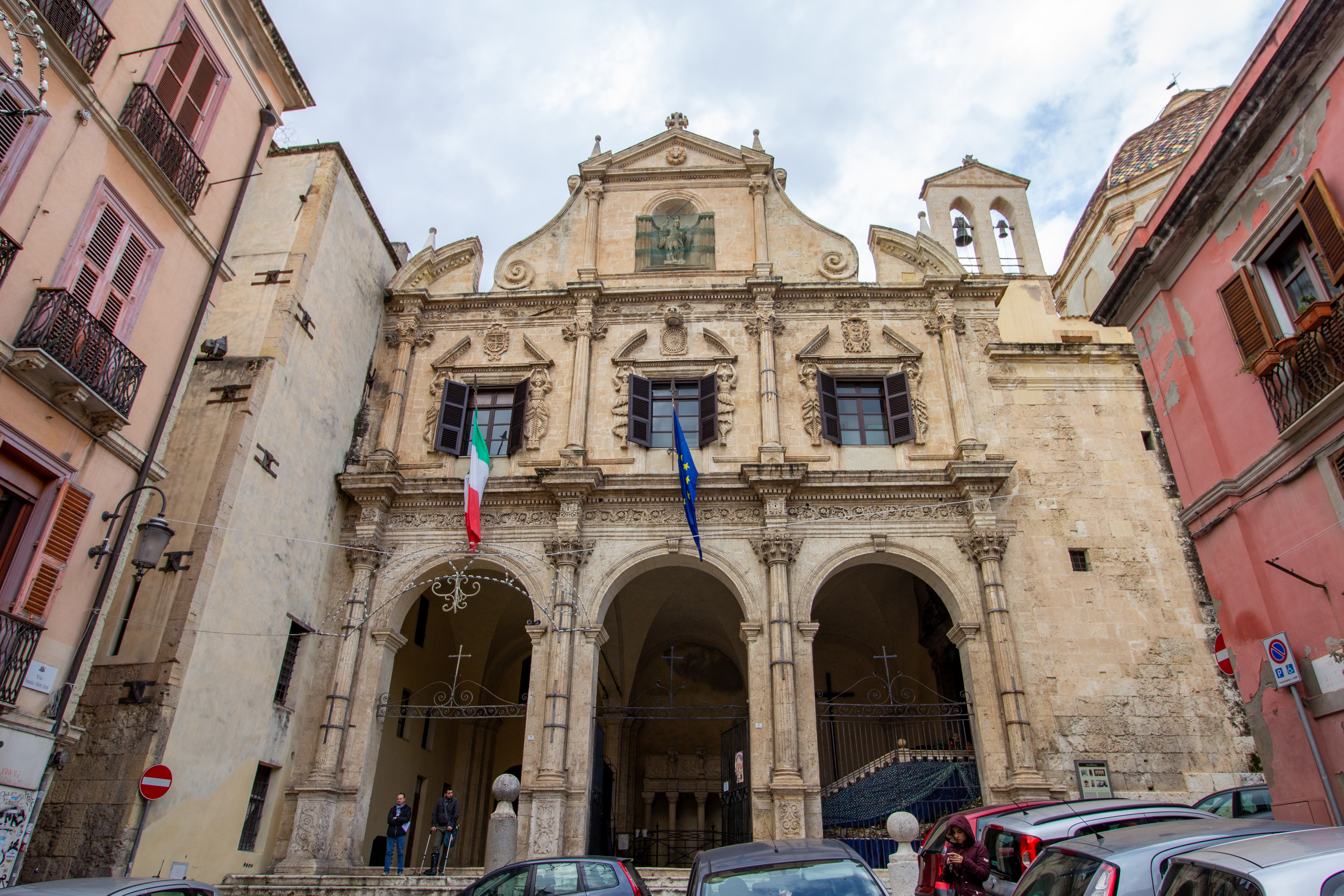
Church of San Michele

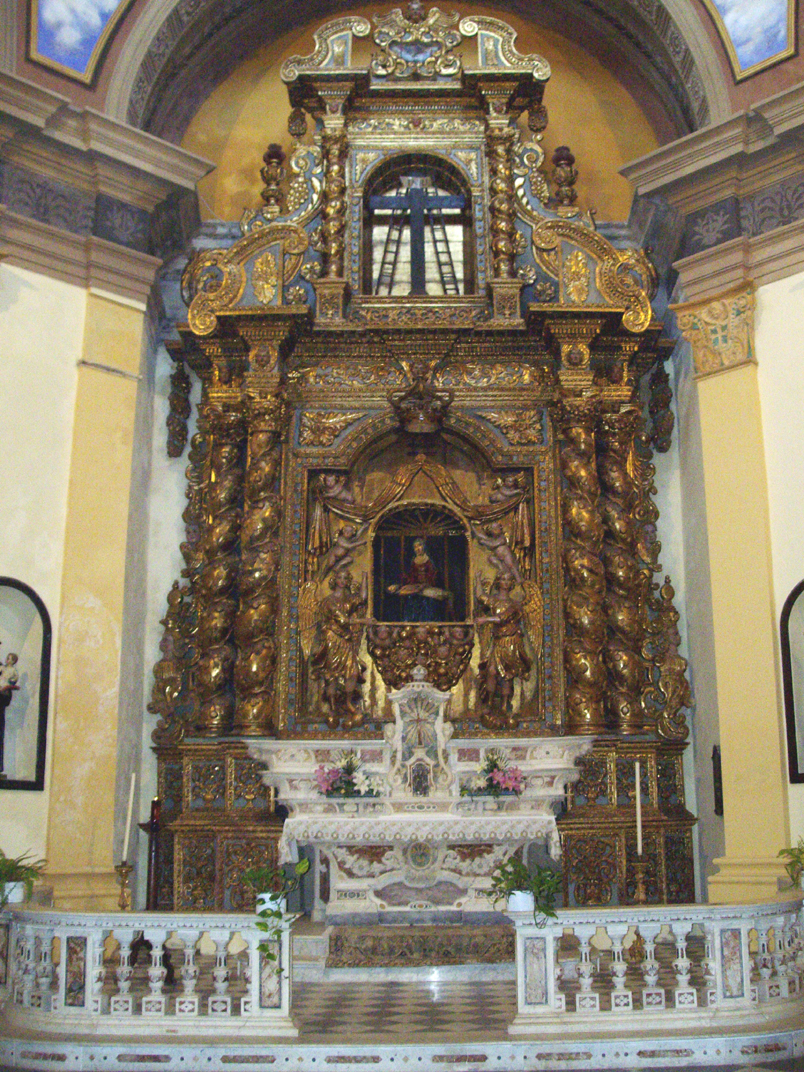
Church of San Sepolcro, gilded wooden altarpiece in the Chapel of the Pietà

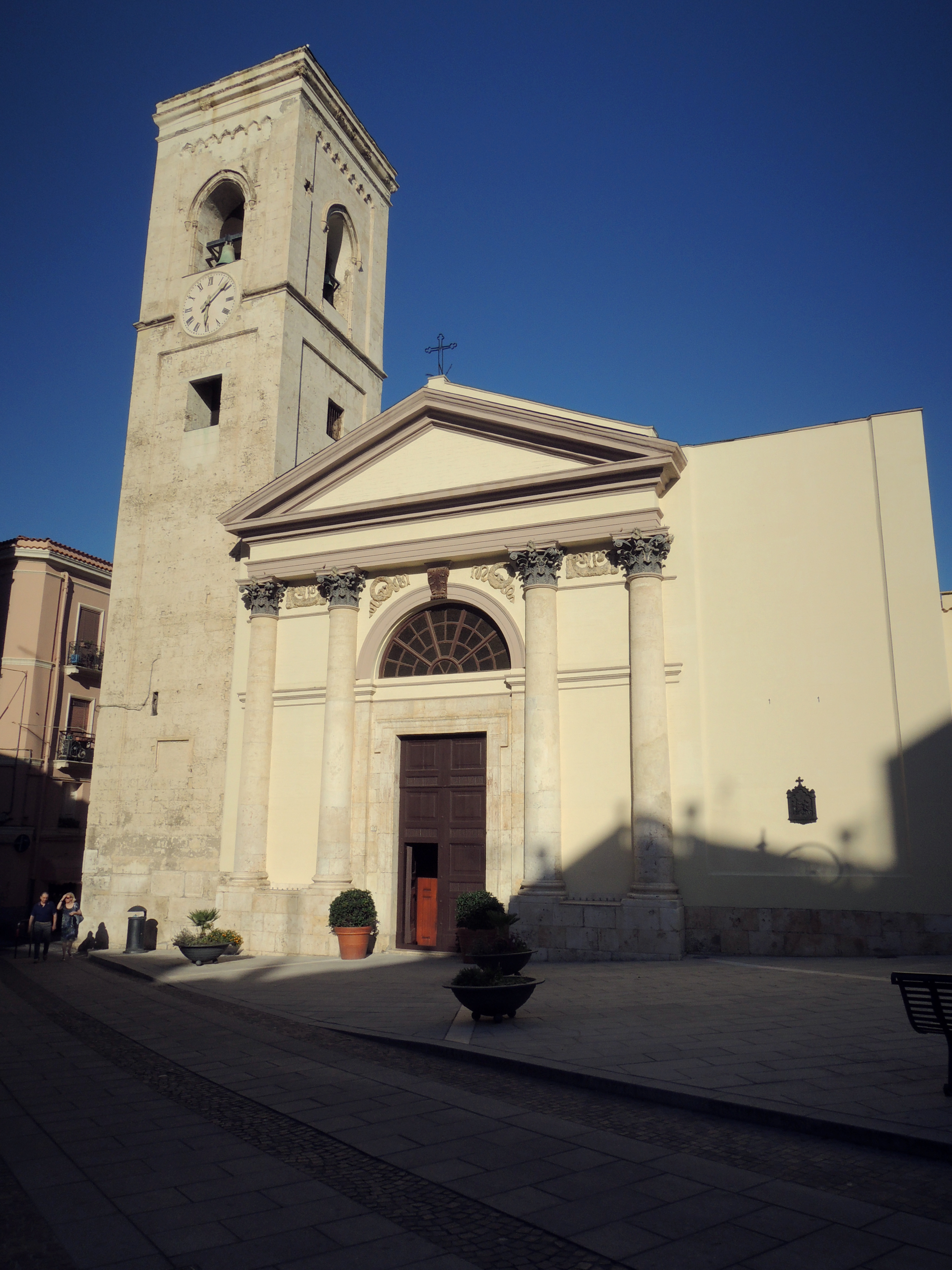
Collegiate Church of San Giacomo, in the historic Villanova district

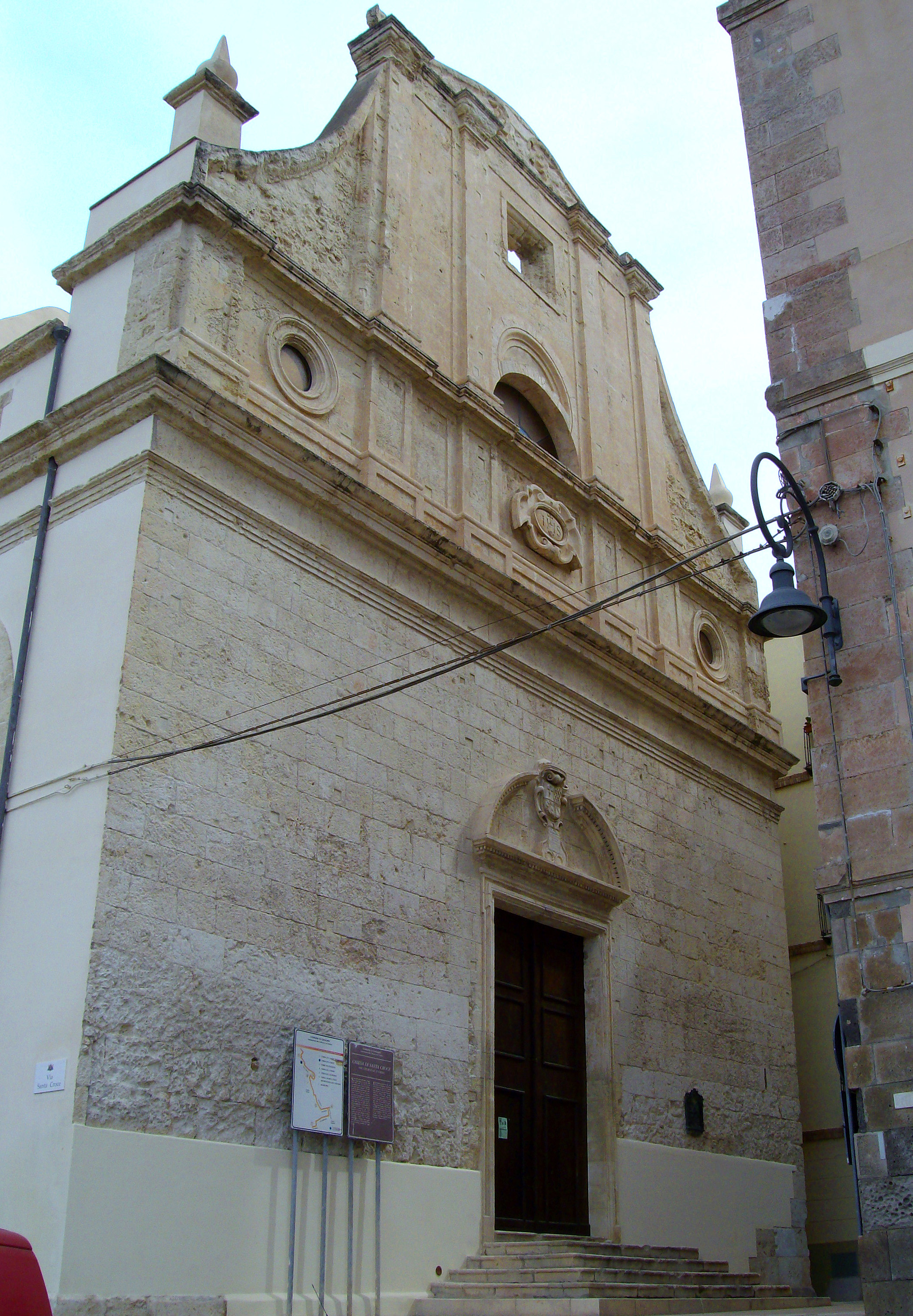
Basilica of the Holy Cross

== Vicariate of the Cathedral ==
The territory of the first vicariate largely corresponds to the city's historic center; in this area, the four oldest established parishes are found: Santa Cecilia, Sant'Anna, Sant'Eulalia, and San Giacomo, in their respective districts of Castello, Stampace, Marina, and Villanova.

=== Parish of Santa Cecilia in Castello ===
Parish Church: Cathedral of Santa Maria, located in Piazza Palazzo

- Church of the Purissima, Via Lamarmora
- Church of Saint Lucy, Via Martini
- Church of Saint Joseph Calasanzio, Piazzetta San Giuseppe
- Church of Santa Maria del Monte, Via Corte d'Appello
- Church of Hope, Via Duomo
- Church of Saint Lawrence, Buoncammino Hill, Stampace district

=== Parish of Sant'Anna in Stampace ===
Parish Church: Collegiate Church of Saint Anne, in Via Azuni

- Church of Sant'Efisio, Via Sant'Efisio
- Church of Santa Restituta, Via Sant'Efisio
- Church of Saint Michael, Via Ospedale
- Church of Saint Anthony of Padua, Viale Fra Ignazio da Làconi
- Chapel of the Salesian Institute, Viale Fra Ignazio da Làconi
- Chapel of the Institute for the Blind, Via Nicolodi
- Church of Saint Clare, Scalette Santa Chiara
- Oratory of Saint Joseph, Via Santa Margherita
- Crypt of Saint Augustine, Largo Carlo Felice

=== Parish of Sant'Eulalia in Marina ===
Parish Church: Collegiate Church of Saint Eulalia, Via Collegio

- Church of the Holy Sepulchre, Piazza San Sepolcro
- Church of Saint Anthony Abbot, Via Manno
- Church of the Pietà, Scalette Monache Cappuccine
- Church of Saint Rosalia, Via Torino
- Church of Saint Francis of Paola, Via Roma
- Church of Saint Augustine, Via Baylle
- Chapel of the Marina Nursery, former Oratory of the Madonna d'Itria, Via Baylle
- Church of Santa Teresa (deconsecrated), now the seat of the Municipal Auditorium

=== Parish of San Giacomo in Villanova ===
Parish Church: Collegiate Church of Saint James, Piazza San Giacomo

- Church and Crypt of Saint Dominic, Piazza San Domenico
- Church of Saint John the Baptist, Via San Giovanni
- Church of the Crucifix, Piazza San Giacomo
- Oratory of the Souls, Piazza San Giacomo
- Church of Saint Vincent de Paul, Via Bosa
- Church of Saint Roch, Piazza San Rocco
- Church of San Cesello, Via San Giovanni

=== Parish of the Santissima Annunziata ===
Parish Church: Most Holy Annunciation, Corso Vittorio Emanuele, Stampace district

- Church of Saint Peter of the Fishermen, Viale Trieste, Stampace district

=== Parish of the Blessed Virgin of Carmine ===
Parish Church: Blessed Virgin of Carmine, Viale Trieste, Stampace district

- Chapel of the Railway Station, Piazza Matteotti

=== Parish of Our Lady of Fatima ===
Parish Church: Located at the Nursery Chapel, Piazza Nostra Signora di Fatima, Giorgino

- Chapel of Sant'Efisio, at Villa Ballero, Viale Pula, Giorgino
- Chapel of the former Youth Detention Center, Viale Pula, Giorgino

=== Personal Parish of Santa Croce ===
Parish Church: Basilica of the Holy Cross, Scalette Santa Croce, Castello district

=== Chaplaincy of San Giovanni di Dio ===
Parish Church: Chapel of the "San Giovanni di Dio" Civil Hospital, Via Ospedale, Stampace district

== Vicariate of San Lucifero ==
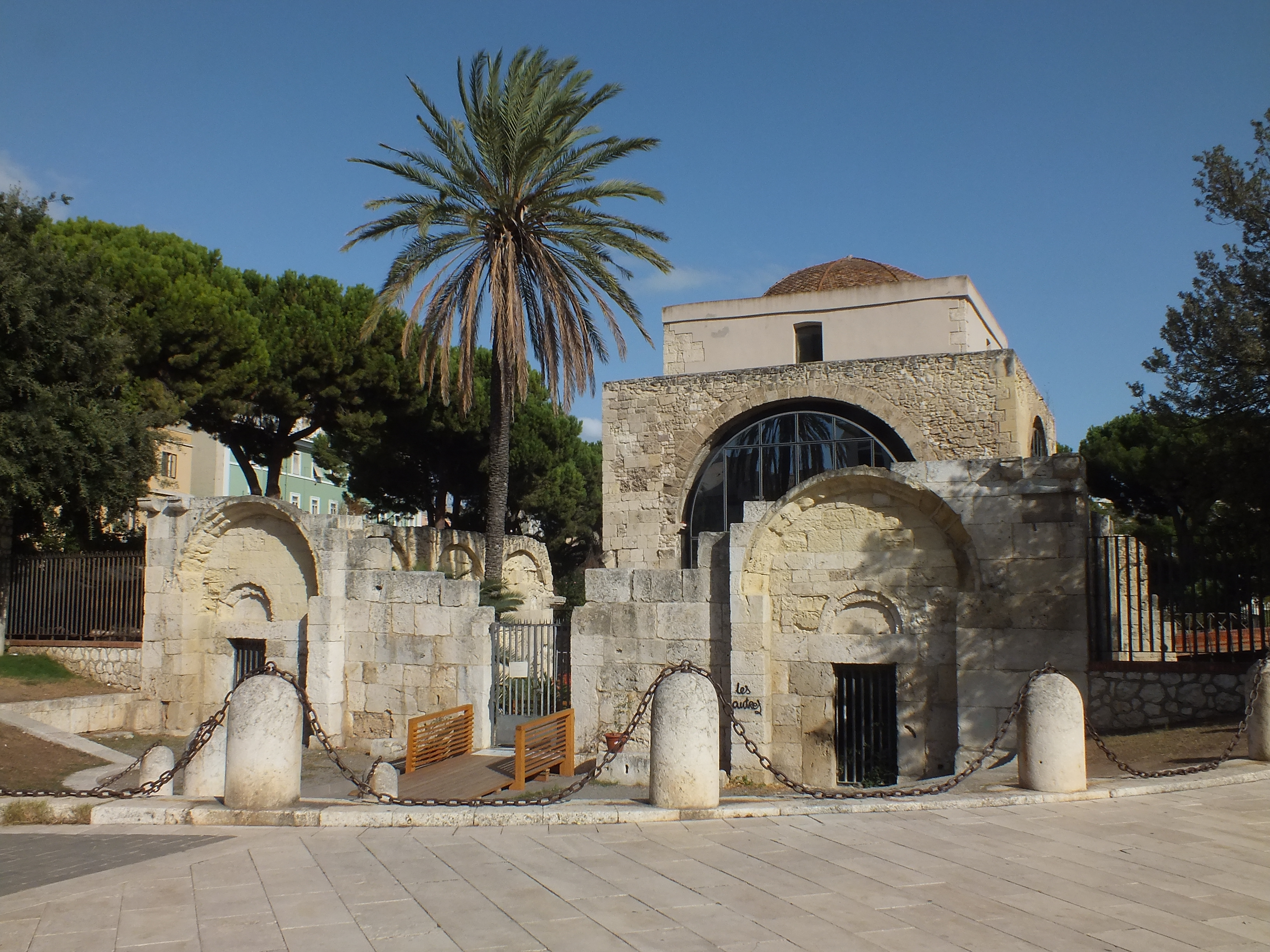
Basilica of San Saturnino: the oldest church in Cagliari

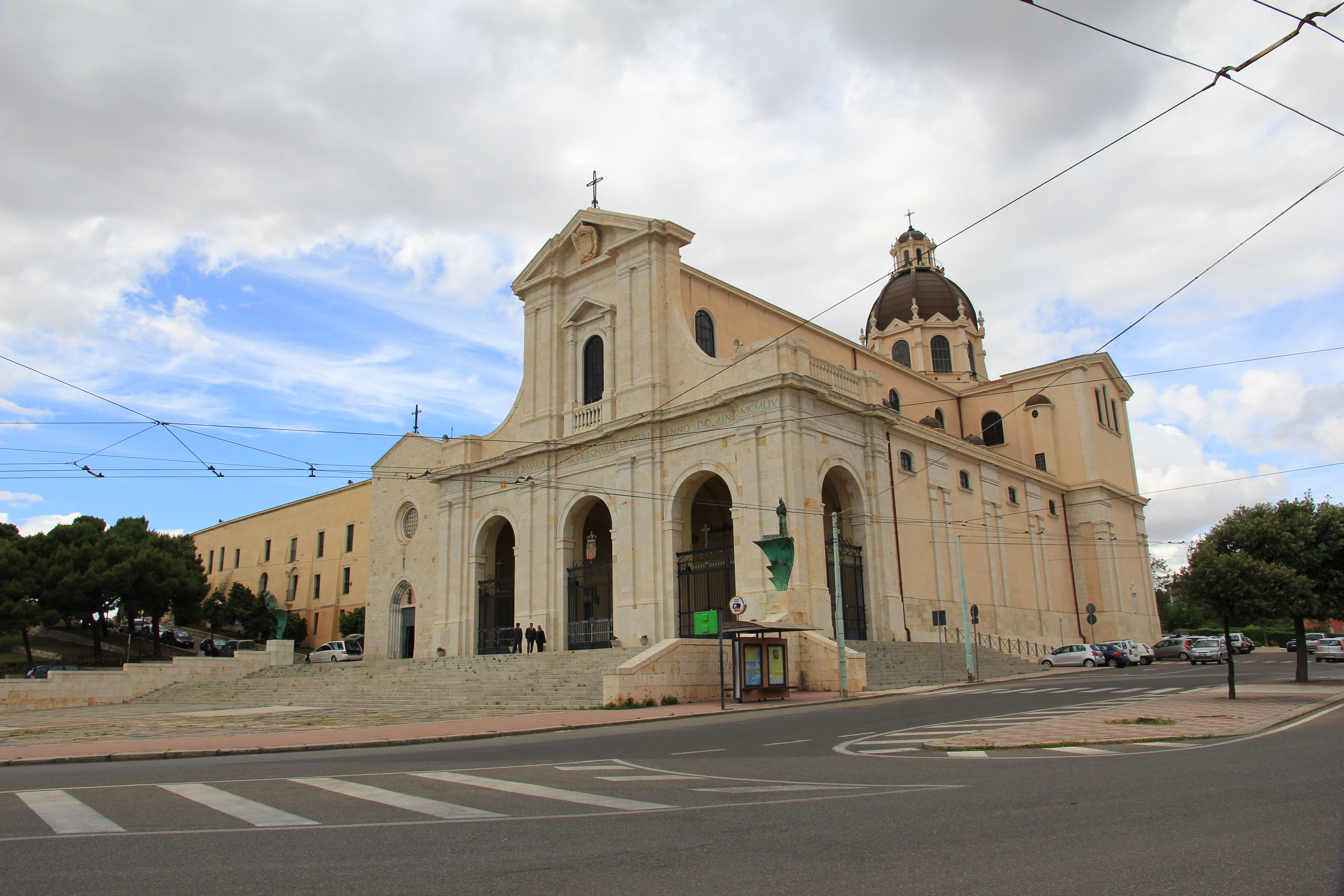
Sanctuary and Basilica of Bonaria, minor basilica since 1926

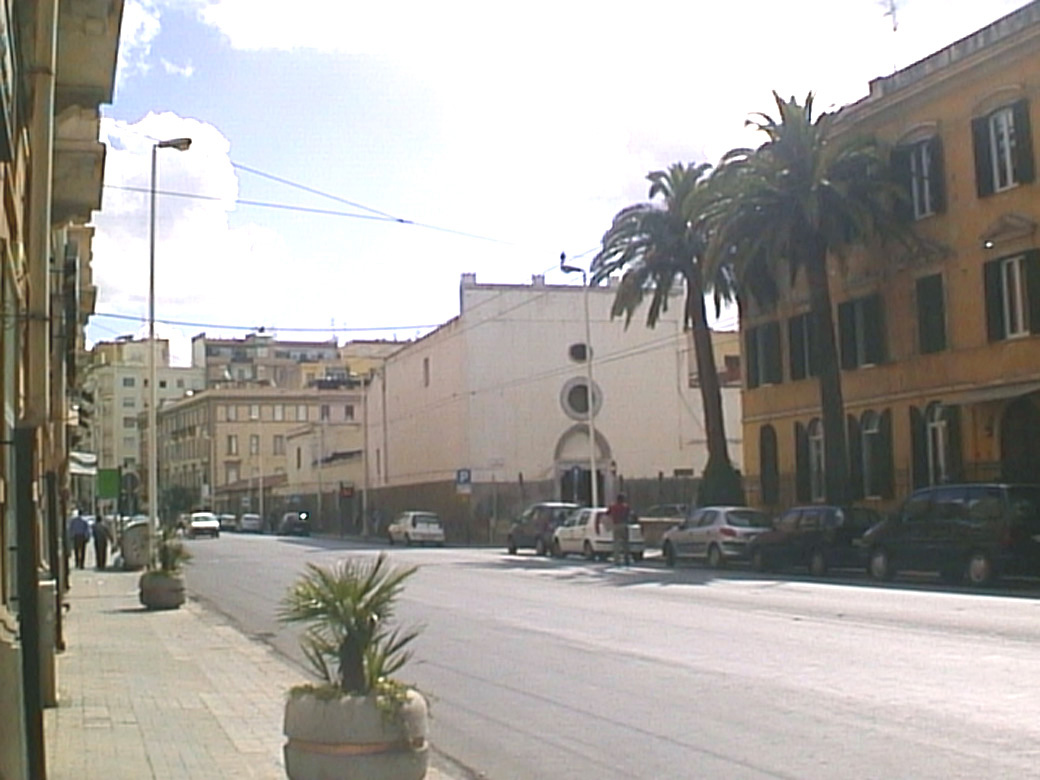
Via San Benedetto, with the church of the same name

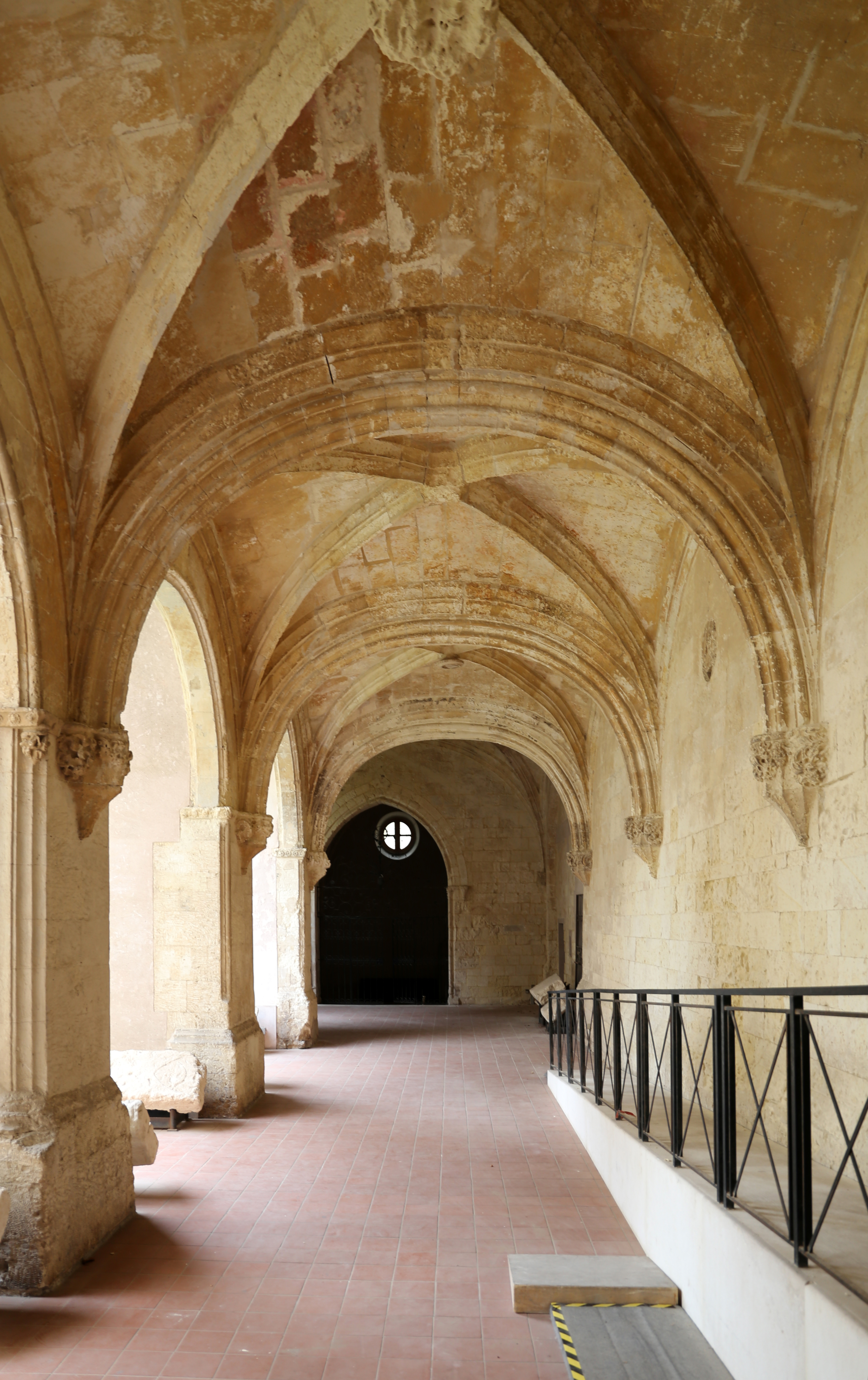
Cloister of San Domenico

=== Parish of the Blessed Virgin of Rimedio ===
Parish Church: Saint Lucifer, Via San Lucifero, Villanova district

- Basilica of San Saturnino, Piazza San Cosimo, Villanova district

=== Parish of Our Lady of Bonaria ===
Parish Church: Basilica and Sanctuary of Our Lady of Bonaria, Piazza Bonaria, Bonaria district

=== Parish of San Benedetto ===
Parish Church: Santa Lucia, Via Donizetti, San Benedetto district

- Church of Saint Benedict, Via Verdi, San Benedetto district

=== Parish of Saints George and Catherine ===
Parish Church: Holy Martyrs George and Catherine, Via Scano, Monte Urpinu district

- Church of Christ the King, Via Scano, Monte Urpinu district. Designed by Giuliana Genta and Silvano Panzarasa.
- Church of the Madonna del Rosario (of the City Adoration), Via Vidal, Monte Urpinu district
- Aragonese Church (deconsecrated), Via Leo, Monte Urpinu district

=== Parish of the Santissimo Crocifisso ===
Parish Church: Most Holy Crucifix, Via Zagabria, Genneruxi district

=== Parish of San Pio X ===
Parish Church: Saint Pius X, Via della Pineta, Monte Mixi district

=== Parish of San Bartolomeo ===
Parish Church: Saint Bartholomew, Viale Calamosca, San Bartolomeo district

=== Parish of Sant'Elia ===
Parish Church: Saint Elias, Borgo Sant'Elia

=== Parish of the Santissimo Nome di Maria ===
Parish Church: Most Holy Name of Mary, Via Favonio, La Palma

- Church of the Salt Workers (Salinieri), Viale La Palma, La Palma

=== Parish of the Virgin of Health ===
Parish Church: Virgin of Health, Via Ausonia, Poetto district

=== Parish of San Carlo Borromeo ===
Parish Church: Saint Charles Borromeo, Via San Carlo Borromeo

=== Parish of San Paolo ===
Parish Church: Saint Paul, Piazza Giovanni XXIII, San Benedetto district

- Chapel of the Infanzia lieta school, Via Pintor, San Benedetto district

=== Parish of San Sebastiano ===
Parish Church: Saint Sebastian, Via Ignazio Serra, Fonsarda district

== Vicariate of Saints Peter and Paul ==
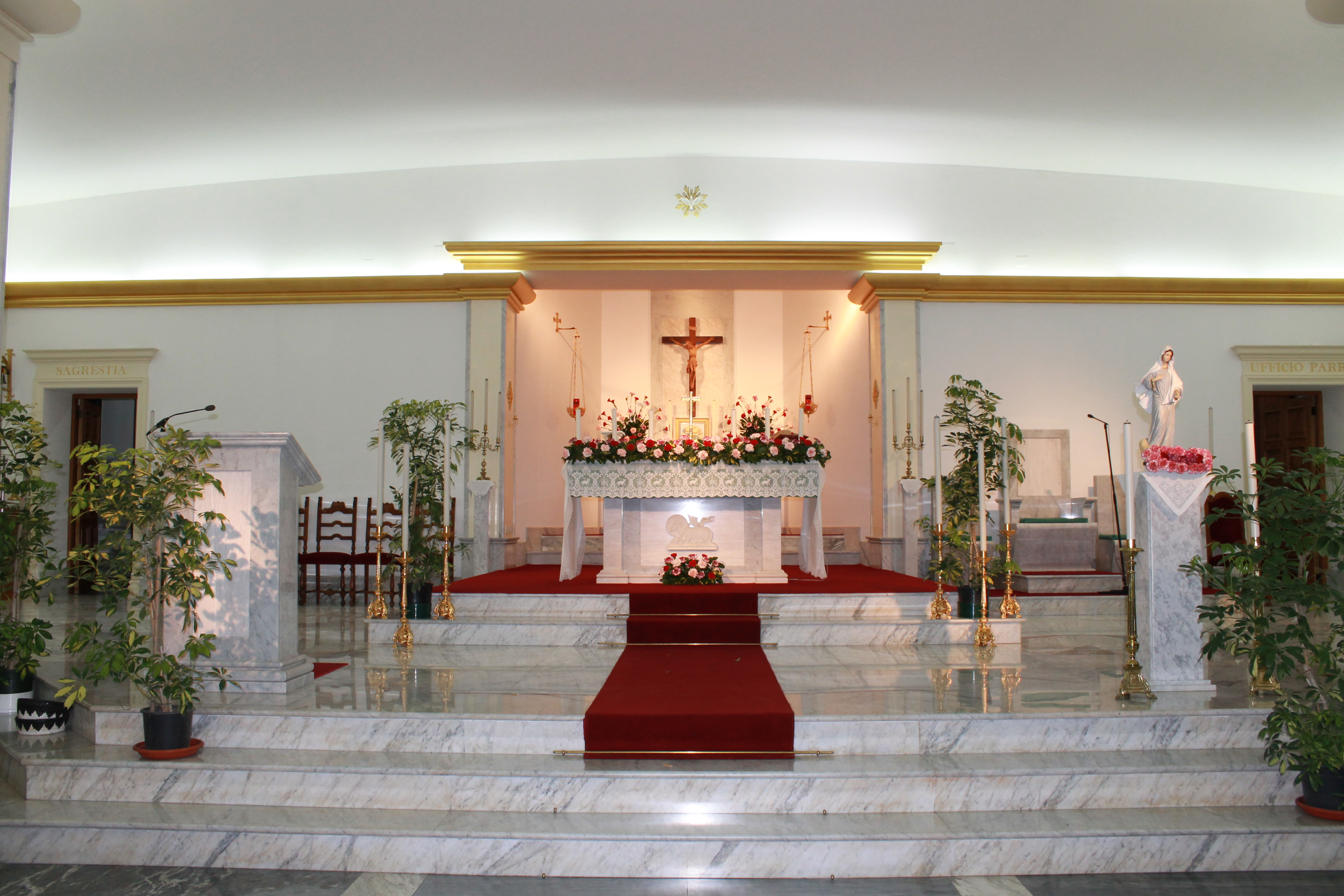
Saints Peter and Paul, Is Mirrionis

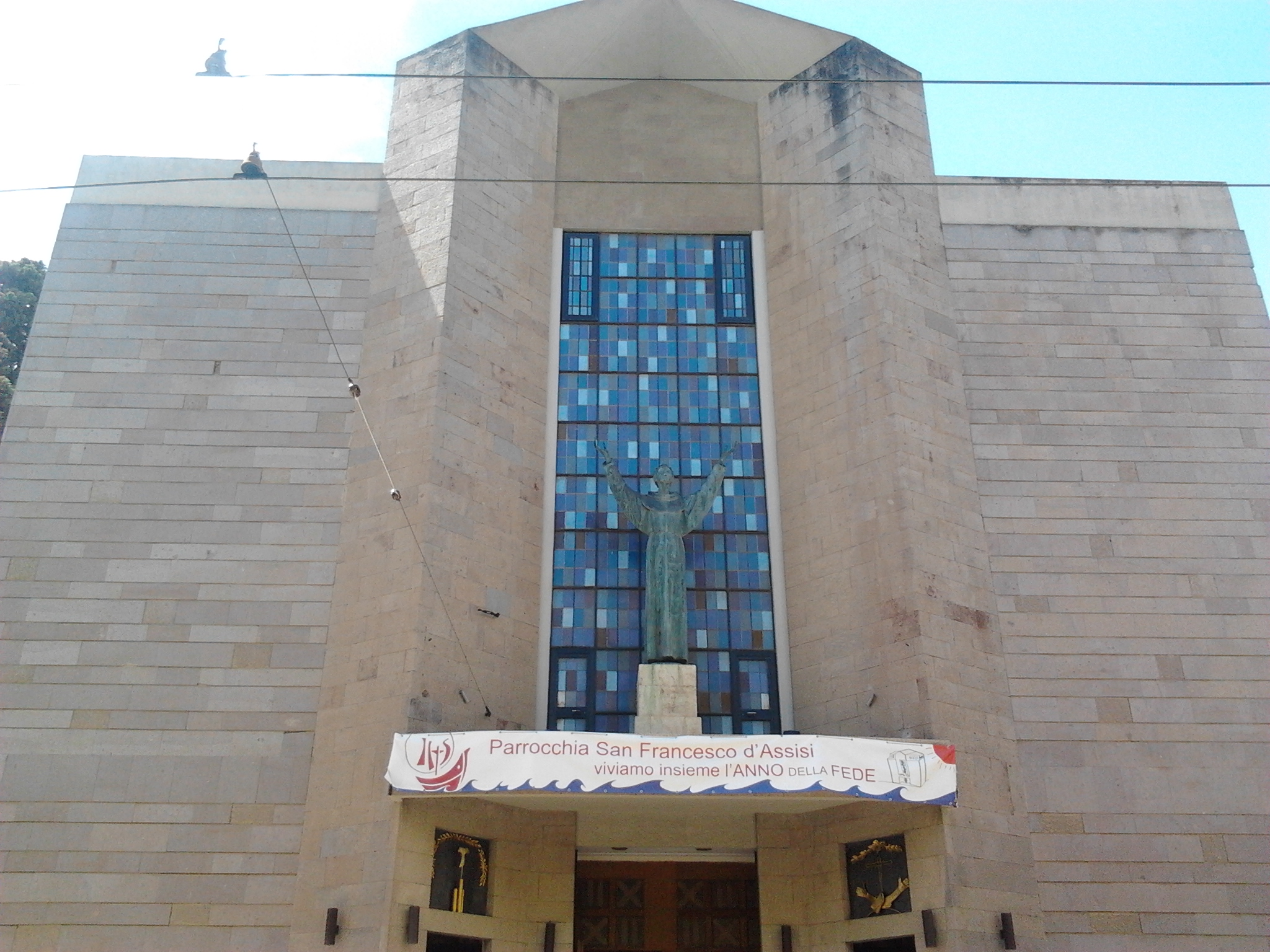
Saint Francis, La Vega

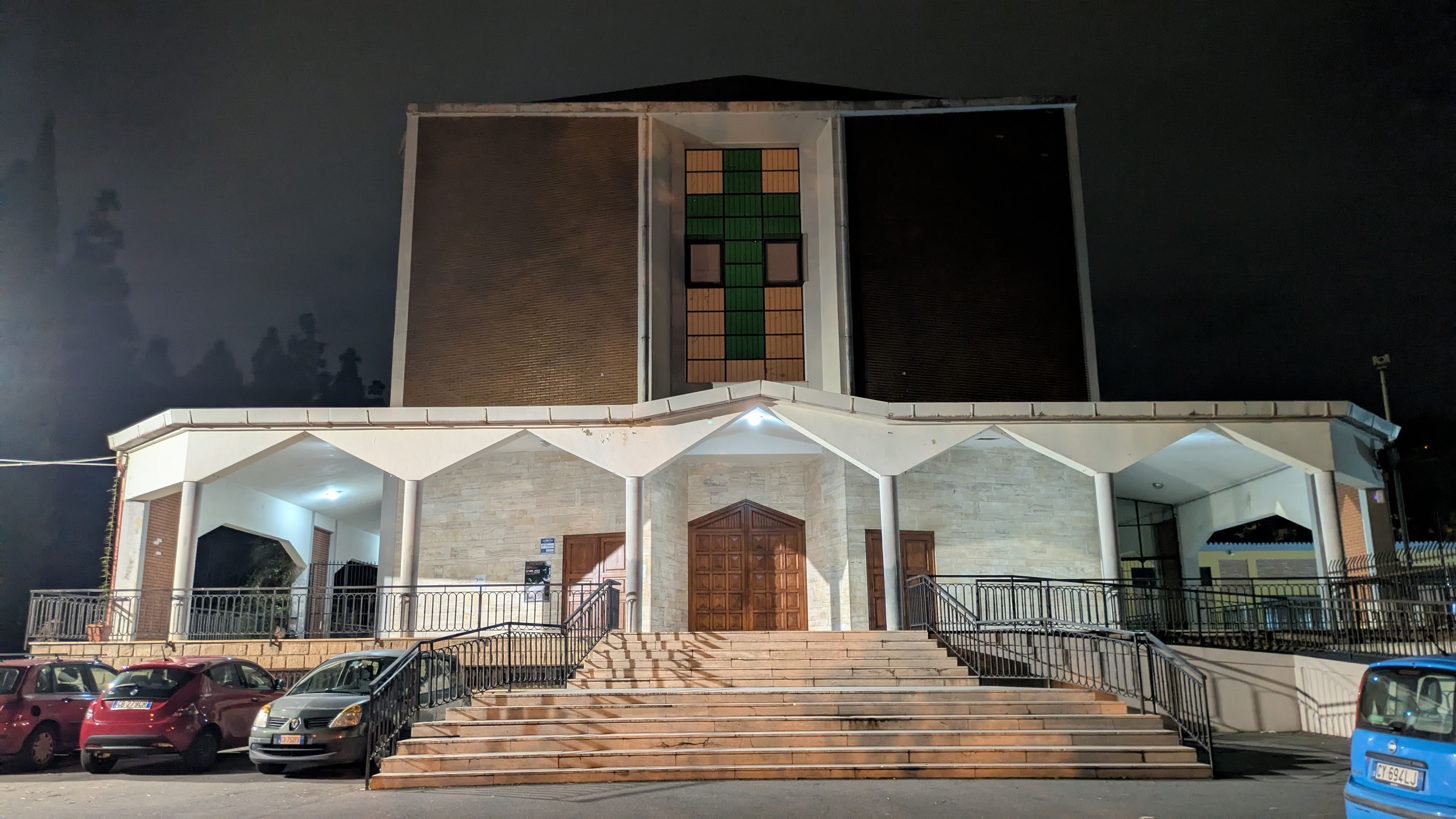
Saint Eusebius, Is Mirrionis

=== Parish of Saints Peter and Paul ===
Parish Church: Saints Peter and Paul, Via Is Mirrionis, Is Mirrionis district

=== Parish of Sant'Avendrace ===
Parish Church: Saint Avendrace, Viale Sant'Avendrace, Sant'Avendrace district

- Chapel of the Institute of the Handmaids of the Holy Family, Via Montello
- Church of Saint Simon, locality of Sa Illetta

=== Parish of the Miraculous Medal ===
Parish Church: Miraculous Medal, Piazza San Michele, San Michele district

=== Parish of Sant'Eusebio ===
Parish Church: Saint Eusebius, Via Quintino Sella, Is Mirrionis district

- Chapel of the Archiepiscopal Seminary of Cagliari, Via Mons. Cogoni
- Chapel of the Pontifical Regional Sardinian Seminary, Via Mons. Parraguez

=== Parish of San Francesco d'Assisi ===
Parish Church: Saint Francis of Assisi, Via Piemonte, La Vega district

- Church of Saint Maurus, Via San Giovanni, Villanova district
- Chapel of the Saint Vincent Institute, Viale San Vincenzo, La Vega district

=== Parish of Madonna della Strada ===
Parish Church: Our Lady of the Road, Via Crespellani, Mulinu Becciu district

=== Parish of San Massimiliano Kolbe ===
Parish Church: Saint Maximilian Kolbe, Via Cornalias

=== Parish of the Holy Spirit ===
Parish Church: Holy Spirit, Via de' Medici, Su Planu (Selargius)

== Vicariate of Pirri ==
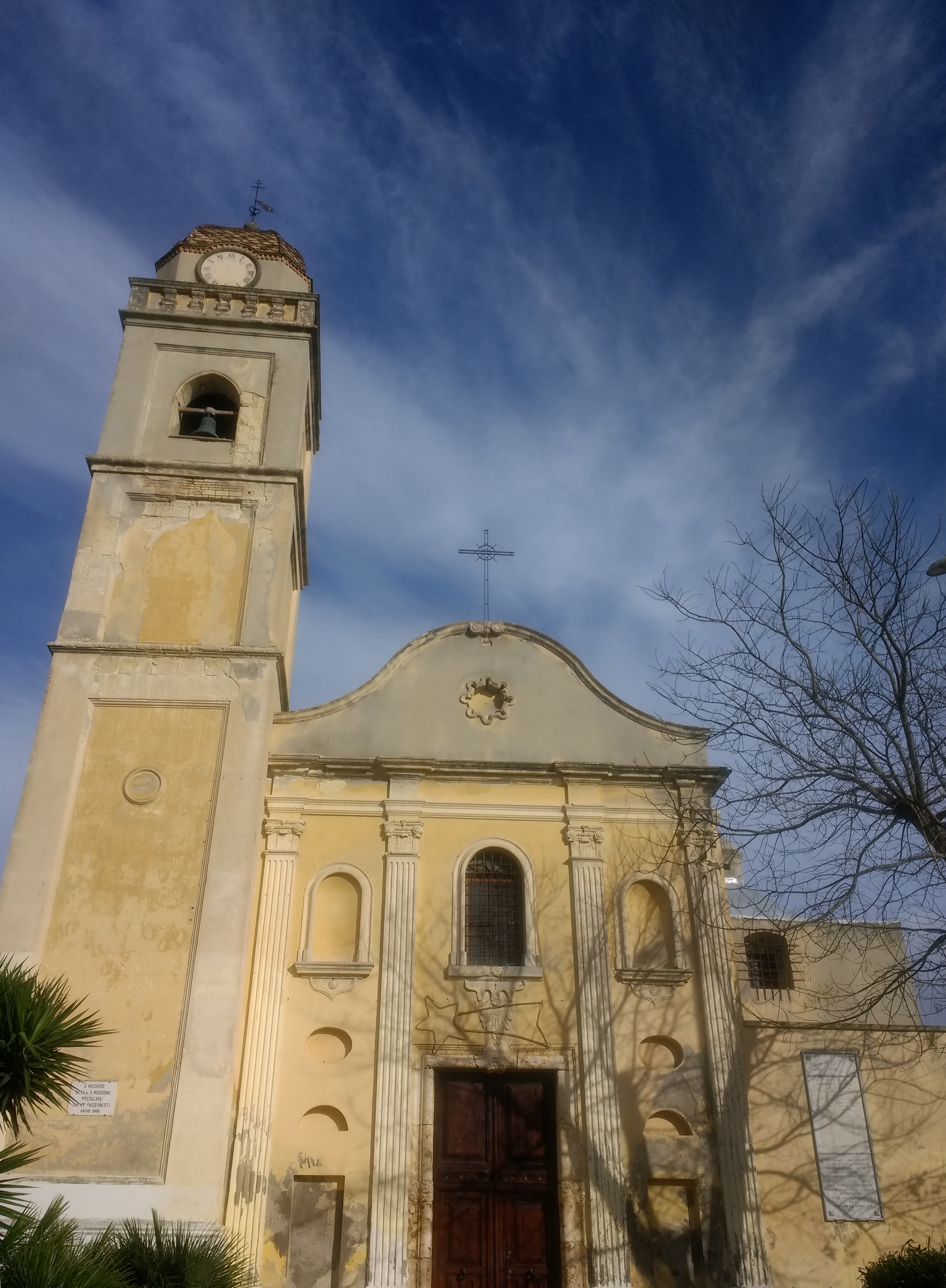
Saint Peter, Pirri

=== Parish of San Pietro ===
Parish Church: Saint Peter, Via Chiesa

- Church of Santa Rosalia

=== Parish of Madonna della Fede ===
Parish Church: Our Lady of Faith, Via Marzabotto

=== Parish of San Giuseppe ===
Parish Church: Saint Joseph, Via Toti

=== Parish of San Gregorio Magno ===
Parish Church: Saint Gregory the Great, Via del Borghetto

=== Parish of San Tarcisio ===
Parish Church: Saint Tarcisius Martyr, Via Goceano

=== Parish of Santa Maria del Suffragio ===
Parish Church: Our Lady of Suffrage, Via Flavio Gioia, CEP district

- Church of Sant'Alenixedda (deconsecrated), Via Parigi, European District

== Disappeared Churches ==
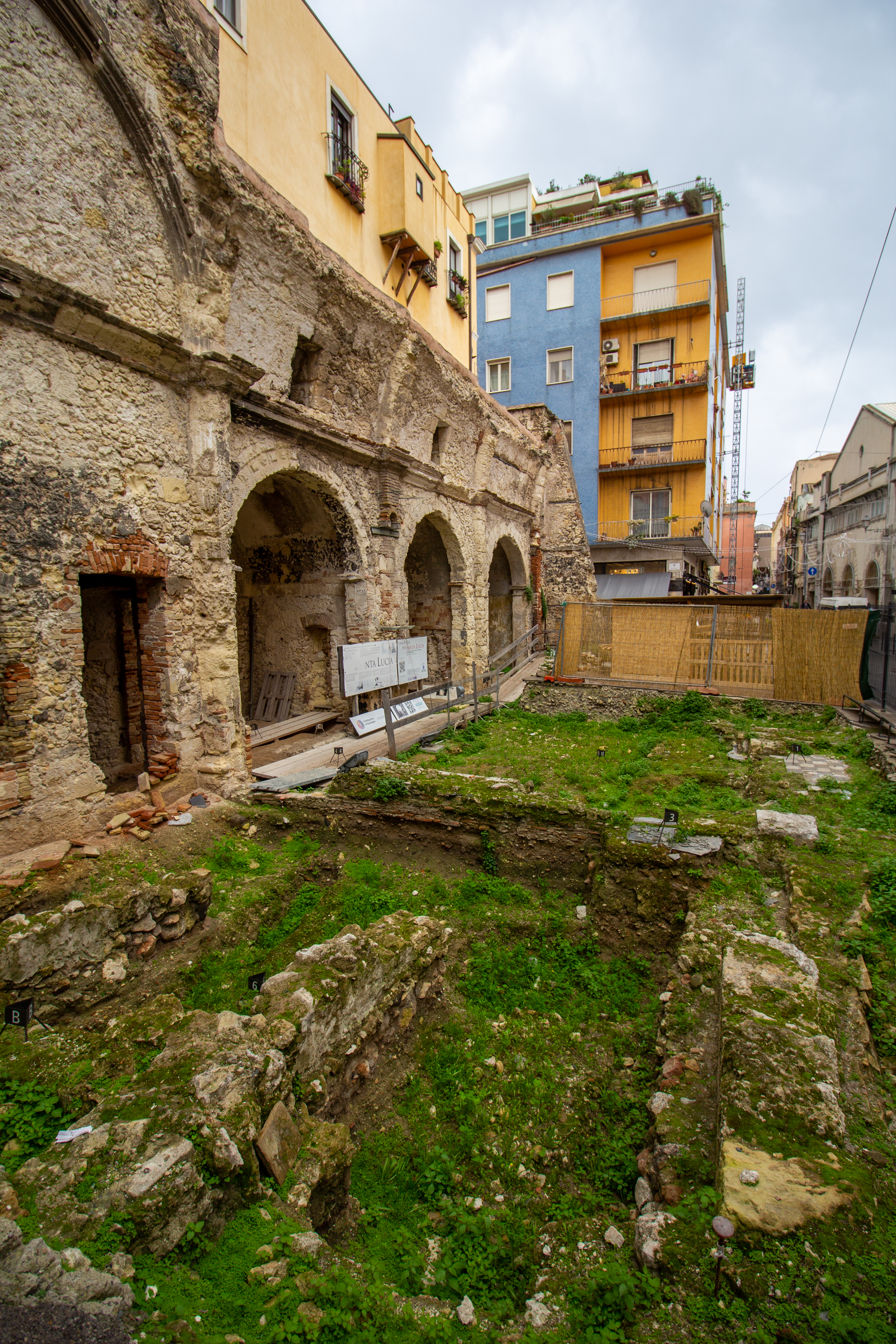
Remains of the Church of Santa Lucia della Marina

- Cathedral of Santa Igia, in the capital of the same name of the Judicate of Cagliari;
- Santa Barbara, in the current Citadel of Museums, the facade remains;
- Saint Bardilius, in the current square of the Monumental Cemetery of Bonaria; existed since the 10th or 11th century, closed to worship in the 19th, collapsed in 1909 and demolished in 1929;
- Saint Bernard, in the current Corso Vittorio Emanuele II;
- Saint Elias, on the promontory of the same name;
- Saint Francis of Stampace, built in 1275 and demolished in 1871;
- Old church of Saints George and Catherine, in Via Manno, demolished following the WW II bombings;
- Saint George the Bishop, in the current Via Fara;
- Saint George (or Saint Francis, Saint Michael, or Saint Peter), in the current Via Mandrolisai, dating back to the 17th century;
- Santa Lucia della Marina, Via Sardegna, demolished following the WWII bombings;
- Santa Maria Chiara, near the Monte Claro Park, demolished in the 20th century;
- Santa Margherita, in the current Via Santa Margherita, Stampace district;
- San Michele, incorporated into the Castle of San Michele;
- San Nicolò dei Napoletani, near the current Piazza del Carmine;
- Saint Paul, in the locality of the same name;
- Saint Peter, in the current Via Liguria;
- Virgin of Lluc, Piazza San Bartolomeo.

== Bibliography ==
- Antioco Piseddu. Le chiese di Cagliari. Cagliari, Zonza Editori, 2000. ISBN 8884700302

== See also ==
- Church (building)
- Archdiocese of Cagliari
- Cagliari
