= Giuseppina Nicoli =

Italian nun (1863–1924)

Blessed Giuseppina Nicoli DC
- Born: 18 November 1863; Casatisma, Pavia, Kingdom of Italy
- Died: 31 December 1924 (aged 61); Cagliari, Kingdom of Italy
- Venerated in: Roman Catholic Church
- Beatified: 3 February 2008, Basilica di Nostra Signora di Bonaria, Cagliari, Italy by Cardinal José Saraiva Martins
- Feast: 3 February

Giuseppina Nicoli, DC (18 November 1863 – 31 December 1924) was an Italian Catholic member of the Daughters of Charity of Saint Vincent de Paul who served as a catechist in Sardinia. She held several positions of leadership in Turin and elsewhere.

Her cause for canonization was started under Pope Paul VI in 1966, and she was declared venerable by Pope Benedict XVI in 2006. Cardinal José Saraiva Martins beatified Nicoli in 2008 on behalf of the pontiff. Her feast is the date of her beatification, 3 February.

== Life ==
Giuseppina Nicoli was born in Pavia on 18 November 1863 as the fifth of ten children to Carlo Nicoli, a magistrate. Nicoli studied in Pavia and Voghera, where she achieved excellent results.

Nicoli became a member of the Vincentians at their San Salvario house in Turin on 24 September 1883. She was vested in the habit in late 1883 while in Paris. On 1 January 1885, her superiors dispatched her to the island of Sardinia where she served the poor and aided her order in a series of social initiatives targeted at the poor and orphaned. She dealt with the victims of a cholera outbreak in 1886. She made her simple vows on 24 December 1888. In June 1899, she became the director of the Sassari orphanage and there taught catechism to the poor and illiterate as well as to the daughters of rich families who had no religious instruction whatsoever. Nicoli encouraged Eucharistic Adoration and she supported the "Associazione dei Figli di Maria" while also serving as the director of the "Associazione delle Figlie di Maria". In 1893 she contracted tuberculosis that remained with her and corroded her health.

In 1910 her superior summoned her to Turin and - until August 1914 - served as the provincial administrator for the order there and was then sent back to Sardinia when her superiors noted her great contributions to the order's presence there. In Turin, she also served as the directress of the order's novitiate from 1912 until a mere nine months later. She also tended to wounded soldiers during World War I. Nicoli also worked alongside the "Monelli di Maria" and got the children that the movement aided to mass and also taught them how to read and write. It was while in Sassari that she became acquainted with Giovanni Battista Manzella.

Nicoli died of bronchial pneumonia at 9:00 am on 31 December 1924. Her relations wanted her to be interred next to her parents at Casatisma, but the people of Cagliari persuaded the relations to inter Nicoli's remains in the town. In October 1932, her remains were moved into a chapel at the Asilo della Marina in Cagliari.

== Beatification ==
The informative process for beatification commenced in 1930 and concluded its business in 1947, while two separate processes were held in other Italian cities - one in Sassari spanned from 1932 until 1947, while the other in Turin opened in 1934 and closed in 1947 at the same time as the other two processes. Theologians approved her writings to be orthodox on 12 January 1950. The formal introduction of the cause came under Pope Paul VI on 27 January 1966, and she was accorded the title of Servant of God as the first official stage in the process. The Congregation for the Causes of Saints validated these processes in Rome on 27 September 1985 and received the official Positio dossier from the postulation in 1998 for inspection.

Theologians approved the cause on 4 February 2005, as did the C.C.S. on 17 May 2005. On 28 April 2006, she was declared to be Venerable after Pope Benedict XVI confirmed that Nicoli had indeed lived a model life of heroic virtue.

The process for the investigation of the miracle needed for her to be beatified was held in Milan from 1934 until 1936 and was later validated on 28 September 1998, which allowed for a medical board to approve it on 30 June 2005 and theologians to follow suit on 13 June 2006. The C.C.S. also voted in favour of the miracle on 20 March 2007, which led to Benedict XVI approving it on 6 July 2007, thus confirming Nicoli would be beatified. Cardinal José Saraiva Martins presided over the beatification in Cagliari on the pope's behalf. There were 400 priests present in addition to sixteen Sardinian bishops and fourteen Italian mainland bishops. Cardinal Franc Rode was also present, as was Prince Emanuele Filiberto of Savoy, Prince of Venice.

The miracle in question involved the cure of Battista Colleoni of severe tuberculosis on 26 December 1933. The postulator for this cause is Shijo Kanjirathamkunnel.
