= Pauli Gerrei trilingual inscription =

Stele with Greek-Latin-Phoenician inscription

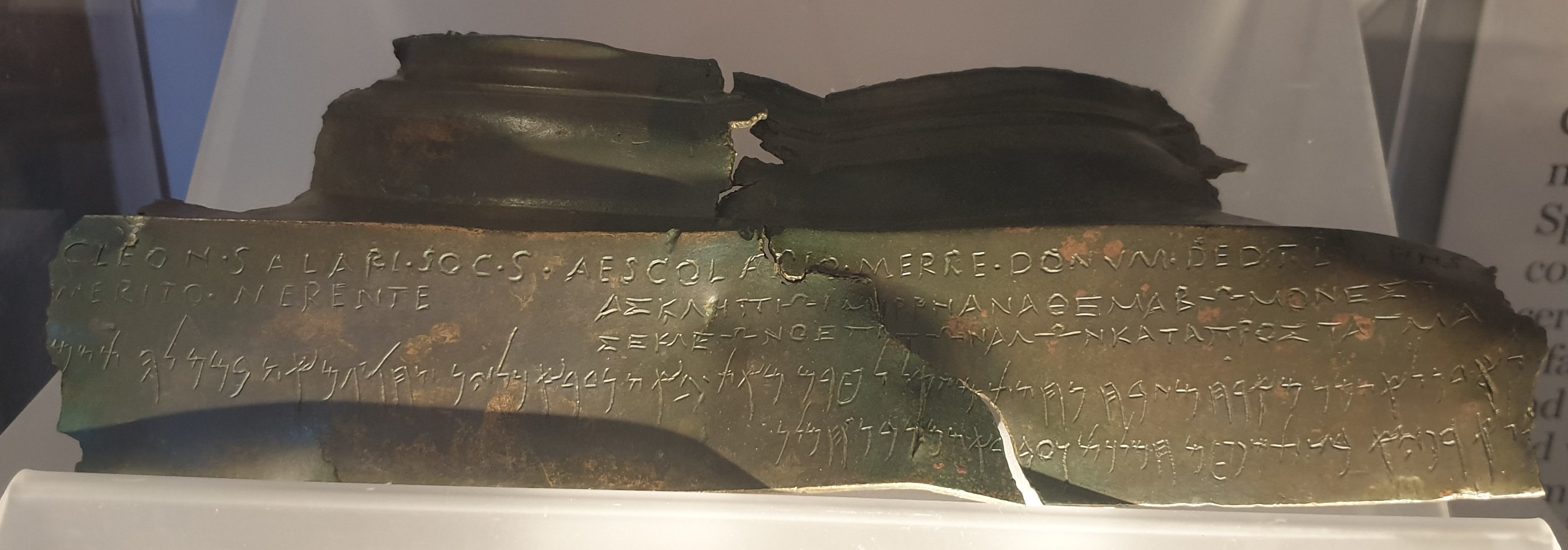
The Pauli Gerrei trilingual inscription

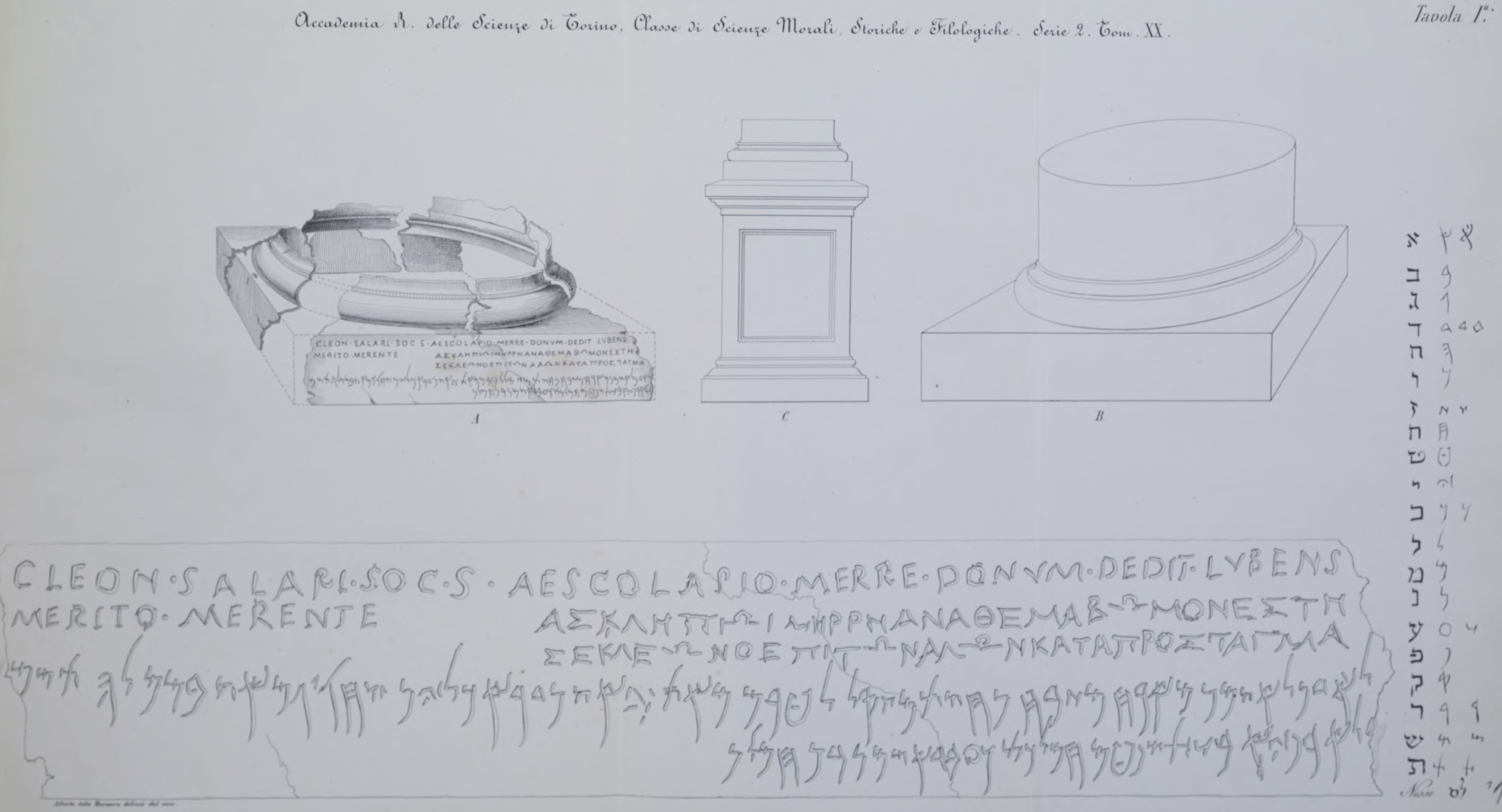
Giovanni Spano's 1862 publication of the inscription

The Pauli Gerrei trilingual inscription is a trilingual Greek-Latin-Phoenician inscription on the base of a bronze column found in San Nicolò Gerrei (known in Sardinian as Pauli Gerrei) in Sardinia in 1861. The stele was discovered by a notary named Michele Cappai, on the right side of the Strada statale 387 del Gerrei that descends towards Ballao.

Giovanni Spano, who originally published the inscription in 1862, later donated the inscription to the Museum of Turin. The inscription currently resides in the Turin Archaeology Museum. Turin had been the first capital of the unified Kingdom of Italy from 1861 to 1865 and Spano subsequently obtained the nomination as Senator of the Kingdom. On 10 October 2009 the then mayor of Pauli Gerrei, Silvestro Furcas requested that the inscription be returned to the town.

It is also known as KAI 66 and CIS I 143.

== Inscriptions ==
The inscriptions are a votive gift, a Phoenician votive inscription, to the Sardinian healing deity, equivalent to the Phoenician Eshmun and the Greco-Roman Asclepius in gratitude for a grace received.

The three texts do not correspond perfectly to each other. It is thought that the dedications were addressed to different social groups. The Latin text states that Cleon claims is a "slave (S.) of the contracting partners of the salt pans"; the fact that he does not indicate the name of his father and of the tribe he belongs to is an indication of his social status as a servant. The Punic text does not label Cleon as a slave but instead as an employee of the saltworks concession. The Greek inscription described Cleon's role as "superintendent of the salt pans".

- Latin: CLEON.SALARI.SOC.S.AESCOLAPIO.MERRE.DONVM.DEDIT.LUBENS.MERITO.MERENTE.
  - Translation: Cleon, a salari(ed) s(lave) of (the) comp(any), dedicated (this altar) as a gift to Asclepius-Merre, to whom thanks is deserving.
- Greek: ΑΣΚΛΗΠΙῼ ΜΗΡΡΗ ΑΝΑΘΕΜΑ ΒΩΜΟΝ ΕΣΤΗΣΕ ΚΛΕΩΝ Ο ΕΠΙ ΤΩΝ ΑΛΩΝ ΚΑΤΑ ΠΡΟΣΤΑΓΜΑ
  - Translation: For Asclepius-Merre this altar was erected, by salt-man Kleon, as (he was) commanded.
- Punic (transcribed): L’DN L’ŠMN M’RḤ M-ZBḤ NḤŠT MŠQL LṬRM M’T Y. ’Š NDR ’KLYN Š’SGM ’Š B MMLHT. ŠM[῾] [Q]L’ RPY’. BŠT ŠPṬM ḤMLKT W῾BD’ŠMN BN ḤMLN.
  - Translation: To Lord Eshmun-Merreḥ, a bronze altar with a weight of 100, which was dedicated by Kleon, (employee) of the agents who (work) in the saltworks: He heard his voice, He healed (him). In the year of the suffetes Himilco and 'Abd-Eshmun, son of Himilk.

== See also ==
- Quintus Markius trilingual inscription

== Bibliography ==
- Pietro Martini, Iscrizione trilingue in bronzo, Bullettino Archeologico Sardo 7 (1861), pp. 57–59;
- Spano, Giovanni (1862). Illustrazione di una base votiva in bronzo con iscrizione trilingue latina, greca e fenicia, trovata in Pauli Gerrei nell'isola di Sardegna ... Stamperia reale.
- Pietro Martini and Gaspare Gorresio, Sopra la base di bronzo con iscrizione trilingue, Bullettino Archeologico Sardo 8 (1862), pp. 24–29
- Spano, R. Accademia delle Scienze di Torino, Memorie, ser. II, (20) (1863), pp. 87–114;
- Spano, Bullettino Archeologico Sardo 9 (1863) pp. 89–95;
- Spano, Scoperte archeologiche fattesi nell’isola (estratti da Rivista Sarda) 1865, p. 20, 36;
- Fabrizio Pennacchietti, Un termine latino nell’iscrizione punica CIS n° 143? Una nuova congettura in: Beccari & Marello, La parola al testo, 2001, pp. 302–315
- Ritschl, F., & Gildemeister, J. (1865). Dreisprachige Inschrift von Sardinien. Rheinisches Museum Für Philologie, 20, 1-14
- Levy, Moritz Abraham, m Ueber eine lateinisch-griechisch-phönizische Inschrift aus Sardinien, Zeitschrift der Deutschen Morgenländischen Gesellschaft : ZDMG / Deutsche Morgenländische Gesellschaft
- Moriggi, M. (2011). PHOENICIAN AND PUNIC INSCRIPTIONS IN THE MUSEO DI ANTICHITÀ DI TORINO (TURIN, ITALY), Egitto E Vicino Oriente, 34, 81-94
- Amadasi Guzzo, Maria Giulia (1990). Iscrizioni fenicie e puniche in Italia (PDF). Libreria dello Stato, Istituto poligrafico e Zecca dello Stato. ISBN 978-88-240-0109-0.
- Plurilinguismo e motivazioni identitarie nel Mediterraneo del II/I sec. a.C. Il caso della trilingue di Pauli Gerrei, in [Incontri linguistici : 41, 2018][Pisa : Fabrizio Serra, 2018.] - Permalink: http://digital.casalini.it/10.19272/201800801005 - Permalink: http://digital.casalini.it/4460957
