= Quintus Marcius trilingual inscription =

Ancient inscription of the Punic era

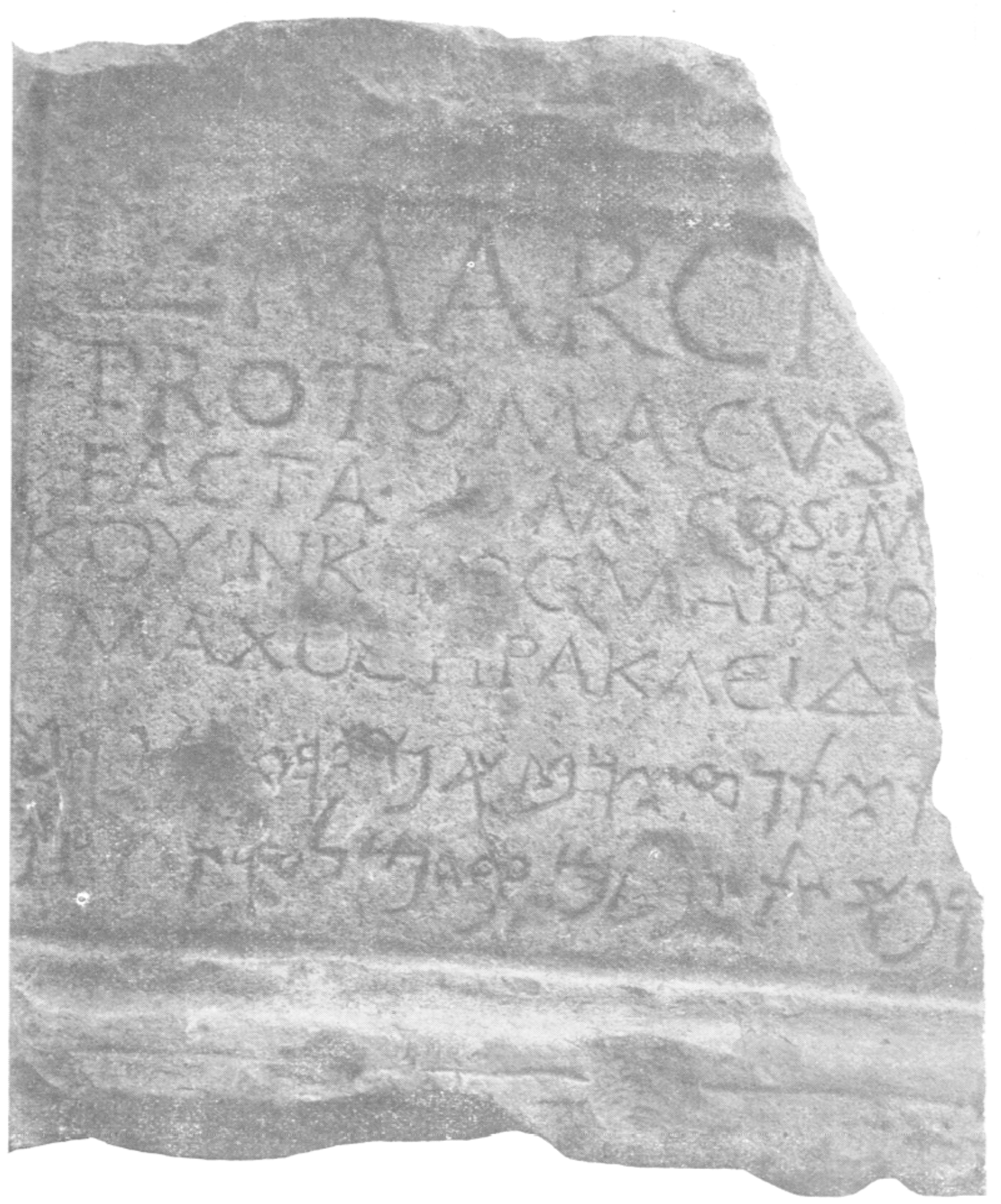
The Quintus Marcius trilingual inscription as published in 1899

The Quintus Marcius trilingual inscription is a Latin-Greek-Punic trilingual inscription on stone, found in 1899 in Henchir-Alouin, near Uthina, in the outskirts of Tunis, Tunisia. The Phoenician script is dated between the fall of Carthage in 146 BC and the beginning of the Christian era.

The inscription is engraved on a stone object, decorated at the top and the bottom with molding, perhaps a lintel or, more probably, an altar.

The Latin inscription has been published as CIL VIII, 24030 CIL and the Punic inscription as RES 79.

The object is currently in the Louvre (ID AO 3240).

== Inscription ==
The inscription reads:

(line 1 - Latin)	Q. MARCI[us...]	Quintus Marci[us...]	Quintus Marci[us...]
(line 2 - Latin)	PROTOMACVS [medicus...]	Protomacus [medicus...]	Protomacus [the physician...]
(line 3 - Latin)	FACTA. L(?). M. COS. M[...]	facta L... M... Cos... M... [...]	made ... [...]
(line 4 - Greek)	ΚΟΥΙΝΚΤΟΣΜΑΡΚΙΟ[ς πρωτο]	Kouinktos Markio[s Prōto-...]	Kouinktos Markio[s Proto-]
(line 5 - Greek)	ΜΑΧΟΣΗΡΑΚΛΕΙΔΟ[υ ἰατρός...]	-machos Herakleido[u iatros...]	-machos Heracleide[s the physician...]
(line 6 - Punic)	[המזבח? ז]𐤕?𐤉𐤕𐤍𐤒𐤉𐤍𐤈𐤀𐤌𐤏𐤓𐤒𐤉𐤐𐤓𐤈	[hmzbḥ? z]t ytn qynṭʾ mʿrqy prṭ-	[This altar] gave Quintus Marcius Proto-]
(line 7 - Punic)	[מקא ה]𐤓𐤐𐤀𐤔𐤕𐤔𐤐𐤈𐤌𐤏𐤁𐤃𐤌𐤋𐤒𐤓𐤕𐤅𐤀𐤃𐤍𐤁<על>	[mqʾ h]rpʾ št špṭm ʿbdmlqrt wʾdnb<ʿl>	[-makus the] physician (in the) year of the Suffets Abdmelqart and Adonba<al>.

The length of the gap in first Latin line points to the inclusion of the donor's filiation. The third line presents a difficulty: the abbreviations ("L(?). M. COS. M[...]") may mention a date, but cannot be interpreted as the names of the Suffets Abdmelqart and Adonbaal; perhaps it refers to duumviri of a neighboring colony.

The Greek inscription presents the name of the dedicator, following a genitive. Both this and the Latin have restored with the word for "physician," based on the Punic: "ἰατρός" and "medicus". The name Ἡρακλείδης corresponds to the Phoenician Abdmelqart. This fact makes a restoration like "ἄρχοντος" - which will make the Greek and Punic parts parallel - possible, although it doesn't explain the presence of only one Suffet, and hence it is simpler to see Herakleides as the father, following the traditional Greek structure of such inscriptions.

The beginning of the first line of the Punic inscription is reconstructed with uncertainty; Zayin and Taw in this version of the Punic/Neo-Punic script are similar, therefore the logical reconstructions are "[hmzbḥ z]t" ("th[is (female) altar") and "[hmzbḥ ʾ]z" ("th[is (male) altar"). The last two letters of the second line, which end the name Adonbaal, seem to be missing.

== Dating ==
The lack of h in the Latin transcription of the name Protomacus help determine the date of the inscription: aspirations began to be noted in Latin around the time of Julius Caesar and Cicero, so although the transition was gradual, it is plausible to date the inscription to the middle of the first century BC. The Phoenician script is between the Punic and the Neo-Punic phases, between the fall of Carthage and the beginning of the Christian era. The Punic transcription of the foreign names does not preserve the suffix s (Quintus was pronounced "Quinte", and Marcius "Marqi"); the Latin K and Greek Κ are rendered by Punic Qoph, and the Latin T and Greek Τ are rendered by Punic Teth.

Bilingual and even trilingual inscriptions for doctors are not a rarity in Africa and elsewhere in the ancient world.

== See also ==
- Pauli Gerrei trilingual inscription
