= Monumental Cemetery of Bonaria =

Cemetery in Cagliari, Italy

Coordinates: 39.210833°N 9.124722°E

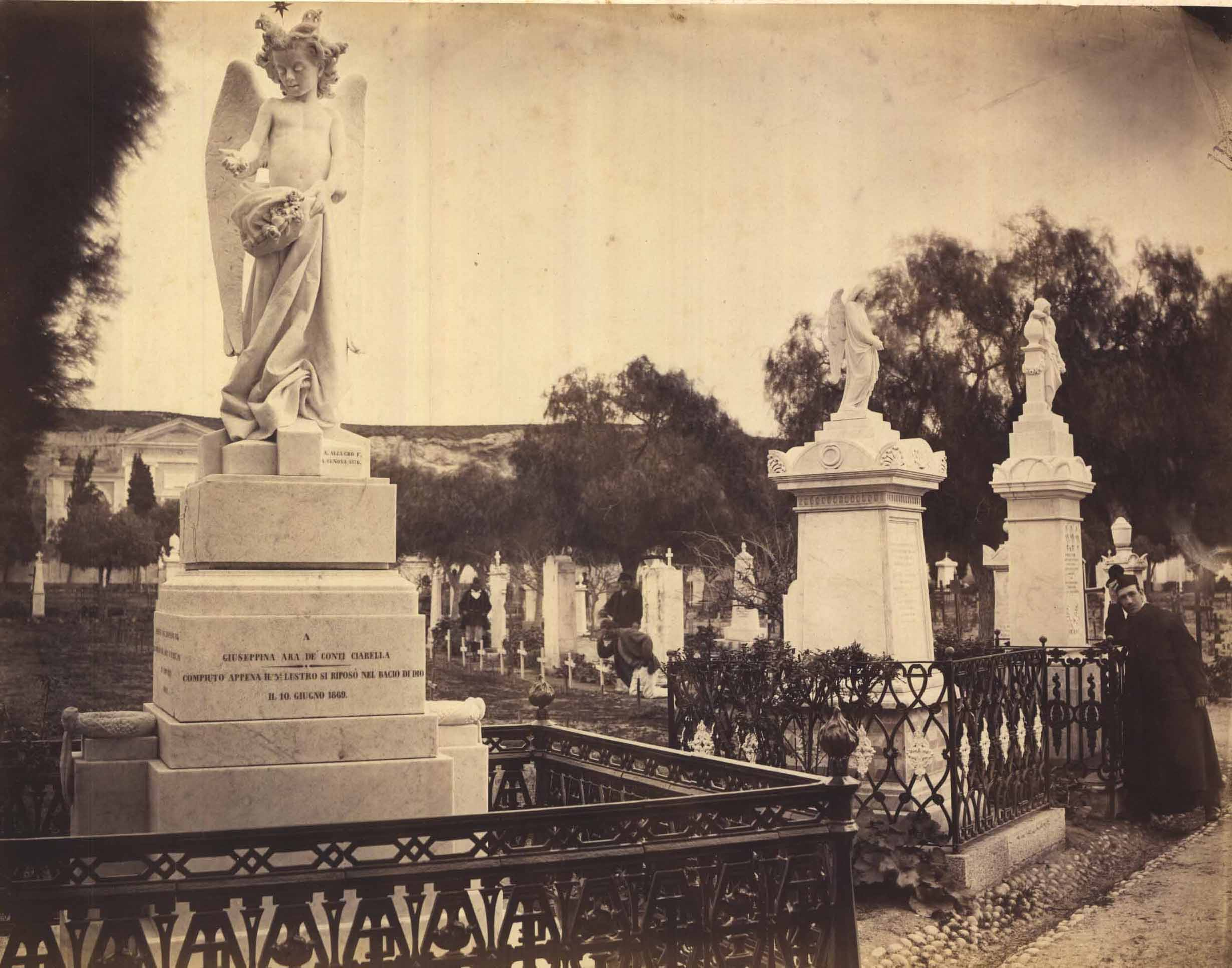
The Cemetery of Bonaria in 1870, with the memorial to Giuseppina Ara dei conti Ciarella in the foreground

The Monumental Cemetery of Bonaria is located in Cagliari, Sardinia, Italy. In use between 1829 and 1968, this monumental cemetery originally occupied an area at the base of the hill of Bonaria, and over time expanded upwards. The main entrance is located in Piazza Cimitero, with a second entrance in Ravenna, at the Basilica of Bonaria. Several famous people were buried in Bonaria, including the canonical archaeologist Giovanni Spano, the tenor Piero Schiavazzi and General Carlo Sanna.

== History ==
The cemetery is sited on a necropolis that had been used by Punic, Roman and early Christian communities of Cagliari; several ancient caves were carved into the limestone of the hill, formerly used as tombs. Archaeological finds removed from the caves are nowadays in the museum of Bonaria.

The modern Bonaria cemetery was built in 1828 by Luigi Damiano, Captain of Engineers, and opened on 1 January 1829. Thirty years later an extension was designed by Gaetano Cima. In use between 1829 and 1968, the cemetery, which originally occupied an area at the base of the hill of Bonaria, extended in subsequent extensions to the top. Until 1929 the church of Santa Maria de Portu Gruttis, also known as San Bardilio, stood by the entrance, dating back to the 12th century. The French traveller Vuiller Gaston described Cagliari in 1890 in his book Les îles oubliées: les Baleares, la Corse et la Sardaigne, impressions de voyage (published in 1893). He wrote: "The tombs here are of exceptional richness. White statue symbolicly peer through the cypresses and huge bouquets of flowers, wreaths, left at recent funerals, have preserved some of their freshness."

Since its closure in 1968, burials are only permitted in private chapels or burial vaults purchased before 1968. New burials now occur in San Michele Cemetery, opened in 1940. Bonaria, with its rich historical and artistic heritage, is currently experiencing decay.

== Description ==
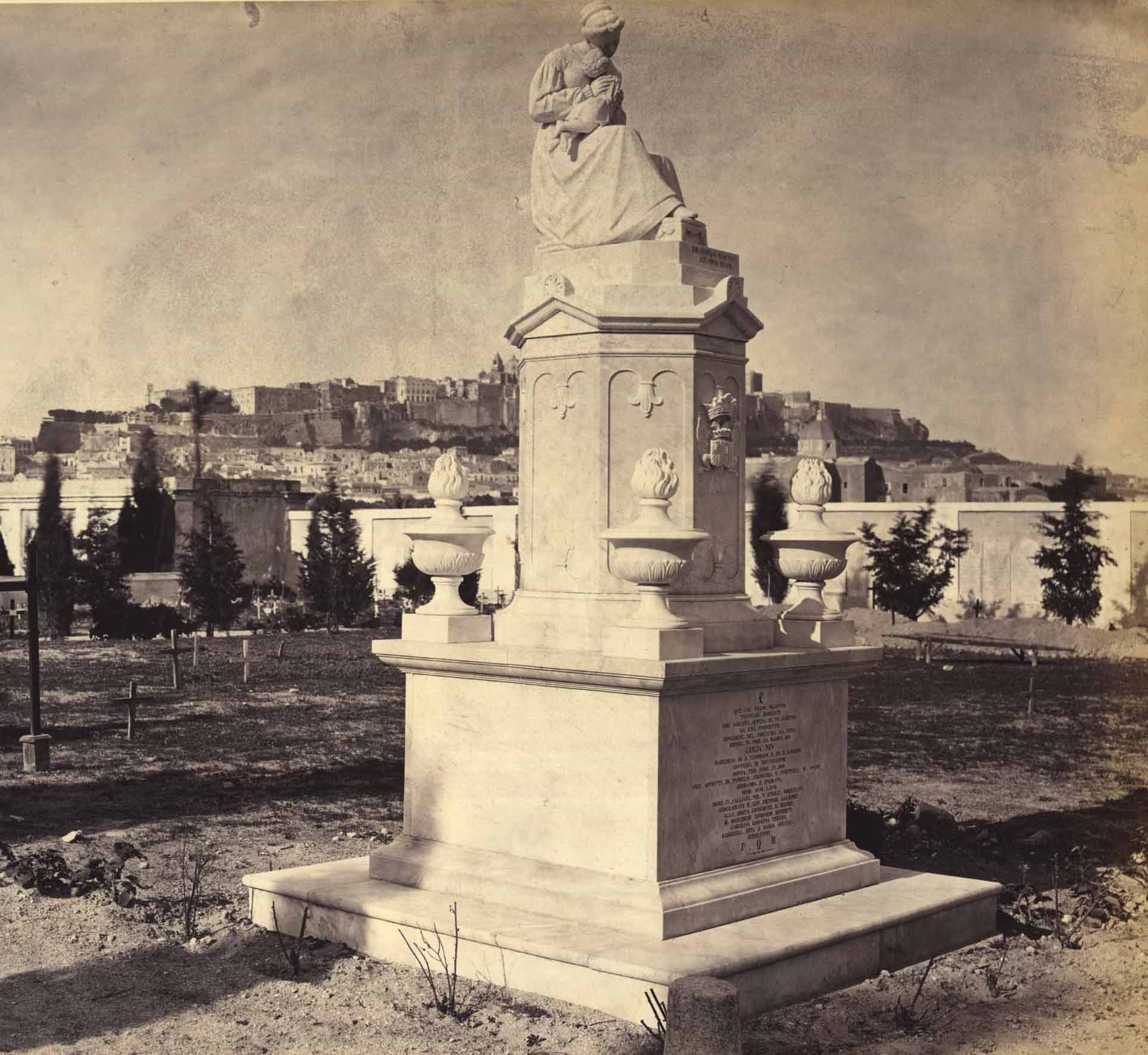
Monument to the Marquis Luigi Nin, with the hill of Castello in the background

The oldest part of the cemetery is the flat area at the base of the hill, alongside the boundary wall. This area is divided into rectangular areas, with a neoclassical Chapel at its centre, around which are burials of children. Subsequent extensions expanded th grounds to the top of the hill.

The cemetery contains many artistic memorials and burials of notable people, including the mayor of Cagliari Ottone Baccaredda, the historian Pietro Martini, the canon and archaeologist Giovanni Spano (buried in a tomb he himself designed and built, reusing archaeological remains). Other interesting tombs and chapels were built between the end of the 19th and early 20th centuries by artists such as Giuseppe Sartorio, Tito Sarrocchi, Cosimo Fadda, Andrea Ugolini, Emanuele Giacobbe, Giovanni Pandiani and others, providing a wide variety of tastes and styles, from neoclassical through Realism and Symbolism to Art Nouveau.

=== Entrance and square of San Bardilio ===
The current main entrance, with adjoining caretaker's accommodation, was built in 1985. Its heavy cubic structure in concrete was the cause of some controversy. To the left of the entrance are the memorials of many young soldiers who fell in the First World War. Opposite is the Chapelle family mausoleum (1910) containing a massive marble statue of the Prophet Ezekiel, by Giuseppe Sartorio.

To the right of the entrance is an area of chapels and monuments surrounded by vegetation. This area is bounded on the left side by the avenue General Sanna, so called because it leads to the tomb of General Carlo Sanna, who commanded the Sassari Brigade during the First World War. The general, who died in 1928, rests with his wife in a simple tomb in pink granite, by Filippo Figari. Nearby is the monument to Warzée Frances, wife of a Belgian entrepreneur, comprising a group of sculptures executed by Sartorio in 1894, which includes an effigy of the son of the deceased, raising a blanket covering his mother, lying on a bed and bent as if to kiss her face.

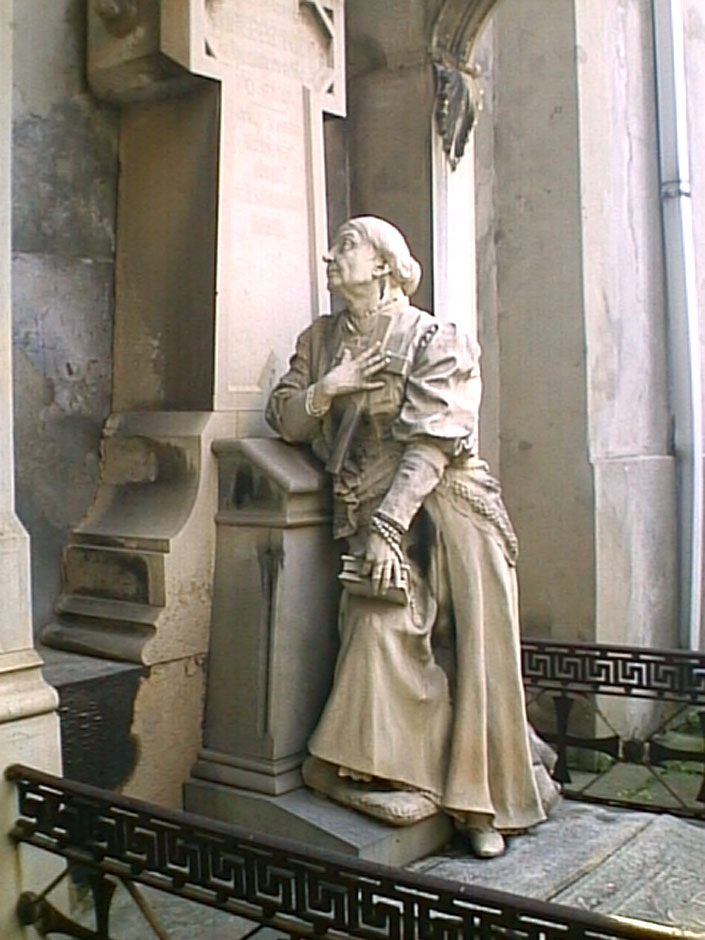
The monument to lawyer Giuseppe Todde

Behind the graves of the war dead is the so-called "square of San Bardilio", named after the ancient church that stood in this area until 1929. The walls that surround the square are home to, among others, the tomb of Ottone Baccaredda (1849–1921), a famous mayor of Cagliari, who promoted the construction of the Palazzo Civico (Town Hall) and the Bastion of Saint Remy.

Nearby is the tomb of the historian Pietro Martini (1800–1866). On the rear wall are eight round arches used for family tombs, some of them crumbling. The Birocchi-Berol mausoleum, the ceiling decorated with clouds and angels in plaster and walls in marble, are fronted by an angel who holds a finger of his right hand to his mouth, indicating silence (sculpture by Giuseppe Sartorio). The Calvi memorial nearby has sculptures by Sartorio and paintings by the artist Guglielmo Bilancioni of Rimini. Opposite the Calvi monument is the memorial to lawyer Giuseppe Todde, a statue of a woman praying at the base of a pillar surmounted by a cross-shaped bust depicting the deceased, executed by Sartorio in 1897.

=== Campo santo vecchio and the 1835 and 1858 extensions ===
Past San Bardilio are four squares that formed the core of the original graveyard. These squarescontained some dilapidated monuments, including the grave of Giovanni Marghinotti (1798–1865). A winged Genius marks the grave of Giuseppina Ara dei conti Ciarella, sculpted by Agostino Allegri (1870). The monument to the Parisian banker Victor Camille Fevrier, is a marble bust of the deceased, draped by an angel, by Giuseppe Sartorio (1898).

The walls that surround the area of the old graveyard hold fifty vaults, including some belonging to societies of Saint George and Catherine of Genoa (bearing the emblem of Genoa) outside. Among the family vaults, the Barrago vault holds the monument to Maria Anna Barrago dei conti Ciarella, sculpted in 1880 by Giovanni Battista Villa, a marble statue of the woman who died aged 35.

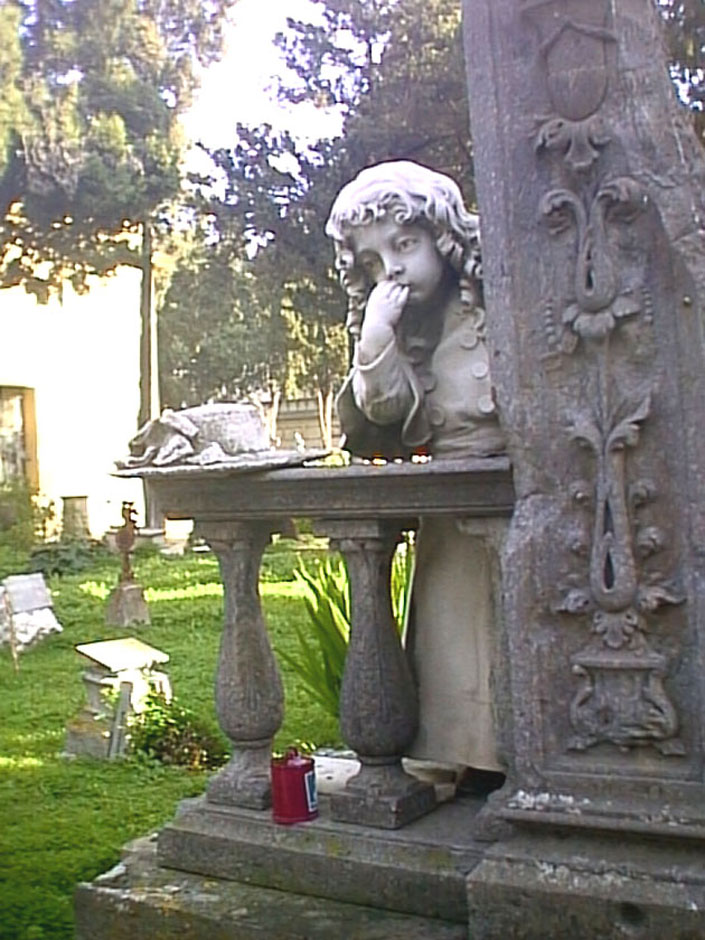
Memorial to Maria Ugo Ortu

The Nurchis vault opposite commemorates Jenny Nurchis, with a realistically detailed marble statue by Sartorio (1884) of the woman dressed in the fashion of the time. Also of interest is the Cugia vault, holding sculptures such as a bust of Colonel Francesco Cugia, by Tito Sarrocchi, the monument to General Efisio Cugia and the sculptural group representing Caterina and Speranza Cugia, by Giovanni Pandiani.

A small complex at the centre is flanked by two rooms that were formerly used as a burial chapel for archbishops Cagliari and as morgue, respectively. The neoclassical chapel's façade is made up of a tympanum supported by two pairs of pilasters on the sides. At the rear of the chapel is the tomb of the archaeologist Giovanni Spano, who composed the Latin inscription when he was still alive. The tomb is Roman-style coffin of the type discovered by Spano in Bonaria. The sarcophagus, supported by four columns, is topped by a marble bust depicting the Spano, by Sartorio.

Beside and behind the chapel are nine squares which were set out in 1835 and 1858. Infants and children were buried closest to the chapel and hold emotional monuments, such as the sculpture for Maria Ugo Ortu (died aged two) comprising the child resting by a broken column behind a short balustrade in trachyte stone from Serrenti, symbolizing the boundary between life and death. The work was executed in 1891 by Sartorio.

=== Campo Palme ===
The Campo Palme (named after the Palm trees there) are divided into rectangles, the result of two additions made in 1858 and 1906. This area is one of the least well-kept parts of the cemetery, which has resulted in several corpses being transferred to the cemetery of San Michele.

To the east, towards the top of the cemetery, is the old section, divided into six squares, lined by vaults. One square was allocated to non-Catholic burials and many of the graves were moved here that occupy the former non-Catholic cemetery of Bonaria, known as the "Cimitero degli Inglesi" (English Cemetery) which, until 1895, was located in Via XX Settembre. Inside the chapel is a plaque that indicates the tomb of Tarquino Sini, who died at Cagliari in 1943.

=== Upper Zone ===
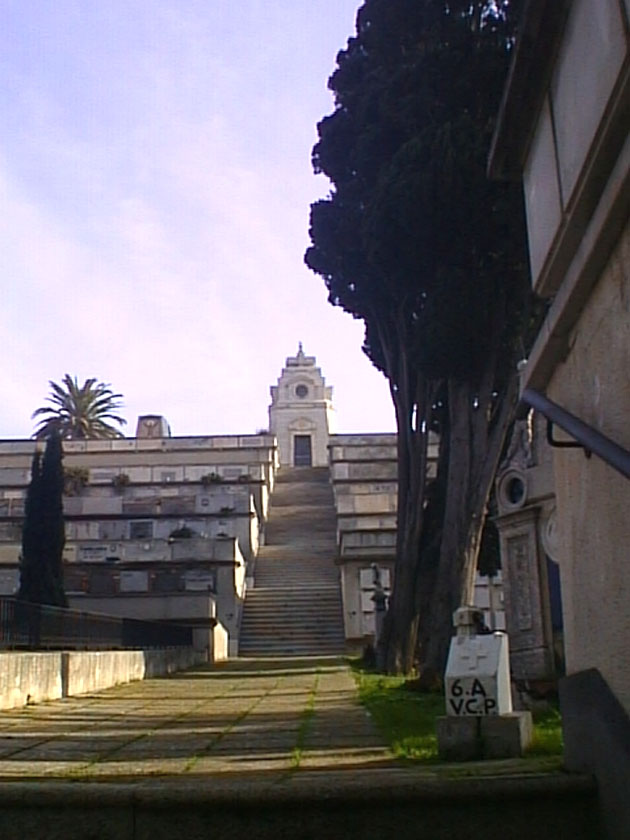
Faggioli memorial in the Upper zone of the cemetery

The upper part of the cemetery on the hill of Bonaria houses several rows of vaults and charnel houses, located along the east wall and walls arranged parallel to it.

In this area holds the Blessed Nicola da Gesturi, of the Capuchins. There is also the tomb of the tenor Piero Schiavazzi.

In the upper part of the cemetery are also some mausolea. The first, dating from 1898, was that of the family Onnis Devoto, by Sartorio. That of Faggioli contains three important paintings by Filippo Figari (1921). Also by Figari, the Larco monument, (1922) includes a painting by Figari, representing the Entombment of Christ. The painting caused controversy with Joseph of Arimathea pictured as a gravedigger, Mary Magdalene appearing dishevelled, and Christ's body stiff and rigid.
