= Bonaria Manca =

Italian painter (1925–2020)

- Born: 10 July 1925; Orune, Sardinia, Kingdom of Italy
- Died: 17 October 2020 (aged 95); Tuscania, Lazio, Italy
- Occupation: Painter
- Style: Naïve

Bonaria Manca (10 July 1925 – 17 October 2020) was an Italian painter of the naïve style.

== Biography ==
Manca was born in Orune, in Sardinia, in 1925. She arrived in Tuscania, in Lazio, in 1950 with her family. The twelfth of thirteen children in a family of shepherds, she was set to follow in her family's footsteps. The treatment of wool and fabric in water would come into representation in her later works. She has been exhibited in Rome, Turin, Paris, Lyon, Geneva, Thessaloniki, Marseille, and the Netherlands. In 2000, she transformed her house in Tuscania into a small museum called La Casa dei Simboli ('The House of Symbols'). She died in Tuscania on 17 October 2020, at the age of 95.

== Art ==
Bonaria Manca painted scenes of rural life, women washing clothing in rivers, and surrealist figures. Writer and filmmaker Jean-Marie Drot said of her work: "What I like about Bonaria's work is that almost nothing comes from the head, but everything comes from the heart. For me, it's a cosmic painting. [...] The house of Bonaria, in a way, is perhaps unique in all of Italy. Having a Bonaria painting is like having a talisman, a lucky charm in a world of loneliness, like opening a window to the next day, a future full of light."
