= Giovanni Spano =

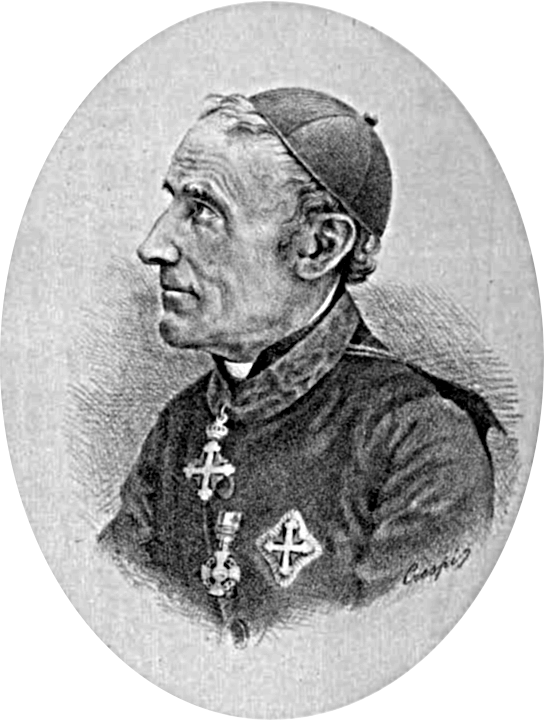
- Portrait of Giovanni Spano in 1872
- Born: 3 March 1803; Ploaghe, Sardinia
- Died: 3 April 1878 (aged 75); Cagliari, Sardinia
- Church: Catholic
- Ordained: 1830

Giovanni Spano (born Ploaghe, Sardinia, 3 March 1803; died Cagliari, Sardinia, 3 April 1878), also a priest and a linguist, is considered one of the first archaeologists to study the Mediterranean island of Sardinia.

After elementary school in which he learnt Arabic, Greek, Hebrew, Italian, Latin and Sardinian, he progressed to a Sassari seminary and in 1825 earned a degree in theology. He was ordained in 1830 and in 1854 became director of the Cagliari Athenaeum. In 1871 he was named senator of the Kingdom of Italy and professor in Turin.

He wrote the Ortografia sarda nazionale, ossia grammatica della lingua loguderese paragonata all'italiana (1840), in an attempt to find a single and unified orthography for the Sardinian language: the book, following the classification of the Italian Francesco Cetti, proposed the division of Sardinian into four dialects and a unified writing form based on Logudorese, an umbrella for a group of dialects spoken in villages (biddas) like Bono, Bonorva, Bosa, Ghilarza, Macomer, Ozieri, Ploaghe and Sennori.

He also wrote a Sardinian-Italian/Italian-Sardinian Dictionary (1851–1852), the four-volume Sardinian Archaeological Bulletin (1855–1861), the 'Guida della città e dintorni di Cagliari (1856), the Guida del Duomo di Cagliari (1856), and the Storia e descrizione dell'Anfiteatro Romano di Cagliari (1868).

When he died in 1878, the words "Patriam dilexit, laboravit" were inscribed on his tomb at Bonaria. A scientific college in Sassari is now named after him.
