= Shrine of Our Lady of Bonaria =

Coordinates: 39.2085°N 9.1257°E

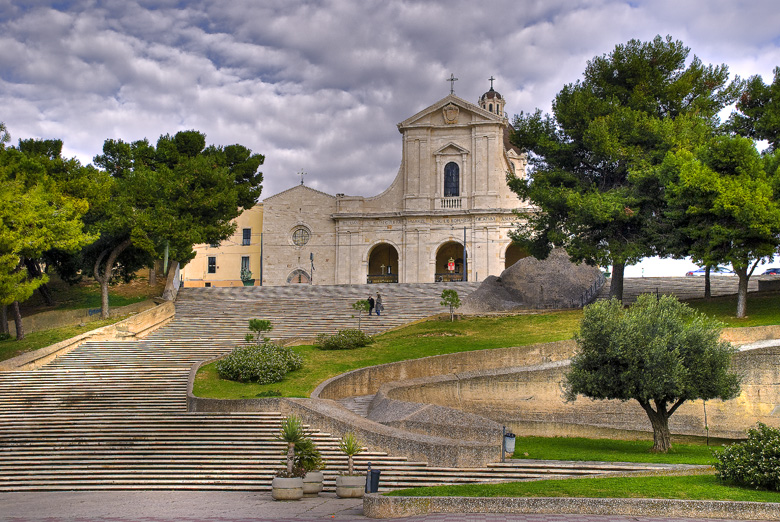
Sanctuary of Our Lady of Bonaria, in Cagliari, Sardinia

The Shrine of Our Lady of Bonaria (Italian: Santuario di Nostra Signora di Bonaria), also known as Our Lady of Fair Winds, is a Marian title associated with the Blessed Virgin Mary as Star of the Sea and patron of sailboats. In addition, it is first associated with a Roman Catholic shrine to the Blessed Virgin Mary located in Cagliari, Sardinia, Italy.

The Shrine is part of a complex of buildings, which include the Basilica of Our Lady of Bonaria, the Sanctuary of Our Lady of Bonaria, and the monastery which houses the friars of the Order of the Blessed Virgin Mary of Mercy. The Basilica and the other structures are under the administration of the Mercedarians, a religious order which has overseen the care of the shrine continuously since October 17, 1335.

Mary, under this Marian title, is often portrayed carrying the Child Jesus, along with a golden sailboat and a candle in her right arm. She is invoked as the Patroness of Sardinia, as well as Buenos Aires, Argentina, to which Pope Francis was also a known devotee.

== Traditional account of statue's history ==
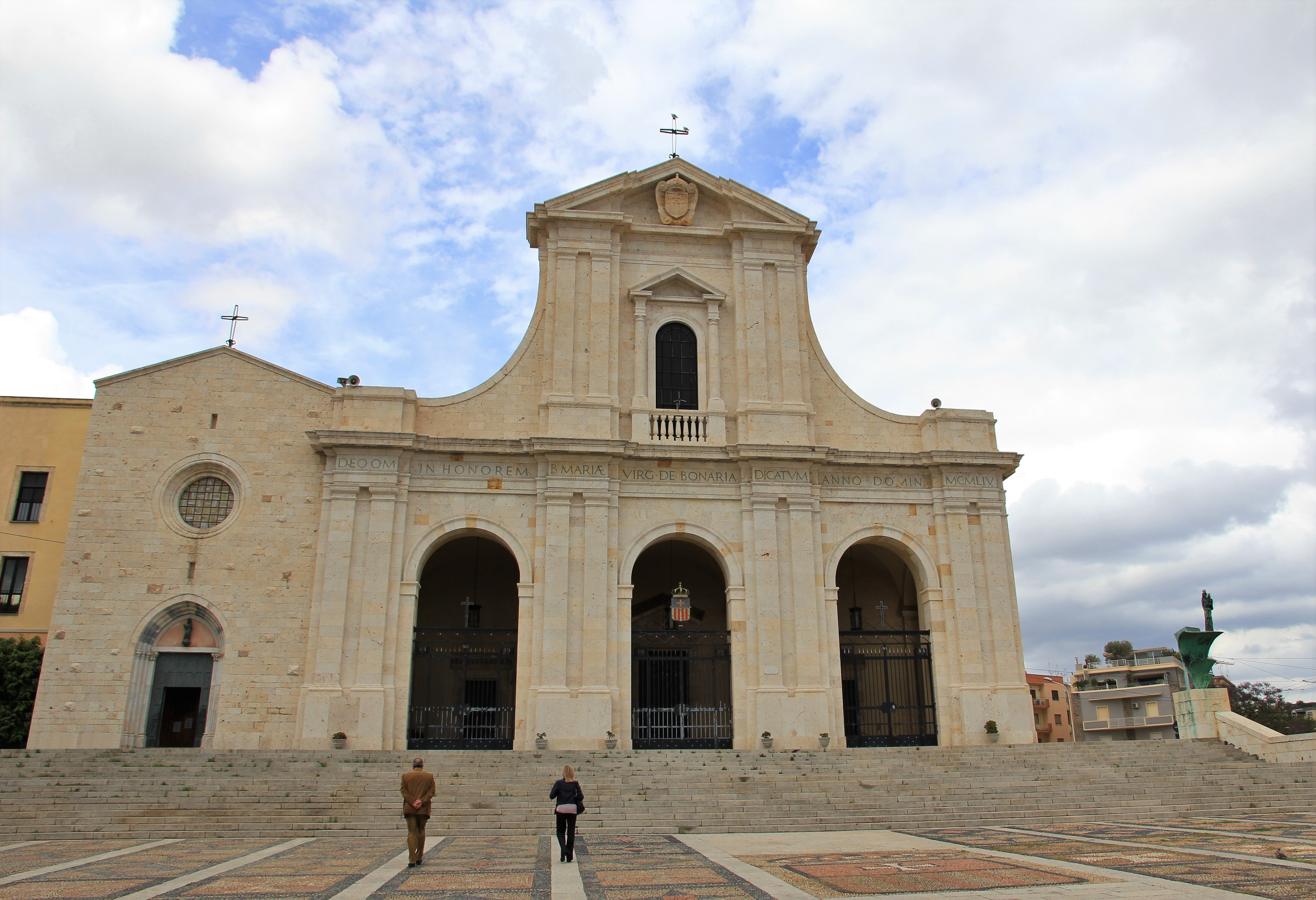
The Sanctuary on the left and the Basilica on the right

On March 25, 1370, a ship coming from Spain was traveling towards Italy when it was seized by a terrible storm that put the lives of the crew and passengers at risk. The captain, in a last attempt to save the crew of the ship, ordered the sailors to cast the ship's cargo into the sea. This was done but without any aid to the sailors.

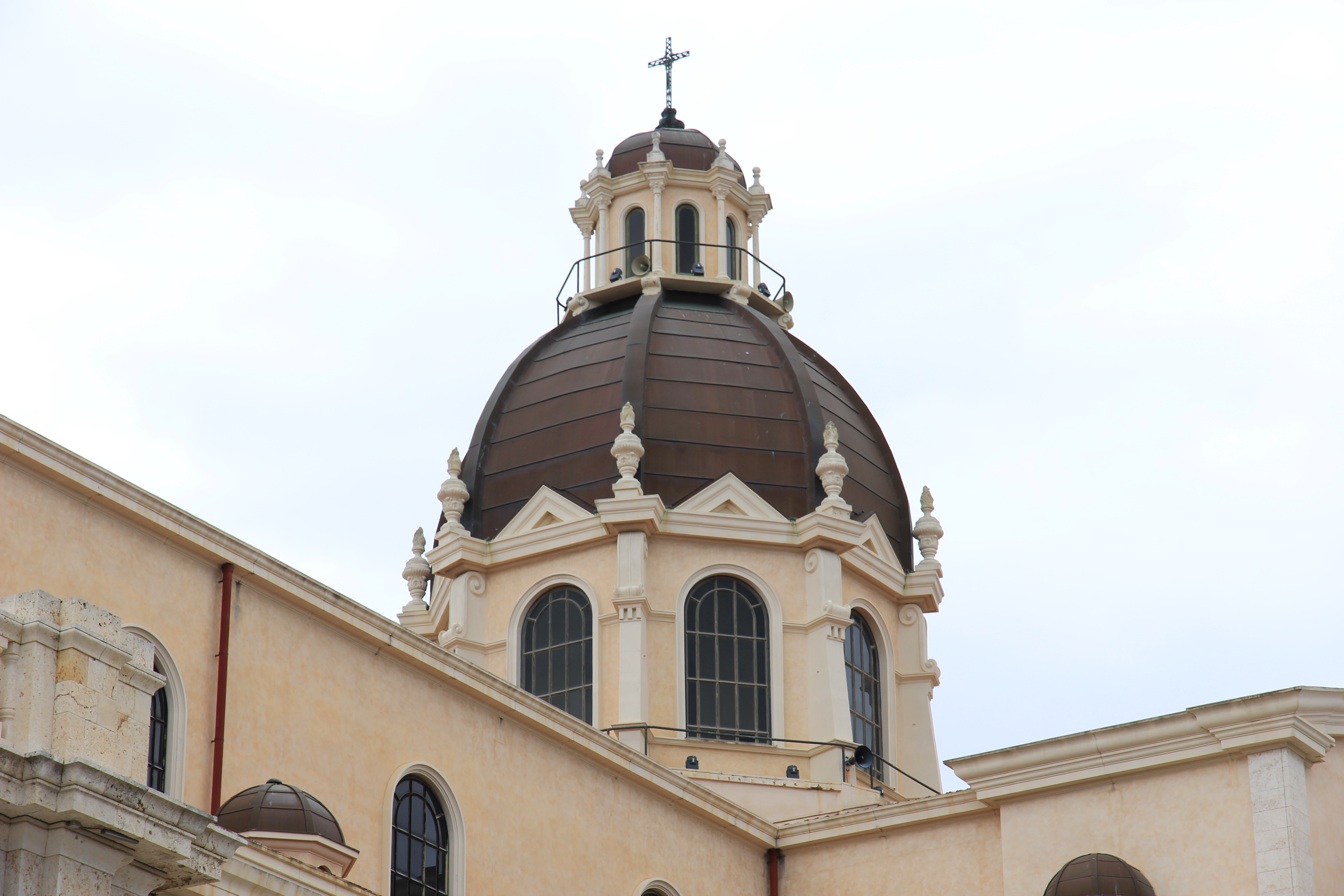
The cupola of the building

There was a large crate within the ship's cargo that was cast into the sea last. Suddenly, upon the crate entering the water, the storm ceased. The ship, attempting to regain the cargo, followed the crate for some time. Unable to retrieve it, the ship returned to its original route. The crate, however, ran aground on the beach at the foot of the hill of Bonaria (Sardinia).

Many people were on the beach when the crate arrived and rushed to see what it was. They tried to open it, but no one succeeded. They tried to lift it, but every attempt was in vain - the box was too heavy. Suddenly a child cried out: "Call for one of the Mercedarian Friars!" The friars came in haste, and without any difficulty, raised the heavy crate and carried it into their church.

In silence and piety, the friars opened the crate, and along with everyone there, saw the contents. In that crate was a marvelous statue of the Blessed Virgin Mary and Child in her arms and, in her right hand, a lighted candle.

== Etymology ==
When the Catalans, led by the King of Aragon and Count of Barcelona, conquered Cagliari, Sardinia from the Pisans in 1324, they established their headquarters on top of a hill that overlooked the city. The hill was known to them as Bon Ayre (or "Bonaria" in Sardinian language), as it was free of the foul smell prevalent in the old city (the Castle area), which is adjacent to swampland. During the siege of Cagliari, the Catalans built a sanctuary to the Virgin Mary on top of the hill. In 1335, King Alfonso the Gentle donated the church to the Mercedarians, who built an abbey that stands to this day. In the years after, a story circulated, claiming that a statue of the Virgin Mary was retrieved after it miraculously calmed a storm in the Mediterranean Sea. The statue was placed in the abbey.

Two centuries later, Spanish sailors, especially Andalusians, venerated this image and frequently invoked the "Fair Winds" to aid them in their navigation and prevent shipwrecks. A sanctuary to the Virgin of Buen Aire would be later erected in Seville.

The capital of Argentina, Buenos Aires, was named by its founders the captain Pedro de Mendoza: Santa María del Buen Aire ("Holy Mary of the Fair Winds"), a name chosen by the chaplain of Mendoza's expedition, a devotee of the Virgin of Buen Aire. Mendoza's settlement soon came under attack by indigenous peoples, and was abandoned in 1541.

== Patroness ==
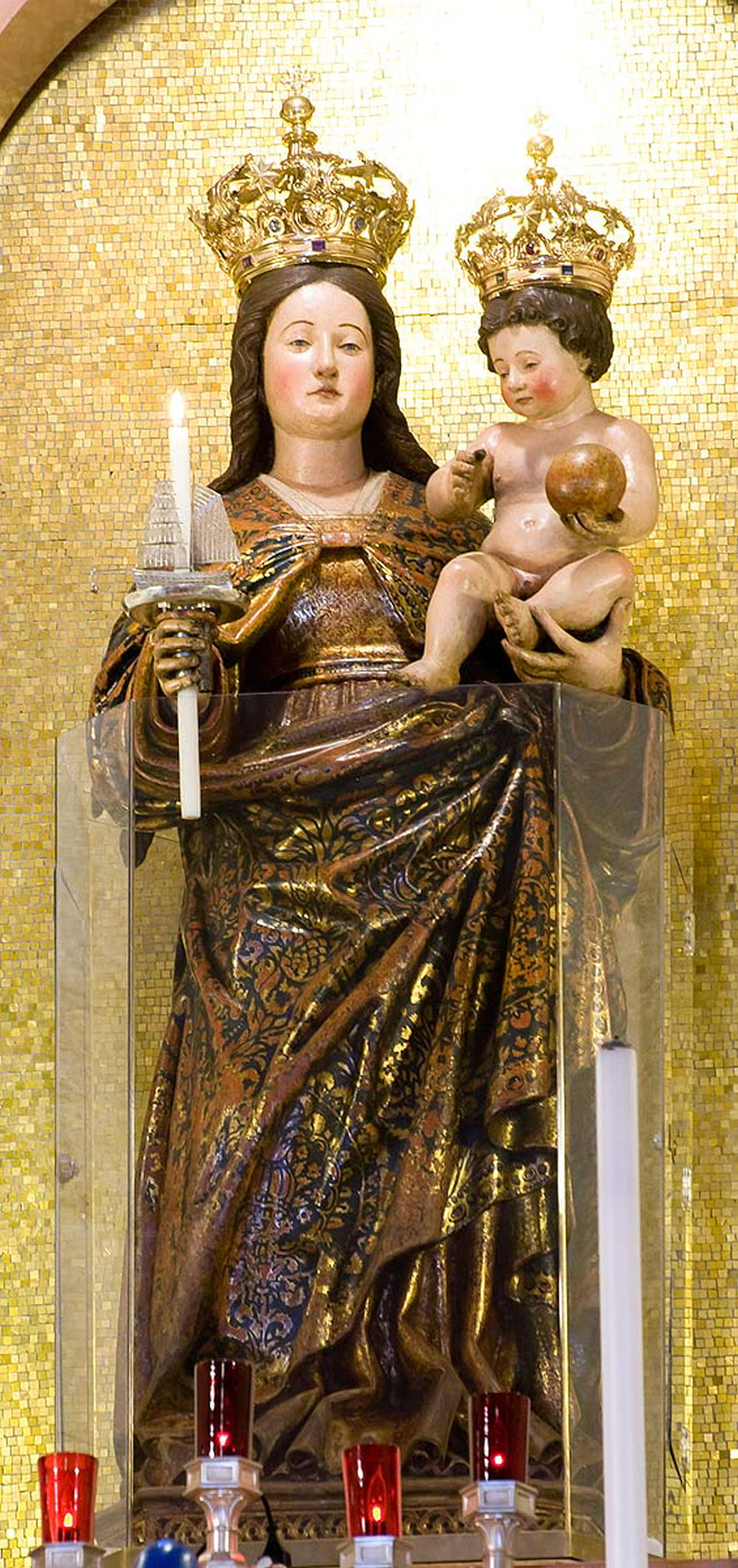
Our Lady of Bonaria statue

The devotion to Our Lady of Bonaria spread quickly over the island, and the Blessed Virgin Mary, under this title, has been named the patroness of Sardinia, then later became a patroness for Buenos Aires, Argentina, along with the Holy Trinity.

== Canonical coronation and honours ==
The Basilica of Our Lady of Bonaria was visited by Pope Benedict XVI on Feast of the Nativity of Mary in 2008. On that solemn occasion, the Pontiff granted a canonical coronation to the famed image, and bestowed the honor of a Golden Rose on the shrine.

Pope Francis made a repeated Apostolic visit to Sardinia in September 2013.
