= Basilica of Our Lady of Bonaria =

Catholic Marian basilica in Italy

Coordinates: 39°12′30.1″N 9°07′31.0″E

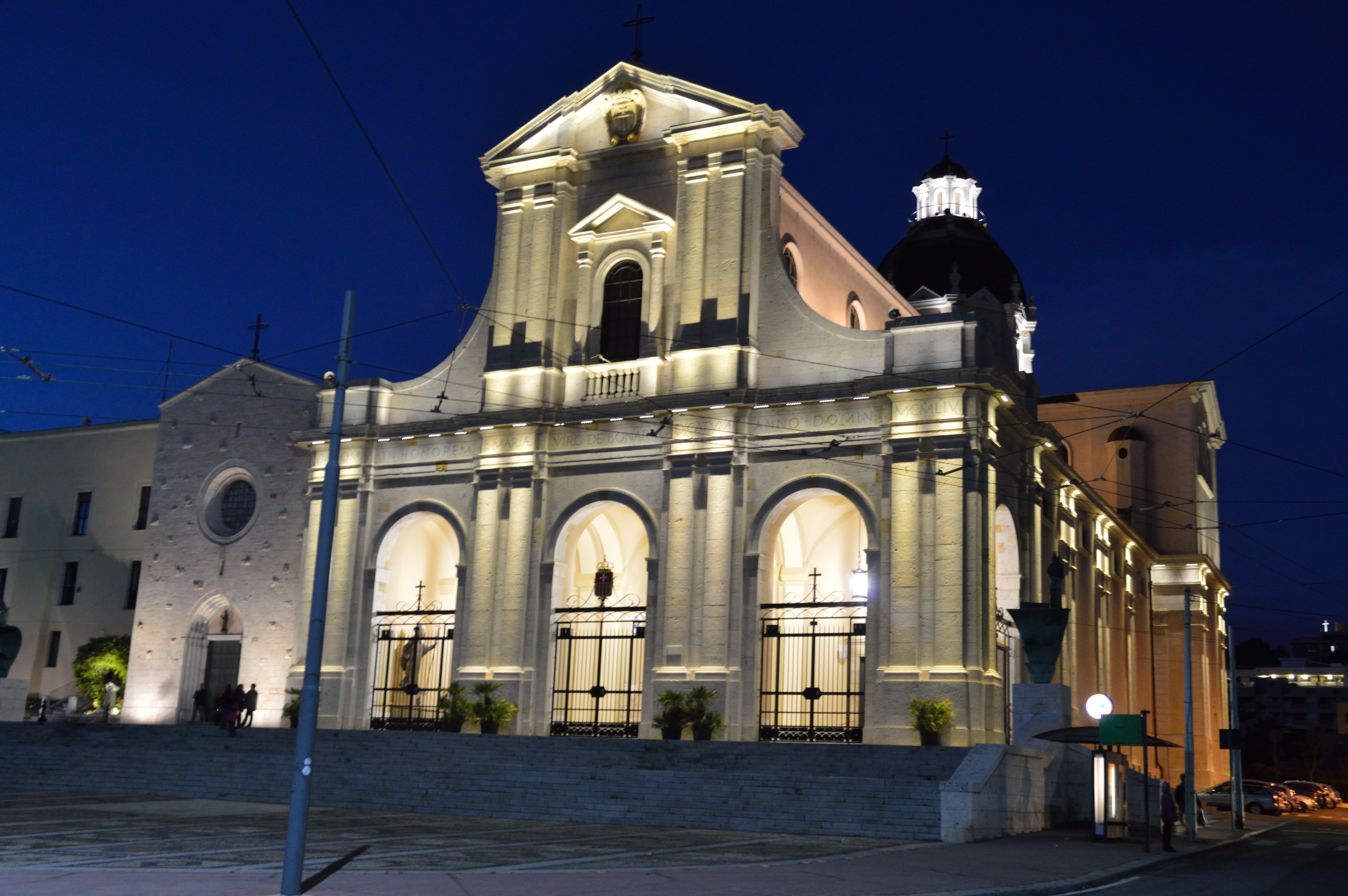
The Basilica of Our Lady of Bonaria

The Basilica of Our Lady of Bonaria (Italian: Basilica di Nostra Signora di Bonaria) is a Catholic basilica and Marian church located in Cagliari, Sardinia, Italy. The basilica is part of a complex of buildings which make up the Shrine of Our Lady of Bonaria. The basilica and the other structures are under the administration of the Order of the Blessed Virgin Mary of Mercy, a religious order which has overseen the care of the shrine continuously since 1335.

Pope Pius XI raised the shrine to the status of Minor Basilica via the decree Calaritana in Civitate on 25 April 1926. The decree was signed and notarized by Cardinal Pietro Gasparri.

== History ==
At the beginning of the 18th century, the Order of the Blessed Virgin Mary of Mercy (Mercedarian Friars) conceived of a great basilica in honour of Our Lady of Bonaria. The new church would, it was planned at the time, contain the original 13th-century Sanctuary of Our Lady of Bonaria inside, as a chapel. This original Sanctuary currently exists as a separate building standing beside the Basilica.

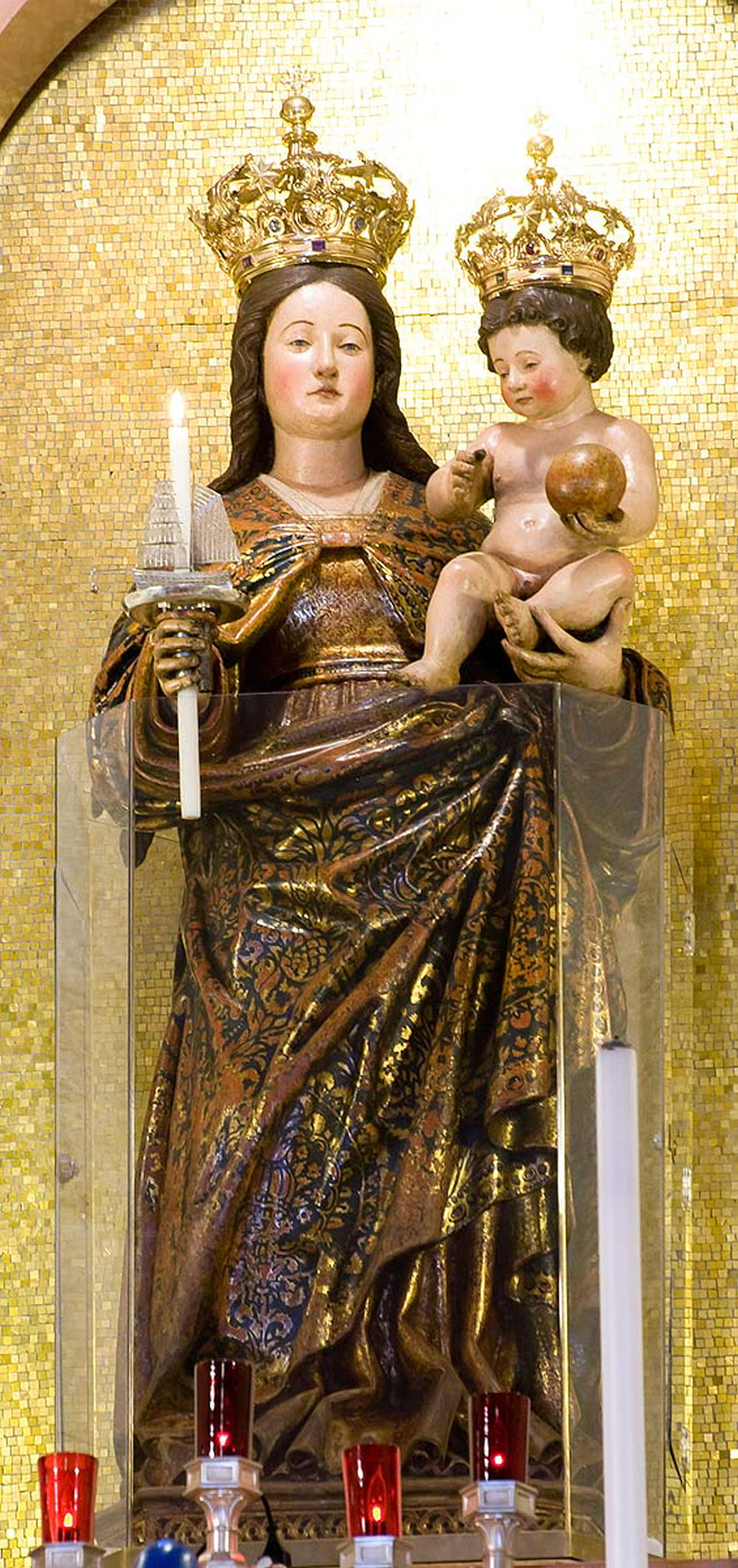
Our Lady of Bonaria statue. Crowned by the decree of Pope Benedict XVI in 2008

Work began in the basilica in 1704. After a number of different interventions and long pauses between one century and another, was it finally completed in 1960. The original planner for the project was Antonio Felice De Vincenti, a military engineer who designed it in the Piedmontese baroque style. He also had a wooden model of the Basilica project constructed. The work was unable to continue, though, for lack of funds. After several interruptions, they began again towards the end of 18th century, this time entrusting the task to the tutelage of De Vincenti's pupil Giuseppe Viana, also a military engineer. The new supervisor was not keen on his master's plan, however: the idea of the great baroque Basilica was, therefore, abandoned for a more sobre classical construction.

== Bombardment ==
The basilica was inaugurated and opened for worship at the beginning of the second half of the 20th century. It suffered serious damage in 1943 during the allied bombardments which struck Cagliari. The bombs caused irreparable damage: the frescoes were completely destroyed, as were a large number of other treasures. In the post-war period, the patient and slow task of reconstruction began, which only ended in 1998, for Easter. Vitally important to the success of the restoration was the contribution of Cagliari City Council. Inside the Basilica, near the entrance door, a series of texts and photos document the history of the church, showing how it looked before and after the restructuring.

== Apostolic visit ==
The Basilica was merited a Pontifical visitation by Pope Benedict XVI on 8 September 2008. On that occasion he bestowed a Golden Rose to the enshrined Marian image. Pope Francis also visited the shrine in 2013.
