= Timeline of Messina =

The following is a timeline of the history of the city of Messina, Sicily, Italy.

== Prior to 18th century ==
- 730 BCE - Chalcidians take settlement from the Siculi; town renamed "Zancle".
- 671 BCE - Samians take Zancle.
- 397 BCE - Settlement sacked by Carthaginian forces in the Battle of Messene.
- 343 BCE - Carthaginians ousted by forces of Timoleon.
- 282 BCE - Mamertines take Messina (approximate date).
- 241 BCE - Messina becomes a civitas foederata.
- 35 BCE - Messina attacked by forces of Octavian.
- 520 CE - Roman Catholic diocese of Messina active (approximate date).
- 535 CE - Belisarius of the Byzantine Empire takes Sicily.
- 843 - Arabs in power over most of the island, including Messina.
- 902 - Fall of Taormina to the Saracens. The Muslim conquest of the island had begun in 826. Some time between the fall of Syracuse in 878 and the fall of Taormina in 902, the imperial administrator and military commander for the Thema of Sicily, the Strategos, moves across the strait to Rhegion, in Calabria.
- 965 - Fall of Rometta, an outpost near Messina, and the last imperial possession on the island of Sicily. After this event, the Byzantine military post of "Strategos of Sicily" is altered to "Strategos of Calabria" in the chroniclers' lists.
- 1038 - George Maniakes liberates Messina and the eastern third of Val Demone, and carries on with the annexation of the eastern coast of Val di Noto, also liberating Syracuse.
- 1061 - Normans arrive in the area. They respect the native population.
- 1098 - Messina Cathedral construction begins.
- 1190 - Messina is sacked, looted, and burned by forces of the Angevin King Richard, including the emblematic, Basilian Monastery of San Salvatore, on the pretext of the Norman King William's widow, Joan, and Richard's sister, not receiving her husband's inheritance from the new King of Sicily, Tancred .
- 1194 - Henry VI, Holy Roman Emperor in power in Sicily.
- 1197 - Messina Cathedral consecrated.
- 1232
  - Messina issues gold coin.
  - Economic unrest.
- 1282
  - Messina revolts against the Angevin Kingdom of Naples, joining the other rest of Sicily in the Sicilian Vespers.
  - The city is besieged for five weeks by an Angevin army under Charles I of Anjou, before the approach of an Aragonese army relieves the city.
  - Aragonese rule begins.
- 1296 - Fair begins.
- 1301 - Messina is besieged by an Angevin army and Aragonese fleet. Despite a famine, the city holds and is relieved by autumn.
- ca.1430 - Birth of Antonello da Messina a painter.
- 1473 - Printing press in operation.
- 1535 - Entry of Charles V, Holy Roman Emperor into Messina.
- 1545 - Forte Gonzaga (fort) built.
- 1546 - Forte del Santissimo Salvatore (fort) built.
- 1548 - Jesuit College (Messina) founded.
- 1616 - Palazzo del Monte di Pietà (Messina) built.
- 1638 - Orto Botanico "Pietro Castelli" dell'Università di Messina (garden) established.
- 1674 - Messina revolt against Spanish rule begins.
- 1686 - Real Cittadella (fort) built.
- 1693 - 1693 Sicily earthquake.

== 18th-19th centuries ==
- 1713 - Spanish rule ends.
- 1728 - Accademia Peloritana dei Pericolanti (learned society) founded.
- 1743 - Plague.
- 1757 - Statua dell'Immacolata (Messina) (monument) erected.
- 1783 - Earthquake.
- 1806 - Museum opens.
- 1838 - University of Messina established.
- 1848 - Sicilian revolution of 1848.
- 1850 - Population: 97,074.
- 1854
  - State Archive of Messina established.
  - Cholera outbreak.
- 1860 - July: Garibaldi enters city.
- 1866 - Railway station opens.
- 1871
  - Ferrovia Messina-Siracusa (railway) in operation.
  - Population: 111,854.
- 1881 - Population: 126,497.
- 1889
  - Ferrovia Palermo-Messina (railway) begins operating.
  - Messina Marittima railway station opens.
- 1890 - Messina-Barcellona Pozzo di Gotto Tram begins operating.
- 1892 - First section of Messina-Giampilieri Tram begins operating.
- 1896 - Strait of Messina ferry begins operating.
- 1900 - Messina Football Club formed.

== 20th century ==
- 1908 - 28 December: 1908 Messina earthquake.
- 1911 - Population: 126,557.
- 1921 - Population: 177,196.
- 1932 - Stadio Giovanni Celeste (stadium) opens.
- 1935 - Archivio Storico Comunale (city archives) established.
- 1936 - Population: 191,966.
- 1943 - City bombed in the Allied invasion of Sicily during World War II.
- 1952 - Gazzetta del Sud newspaper begins publication.
- 1955
  - June: International conference on European economic integration held in Messina.
  - Pylons erected in the Strait of Messina to hold an electric power line.
- 1959 - Messina Grand Prix (car race) begins.
- 1979 - International Rally of Messina (car race) begins.
- 1985 - March: Sicilian local election, 1985 held.

== 21st century ==
- 2003 - Tram begins operating.
- 2004 - Stadio San Filippo (stadium) opens.
- 2009
  - October: 2009 Messina floods and mudslides.
  - Palazzo della cultura built.
- 2010 - S.S.D. Città di Messina (football club) formed.
- 2013
  - June: Local election held; Renato Accorinti becomes mayor.
  - Population: 242,267.
- 2018 - Local election held; Cateno De Luca becomes mayor.
- 2022 - Local election held; Federico Basile becomes mayor.

== See also ==
- Messina history
- History of Messina
- List of mayors of Messina
- History of Sicily
- Timelines of other cities in the macroregion of Insular Italy:^{(it)}
  - Sardinia: Timeline of Cagliari
  - Sicily: Timeline of Catania, Palermo, Syracuse, Trapani

== Bibliography ==
=== in English ===
- William Smith, ed. (1872) [1854]. "Messana". Dictionary of Greek and Roman Geography. London: John Murray. hdl:2027/hvd.ah5cur.
- John Ramsay McCulloch (1877), "Messina", A Dictionary, Practical, Theoretical, and Historical, of Commerce and Commercial Navigation, Hugh G. Reid, ed., London: Longmans, Green, and Co., hdl:2027/njp.32101079877088
- "Messina". Chambers's Encyclopaedia. London. 1901. hdl:2027/njp.32101065312926.
- Ismar Elbogen (1904), "Messina", Jewish Encyclopedia, vol. 8, New York, hdl:2027/mdp.49015002282243
- "Messina", Southern Italy and Sicily (15th ed.), Leipzig: Karl Baedeker, 1908 + 1867 ed.
- Ashby, Thomas (1910). "Messina" . Encyclopædia Britannica. Vol. 18 (11th ed.). pp. 194–195.
- Benjamin Vincent (1910), "Messina", Haydn's Dictionary of Dates (25th ed.), London: Ward, Lock & Co., hdl:2027/uc2.ark:/13960/t41r6xh8t
- Roy Domenico (2002). "Sicily: Messina". Regions of Italy: a Reference Guide to History and Culture. Greenwood. pp. 287+. ISBN 0313307334.
- Christopher Kleinhenz, ed. (2004). "Messina". Medieval Italy: an Encyclopedia. Routledge. pp. 705+. ISBN 0415939291.

=== in Italian ===
- Cajo Domenico Gallo (1756). Annali della citta si Messina (in Italian). Francesco Gaipa.
- Guida per la cittá di Messina (in Italian) (2nd ed.). Giuseppe Fiumara. 1841.
- "Messina". Nuova Enciclopedia Italiana (in Italian). Vol. 13 (6th ed.). Torino: Unione Tipografico-Editrice Torinese. 1882. hdl:2027/uc1.c2649811.
- "Messina". Guida generale di Sicilia e Malta: storica, artistica, commerciale (in Italian) (3rd ed.). Catania: Niccolò Giannotta. 1889.
- "Messina". Sicilia. Guida d'Italia (in Italian). Milan: Touring Club Italiano. 1919. p. 96+. hdl:2027/uc1.$b535988.
- Paolo Militello (2008). Ritratti di città in Sicilia e a Malta: XVI-XVII secolo (in Italian). Palermo: Officina di Studi Medievali. ISBN 978-88-88615-78-3.
