= Timeline of Cagliari =

The following is a timeline of the history of the city of Cagliari, Sardinia, Italy.

== Prior to 18th century ==
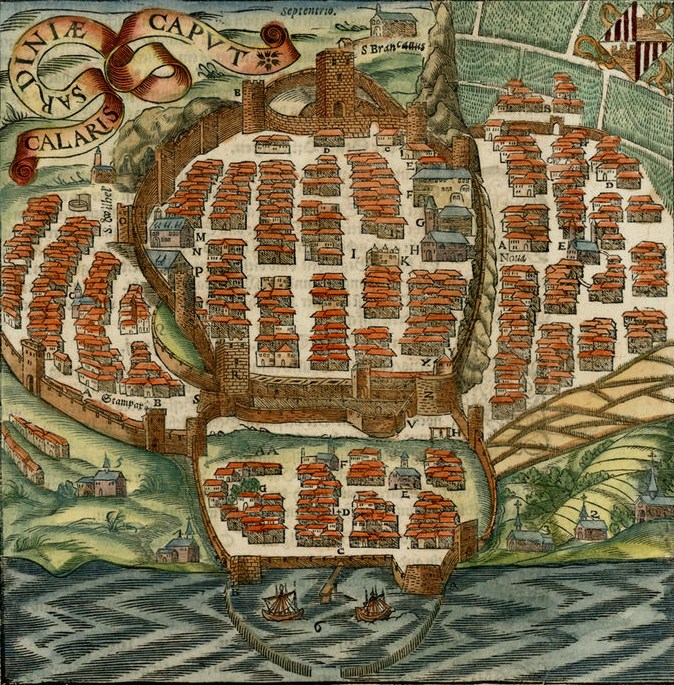
Map of Cagliari from Münster's Cosmographia, 1544

- 2nd. half of the 4th millennium BCE - The territory of Cagliari is inhabited by people of the so-called neolithic civilization of Ozieri. Some Domus de Janas were dug in Mount Saint Elias
- 2nd. half of the 3rd millennium BCE - The territory of Cagliari is the core of the Chalcolithic civilization of Monte Claro
- 8th C. BCE - Caralis founded by Phoenicians from Tyre, Lebanon.
- 510 BCE - Caralis occupied by the Cartaginians
- 238 BCE - Caralis occupied by the Romans
- Early 1st C. CE - Granting of the title of Municipium
- 2nd C. CE - Roman Amphitheatre of Cagliari built.
- 5th C. CE - Roman Catholic diocese of Cagliari established (approximate date).
- 5th C. CE - Basilica of San Saturnino built.
- 485 - Vandals in power in Sardinia.^{(it)}
- 533 - Sardinia taken by forces of Justinian I.
- 10th C. - The title of imperial Protospatharios is granted to the Iudex Sardiniae Turcoturios (Tουρκοτούριος), resident in Caralis, by the Byzantine emperors.
- 1020 - Giudicato of Cagliari established.
- 1297 - Pope Boniface VIII invests the Kings of Aragon with Sardinia.
- 1305 - Torre di San Pancrazio (tower) built.
- 1307 - Torre dell'Elefante (tower) built.
- 1312 - Cagliari Cathedral built.
- 1323 - Siege of Castel di Castro begins during the Aragonese conquest of Sardinia.
- 1325
  - December: Battle of the Golfo di Cagliari.
  - Shrine of Our Lady of Bonaria construction begins.
- 1326 - Siege of Castel di Castro ends; Aragonese in power.
- 1348 - Black Death plague.
- 1492 - Jews in Sardinia expelled per Alhambra Decree.^{(it)}
- 1606 - University of Cagliari established.
- 1688 - Population: 17,390.^{(it)}

== 18th-19th centuries ==
- 1714 - Aragonese ousted; Sardinia "assigned to Austria" per Treaty of Utrecht.
- 1720 - Sardinia ceded by the Austrians to the duke of Savoy, in exchange for Sicily.
- 1764 - Palazzo dell'Università (Cagliari) built.
- 1792 - Biblioteca universitaria di Cagliari (library) opens.
- 1793 - Cagliari "bombarded by the French fleet."
- 1804 - Reale Società Agraria ed Economica di Cagliari (learned society founded.
- 1821 - Population: 31,935.^{(it)}
- 1840 - Giardini Pubblici (Cagliari) (garden) opens.
- 1859 - Circondario di Cagliari (administrative region) established.
- 1871 - Cagliari-Villasor railway begins operating.
- 1879 - Cagliari railway station opens.
- 1883 - Ferrovia Cagliari-Golfo Aranci (railway) begins operating.
- 1889 - L'Unione Sarda newspaper begins publication.
- 1893
  - Trams in Cagliari begin operating.
  - Popolo Sardo newspaper begins publication.
- 1897 - Population: 44,624.

== 20th century ==
- 1901 - Bastione di Saint Remy terrace built.
- 1911 - Population: 60,101.
- 1920 - Cagliari Football Club formed.
- 1923 - Stadio Amsicora (stadium) opens.
- 1931 - Population: 92,689.^{(it)}
- 1933 - Palazzo del Comando legione carabinieri Sardegna built.
- 1943 - Bombing of Cagliari in World War II.
- 1948 - Fiera di Cagliari (fair) begins.
- 1951 - Population: 130,511.^{(it)}
- 1952 - Trolleybuses in Cagliari begin operating.
- 1961 - Population: 173,540.^{(it)}
- 1965 - Almanacco di Cagliari begins publication.
- 1970 - Stadio Sant'Elia (stadium) opens.
- 1981 - Population: 219,648.^{(it)}
- 1990 - Part of 1990 FIFA World Cup football contest held in Cagliari.
- 1993 - Galleria comunale d'arte di Cagliari (museum) active.

== 21st century ==
- 2001 - Population: 164,249.^{(it)}
- 2008 - Cagliari light rail begins operating.
- 2011
  - Mediateca del Mediterraneo (library) opens in the Stampace quartiere.
  - Local election held; Massimo Zedda becomes mayor.^{(it)}
- 2013 - Population: 149,575.

== See also ==
- History of Cagliari
- List of mayors of Cagliari
- List of bishops of Cagliari
- List of giudici of Caligari, 11th-13th centuries
- History of Sardinia
- Timelines of other cities in the macroregion of Insular Italy:^{(it)} Sicily: Catania, Messina, Palermo, Syracuse, Trapani

== Bibliography ==
=== in English ===
- Abraham Rees (1819), "Cagliari", The Cyclopaedia, London: Longman, Hurst, Rees, Orme & Brown
- William Smith, ed. (1872) [1854]. "Caralis". Dictionary of Greek and Roman Geography. London: John Murray. hdl:2027/hvd.ah5cuq.
- "Cagliari". Chambers's Encyclopaedia. London. 1901. hdl:2027/hvd.hn52jk.
- "Cagliari", Jewish Encyclopedia, vol. 3, New York, 1902, hdl:2027/mdp.49015002282292
- Ashby, Thomas (1910). "Cagliari" . Encyclopædia Britannica. Vol. 4 (11th ed.). pp. 945–946.
- "Cagliari", Southern Italy and Sicily (16th ed.), Leipzig: Karl Baedeker, 1912
- Roy Domenico (2002). "Sardinia: Cagliari". Regions of Italy: a Reference Guide to History and Culture. Greenwood. pp. 259+. ISBN 0313307334.

=== in Italian ===
- Nicola Bernardini, ed. (1890). "Provincia di Cagliari". Guida della stampa periodica italiana (in Italian). Lecce: R. Tipografia editrice salentina dei fratelli Spacciante. hdl:2027/njp.32101074983378. (List of newspapers)
- "Cagliari", Enciclopedia Italiana (Treccani) (in Italian), 1930
