= Timeline of Syracuse, Sicily =

The following is a timeline of the history of the city of Syracuse, Sicily, Italy. Syracuse was the main city of Sicily from 5th century BCE to 878 CE.

== Prior to 17th century ==
- 8th C. BCE – Settlement established by Corinthian Greeks.^{(it)}
- 663 BCE - Founded the settlement of Akrai.
- 643 BCE - Founded the settlement of Casmenae.
- 6th C. BCE – Greek Theatre of Syracuse built.
- 598 BCE - Founded the settlement of Kamarina.
- 498–491 BCE - Hippocrates of Gela threatened the independence of Syracuse.
- 491–478 BCE - Gelon is tyrant of Syracuse.
- 480 BCE - Gelon defeats Carthage at the Battle of Himera.
- 415–413 BCE – Syracuse besieged by Greek forces.
- 397 BCE - Siege of Syracuse (397 BC)
- 343 BCE - Siege of Syracuse (343 BC)
- 311-309 BCE - Siege of Syracuse (311–309 BC)
- 287 BCE – Birth of mathematician Archimedes (approximate date).
- 278 BCE - Siege of Syracuse (278 BC)
- 214 BCE – Siege of Syracuse (213–212 BC) by Roman forces.
- 44 BCE – People of Syracuse (and Sicily) gain Roman citizenship.
- 2nd–4th C. CE – Roman Catholic diocese of Siracusa established.
- 3rd C. CE – Death of bishop Marcian of Syracuse.
- 278–280 CE – Syracuse sacked by Franks.
- 304 – Death of Christian St. Lucia Of Syracuse during the Diocletianic Persecution.
- 535 – Syracuse taken by Belisarius of the Byzantine Empire.
- 668 – 15 September: Assassination of Byzantine emperor Constans II.
- 827-828 - Siege of Syracuse (827–828).
- 877–878 – Siege of Syracuse (877–878) by Aghlabid forces.
- 1088 – Syracuse besieged by forces of Roger I of Sicily.
- 1140 – Earthquake.^{(it)}
- 1239 – Castello Maniace built.
- 1397 – Palazzo Montalto built on Ortygia island.
- 1448 – Unrest.
- 1542 – Earthquake.^{(it)}

== 17th–19th centuries ==
- 1608 – Caravaggio paints "Burial of St. Lucy" in the Santa Lucìa alla Badìa, Siracusa.
- 1633 – Palazzo Vermexio built.
- 1673 – Porta Ligny (gate) built.
- 1693 – 1693 Sicily earthquake.
- 1710 – 9 November: Naval Battle of Syracuse (1710) fought near city during the War of the Spanish Succession.
- 1753 – Cathedral of Syracuse built.
- 1757 – Earthquake.
- 1779 – Palazzo Beneventano del Bosco rebuilt.
- 1790 – Maritime navigation school established.
- 1847 - Fountain of Arethusa remodelled into current form
- 1854 – Archbishop's Palace built.
- 1860 – 1 August: Forces of Garabaldi arrive in city.
- 1861 – Population: 19,590.
- 1862 – Syracuse Chamber of Commerce established.
- 1865 – Province of Syracuse created.
- 1867 – Biblioteca comunale (library) founded.
- 1870 – Gazzetta di Siracusa newspaper begins publication.
- 1871
  - Siracusa railway station opens.
  - Messina–Syracuse railway (railway) begins operating.
- 1880 – Tamburo newspaper begins publication.
- 1881 - Population: 21,739.
- 1886
  - Siracusa–Gela–Canicattì railway (railway) begins operating.
  - Museo Archeologico Nazionale di Siracusa (museum) opens.
- 1892 – Stazione di Siracusa Marittima (train station) opens at the Port of Syracuse.
- 1897
  - Teatro Comunale (Syracuse) (theatre) opens.
  - Population: 25,740.

== 20th century ==
- 1907 – Fontana di Diana (fountain) installed in Piazza Archimede.
- 1911 – Population: 40,835.
- 1915 – Ferrovia Siracusa-Solarino (railway) begins operating.
- 1920 – Giornale di Siracusa newspaper in publication.
- 1924
  - 13 August: Benito Mussolini visits city.
  - A.S. Siracusa (football club) formed.
- 1928 – Strada statale 115 Sud Occidentale Sicula (Trapani-Syracuse roadway) opens.
- 1932 – Stadio Nicola De Simone (stadium) opens in Santa Lucia.
- 1934 – Palazzo delle Poste (post office) built.
- 1938
  - Stazione di Targia industrial railway station begins operating.
  - Monumento ai Caduti italiani d'Africa construction begins at Piazza dei Cappuccini.
- 1941 – Bombing of Syracuse during World War II begins.^{(it)}
- 1943: 9–10 July: City taken by British forces.
- 1948 – Bellomo Palace Regional Gallery opens.
- 1950 – Augusta-Priolo petrochemical complex begins operating near city.
- 1951 – Population: 66,090.^{(it)}
- 1953
  - Madonna delle Lacrime (weeping statue) allegedly occurs, according to tradition.
  - Syracuse Commonwealth War Graves Commission Cemetery established near city.
- 1960
  - Regata internazionale Siracusa-Malta (race) begins.
  - Syracuse Aquarium opens (approximate date).
- 1961 – Population: 83,205.^{(it)}
- 1963 – Archivio di Stato di Siracusa (state archives) active.
- 1990 – 13 December: 1990 Carlentini earthquake occurs.
- 1991 – Population: 125,941.^{(it)}
- 1994 – Santuario della Madonna delle Lacrime (Syracuse) built.
- 1996 – U.S. Siracusa (football club) active.
- 1999
  - Compagnia dei pupari Vaccaro-Mauceri (puppet theatre) established.
  - Giambattista Bufardeci becomes mayor.

== 21st century ==
- 2005 – Syracuse and the Rocky Necropolis of Pantalica designated an UNESCO World Heritage Site.
- 2008 – Roberto Visentin becomes mayor.
- 2009
  - April: G8 Ambiente meeting of environmental leaders held in city.
  - Pista ciclabile Rossana Maiorca (bike path) opens.
- 2013
  - June: Italian local elections, 2013 held.
  - 20 September: 400+ refugees of the Syrian Civil War arrive at port of Syracuse.
  - Giancarlo Garozzo becomes mayor.
  - Siracusa Calcio football club active.
  - Population: 118,644.
- 2015 – Regional Libero consorzio comunale di Siracusa created (replacing Province of Syracuse).

== See also ==
- Syracuse history
- History of Syracuse, Sicily
- Ancient Syracuse
- Origins of Syracuse (in Italian)
- History of Syracuse: Greek period (in Italian)
- History of Syracuse: medieval period (in Italian)
- History of Syracuse: modern period (circa 16th-19th centuries; in Italian)
- History of Syracuse: fascist period (in Italian)
- History of Syracuse: contemporary period (in Italian)
- List of mayors of Syracuse, Sicily
- List of bishops of Syracuse
- History of Sicily
- Timelines of other cities in the macroregion of Insular Italy:^{(it)}
  - Sardinia: Timeline of Cagliari
  - Sicily: Timeline of Catania, Messina, Palermo, Trapani

== Bibliography ==
=== in English ===
- William Smith, ed. (1872) [1854]. "Syracusae". Dictionary of Greek and Roman Geography. London: John Murray. hdl:2027/hvd.ah5cur.
- George Henry Townsend; Frederick Martin (1877), "Syracuse", A Manual of Dates (5th ed.), London: Frederick Warne & Co., hdl:2027/wu.89097349427
- "Syracuse". Chambers's Encyclopaedia. London. 1901. hdl:2027/njp.32101065312959.
- "Syracuse", Southern Italy and Sicily (15th ed.), Leipzig: Karl Baedeker, 1908 (+ 1867 ed.)
- Douglas Brooke Wheelton Sladen (1908). "Syracuse History (timeline)". Sicily, the New Winter Resort: An Encyclopaedia of Sicily (2nd ed.). Methuen.
- Freeman, Edward Augustus; Ashby, Thomas (1910). "Syracuse" . Encyclopædia Britannica. Vol. 26 (11th ed.). pp. 296–302.
- Benjamin Vincent (1910), "Syracuse", Haydn's Dictionary of Dates (25th ed.), London: Ward, Lock & Co., hdl:2027/uc2.ark:/13960/t41r6xh8t
- Herbermann, Charles George (1912). "Syracuse". Catholic Encyclopedia. New York.
- Christopher Kininmonth (1965). "Syracuse". Travellers' Guide to Sicily. Jonathan Cape. pp. 172–208 – via Open Library.
- Trudy Ring, ed. (1996). "Syracuse". Southern Europe. International Dictionary of Historic Places. Vol. 3. Fitzroy Dearborn. p. 674+. ISBN 9781134259656. OCLC 31045650.
- Roy Domenico (2002). "Sicily: Syracuse". Regions of Italy: a Reference Guide to History and Culture. Greenwood. pp. 291+. ISBN 0313307334.
- Christopher Kleinhenz, ed. (2004). "Syracuse". Medieval Italy: an Encyclopedia. Routledge. ISBN 0415939291.
- Colum Hourihane, ed. (2012). "Syracuse". Grove Encyclopedia of Medieval Art and Architecture. Oxford University Press. ISBN 978-0-19-539536-5.

=== in Italian ===
- "Siracusa". Guida generale di Sicilia e Malta: storica, artistica, commerciale (in Italian) (3rd ed.). Catania: Niccolò Giannotta. 1889. hdl:2027/gri.ark:/13960/t0zp6s27f. (+ via Internet Archive)
- Nicola Bernardini, ed. (1890). "Provincia di Siracusa". Guida della stampa periodica italiana (in Italian). Lecce: R. Tipografia editrice salentina dei fratelli Spacciante. hdl:2027/njp.32101074983378.
- "Siracusa". Sicilia. Guida d'Italia (in Italian). Milan: Touring Club Italiano. 1919. p. 349+. hdl:2027/uc1.$b535988.
- "Siracusa", Enciclopedia Italiana (in Italian), 1936
- M. Guido (1960). Siracusa: Guida storico pratica ai suoi principali monumenti ed ai luoghi d'interesse (in Italian).
- T. Carpinteri (1983). Siracusa, città fortificata (in Italian).
- Siracusa e provincia (in Italian). Milan: Touring Club Italiano. 1999. ISBN 978-88-365-1253-9.

== Images ==
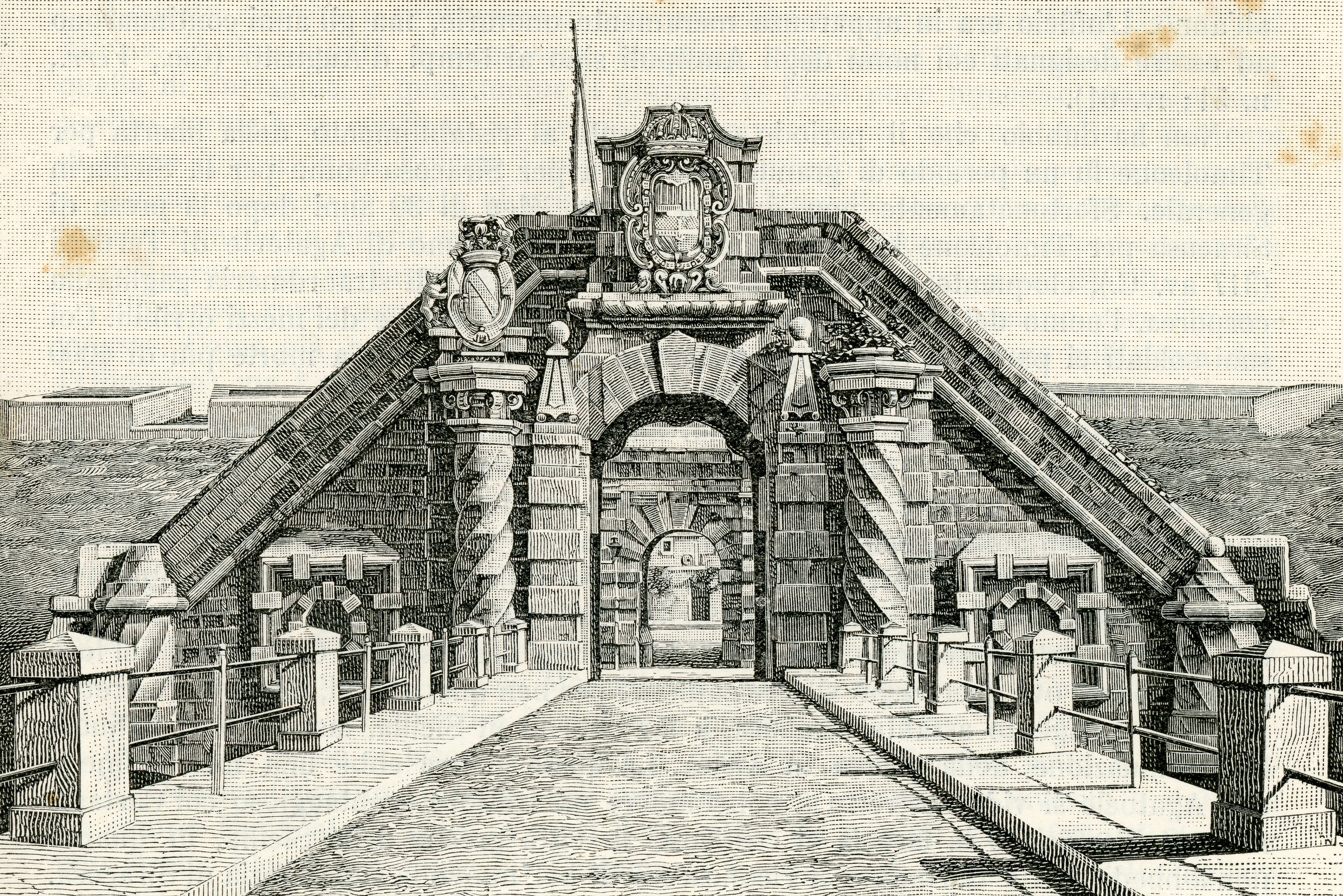
Porta Ligny, built 1673, demolished 1893

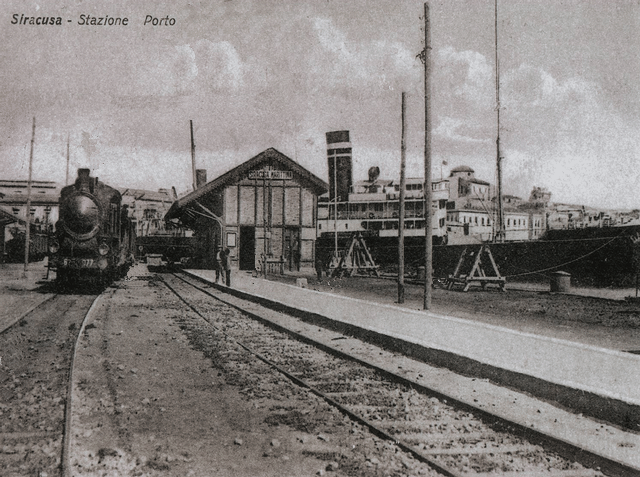
Stazione Siracusa Marittima, opened in 1892

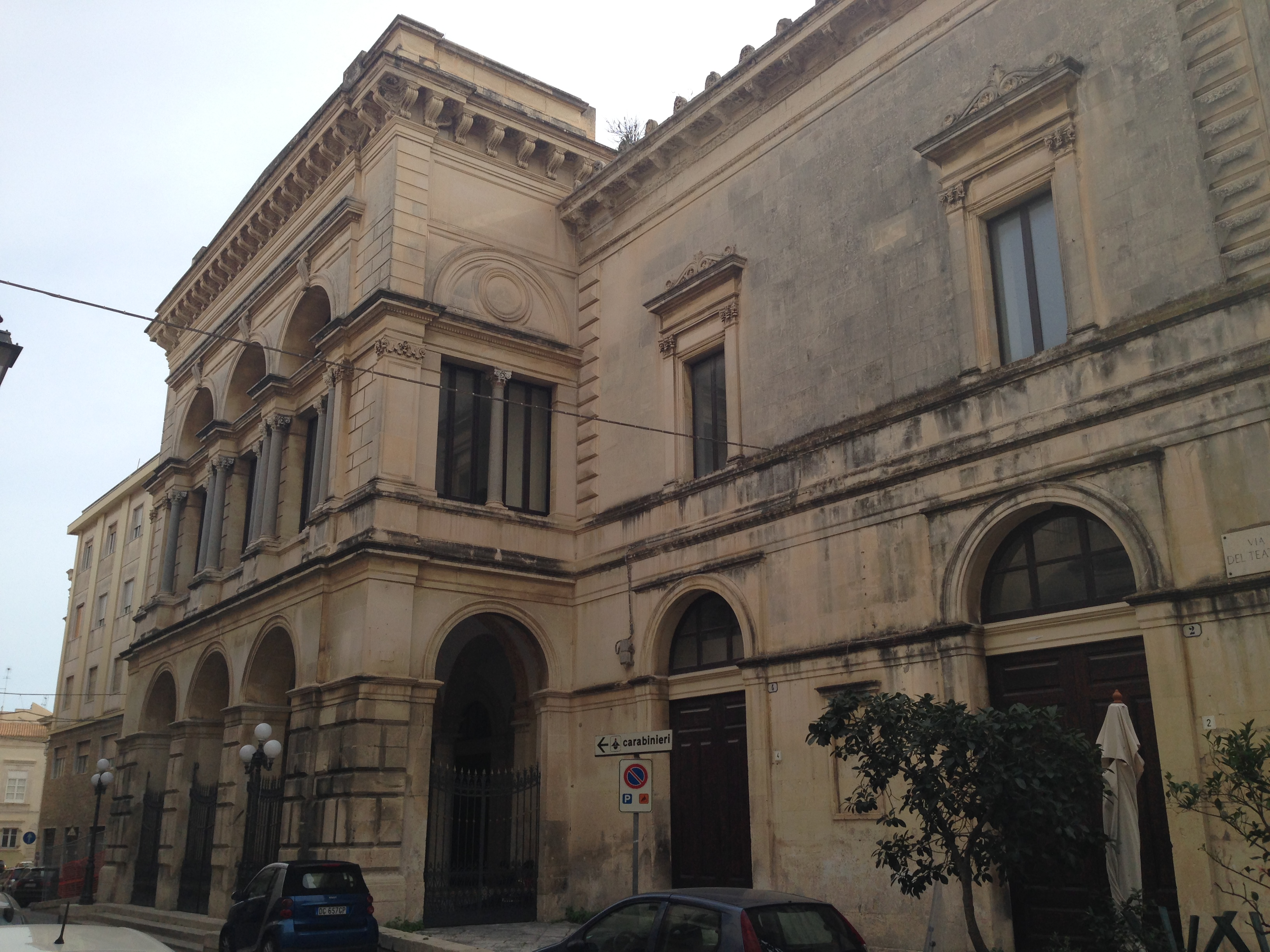
Teatro Communale, opened in 1897

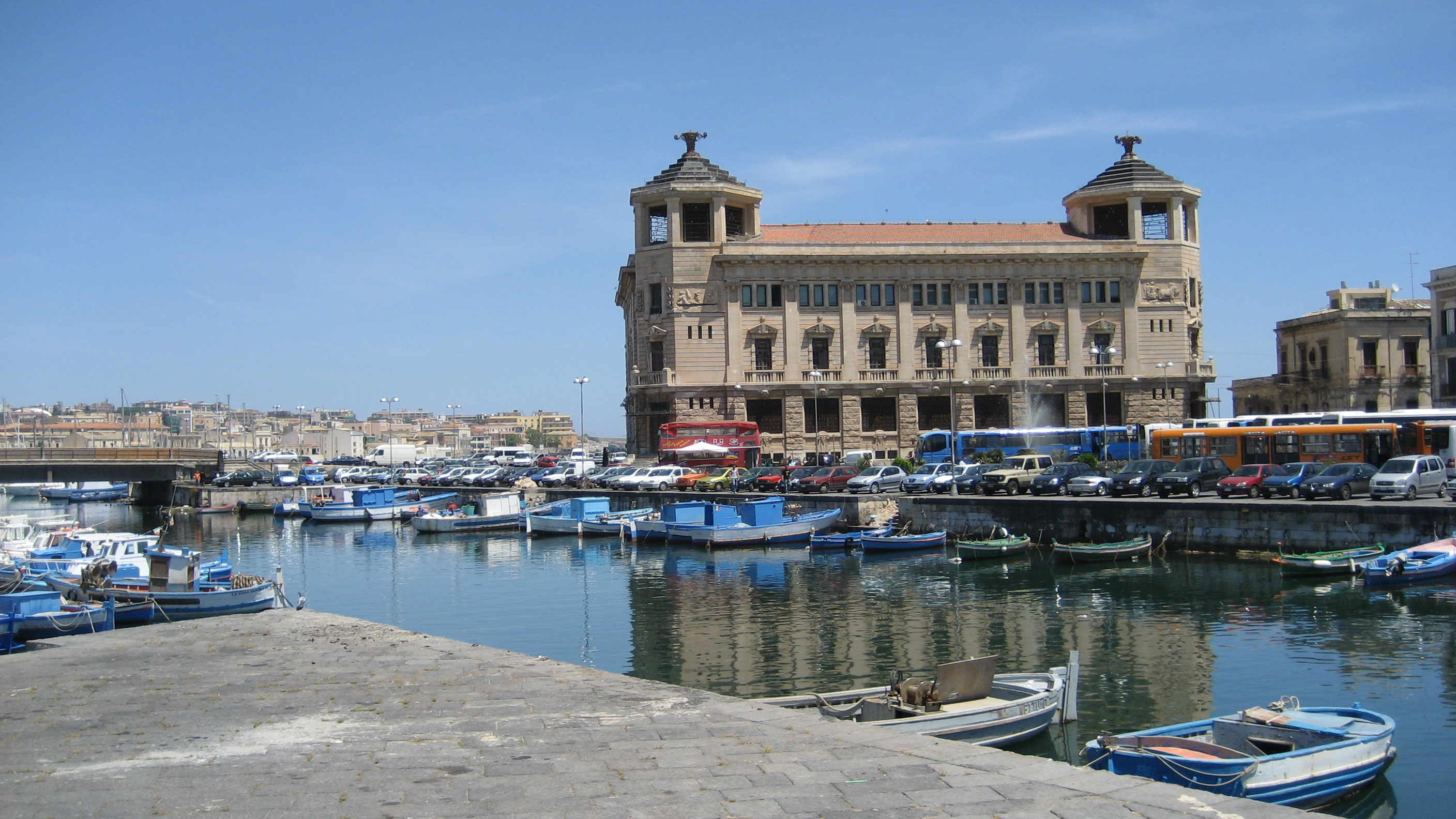
Post Office, built 1935 (photo 2006)

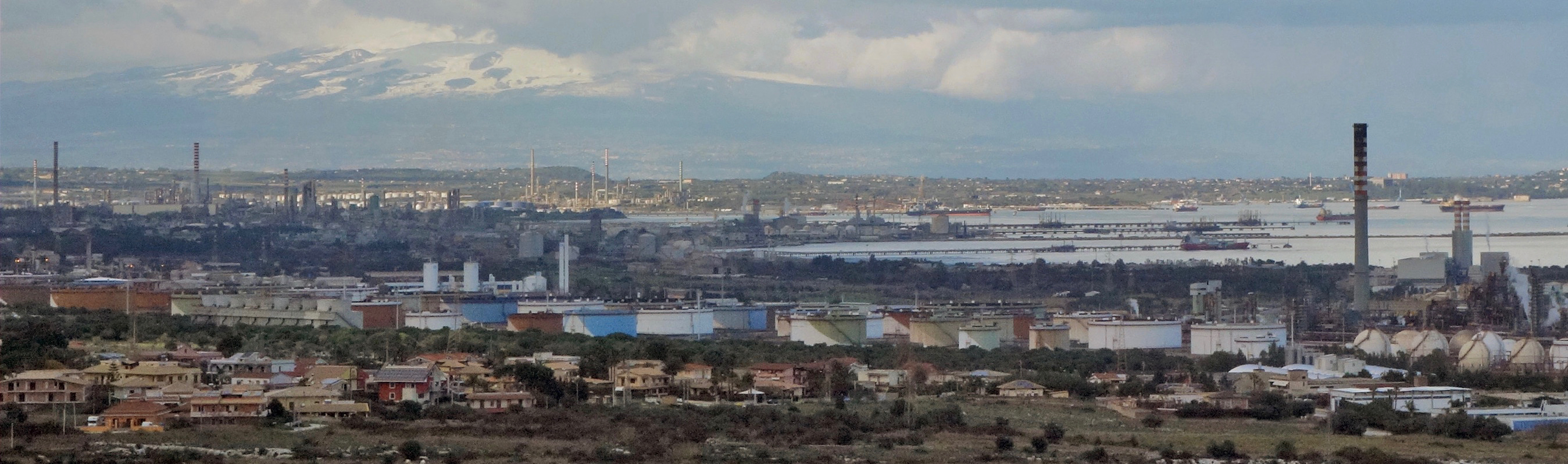
Augusta-Priolo industrial complex near city, est. circa 1950 (photo 2015)
