= Timeline of Trapani =

The following is a timeline of the history of the city of Trapani, Sicily, Italy.

== Prior to 20th century ==
- 249 BCE - Naval Battle of Drepana fought; Carthaginian forces win
- 241 BCE - Romans in power
- 395 CE - Drepanum becomes part of the Eastern Roman Empire.
- 827 CE - Muslim conquest of Sicily; town called "Tarabanis"
- 1097 - Town taken by forces of Norman Roger I of Sicily
- 1266 - Battle of Trapani
- 1282 - Aragonese in power
- 1284 - Naval siege of Trapani during the War of the Sicilian Vespers
- 1332 - Madonna dell' Annunziata church built near town
- 1421 - Trapani Cathedral construction begins.
- 1432 - Trapani besieged by forces of Louis III of Anjou
- 1570 - Population: 16,286
- 1726 - Earthquake^{(it)}
- 1748 - Population: 17,311
- 1760 - Madonna of Trapani church rebuilt.
- 1798 - Population: 24,330
- 1820 - Uprising against Bourbon rule
- 1830 - Biblioteca Fardelliana (library) opens.
- 1844 - Roman Catholic Diocese of Trapani established
- 1848 - Sicilian revolution of 1848
- 1849 - Teatro Garibaldi (theatre) built
- 1861 - Circondario di Trapani (administrative region) established
- 1880 - Stazione di Trapani (railway station) opens.
- 1897 - Population: 49,992

== 20th century ==
- 1905 - Trapani Calcio football team formed.
- 1906 - Population: 47,578.
- 1911 - Population: 59,593
- 1915 - Trapani tram begins operating.
- 1937 - Ferrovia Palermo-Trapani railway begins operating.
- 1952 - Trapani trolleybus begins operating.
- 1960 - Stadio Polisportivo Provinciale (stadium) opens in nearby Erice.
- 1961 - Trapani–Birgi Airport opens.
- 1968 - January: 1968 Belice earthquake

== 21st century ==
- 2001 - Local election held; Girolamo Fazio becomes mayor.
- 2012 - Local election held; Vito Damiano becomes mayor.
- 2013 - Population: 68,967

== See also ==
- Trapani history
- History of Trepani
- List of mayors of Trepani
- History of Sicily
- Timelines of other cities in the macroregion of Insular Italy:^{(it)}
  - Sardinia: Timeline of Cagliari
  - Sicily: Timeline of Catania, Messina, Palermo, Syracuse

== Bibliography ==
=== in English ===
- William Smith, ed. (1872) [1854]. "Drepanum". Dictionary of Greek and Roman Geography. London: John Murray. hdl:2027/hvd.ah5cuq.
- "Trapani". Chambers's Encyclopaedia. London. 1901.
- Ashby, Thomas (1910). "Trapani" . Encyclopædia Britannica. Vol. 27 (11th ed.). p. 213.
- "Trapani", Southern Italy and Sicily (16th ed.), Leipzig: Karl Baedeker, 1912
- Roy Domenico (2002). "Sicily: Trapani". Regions of Italy: a Reference Guide to History and Culture. Greenwood. pp. 293+. ISBN 0313307334.

=== in Italian ===
- Giuseppe Maria Di Ferro [in Italian] (1825). Guida per gli stranieri in Trapani.
- Pagliani, Stefano; Boccardo, Gerolamo (1887), "Trepani", Nuova Enciclopedia Italiana (in Italian), vol. 22 (6th ed.)
- Gaetano Battaglia (1904). "Trapani". Guida descrittiva della Sicilia (in Italian). Palermo: G. Pedone Lauriel.
- "Trapani". Sicilia. Guida d'Italia (in Italian). Milan: Touring Club Italiano. 1919. hdl:2027/uc1.$b535988.
- "Trapani", Enciclopedia Italiana (Treccani) (in Italian), 1937
