= Timeline of Catania =

The following is a timeline of the history of the city of Catania in the Sicily region of Italy.

== Prior to 18th century ==
- 729 BCE – Catina founded by Naxians.
- 476 BCE – Hiero I of Syracuse expels residents to Leontini; settlement renamed "Aetna".
- 461 BCE – Settlement named "Catina" again.
- 403 BCE – Catina taken by forces of Dionysius I of Syracuse.
- 263 BCE – Catina taken by Roman forces during the First Punic War.
- 122 BCE – Mount Etna eruption of 122 BCE.
- 2nd C. CE – Amphitheatre of Catania
- 251 CE – Lava stream threatens the town.
- 535 CE – Belisarius of the Byzantine Empire takes Sicily.
- 4th–5th C. CE – Roman Catholic diocese of Catania active.
- 902 CE – Catania "sacked by the Saracens" during the Muslim conquest of Sicily.
- 1090 – Catania Cathedral founded.
- 1169 – February: 1169 Sicily earthquake.
- 1194 – Catania sacked by forces of Henry VI, Holy Roman Emperor.
- 1232 – Political unrest.
- 1239 – Castello Ursino (castle) ordered to be constructed by Emperor Frederick II, King of Sicily.
- 1282 – War of the Sicilian Vespers.
- 1296 – "Parliament at Catania elected Frederick of Aragon king of Sicily."
- 1350 – Castello Ursino (castle) built.
- 1435 – "Social unrest."
- 1434 – University of Catania opens.
- 1647 – Political unrest.
- 1669 – 1669 Etna eruption causes destruction in region near city.
- 1687 – Chiesa di San Nicolò l'Arena (church) construction begins.
- 1693 – January: 1693 Sicily earthquake causes much destruction in city.

== 18th–19th centuries ==
- 1709 – Palazzo Tezzano construction begins.
- 1713 – San Benedetto church built.
- 1737 – Fontana dell'Elefante (fountain) installed in the Piazza del Duomo.
- 1755 – University Library established.
- 1817 – February: Earthquake.^{(it)}
- 1824 – Accademia Gioenia (learned society) formed.
- 1843 – Catania provincial archives established.
- 1858 – Orto Botanico dell'Università di Catania (garden) established.
- 1862 – August: Catania "held by Garibaldi."
- 1866
  - Cimitero monumentale di Catania (cemetery) established.
  - Catania Centrale railway station inaugurated.
- 1869 – Stazione di Catania Marittima (train station) opens.
- 1871 – Population: 84,397.
- 1876 – Observatory established.
- 1881 – Population: 100,417.
- 1882 – Vincenzo Bellini monument erected in the Piazza Stesicoro.
- 1883 – Giardino Bellini (park) opens.
- 1890 – Teatro Massimo Bellini (theatre) opens.

== 20th century ==
- 1905 – Catania tram begins operating.
- 1908 – Calcio Catania football club formed.
- 1911 – Population: 210,703.
- 1915 – Catania-Acireale Tram begins operating.
- 1929 – Calcio Catania (football club) founded.
- 1930 – Campo dei cent'anni (stadium) opens.
- 1931 – Biblioteche riunite Civica e A. Ursino Recupero (library) established.
- 1937 – Stadio Cibali (stadium) opens.
- 1943 – July: City bombed in the Allied invasion of Sicily during World War II.
- 1944 – 14 December: Palazzo degli Elefanti (city hall) burns down.
- 1945 – La Sicilia newspaper begins publication.
- 1949
  - Società Catanese Trasporti (transit entity) established.
  - Catania trolleybus begins operating.
- 1954 – Teatro Metropolitan (Catania) opens.
- 1957 – Demolition of San Berillo neighborhood.
- 1958 – Teatro Stabile di Catania founded.
- 1963 – State Archive of Catania active.
- 1969 – Teatro Verga (theatre) built.
- 1971
  - City divided into 26 administrative units.^{(it)}
  - Population: 400,048.
- 1978 – City reorganized into 17 administrative units.^{(it)}
- 1988 – Enzo Bianco becomes mayor.
- 1995 – City reorganized into 10 administrative units: Barriera-Canalicchio, Borgo-Sanzio, Centro-San Cristoforo-Angeli Custodi, Monte Po-Nesima, Ognina-Picanello-Stazione, San Giorgio-Librino, San Giovanni Galermo, San Giuseppe La Rena-Zia Lisa, San Leone-Rapisardi, and Trappeto-Cibali.^{(it)}
- 1997 – PalaCatania arena opens.
- 1998 – Mercati Generali nightclub in business near city.
- 1999 – Catania Metro begins operating.
- 2000 – Umberto Scapagnini becomes mayor.

== 21st century ==
- 2007 – Catania–Fontanarossa Airport new terminal opens.
- 2012 – 28 October: Sicilian regional election, 2012 held.
- 2013
  - City reorganized into six administrative units: Borgo Sanzio, Centro San Giovanni Galermo-Trappeto-Cibali, Centro Storico, Monte Po-Nesima-San Leone-Rapisardi, Picanello-Ognina-Barriera-Canalicchio, and San Giorgio-Librino-San Giuseppe La Rena-Zia Lisa-Villaggio Sant'Agata.^{(it)}
  - Population: 290,678 city; 1,077,113 province.

== See also ==
- Catania history
- History of Catania
- List of mayors of Catania
- History of Sicily
- Timelines of other cities in the macroregion of Insular Italy:^{(it)}
  - Sardinia: Timeline of Cagliari
  - Sicily: Timeline of Messina, Palermo, Syracuse, Trapani

== Bibliography ==
=== in English ===
- William Smith, ed. (1872) [1854]. "Catana". Dictionary of Greek and Roman Geography. London: John Murray. hdl:2027/hvd.ah5cuq.
- "Catania". Chambers's Encyclopaedia. London. 1901. hdl:2027/hvd.hn52jk.
- "Catania", Southern Italy and Sicily (15th ed.), Leipzig: Karl Baedeker, 1908 + 1867 ed.
- Ashby, Thomas (1910). "Catania" . Encyclopædia Britannica. Vol. 5 (11th ed.). pp. 502–503.
- Benjamin Vincent (1910), "Catania", Haydn's Dictionary of Dates (25th ed.), London: Ward, Lock & Co., hdl:2027/uc2.ark:/13960/t41r6xh8t
- David Abulafia (2004). "Catania". In Christopher Kleinhenz (ed.). Medieval Italy: an Encyclopedia. Routledge. pp. 192–193. ISBN 0415939291.
- Colum Hourihane, ed. (2012). "Catania". Grove Encyclopedia of Medieval Art and Architecture. Oxford University Press. ISBN 978-0-19-539536-5.

=== in Italian ===
- Descrizione di Catania e delle cose notevoli nei dintorni de essa (in Italian). Catania: Pietro Giuntini. 1841.
- "Elenco delle biblioteche del regno: Catania". Statistica del Regno d'Italia: biblioteche (in Italian). Florence. 1865. hdl:2027/uc1.c2742343. (List of libraries)
- Catania e sue vicinanze: manuale pel viaggiatore [Catania and vicinity: handbook for travelers] (in Italian). Catania: C. Galatola. 1867.
- "Catania", Nuova Enciclopedia Italiana (in Italian), vol. 5 (6th ed.), Unione tipografico-editrice torinese, 1878, hdl:2027/uc1.c2649803
- "Catania". Guida generale di Sicilia e Malta: storica, artistica, commerciale (in Italian) (3rd ed.). Catania: Niccolò Giannotta. 1889.
- Nicola Bernardini, ed. (1890). "Provincia di Catania". Guida della stampa periodica italiana (in Italian). Lecce: R. Tipografia editrice salentina dei fratelli Spacciante. hdl:2027/njp.32101074983378.
- Malfitana, Daniele; Mazzaglia, Antonino (2023). Catania – la città antica e quella del futuro: archeologia, topografia, urbanistica per la riqualificazione dello spazio urbano. Roma Bristol: "L'Erma" di Bretschneider. ISBN 9788891328717.
- "Catania". Sicilia. Guida d'Italia (in Italian). Milan: Touring Club Italiano. 1919. p. 291+. hdl:2027/uc1.$b535988.
- Giuseppe Giarrizzo (1986). Catania (in Italian). Rome: Laterza.
- Paolo Militello (2008). Ritratti di città in Sicilia e a Malta: XVI-XVII secolo (in Italian). Palermo: Officina di Studi Medievali. ISBN 978-88-88615-78-3.
