= Palace of Culture (disambiguation) =

Palace of Culture is the term for major club-houses in the former Soviet Union and the rest of the Eastern bloc

Palace of Culture may refer to:

- Palace of Culture (Tolyatti), Russia
- Palace of Culture (Tel Aviv), Israel
- Palace of Culture of Tirana, Albania
- Palace of Culture (Novosibirsk), Russia
- Palace of Culture (Messina), Italy
- Palace of Culture Energetik, an abandoned palace of culture in the town of Pripyat, in the Chernobyl Exclusion Zone, Ukraine
- Palace of Culture (Târgu Mureș), Romania
- Palace of Culture (Iași), Romania
- Palace of Culture and Sports, Bulgaria
- Palace of Culture and Science, Poland
