= Saturninus of Cagliari =

Roman Catholic saint and martyr

Saint Saturninus of Cagliari
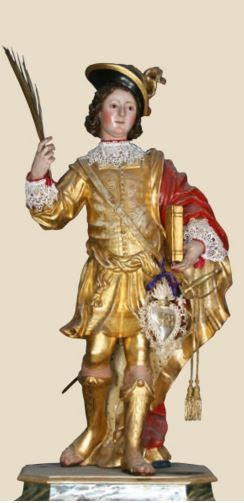
- Statue of Saint Saturninus in Basilica of Saint Saturninus in Cagliari, Italy
- Born: May 23, 285 AD; Sardinia, Italy
- Died: October 30, 304 AD; Cagliari, Sardinia, Italy
- Venerated in: Roman Catholic Church
- Major shrine: Basilica of San Saturnino, Cagliari
- Feast: October 30
- Patronage: Cagliari

Saint Saturninus of Cagliari (Italian: San Saturnino, Saturno) is venerated as the patron saint of Cagliari. According to Christian tradition, Saturninus was a local martyr –that is, he was killed at Cagliari by order of governor Barbarus. The legend states that he was beheaded for refusing to offer sacrifices to Jupiter during the persecutions of Christians by Diocletian.

However, some scholars have determined that this tradition was invented centuries after the supposed martyrdom, and that the legend was devised a posteriori to attach a story to the name to whom the local ancient basilica was dedicated. But the name of the saint in Sardinian language, "Santu Sadurru" (Saint Saturnus) suggests that there really was the martyrdom of Saturnus, a young Christian by the pagans and the saint was exactly buried where the ancient church was erected.

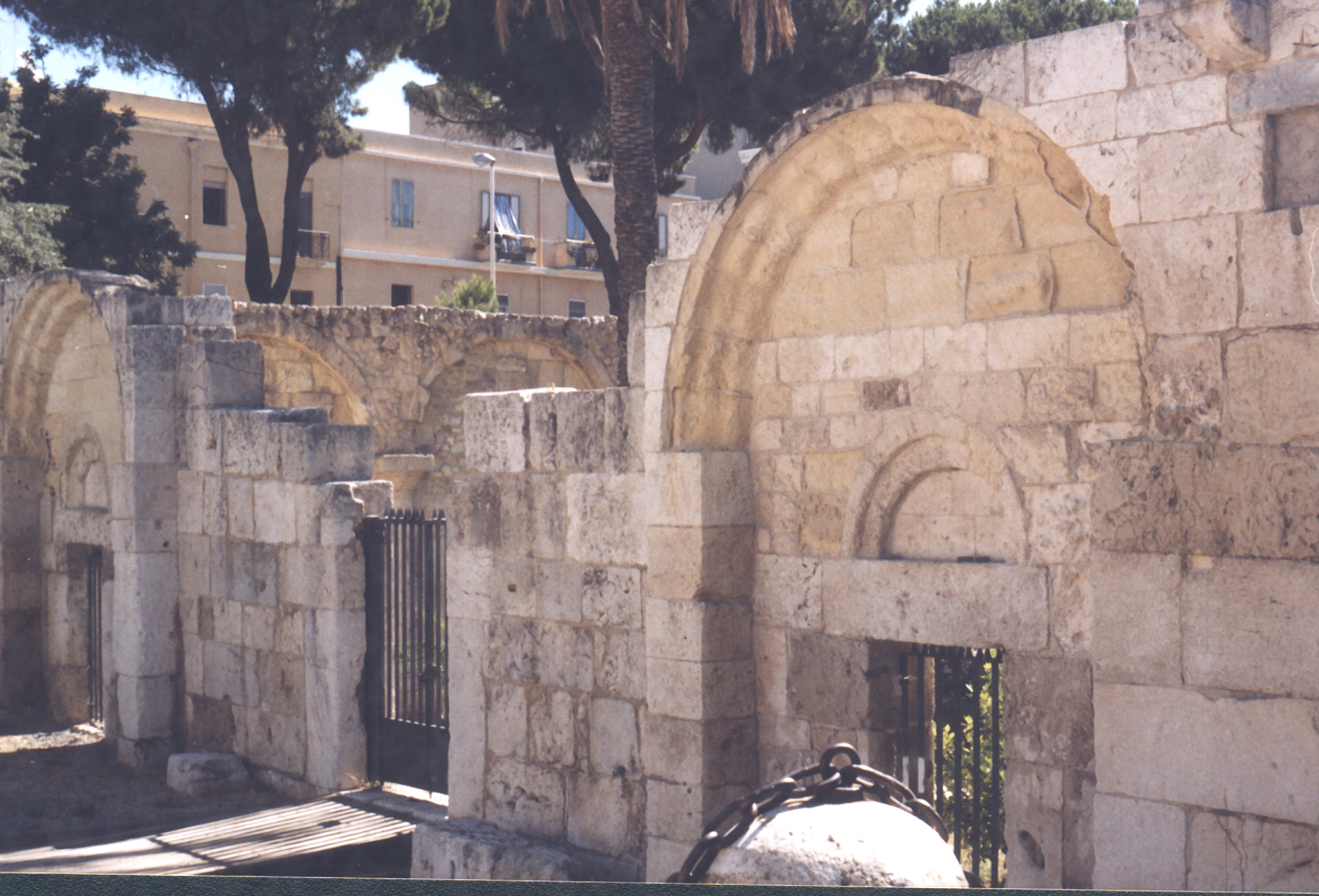
5th century basilica of San Saturnino, Cagliari.

Saint Saturninus was confused with Saturninus of Toulouse (Sernin). "Saturninus" was the name of several other martyrs, including some belonging to the group of the Martyrs of Abitina, and close trading ties and communications between North Africa and Cagliari may have resulted in the cult of a North African saint becoming attached to this Sardinian location.
