= International Rally of Messina =

International Rally of Messina Rally internazionale di Messina
- Part of the Italian Rally Championship
- Host country: Italy
- Rally base: Messina, Italy
- Dates run: 1979 – 2004

International Rally of Messina (in Italian Rally internazionale di Messina) was a former rally competition that was held in Messina, Italy.

== History ==
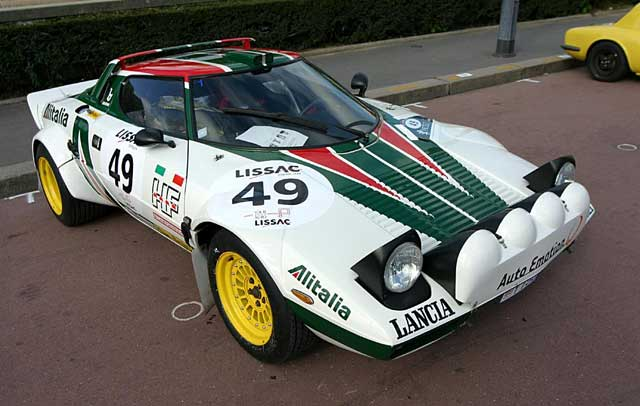
Lancia Stratos won the 1st edition of Rally in 1979

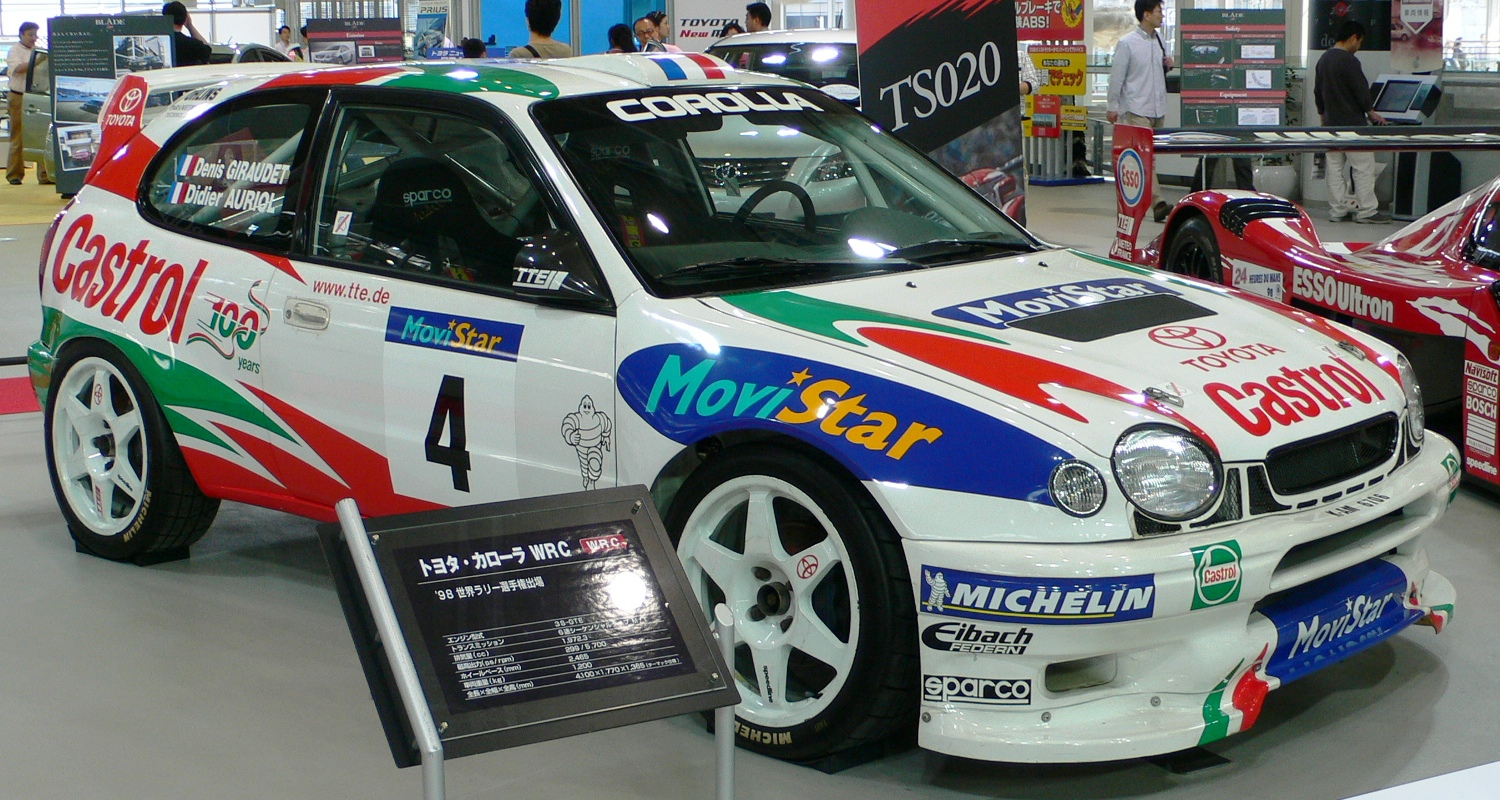
Toyota Corolla WRC won four edition of Rally (1999, 2000, 2003 and 2004)

The event was held for 26 editions, from 1979 to 2004 and was part of the European Rally Championship schedule and the Italian national rally championship.

Many of Italian top drivers for several years fought for the Italian title, because the rally was one of the last race of the season, and often decisive. Among the winners are remembered Andrea Aghini, Franco Cunico and Piero Liatti.

== Editions ==
Ed.	Season	Championship	Driver	Car
1	1979		(Italy) Sergio Montalto	Lancia Stratos
2	1980	Italian rally championship	(Italy) "Dielis"	Porsche 911 SC
3	1981	Italian rally championship	(Italy) Paolo Pasutti	Porsche 911 SC
4	1982	Italian rally championship	(Italy) Ninni Runfola	Lancia Stratos
5	1983		(Italy) Nunzio Panebianco	Opel Kadett GTE
6	1984	Italian rally championship	(Italy) Ninni Runfola	Lancia 037
7	1985	Italian rally championship	(Italy) Roberto Rosselli	Lancia 037
8	1986	Italian rally championship	(Italy) Andrea Zanussi	Peugeot 205 Turbo 16
9	1987	Italian rally championship	(Italy) Piero Liatti	Lancia 037
10	1988	Italian rally championship	(Italy) Maurizio Ferrecchi	Lancia Delta Integrale 8v
11	1989	Italian rally championship	(Italy) Franco Cunico	Ford Sierra Cosworth
12	1990	Italian rally championship	(Italy) Piero Liatti	Lancia Delta Integrale 16v
13	1991	Italian rally championship	(Italy) Franco Cunico	Ford Sierra Cosworth
14	1992	Italian rally championship	(Italy) Piero Longhi	Lancia Delta Integrale 16v
15	1993	Italian rally championship	(Italy) Vanio Pasquali	Ford Sierra Cosworth
16	1994	Italian rally championship	(Italy) Giovanni Russo	Renault Clio Williams
17	1995	Italian rally championship	(Italy) Piero Liatti	Subaru Impreza
18	1996	European Rally Championship; Italian rally championship	(Italy) Andrea Dallavilla	Toyota Celica GT
19	1997	European Rally Championship; Italian rally championship	(Italy) Andrea Dallavilla	Subaru Impreza
20	1998	European Rally Championship; Italian rally championship	(Italy) Andrea Dallavilla	Subaru Impreza
21	1999	European Rally Championship; Italian rally championship	(Italy) Andrea Aghini	Toyota Corolla WRC
22	2000	European Rally Championship; Italian rally championship	(Italy) Piero Longhi	Toyota Corolla WRC
23	2001	European Rally Championship; Italian rally championship	(Italy) Gianluca Vita	Renault Mégane Kit
24	2002	European Rally Championship; Italian rally championship	(Italy) Maurizio Ferrecchi	Peugeot 206 WRC
25	2003	European Rally Championship; Italian rally championship	(Italy) Salvatore Riolo	Toyota Corolla WRC
26	2004	Italian rally championship	(Italy) Alessandro Battaglin	Toyota Corolla WRC

== See also ==
- Messina Grand Prix
