= Palace of Culture (Messina) =

Palace of Culture Antonello da Messina Palacultura Antonello da Messina
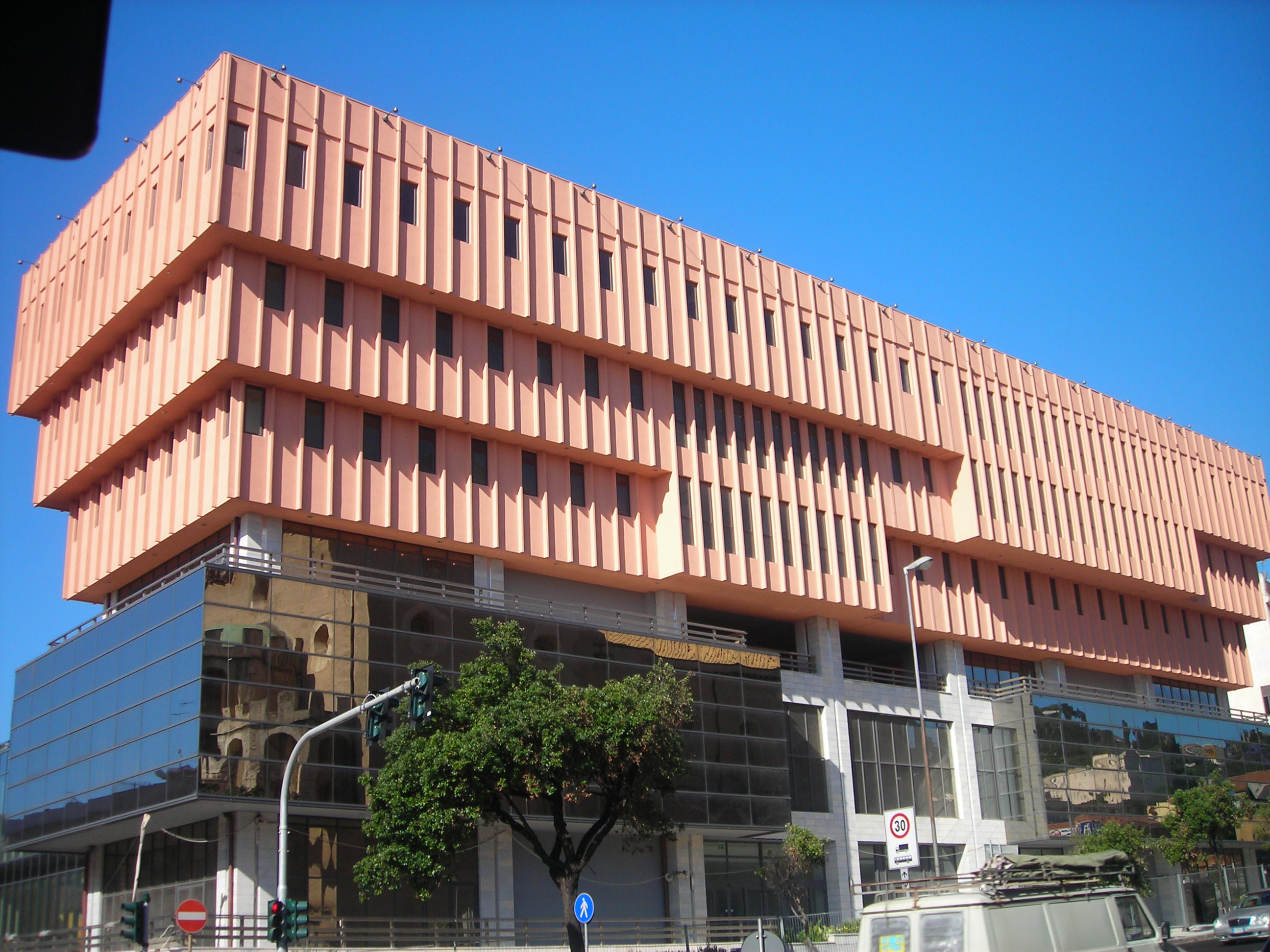
- Interactive map of the Palace of Culture Antonello da Messina; Palacultura Antonello da Messina area

General information
- Architectural style: Brutalist architecture
- Location: Messina, Italy
- Coordinates: 38.19394°N 15.55256°E
- Construction started: 2006
- Completed: 2009
- Client: Comune of Messina

Height
- Height: 25 m

Technical details
- Floor area: 10,300 m^{2} (111,000 sq ft)

Design and construction
- Engineer: Aldo D'Amore; Fabio Basile

The Palace of Culture of Messina, inaugurated to the public as Palacultura Antonello da Messina, on 12 February 2010, is a multipurpose center located at No. 343 of Viale Boccetta in Messina.

== History ==
Realized on a project by the engineers Aldo D'Amore and Fabio Basile of 1975, after various tribulations (including the discovery of some archaeological finds), it finally had the light at the end of the 2000s. More precisely, on 16 April 2009 they were concluded the works and its official inauguration are scheduled for the summer of 2009, was then inaugurated on 12 February 2012 with a conference for the presentation of the works on the Strait of Messina Bridge, in the presence of various authorities such as the President of ANAS and the Strait of Messina (concessionaire of the works of the Bridge), Pietro Ciucci, the President of the Italian railway network Mauro Moretti and the Minister of infrastructures and transports Altero Matteoli.

== Features ==
Located in the central part of viale Boccetta, which represents the first access road for motorists coming from the A20 and A18 motorways to the city of Messina, it is therefore necessarily a first visiting card on its architecture that the city offers visitors. Consisting of three buildings destined to house offices for culture, the largest city library, an 850-seat theater with 4 audiences, orchestra pit and booths for the television broadcasting of events, an auditorium for outdoor music, among the largest and most modern in Italy, and still an exhibition hall located on the terrace of the building's body B.

The inverted pyramid structure was obtained by exploiting the considerable flexibility offered by materials such as concrete and steel, obviously taking into account that Messina is a 1st category seismic zone.

== Disputes ==
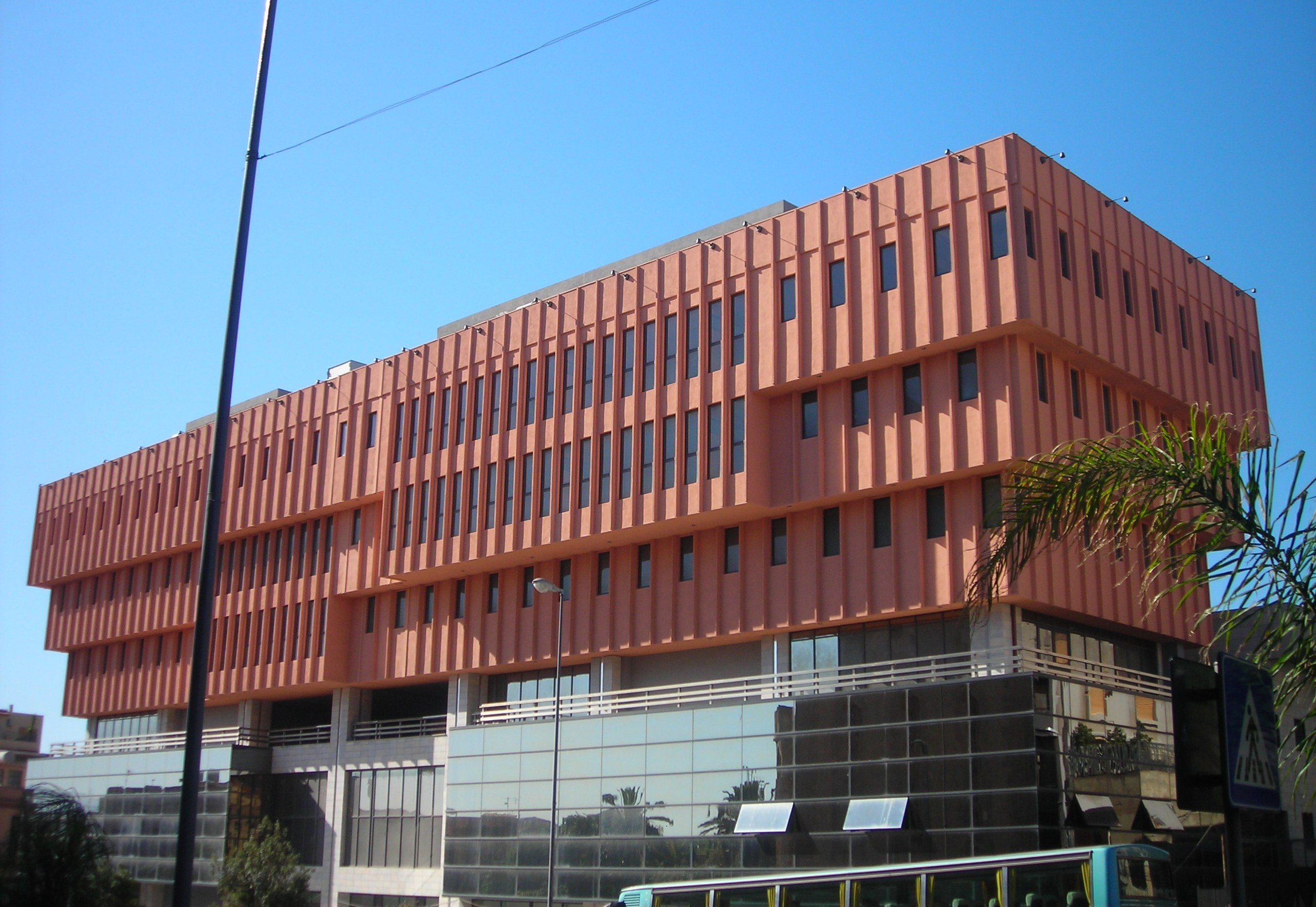
Palace of Culture Antonello da Messina

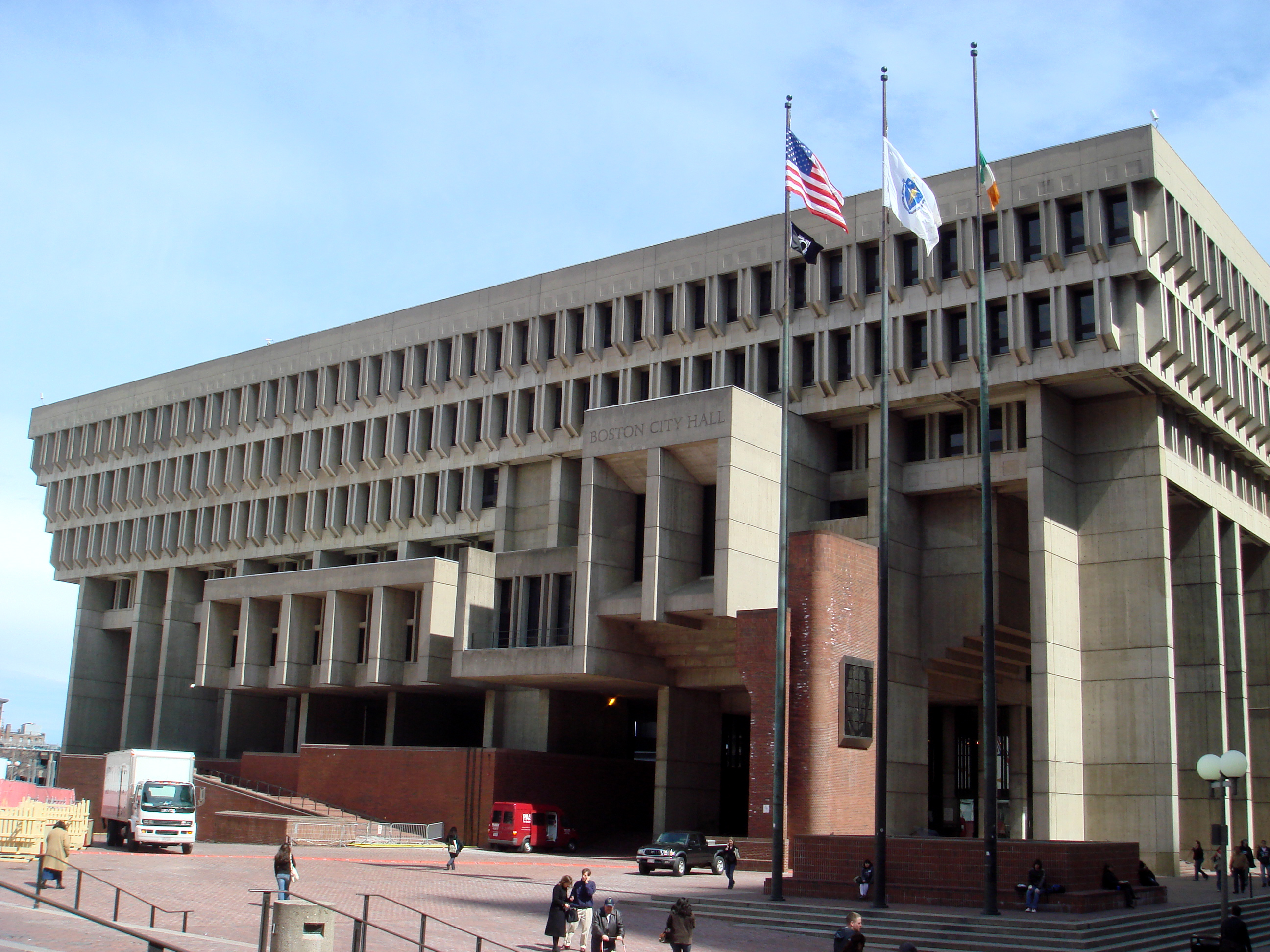
The Boston City Hall

In February 2009 the online newspaper Tempostretto noted a remarkable similarity of the work with the Boston City Hall hypothesizing a plagiarism of the Messina designers. The curious aspect of the story is the fact that the town hall of Boston is dated 1969 and after forty years of life, it risks being demolished.

Another controversy that characterized the troubled construction of the Palacultura, was the discovery, in February 1982, of some archaeological finds dating back to Roman times. The works resumed in February of the following year, but when still the piling was in progress, there was a new suspension in 1985 for the necessary consolidation of an adjacent staircase, these works were completed only in 1993, meanwhile the Municipality of Messina had taken steps to adapt the now obsolete project to the new regulations (safety, parking and so on), also implementing a variant of the project, presented in 1999, which envisaged the extension of the entire structure. Finally, in September 2004 the works were contracted out to the Catanese company Cosedil S.p.A. of the geom. Andrea Vecchio and after less than 5 years the work had the light and its inauguration, scheduled for September 2009, will ensure that the work abandons forever the nickname of queen of the unfinished that has characterized it for 34 long years.

== Gallery ==
Palacultura Antonello da Messina
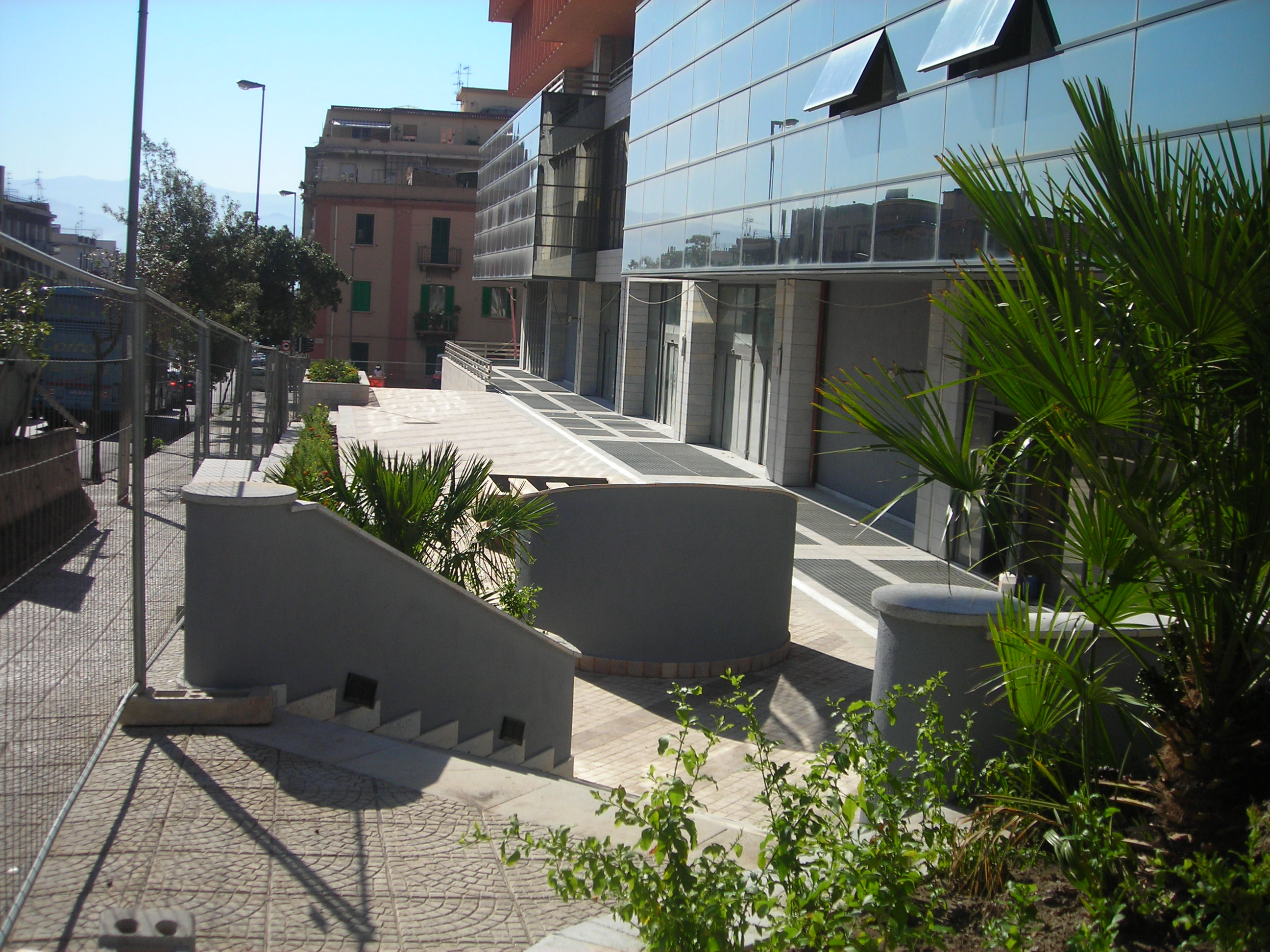
The main entrance

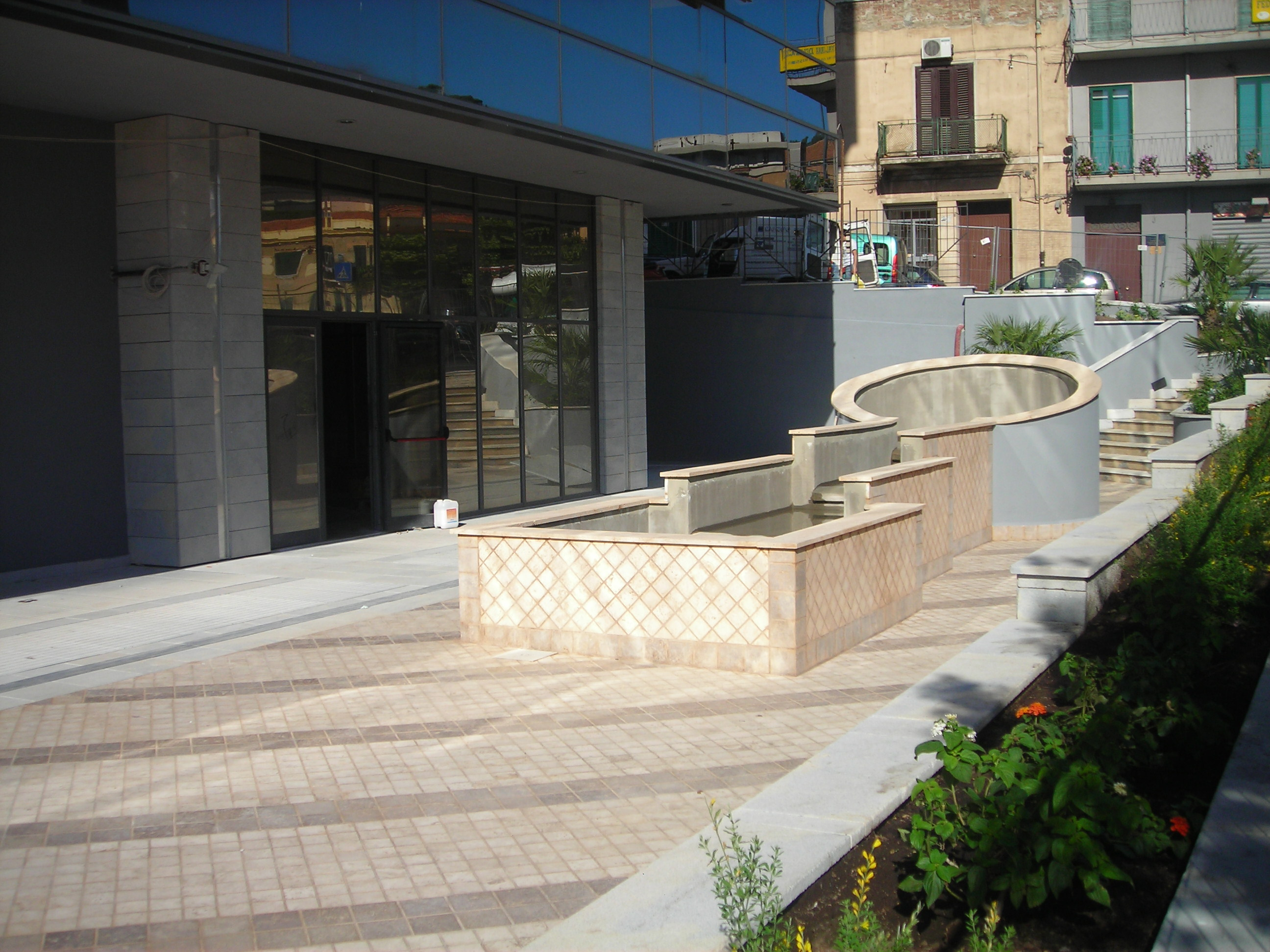
The fountain.

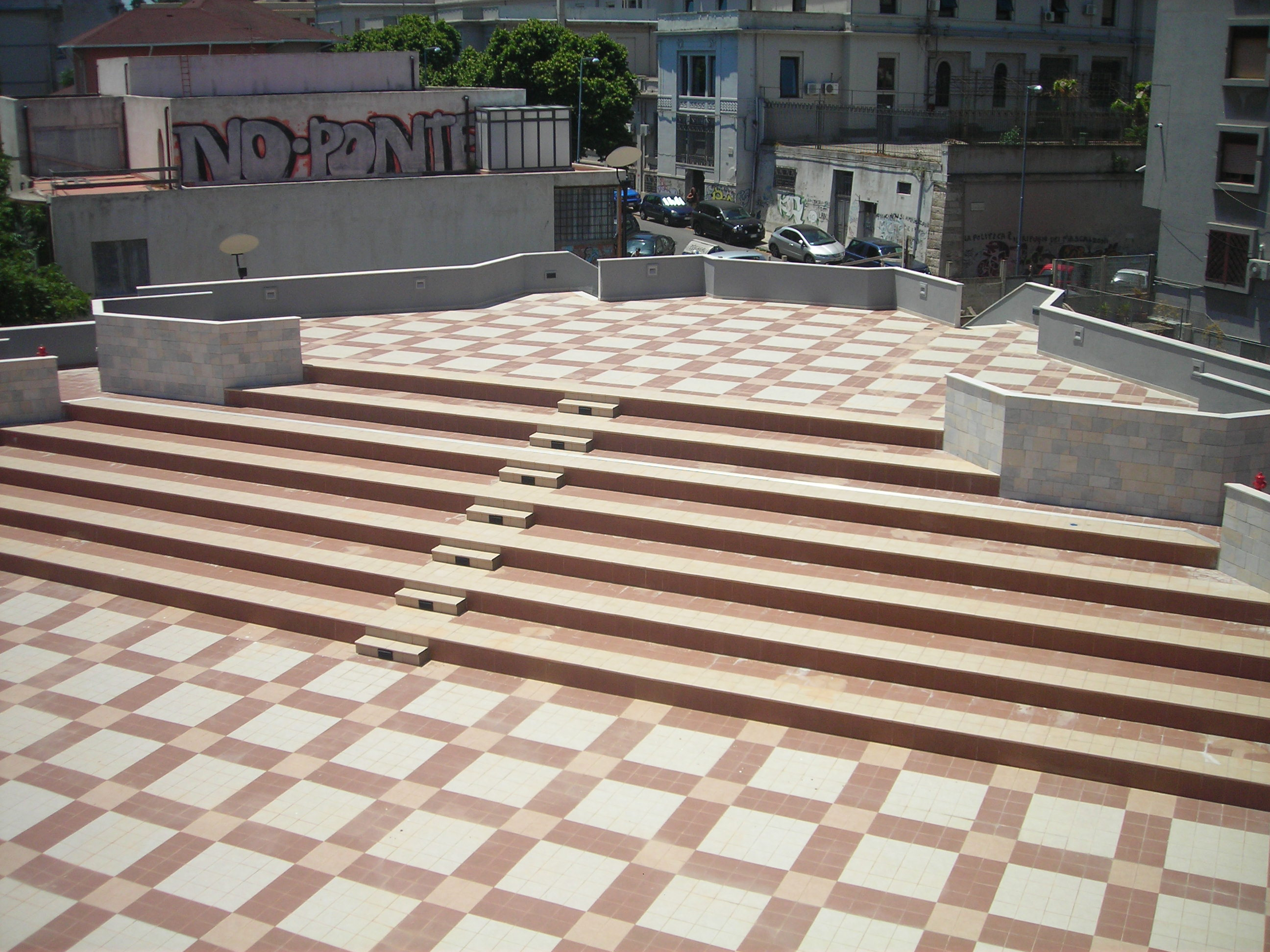
The stage on the terrace

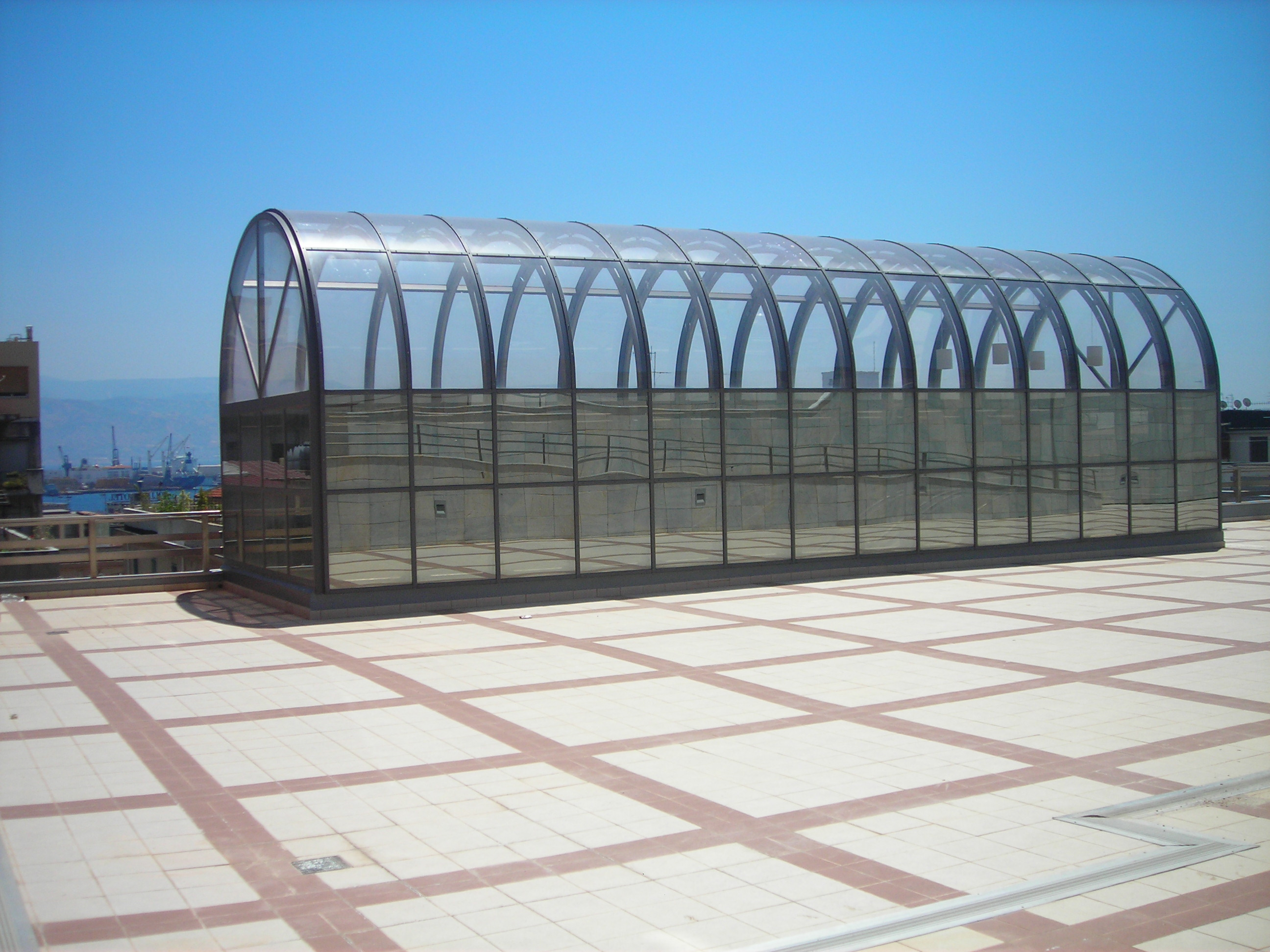
The escalators

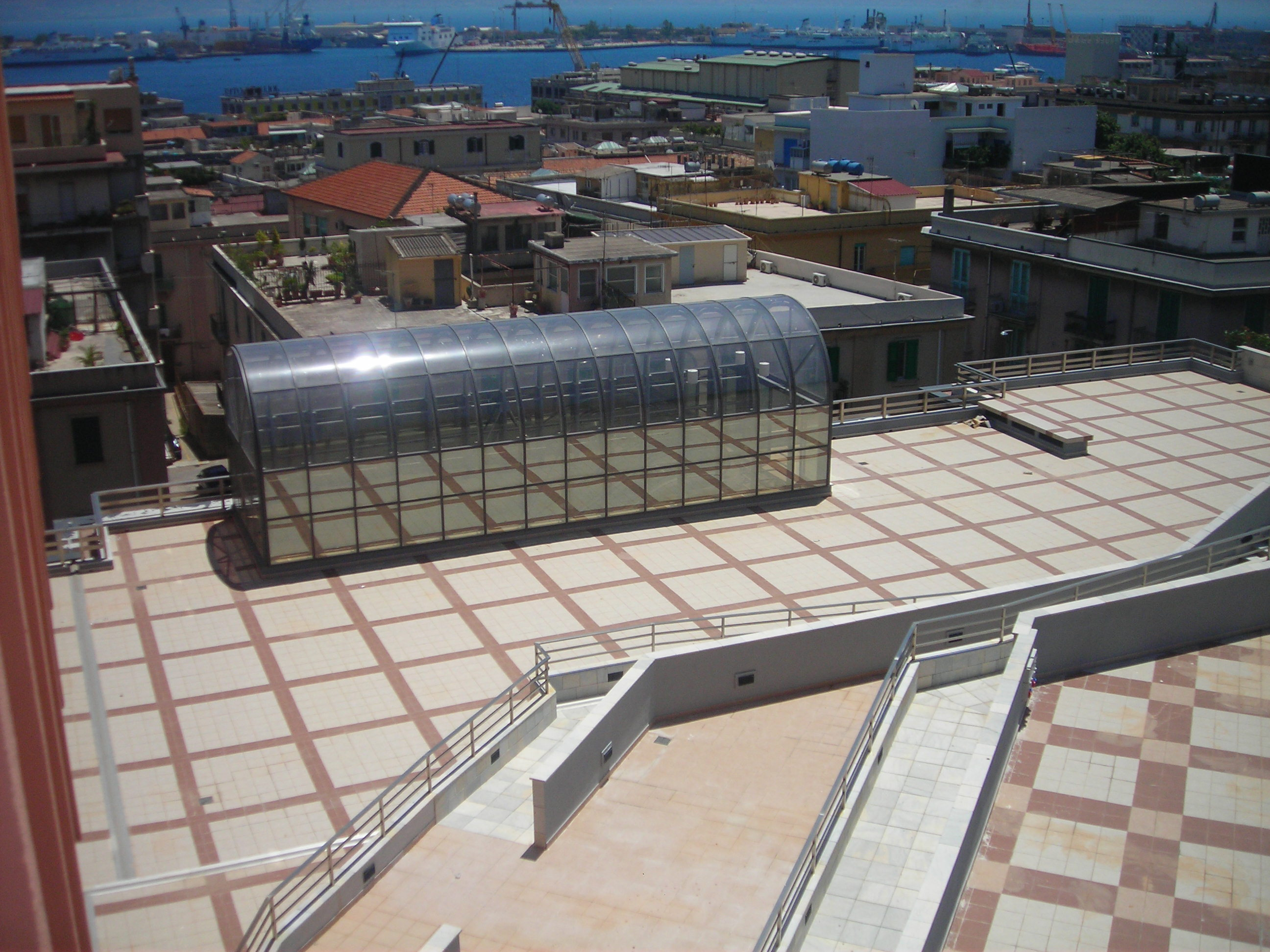
The Strait of Messina in the background

== See also ==
- Messina
- Antonello da Messina
- Palace of Culture (disambiguation)
