= Palazzo Vermexio =

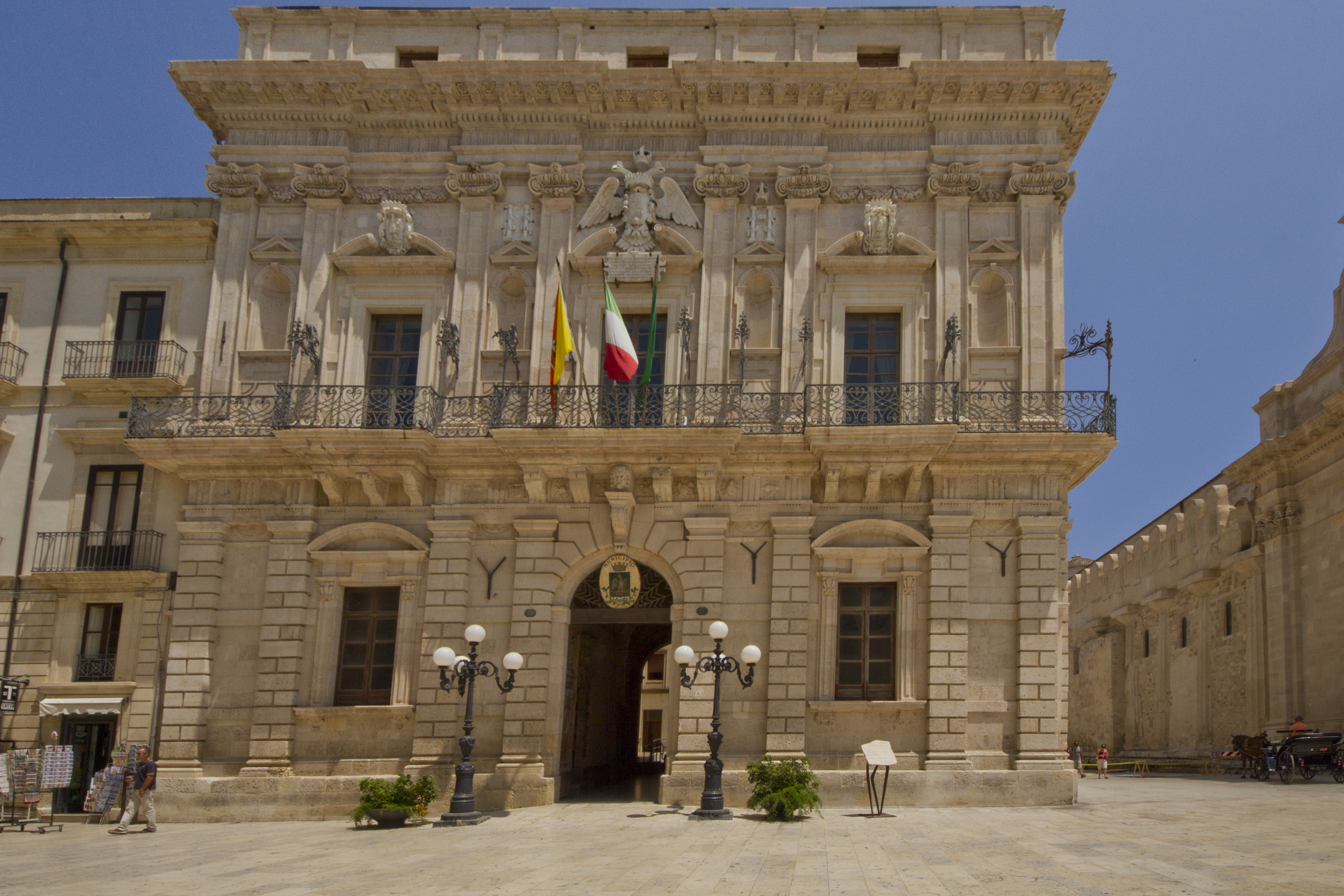
- Façade of Palazzo Vermexio
- Interactive map of the Palazzo Vermexio area

General information
- Type: Palace
- Architectural style: Baroque
- Location: Piazza Duomo, Ortigia, Siracusa, Sicily, Italy
- Coordinates: 37°03′38″N 15°17′36″E

Design and construction
- Architect: Giuseppe Vermexio

The Palazzo Vermexio, also known as the Palazzo del Senato, is a 17th-century Baroque monumental building located on the island of Ortigia in Siracusa, Sicily, Italy. Facing Piazza Duomo, the building currently serves as the city hall.

== Description ==
The palace was built between 1629 and 1633, with design by Giovanni Vermexio. The architect's stone signature, a lizard, is present in the left superior cornice. The palace was commissioned by the local Senate to replace its old home, located on Via del Consiglio Reginale. The urban palace has typical Sicilian features such as an iron balcony. The façade is also decorated with whimsical decorations of shells and masks. The niches were meant to hold statues of the Kings of Spain, commissioned from Gregorio Tedeschi. The sculptor only completed the coat of arms of the Spanish monarchy above the portal. A third story was added only in the 19th century.

The building now partly serves as a museum hosting in a hall of mirrors the Carrozza del Senato (Carriage of the Senate from 1763) as well as some ancient artifacts found at the site in the 1960s, including elements of a 6th-century Ionic temple, the Artemision previously found at the site.
