= Bombing of Cagliari in World War II =

Bombing of Cagliari
- Part of World War II
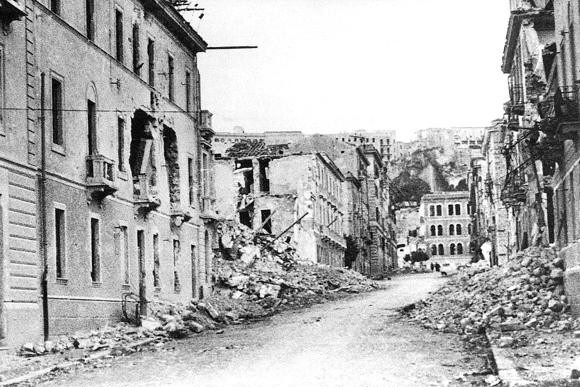
- A bomb-damaged street in Cagliari
Date	June 1940-July 1943
Location	Cagliari, Italy

Belligerents
United States; United Kingdom	Kingdom of Italy

The bombing of Cagliari was a series of attacks by the United States Army Air Force and the Royal Air Force on the Italian city of Cagliari, the regional capital of Sardinia, during World War II. The raids, aimed at destroying the port facilities and airfields of Cagliari, also resulted in the destruction of most of the city.

== History ==
=== Background ===
Cagliari, the main port and largest city in Sardinia, was a target of strategic importance as it was the location of some of the most important Axis air bases in the island (Elmas and Decimomannu), which enabled the Regia Aeronautica and the Luftwaffe to operate in the Western Mediterranean, as well as a submarine base.

=== 1940-1942 ===
In the first two years of war, Cagliari was repeatedly attacked by Fleet Air Arm aircraft, usually launched by British Force H aircraft carriers that sailed from Gibraltar for operations in the western Mediterranean. Such attacks, usually targeting either the port or the Elmas air base, took place on 16, 18 and 24 June 1940, 3 August 1940, 2 September 1940, 10 November 1940, 27 and 30 September 1941, 17 October 1941, 3 and 8 June 1942, 12 August 1942, 10 November 1942, 22 January 1943 and 2 February 1943. These attacks, carried out with small numbers of aircraft (never more than a dozen), caused little damage and few casualties.

=== 1943 ===
The situation changed in early 1943, when Cagliari came within range of the USAAF bombers operating from the newly conquered airfields in Algeria and later Tunisia. In order to interdict Axis air operations against Allied-controlled ports in French North Africa, the Sardinian airfields became a prime target for the Allied air forces; at the same time, the escalation of air raids on Sardinia was part of the Allied effort to mislead the Axis high commands into thinking that this island, rather than Sicily, would be the next target for Allied invasion.

On 7 February 1943, 51 Boeing B-17 Flying Fortress and Martin B-26 Marauder bombers dropped 81 tons of bombs on the Elmas airfield, destroying ten Axis aircraft on the ground and killing 31 servicemen. Some bombs fell on the suburbs of Cagliari, killing two civilians; four bombers were shot down by anti-aircraft fire and by Italian and German fighter planes, four of which (two Italian and two German) were downed in turn. In the following night, sixteen Vickers Wellington of the RAF also attacked the airfields.

On 17 February, 43 B-17s attacked the Elmas airfield with fragmentation bombs, but heavy cloud cover caused most of the bombs to miss the target and hit the city; while damage to buildings was relatively light, the fragmentation bombs killed some 200 civilians, in addition to 44 soldiers.

On 26 February, nineteen B-17 bombers dropped fifty tons of bombs over the port and the Elmas air base; many of the bombs also fell on the city, causing severe damage and casualties in the Bonaria, Castello, Stampace and Marina districts. At least 73 civilians were killed, but some estimates place the death toll at over 200.

Two days later, 47 B-17s dropped 123 tons of bombs on the harbour and the Elmas airfield, hitting the targets (one steamer was sunk and another damaged in the port), the railway station, and part of the city, especially the Stampace district. According to data of the Prefecture of Cagliari, the two raids on 26 and 28 January caused 600 deaths: 411 or 416 civilians and 189 servicemen. After these raids, damage was widespread in the city: on 4 March the prefect of Cagliari, Leone Leone, wrote in his report that "…there is not a single street left without destroyed homes, and in many parts destruction is complete…"; most of the population left the city, and those who remained spent most of their time in air raid shelters. State offices were also relocated to Sassari, Oristano and other towns.

On 31 March 1943, 27 B-17s of the 12th USAAF attacked the harbour, dropping 65 tons of bombs. The target was hit, sinking two steamers at their moorings, but many bombs also fell on the city, killing sixty civilians and wounding 52. Three bombers were shot down and four damaged by Italian fighter planes, three of which were shot down in return.

On 14 April, the Elmas airfield was bombed by 23 aircraft of the 12th USAAF. On 13 May, Cagliari suffered the heaviest raid of the war: 197 B-17 bombers, escorted by 186 fighters, dropped 404 tons of bombs over the city. Main objectives were the port and the marshalling yard, but according to some sources part of the bombers were also specifically tasked with attacking the city itself, in order to weaken the morale of the population. Indeed, this raid caused widespread damage to the entire city. At the same time, thousands of propaganda leaflets were dropped, denouncing the alliance between Italy and Germany and urging the population to pressure the government to make peace with the Allies. The submarine Mocenigo and a merchant ship were sunk in the harbour. The Italian and German air forces claimed seven B-17s shot down, and lost six fighters in return. On the following night, Vickers Wellington bombers of the Northwest African Strategic Air Force dropped a further fifty tons of bombs. The 13 May raid was the most destructive attack suffered by Cagliari, but civilian casualties were relatively low (estimates vary between thirty and sixty) as most of the population had already left the city.

After this raid, Cagliari had become a ruined, deserted city; by June 1943, less than 10,000 of Cagliari's pre-war population of 100,000 were still living in the city. On 16 May 1943 capitano di fregata Francesco Murzi, commander of the 7th Submarine Group, reported that "…the city is almost completely destroyed. Only a few homes in the suburbs are still standing (…) All public services are interrupted. The supply of electricity will become possible in fifteen days, but only in certain areas of military importance. The problem of water supply is very serious, as (…) all the main pipes have been destroyed (…) The city is almost completely deserted". Further raids were carried out on 31 June (by twenty RAF bombers), 2 July (by twenty British bombers), 3 July (by the RAF), 4 July (by B-17 bombers of the USAAF) and 20 July (by the RAF), usually targeting the port and the marshalling yard. These attacks, however, were not as heavy as the previous ones, as by this time the Allied air forces in the Mediterranean were focused on the invasion of Sicily.

== Aftermath ==
By the late summer of 1943, only one-fifth of the city had not been damaged; out of 4,500 buildings, 720 had been completely destroyed, 540 badly damaged, and 2,295 moderately or lightly damaged. Of the 945 buildings that did not suffer substantial bomb damage, 855 had lost doors and windows to bomb blast. According to the 1948 appendix of the Treccani Encyclopaedia, 75% of buildings were either destroyed or rendered uninhabitable. One thousand civilians had been killed by the air raids (in addition to at least 300 military personnel) and over 40,000 had been left homeless.

About 70% of the city's cultural heritage suffered damage; among the damaged landmarks were the Basilica of San Saturnino (Cagliari's most ancient church), several other churches, the municipal palace, the municipal theatre Bastion of Saint Remy.

On 17 September 1943, nine days after the Armistice of Cassibile, Allied troops landed in Cagliari. The Armistice marked the end of the air raids over Sardinia, and over the course of 1944 most of the inhabitants returned to the city; Cagliari was gradually rebuilt during the following years.
