= Basilica of San Saturnino =

Palaeo-Christian church in Sardinia, Italy

Coordinates: 39.213889°N 9.123333°E

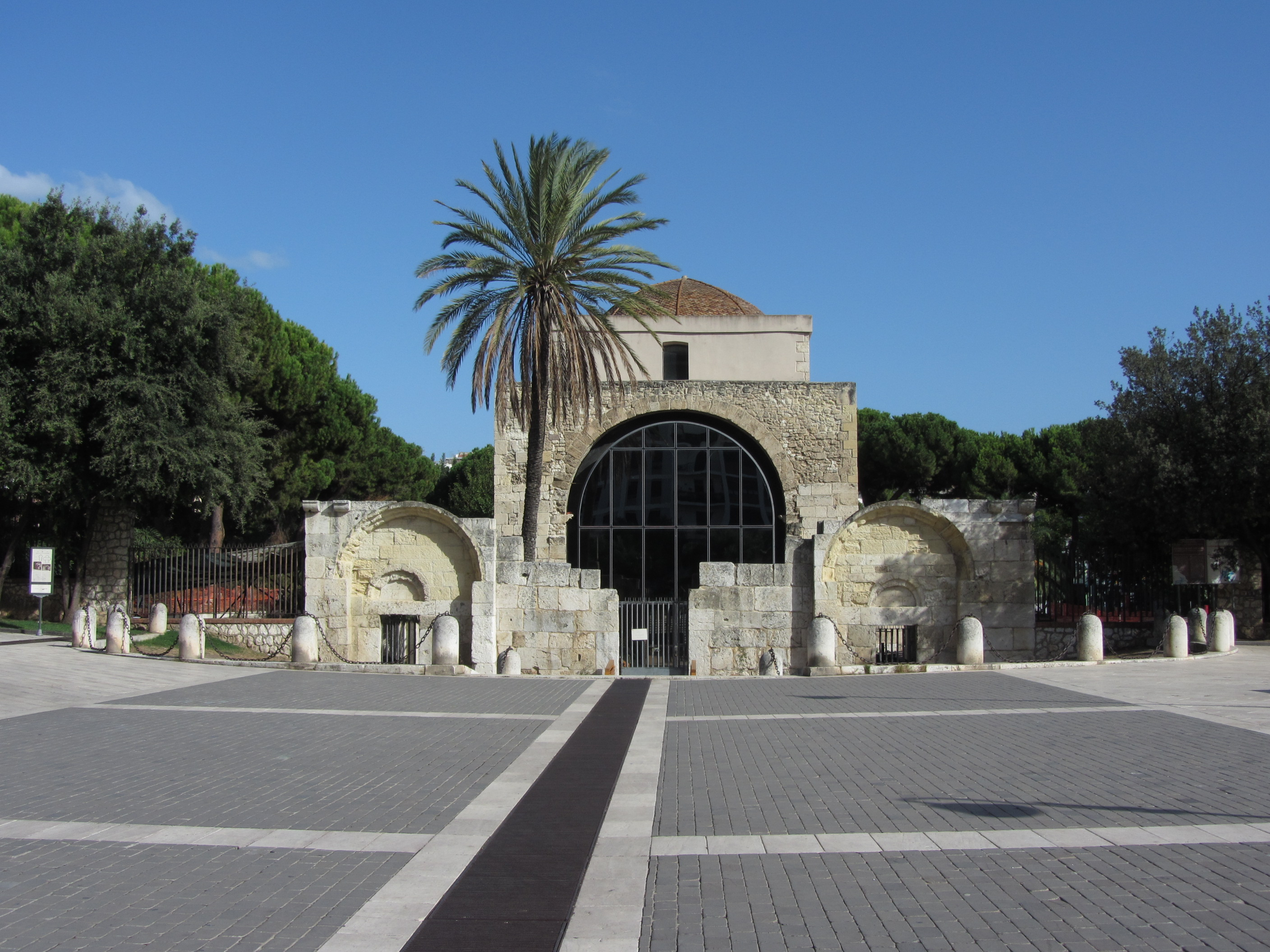
Basilica of San Saturnino

The Basilica of San Saturnino is a Palaeo-Christian church in Cagliari, southern Sardinia, Italy.

== History ==
The church is mentioned for the first time in the early 6th century. This church had been likely erected near the burial place of St. Saturninus of Cagliari, who, according to the Passio sancti Saturni (a medieval document telling the saint's story), had been martyred in 304.

In 1089 the giudice of Cagliari, Constantine II of Cagliari, donated the complex, including also a monastery, to the Benedictines of the Abbey of St. Victor of Marseille. In the occasion the church was restored in Provençal-Romanesque style. The renewed basilica was consecrated in 1119.

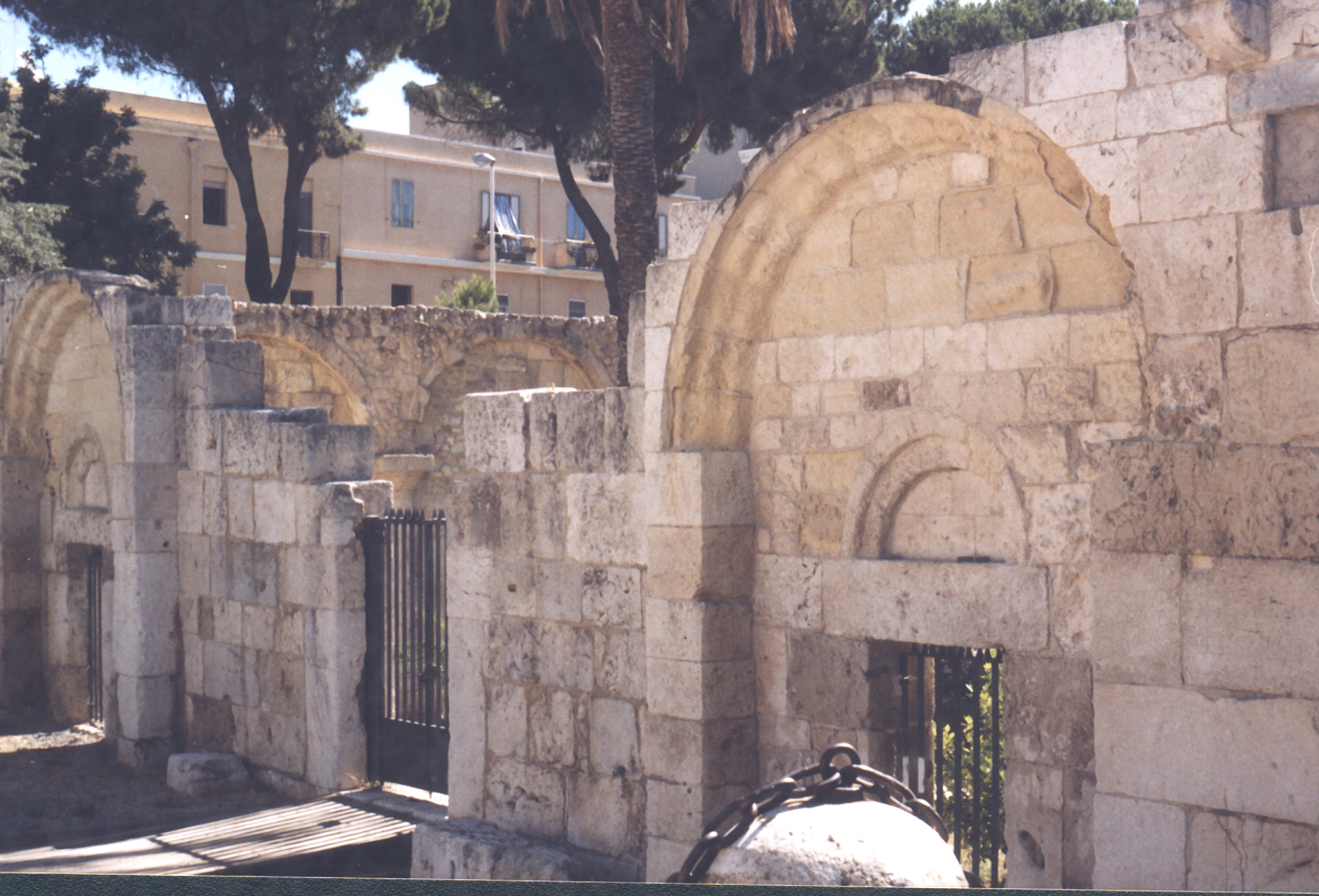
Remains of the western arm

In 1324, during the siege of the quarter of Castello (held by the Pisans) by the Aragonese, the monastery was damaged. In 1363 King Peter IV of Aragon gave the site to the Knights of Sant Jordi d'Alfama. In the following centuries the complex decayed. In 1614 the area was excavated in search of the relics of Cagliari's early martyrs, later brought in the city's Cathedral. In 1669 some material from San Saturnino were re-used for the Baroque renovation of the latter church.

In 1714 the church was re-dedicated to Sts. Cosmas and Damian. In 1943 the church was damaged by Allied bombings. After World War II it was restored. In 1978–1996 the church remained closed for restorations. It was reconsecrated in 2004.

== Description ==
The church is located within a walled area including a Palaeo-Christian necropolis, which is still being excavated. Today only part of the original basilica, which was on the Greek cross plan with a transept and a semi-spherical dome; all the four arms had a nave and two aisles. The current church consists of the dome-covered area (dating to the 5th–6th centuries) and the eastern arm, with a nave and two aisles, which ends with a semicircular apse.

The western façade, partly ruined, is divided into three sectors. The side ones have portals with architraves, surmounted by round lunettes. The current church's entrance is in the area of the former western arm, and features modern additions from the 20th century restoration.

The eastern arm is externally decorated with Lombard bands, while the apse has lost the original cover with limestone from Bonaria. The arm has a nave and two aisles, the former with barrel vault, the latter with cross vaults.

== Sources ==
- Coroneo, Roberto (1993). Architettura Romanica dalla metà del Mille al primo '300. Nuoro: Ilisso. ISBN 88-85098-24-X.
