= Insular Italy =

Insular Italy Italia insulare (Italian)
- Statistical region
- Country: Italy
- Regions: Sardinia; Sicily

Area
  - Total: 49,932.41 km^{2} (19,279.01 sq mi)

Population (2026)
  - Total: 6,329,684
  - Density: 126.7650/km^{2} (328.3199/sq mi)

Insular Italy (Italian: Italia insulare or just isole, lit. 'Islands') is one of the five official statistical regions of Italy used by the National Institute of Statistics (ISTAT), a first level NUTS region and a European Parliament constituency. Insular Italy encompasses two of the country's 20 regions:

- Sardinia
- Sicily

== Geography ==
Insular Italy occupies one sixth of the national territory in surface area. Territorially, both Sicily and Sardinia include several minor islands and archipelagoes that are administratively dependent on the mother islands.

Sicily is the largest island in the Mediterranean (25,708 km^{2}) and one of the largest of Europe, while Sardinia is only slightly less extensive (24,090 km^{2}). The lowlands are generally limited in the geographic region and generally appear as narrow coastal belts. The only exceptions are the Campidano and Nurra, in Sardinia, and the Plain of Catania, in Sicily, which extend 1,200 km^{2} (460 sq mi) and 430 km^{2} (170 sq mi), respectively. The rest of the area is prevalently hilly, with hills occupying 70% of the territory.

Sicily is home to Mount Etna, Italy's highest non-Alpine peak and Europe's largest active volcano. Sardinia is home to the Gennargentu mountain range.

=== Regions ===
Region	Capital	Population (2026)	Area (km²)	Density (inh./km²)
Sardinia	Cagliari	1,554,490	24,100.02	64.5
Sicily	Palermo	4,775,194	25,832.39	184.9

== Demographics ==
As of 2026, the population is 6,329,684, of which 49.0% are male, and 51.0% are female. Minors make up 14.8% of the population, and seniors make up 25.2%.

Historical population
Year	Pop.	±%
1861	3,017,528	—
1871	3,226,578	+6.9%
1881	3,613,604	+12.0%
1901	4,363,917	+20.8%
1911	4,679,936	+7.2%
1921	5,108,647	+9.2%
1931	4,889,727	−4.3%
1936	5,034,284	+3.0%
1951	5,762,772	+14.5%
1961	6,140,363	+6.6%
1971	6,154,515	+0.2%
1981	6,501,053	+5.6%
1991	6,614,634	+1.7%
2001	6,600,871	−0.2%
2011	6,642,266	+0.6%
2021	6,420,742	−3.3%
Source: ISTAT

The population is just over one-tenth of the Italian population and by far the lowest of all of the country's macro-regions. While it is the smallest macro-region in area, the region also has the lowest population density. This is because of the scarce population of Sardinia, one of the least densely populated parts of Italy at only around one-third of Italy's average population density. The islands are of roughly the same size but three quarters of the region's population lives in Sicily.

=== Largest cities ===
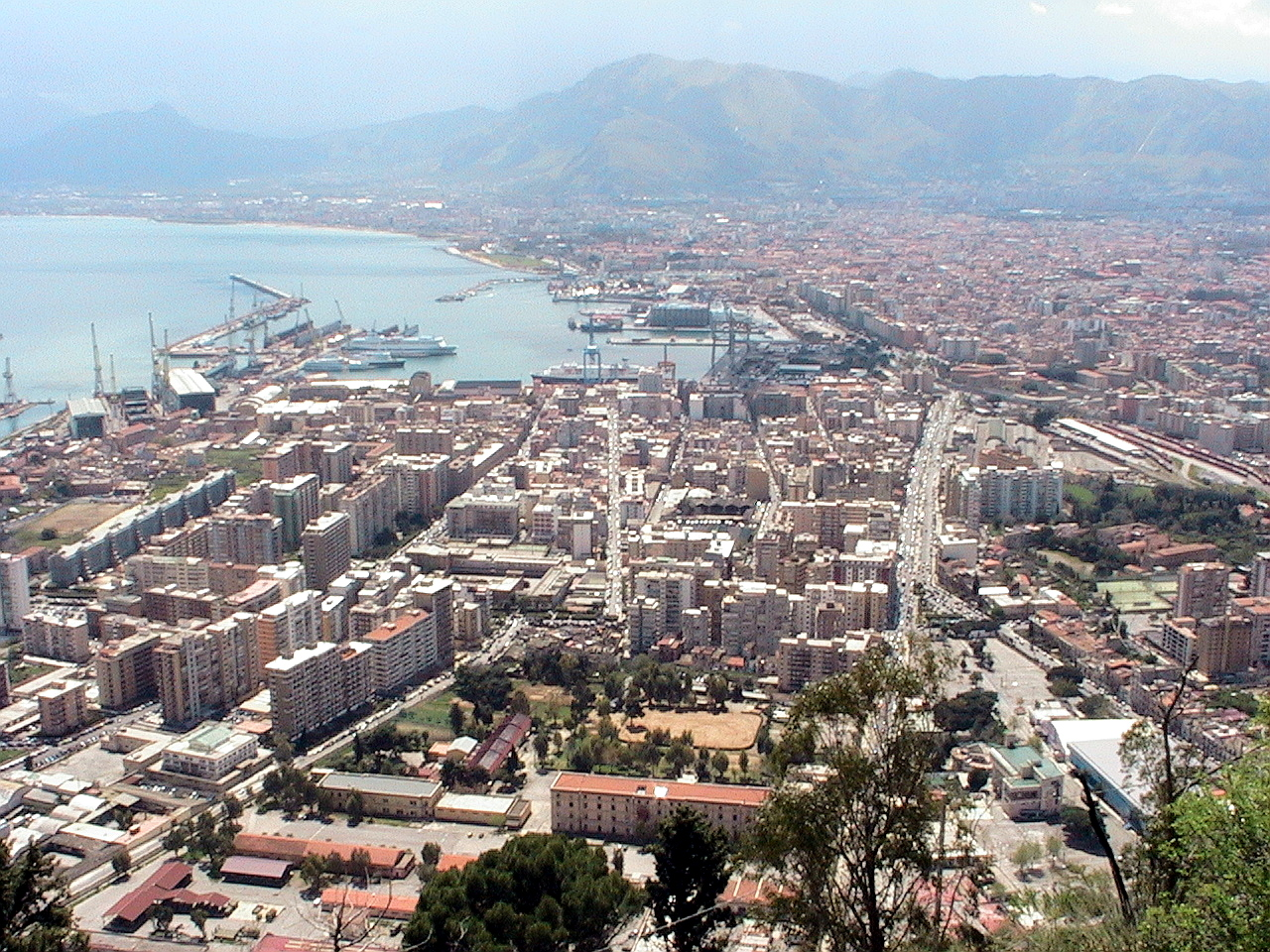
Palermo

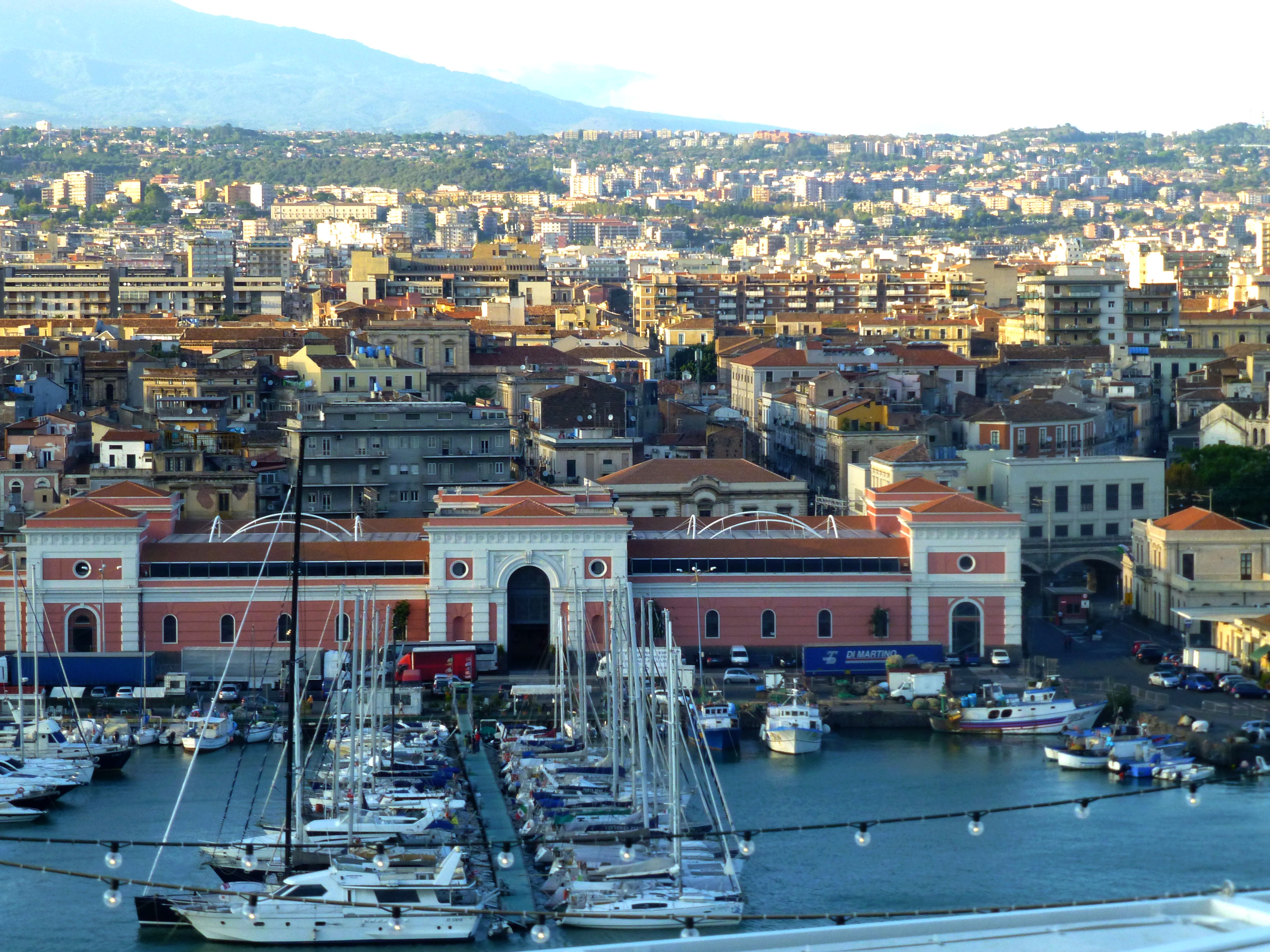
Catania

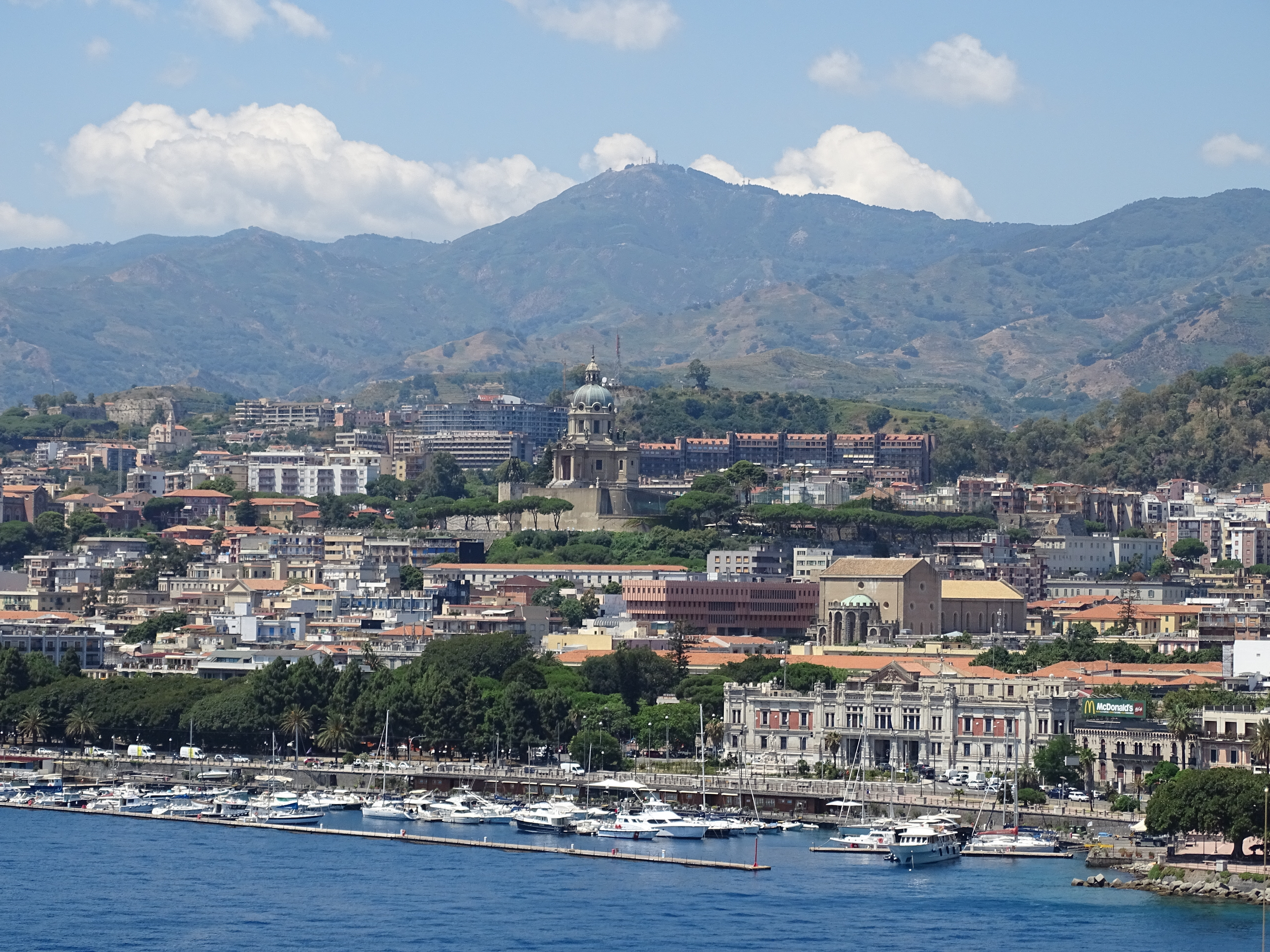
Messina

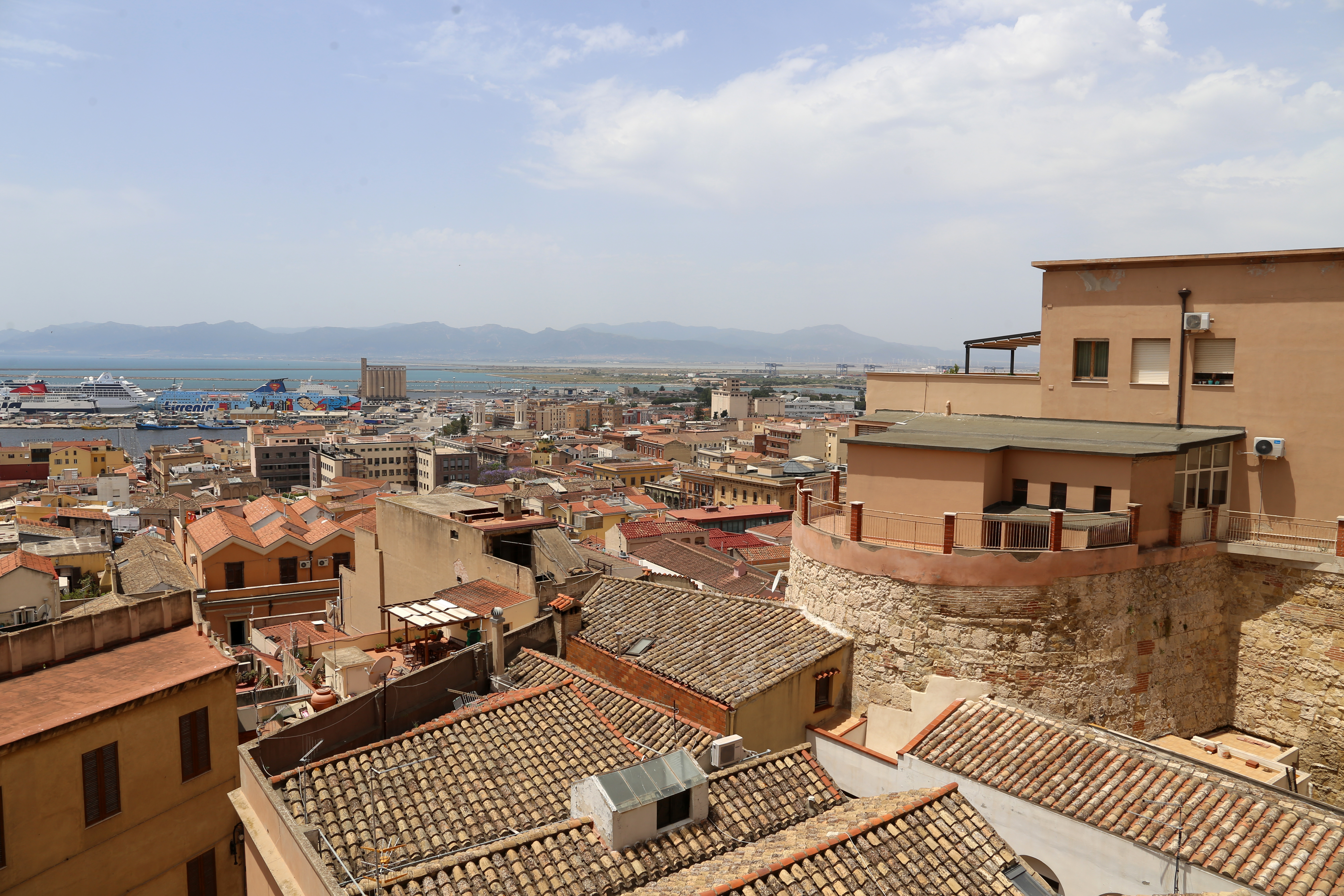
Cagliari

The most populous cities with more than 50,000 inhabitants are:

City	Region	Population (2026)
Palermo	Sicily	626,273
Catania	Sicily	296,984
Messina	Sicily	216,458
Cagliari	Sardinia	145,981
Sassari	Sardinia	120,231
Syracuse	Sicily	115,515
Marsala	Sicily	79,521
Ragusa	Sicily	74,122
Gela	Sicily	70,109
Quartu Sant'Elena	Sardinia	67,869
Vittoria	Sicily	66,329
Olbia	Sardinia	61,739
Caltanissetta	Sicily	57,922
Agrigento	Sicily	55,118
Trapani	Sicily	54,636
Modica	Sicily	53,622
Bagheria	Sicily	53,152
Acireale	Sicily	50,528
Mazara del Vallo	Sicily	50,070

=== Immigration ===
As of 2025, immigrants make up 6.1% of the population. The 5 largest foreign countries of birth are Romania, Germany, Tunisia, Morocco, and Switzerland.

== Economy ==
The gross domestic product (GDP) of the region was 123.9 billion euro in 2018, accounting for 7% of Italy's economic output. The GDP per capita adjusted for purchasing power was 18,500 euro or 62% of the EU27 average in the same year.

The unemployment rate of Sicily is the highest in the country at 11.9%, while in Sardinia between 2006-07 it dropped for the first time below 10%, reaching 8.6%, the lowest of all the Mezzogiorno regions, excluding Molise and Abruzzo.

The low level of entrepreneurship in Sicily is tied to the local organized criminal activity, and in Sardinia, it results from the rather expensive operating expenses (electricity, transportation etc.), which are 20-50% higher than other regions because of its peripheral location from the Italian mainland and the lack of a proper territorial continuity (continuità territoriale). That condition has been reduced in Sardinia with the development of information technologies like Tiscali, low-cost carriers like Ryanair and laws regarding fares and routes between the islands and mainland Italy.

== See also ==
- List of islands of Italy
- Italian Islands (European Parliament constituency)
- National Institute of Statistics (Italy)
- NUTS statistical regions of Italy
- Italian NUTS level 1 regions:
  - Northwest Italy
  - Northeast Italy
  - South Italy
- Northern Italy
- Central Italy
- Southern Italy
