= History of Cagliari =

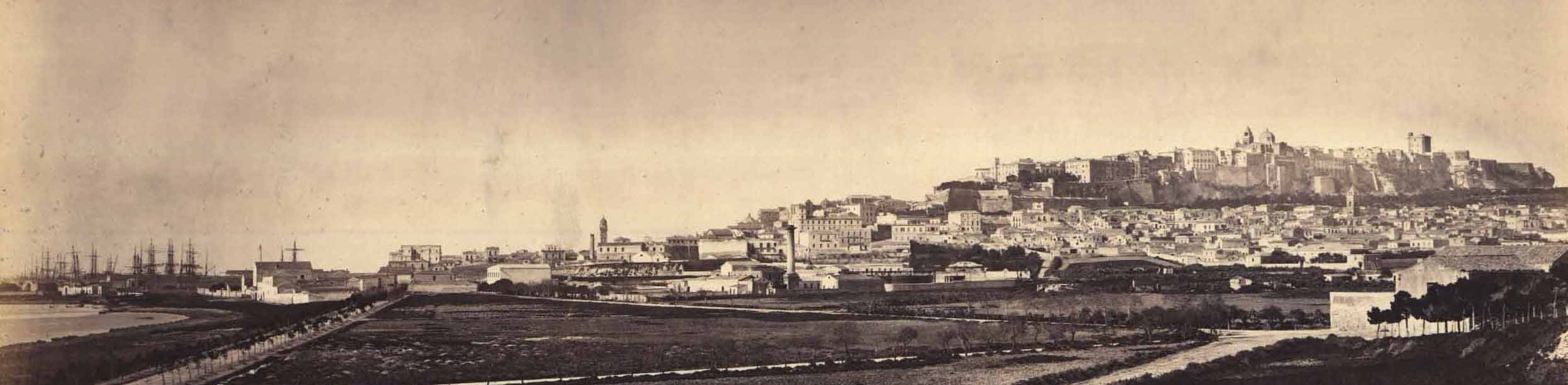
View of the city by east in the second half of the 19th century

View of the modern city

This article presents a history of Cagliari, an Italian municipality and the capital city of the island of Sardinia. The territory of the city has been continuously inhabited since at least the Neolithic period. Due to its strategic location in the Mediterranean and natural harbor, the city was prized and highly sought after by a number of Mediterranean empires and cultures.

== Etymology ==
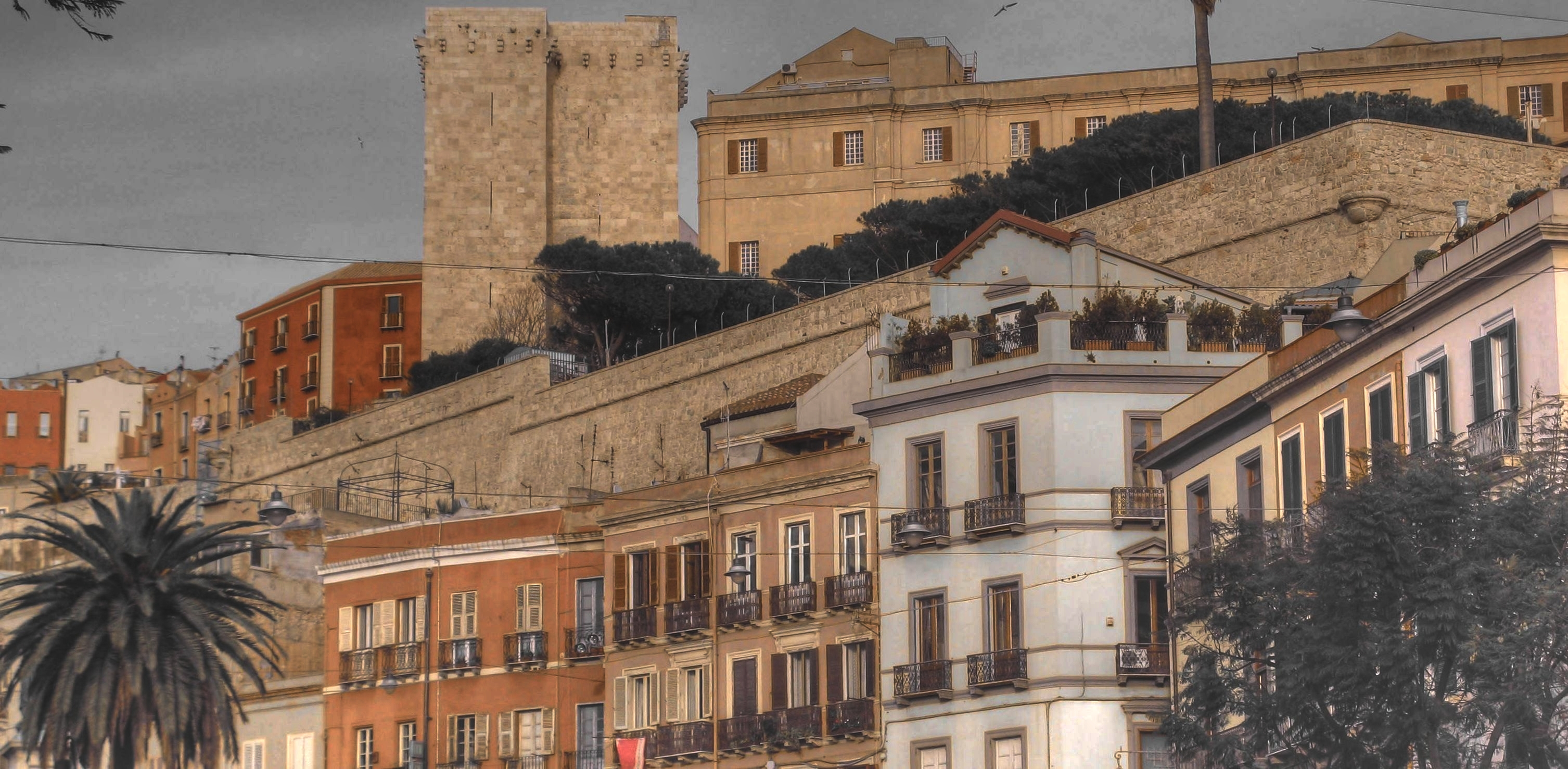
Cagliari, west walls and tower at dawn

Cagliari was known to the Phoenicians and Carthaginians as Karaly (Punic: 𐤊𐤓𐤋𐤉, krly). This was Latinized variously as Carales, Karales, Caralis, and Calares (grammatically plural). Around the 16th century Roderigo Hunno Baeza, a Sardinian humanist, stated that the name "Caralis" had derived from the Greek kárs (κάρα, "head"), as Cagliari was the main centre of the island. The Semitist William Gesenius said the name came from Kar Baalis, which in Phoenician meant "city of God." This version was, albeit with some differences, accepted by Giovanni Spano, who claimed that Cagliari derived from the Phoenician name Kar-El, which also means "city of God."

Max Leopold Wagner traced the term to Protosardinian Karalis, reflecting the Sardinian place names of Carale (Austis), Carallai (Sorradile), Karhalis or Karhallis (Carallia) of Pamphylia and Karhalleia of Pisidia (Turkey). The toponym Karalis was connected with such words as cacarallai, criallei, crielle, chirelle, ghirelle (wild chrysanthemum and Macerone) and garuleu, galureu, Galileu (pollen deposited in honey, which is yellow gold), which has affinity with the Etruscan garouleou (wild chrysanthemum).

Francesco Artizzu noticed that the root "kar" in the languages of the Mediterranean peoples meant "stone/rock" and the suffix "al/ar" gave collective value, so the word Karali could be translated as "place of the rock community" or simply "rocky place." As for the plural, Kalares, Artizzu explained that an initial settlement core was joined by other neighboring nuclei, thus increasing the extent of the city. In conclusion, Karalis/Caralis originally most likely had the meaning of "place of community on the rock/yellow or white rock".

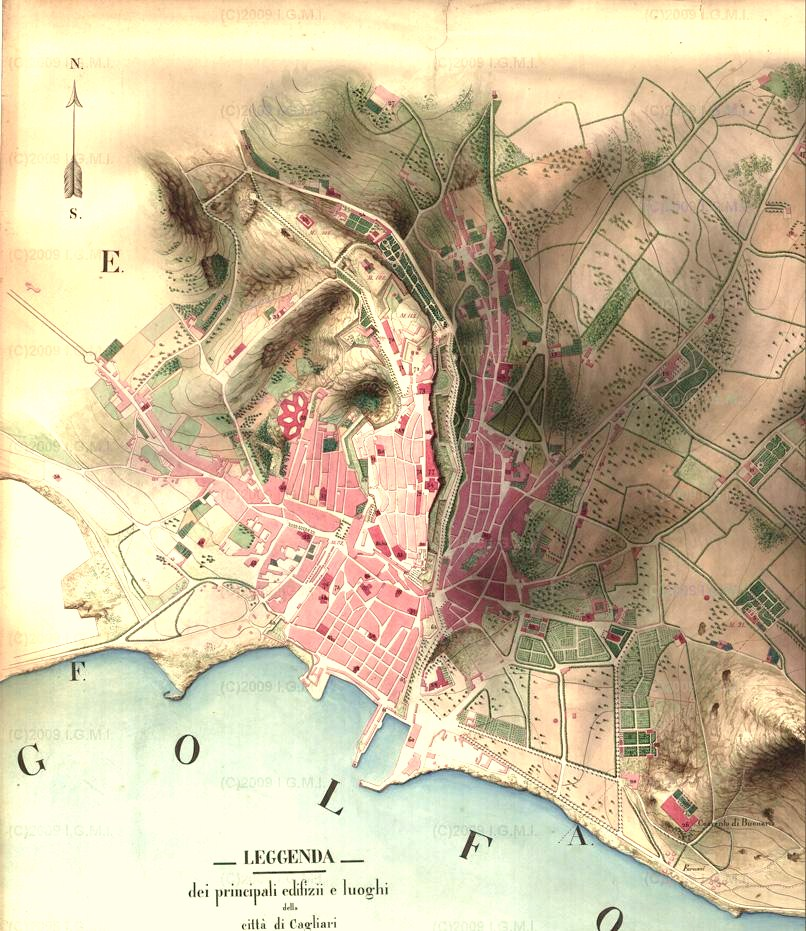
Cagliari map 1858

Over time the judicial city became the center of what is now the neighborhood of Santa Gilla or Stampace, and in medieval Sardinian was thus called Santa Igia (contraction of Saint Cecilia). With the arrival of Pisans the new citadel on the top of the hill was identified in the documents as Castellum Castri de Kallari and later by the Catalan-Aragonese as Castell de Caller in Catalan. Then on adoption of the Spanish language during Spanish rule the name became Callari and finally in the House of Savoy period the name was simply transliterated into Italian, obtaining the current Cagliari. In the Sardinian language the current name Casteddu identifies the city with the city's fortified castle built during the rule of Pisa. Other scholars think that the name Casteddu is much older, going back to the very beginnings of Roman rule, and is nothing but the translation into Latin of popular Karalis. The two place names survived, the one as the official name of the Municipium (municipality) until today, the other as a literal translation of the Latin which became prevalent in common parlance when pre-Latin languages became extinct in the city and throughout the whole island. An extant fragment by Varro Atacinus, a Latin poet of the 1st century BC mentions: munitus Vicus Caralis, meaning "fortified town of Caralis", Castellum in Vulgar Latin. In any case, the word Casteddu is the direct descendant of the Latin castellum and not a loan from the dialect of Pisa as might suggest the "refounding" of the fortified medieval city. Furthermore, at that time the hill of the castle was named Monti Castru; castru is a Sardinian word that descends from Latin Castrum (military encampment, fort or castle) and means "jagged mountaintop". A local Renaissance writer, Roderigo Hunno Baeza, describes the Roman city, from the ruins that still remained in his time, as an Arx on the hill, from which the Via Sacra descended to the port.

In conclusion, having no certain etymology for the name Cagliari, it probably refers to the naturally fortified hill overlooking the harbor, the main outlet of the southern Campidano plain. The Greek geographer Ptolemy, who lived in the second century A.D., wrote Κάραλις πόλις καὶ ἄκρα, literally "town and fortress of Caralis". The very reason for the existence of this ancient city lies in its being both a powerful military structure to defend the main port of southern Sardinia and a basis for control of the western Mediterranean, as well as the outlet for the grain-growing region and livestock products (cheese, leather), iron, lead, copper and zinc mining from the inland, and of course, the salt that was produced at the great saltworks that surround it.

== Prehistory ==
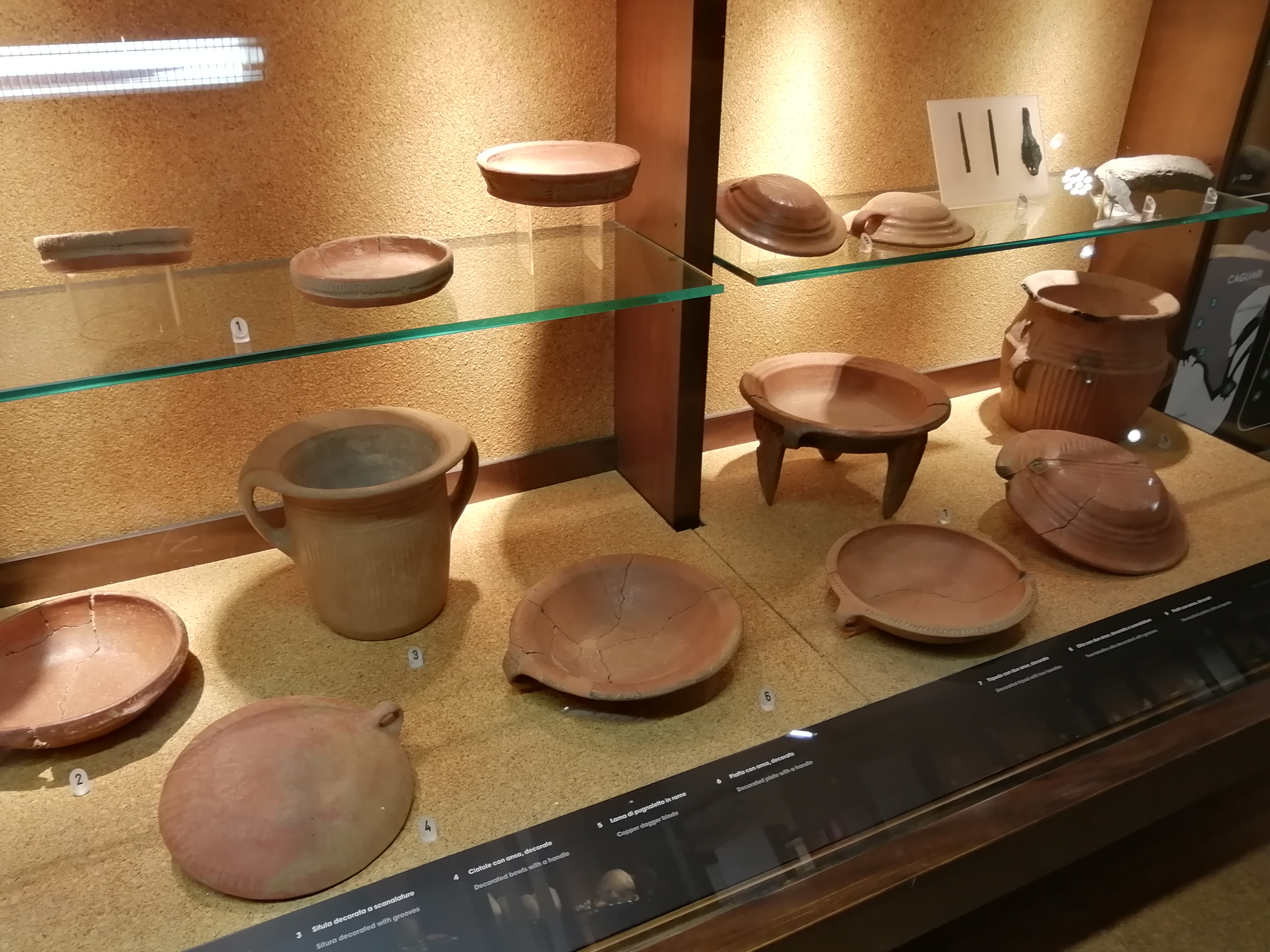
Monte Claro civilization cruise

Some Domus de janas and the remains of huts of the IV - III millennium B.C. discovered in Saint Bartholomew zone on the hill of St. Elias, confirm that the area where the city today stands has been inhabited since Neolithic times. The resources of the sea, ponds, and partly rocky land suitable for cereal and some horticultural crops ensured the livelihood of the people during the peaceful Pre-Nuragic period. Artefacts from the Monte Claro culture, named after the eponymous hill in Cagliari, date back to the Copper Age and spread throughout the island. Archaeological finds from the Bronze Age, such as Aegean pottery found in the nuraghe Antigori of Sarroch, inspired the hypothesis that the Nuragics settled in Cagliari, entertained intense commercial and cultural ties with the Mycenaeans, and are a testimony that their ports were already vital and busy. Inside the urban area no nuragic building was found until 2012, when in Monte Claro some ruins of a sacred well were discovered. All around the city, east and west, there are Nuraghes, Giants' graves and Holy wells.

== Phoenician colony and Punic era ==
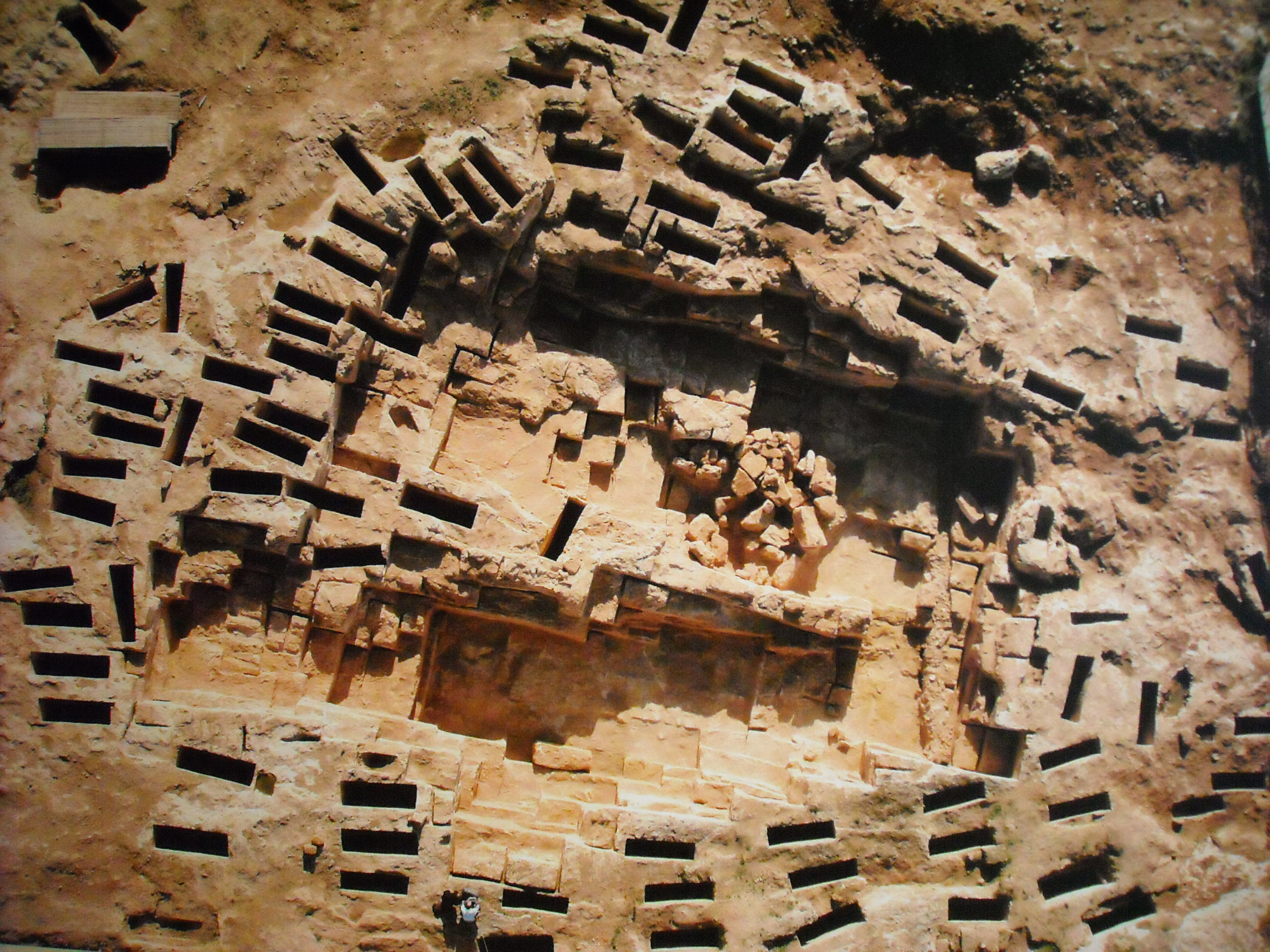
Necropolis of Tuvixeddu

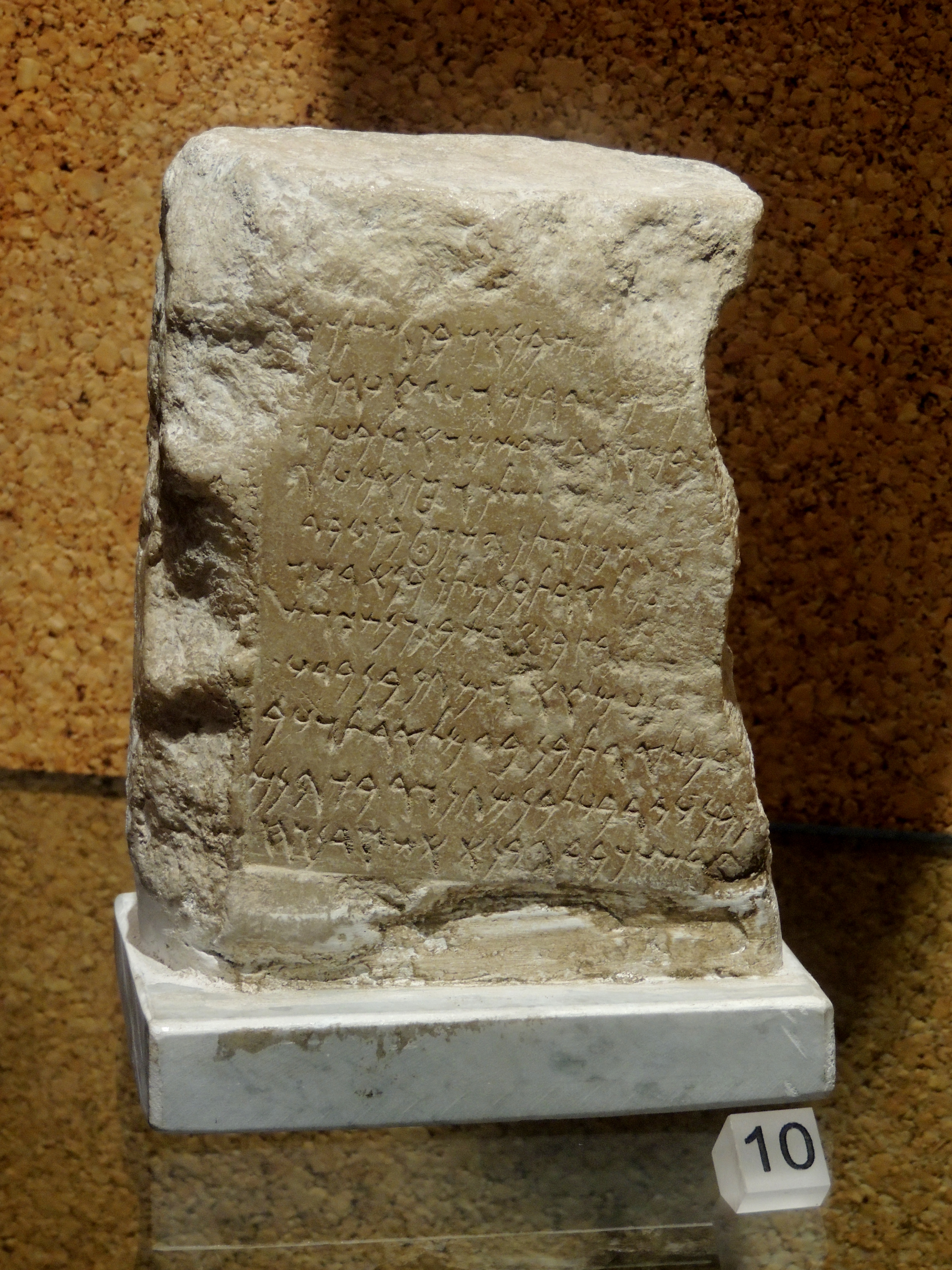
The Giardino Birocchi inscription, a Punic era inscription from the National Archeological Museum

Krly or Karel started as a store or trading post around the tenth century BC when the Phoenicians began to frequent the area of the Gulf of Cagliari. A passage in the De Bello Gildonico of Claudian, who described it in the fourth century AD, says that Cagliari was founded by powerful Tyre, a city of the Lebanon, which in the early centuries of the first millennium BC experienced its most prosperous period as a commercial power between the eastern and western Mediterranean, and also founded the city of Carthage. That was the thalassocracy of Tyre. The first nucleus of Phoenician Cagliari seems to have been near the pond of Santa Gilla, but gradually the city center moved more and more to the east until it reached approximately the point where today's Piazza del Carmine is located. During the Punic era, from the end of the 6th century B.C., the city took on the appearance of an authentic urban center and many temples were built, including one dedicated to the goddess Astarte, near the promontory of St. Elias. The town had two cemeteries, a northwestern one corresponding to the necropolis of Tuvixeddu, considered the largest Punic necropolis in the Mediterranean, and a southeastern one located on the hill of Bonaria, while the Tophet, the cremation necropolis where the urns of children were deposited, was in an area now called Campo Scipione-San Paolo.

== Roman era ==
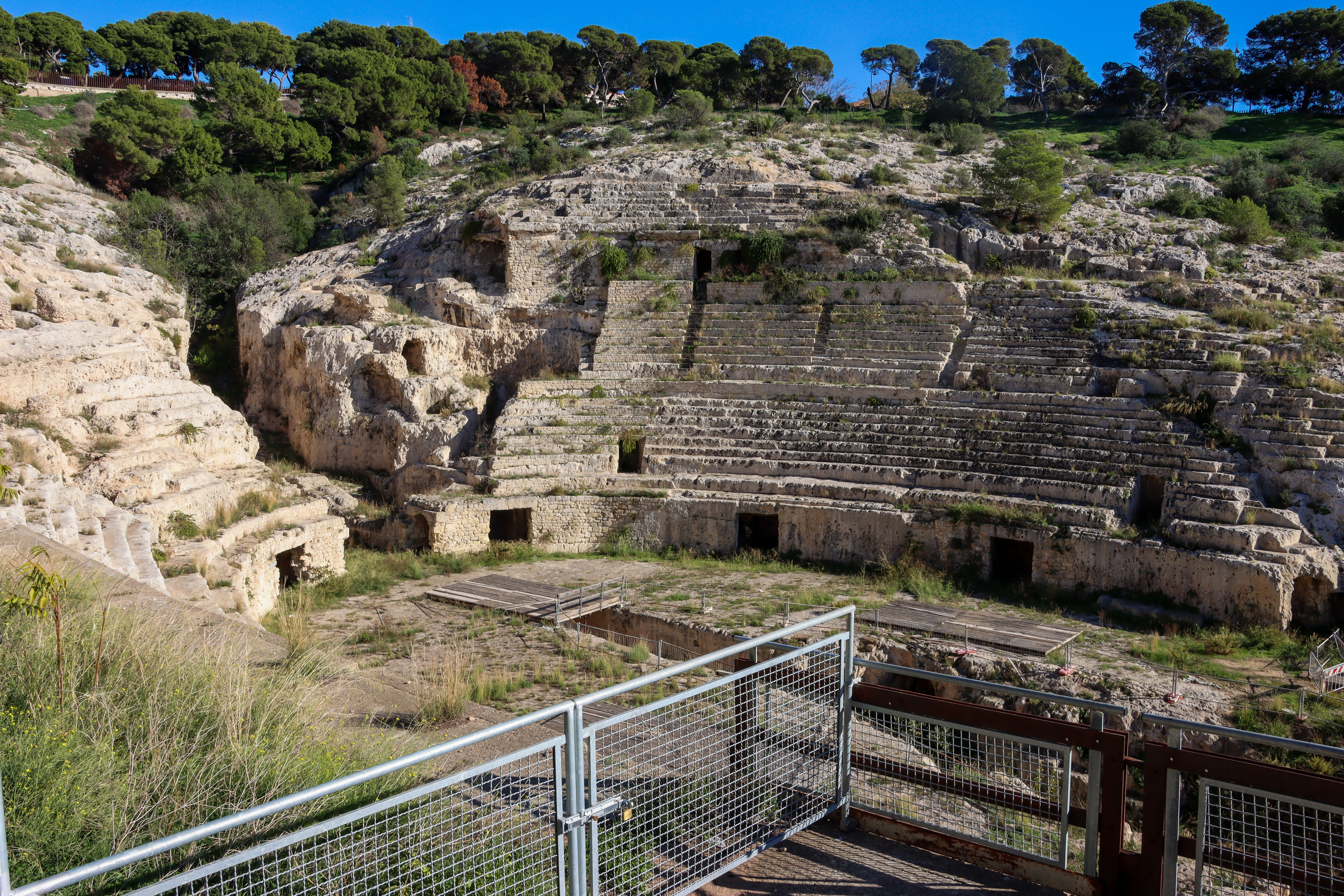
Is centu scalas, ("a hundred steps"), the Roman amphitheatre of Cagliari

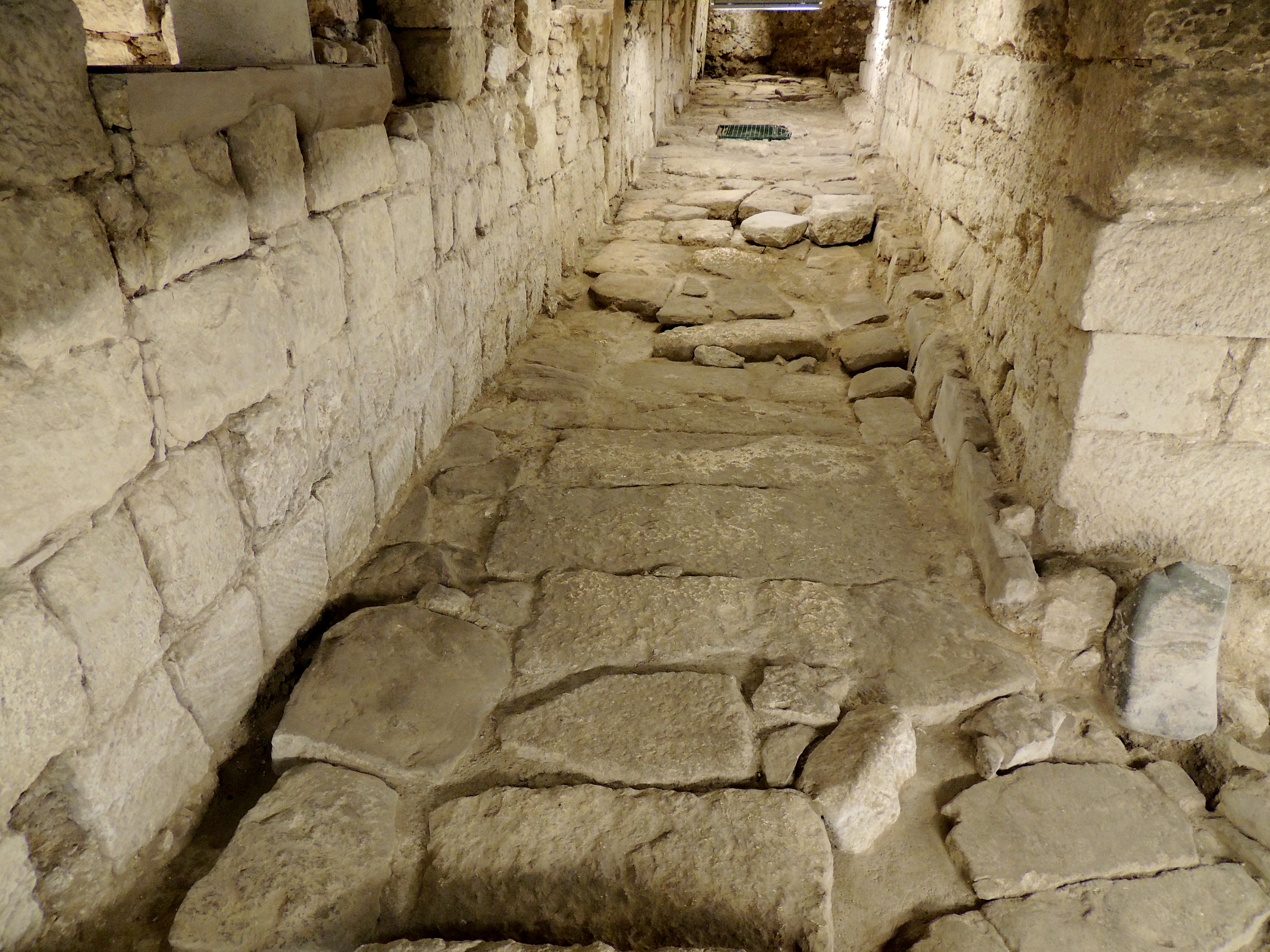
Roman era road in the substratum of Saint Eulalia church

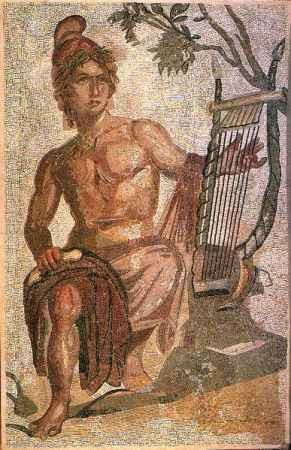
Roman Orpheus mosaic from Cagliari

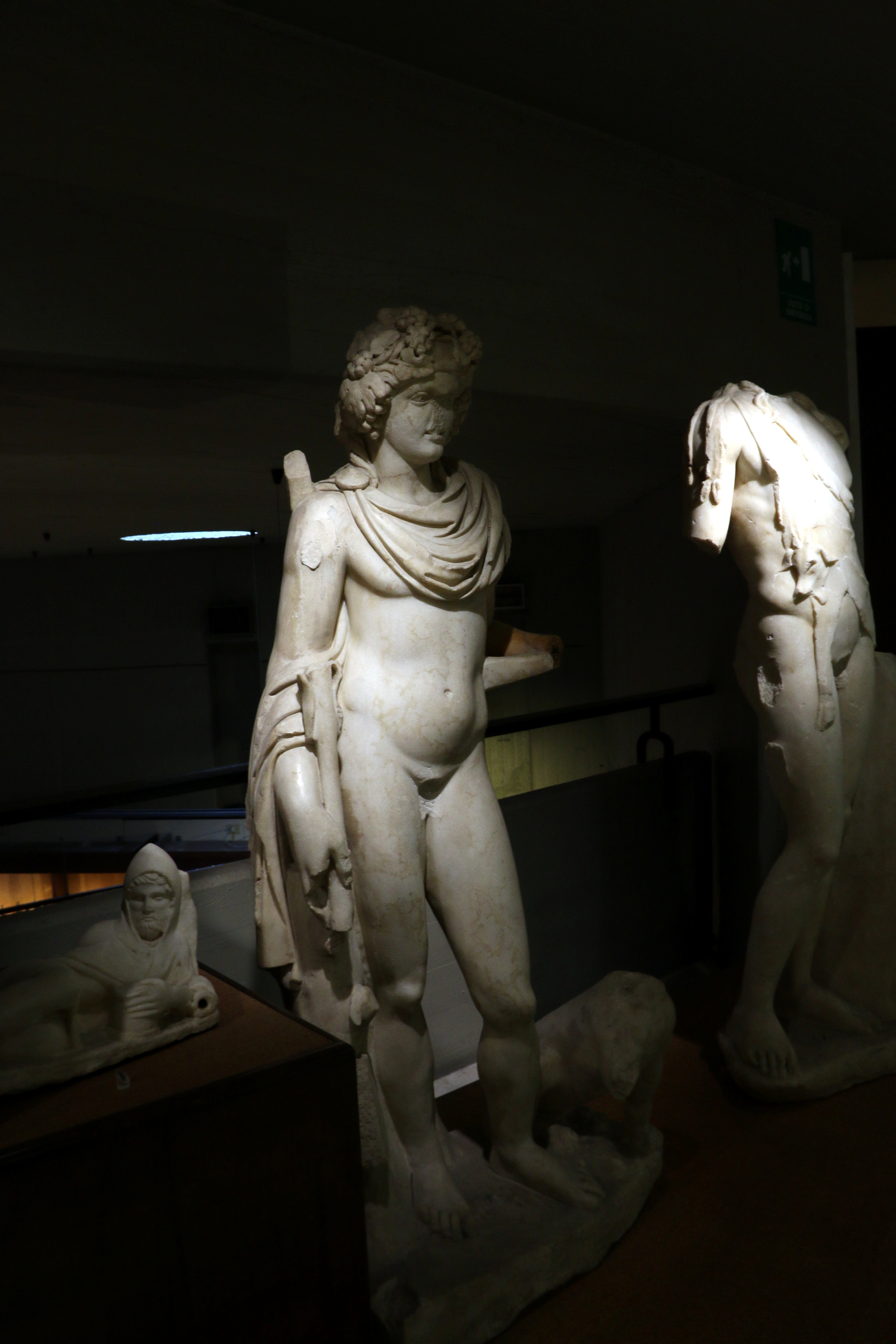
Bacchus statue from Caralis

Having become the island's now completely punicized main town, Krly became Roman in 238 BC when Sardinia and Corsica were occupied by the army of Tiberius Sempronius Gracchus in 238 BC, in the aftermath of the First Punic War. The appearance of the town does not seem to have changed much during the long first period of Roman domination. In the following centuries Roman Karalis retained its role as a Sardinian metropolis. On the death of Julius Caesar, citizens remained faithful to his name and sided with his adopted son Octavian Augustus, first against Sextus Pompey, then against Marcus Antonius. After the victory of Octavian there was a long period of political calm and economic boom.

Caralis (or Karales) was the capital of the Roman province of Sardinia and Corsica and was elevated to the rank of Municipium, a result of the civil war between Julius Caesar and Pompey when Caesar himself granted this status in gratitude to the city for its fidelity during the bloody war. All Caralitani obtained Roman citizenship and were enrolled in the tribe Quirina. The territory of the city included the Campidano plain up to modern Sanluri.

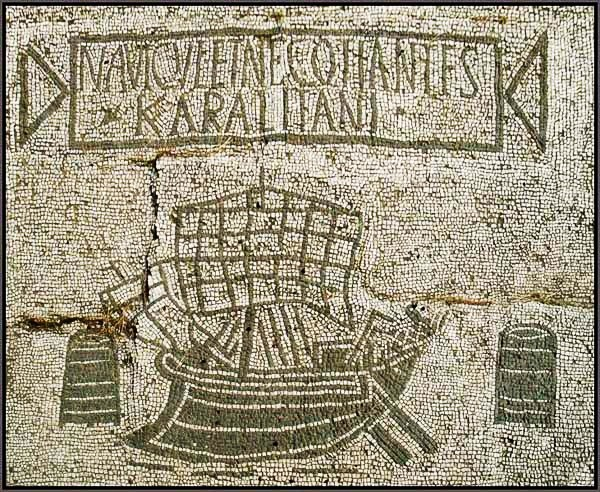
Karalitan ship owners and traders, on a mosaic found in Ostia (the port of ancient Rome)

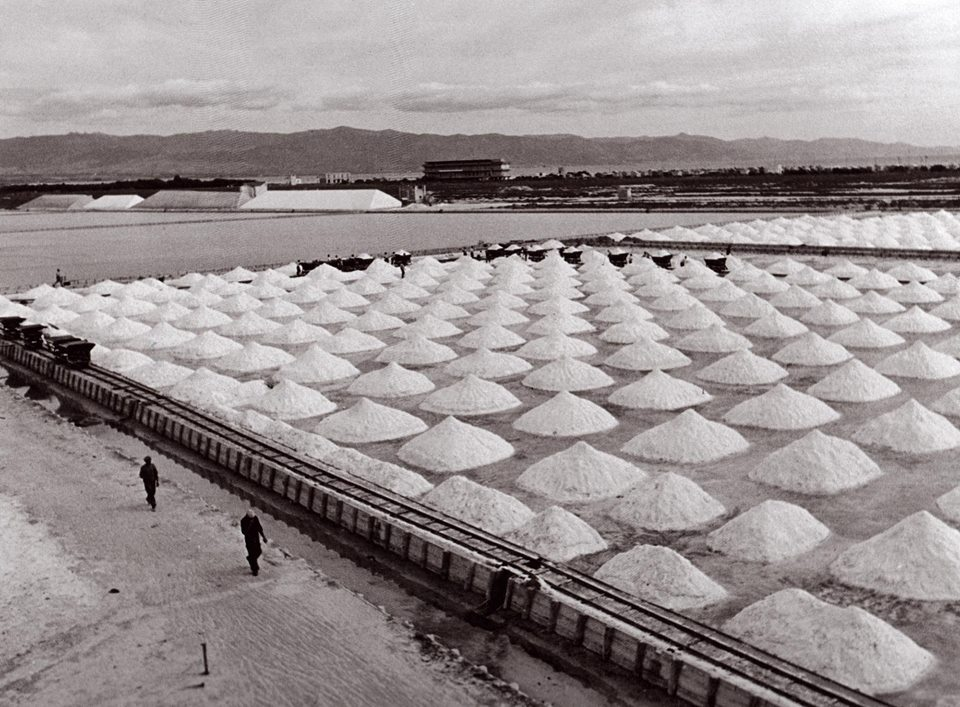
Salt pans, the oldest resource-exploiting industry of Cagliari

With about 30-20,000 inhabitants Caralis was the largest and most populous city of the island and one of the most important of the western Mediterranean Basin of the Roman Republic, and later of the Roman Empire. The city was equipped with important road links to the main towns of the island such as Sulci, with the coastal road and with that running through the valley of the Cixerri, Olbia and Tibula along the east coast, and Turris and Tibula along the road modeled on the current Carlo Felice, and finally a road through the centre of the island to the north coast. The town was also equipped with an amphitheater capable of seating approximately 10,000 spectators, temples, villas and aqueducts that supplied water, sourcing maybe from Domusnovas and Caput Aquas, near Siliqua. But the city was also endowed since the Punic time with numerous and large cisterns dug into the rock to collect rainwater and which can be seen today in various parts of the city. There were at least three cemeteries, one that was the same Punic necropolis of Tuvixeddu, another in the area around the churches of St. Lucifer and San Saturn, and Bonaria hill, and a third along the current Viale Regina Margherita, the burial site of the classiari or detachment of sailors of the fleet of Misenum, which was based at the city port. Along the main road out of the city to Turris, near the Punic necropolis, a mausoleum tomb dedicated to Attilia Pomptilla was built by her husband, Philip Cassio. Known as Viper's Cave, it is decorated with an impressive cycle of Greek and Latin carmina that can be considered the first literary work produced in Sardinia and surviving to the present day, the beginning of the literary history of the island.

Among the main economic activities, a primary industry was salt mining from brine at a site between Caralis and Quartu, still undertaken today. This salt as well as grain, leather (tanned in establishments found near the port) and other products made in Sardinia were exported to other provinces of the empire.

In the Roman period, although administered by the prefect of the province, the city maintained institutions of Carthaginian origin, such as the Sufetes, magistrates that were elected annually until the time of the granting of the "municipium" status. On that occasion, according to some researchers, a coin was minted with the names of the last two Sufetes of the city.

For the historian Florus, who lived between the first and second century AD, Caralis was already the city of cities of Sardinia in times of Punic Wars, and for the geographer Pomponius Mela, who lived in the first century, it was already a very old town. Claudian described the City of Caralis in the fourth century AD:

Caralis, extends in length and flows among the waves on a small hill that breaks the opposing wind. In the middle of the sea as a port and a large shelter, protected from all winds, calm down the lagoon waters

Claudian describes the ancient city as extending to a considerable length towards the promontory or headland, the projection of which sheltered its port; the latter affords good anchorage for large vessels. But besides this, which is only a well-sheltered roadstead, a large saltwater lake adjoins the city. This lagoon, called the Stagno di Cagliari, communicates with the bay by a narrow channel, and appears according to Claudian to have been used in ancient times as an inner harbor or basin. The promontory adjoining the city is evidently that noticed by Ptolemy (Κάραλις πόλις καὶ ἄκρα), but the Caralitanum Promontorium of Pliny can be no other than the headland, now called Capo Carbonara, which forms the eastern boundary of the Gulf of Cagliari and the southeast point of the whole island. Immediately off it lay the little island of Ficaria, now called the Isola dei Cavoli. A Christian community is attested in Cagliari at least as early as the 3rd century, and by the end of that century the city had a Christian bishop. In the middle decades of the 4th century bishop Lucifer of Cagliari was exiled because of his opposition to the Arian belief. He was banished to the desert of Thebais by the emperor Constantius.

== Vandal domination ==
In 456 the city fell under the occupation of the Vandals of Africa, led by Genseric. Caralis was part of the Kingdom of the Vandals for about eighty years, and became for a short time the capital of an independent Sardinian kingdom proclaimed by the Visigoth noble and Vandal governor of Sardinia, Godas.

== Byzantine era ==
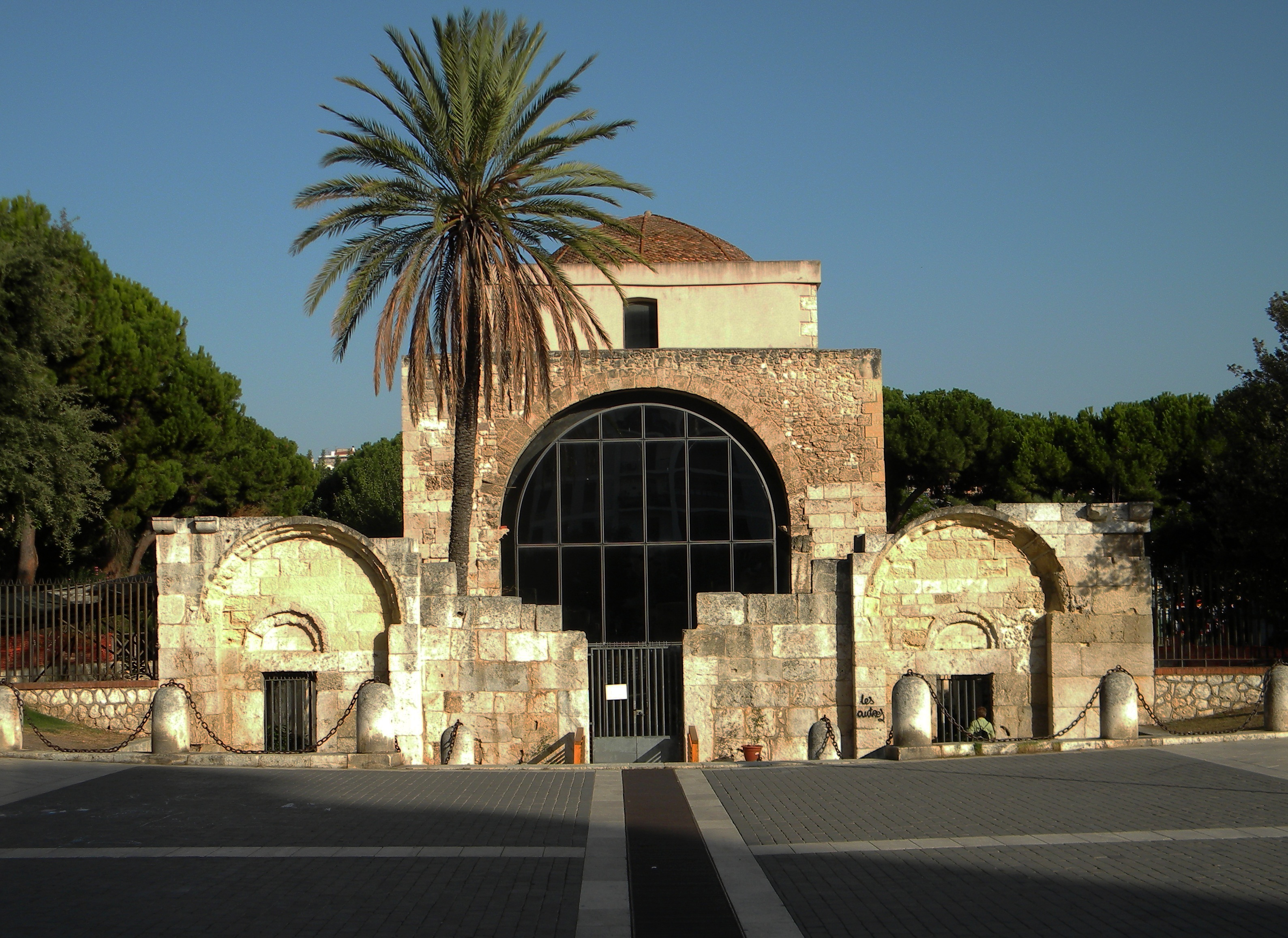
Saint Saturnus Basilica

Sardinia was conquered by the Romans of the East under Emperor Justinian I in 534 AD. An expedition led by Belisarius defeated the Vandals and Cagliari entered the Byzantine administrative system as the seat of the ἄρχων (archon), the provincial governor, an imperial official in charge of the whole of Sardinia (Σαρδηνία) and subject to the Exarchate of Africa. During the Gothic War, which raged in the peninsula, Goths occupied the city for a short time before it was given back into Byzantine hands. In 599 AD, the fleet of the Lombard King Agilulf raided and plundered the coasts of Cagliari, but was finally repulsed by local militias.

In the year 753 AD, Arab sources report the imposition of the jizya, a tax for those not converted to Islam, the dhimmi, on the Sardinians. This presumes the occupation of the land on which it is imposed, but the lack of further sources suggests ephemeral occupation and control confined to some coastal regions. On this occasion, however, the Arabs could have imposed the dismantling of the defenses of the city. When in 827 the Muslim conquest of Sicily began, contacts with Constantinople became extremely difficult. The few available sources suggest that the richest and most influential family of the island began to take over the local government. Although a vassal of the Byzantines, so that even at the beginning of the eleventh century its rulers still boasted the title of imperial protospatharios, Sardinia was in fact independent. Cagliari became the capital of this independent kingdom or giudicato, ruled by a judice (literally "judge" or magistrate). However, there is some evidence that during this period of independence from external rule the city was reduced to a small port community because it was too exposed to attacks from the sea by Moorish pirates. Apparently many people left Caralis and founded a new town (named Santa Igia) in an area close to the Santa Gilla swamp to the west of Cagliari, but relatively distant from the sea. At the present state of research, the site of historic Santa Gilla has not yet been identified, because it was completely destroyed by the Pisans in the thirteenth century. The walls were dismantled, as well as the cathedral and the palace of the judice.

After the failed attempt at conquest of Sardinia by the Spanish Muslim Mujāhid al-ʿĀmirī in about 1016, the kingdom was divided into four giudicati, one of which was named Calari, in reference to Caralis, now modern Cagliari. The Judicatus of Cagliari comprised a large area of the Campidano plain, the mineral resources of the Sulcis region, and the mountain region of Ogliastra. There were three other independent and autonomous giudicati in Sardinia: the Logudoro (or Torres) in the northwest, the Gallura in the northeast, and in the west the most famous, the long-lived Giudicato of Arborea, with Oristano as its capital.

== Judicatus of Cagliari ==
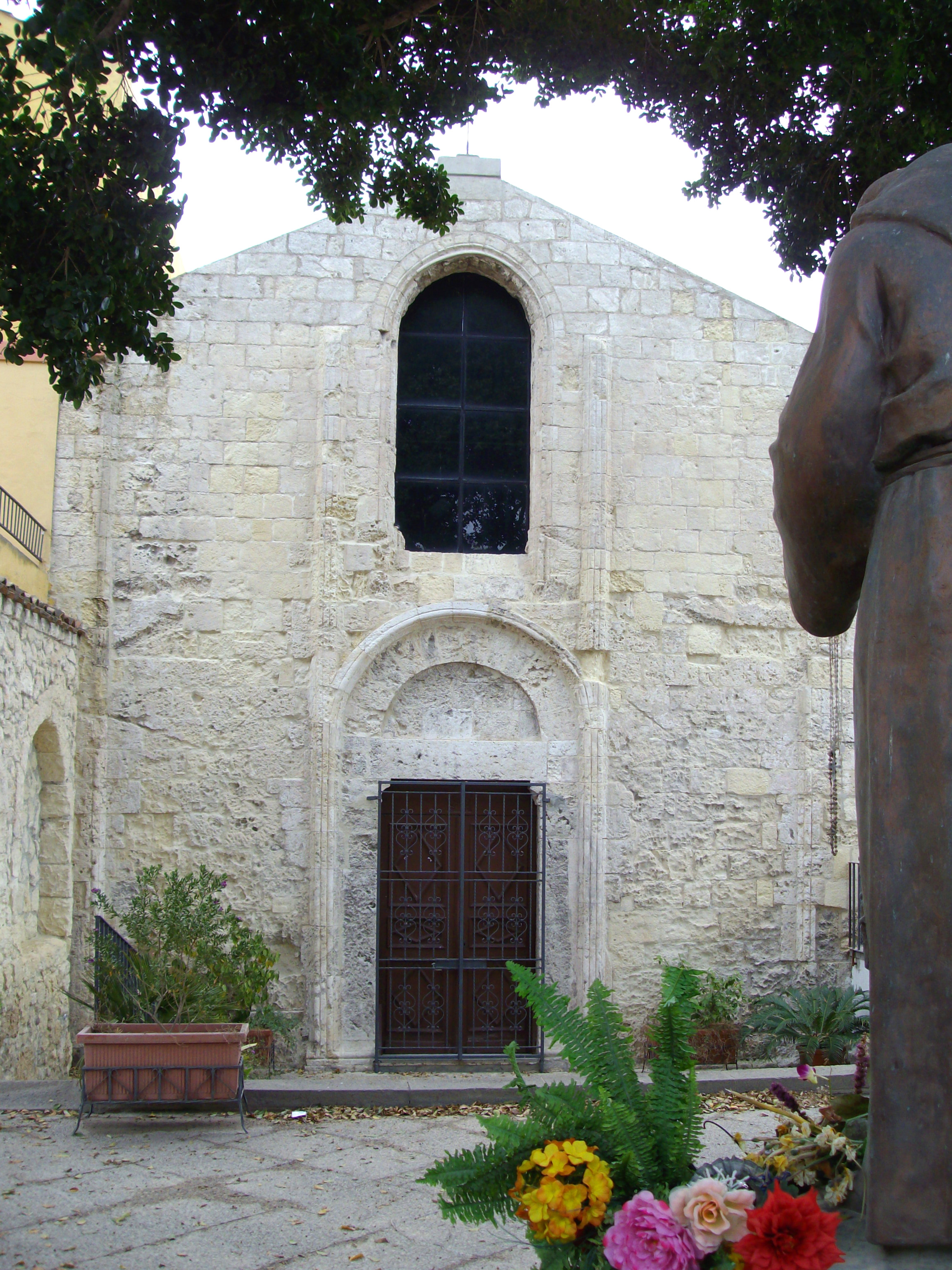
Saint Peter of Fishermen church of Santa Igia, today included in the city of Cagliari

Castle of San Michele

In 1089, Constantine Salusio de Lacon appeared with the title of rex et iudex Caralitanus ("King and Judge of Cagliari").

During the 11th century, the Republic of Pisa began to extend its political influence over the Giudicato of Cagliari. Pisa and the maritime republic of Genoa had a keen interest in Sardinia because it was a perfect strategic base for controlling the commercial routes between Italy and North Africa.

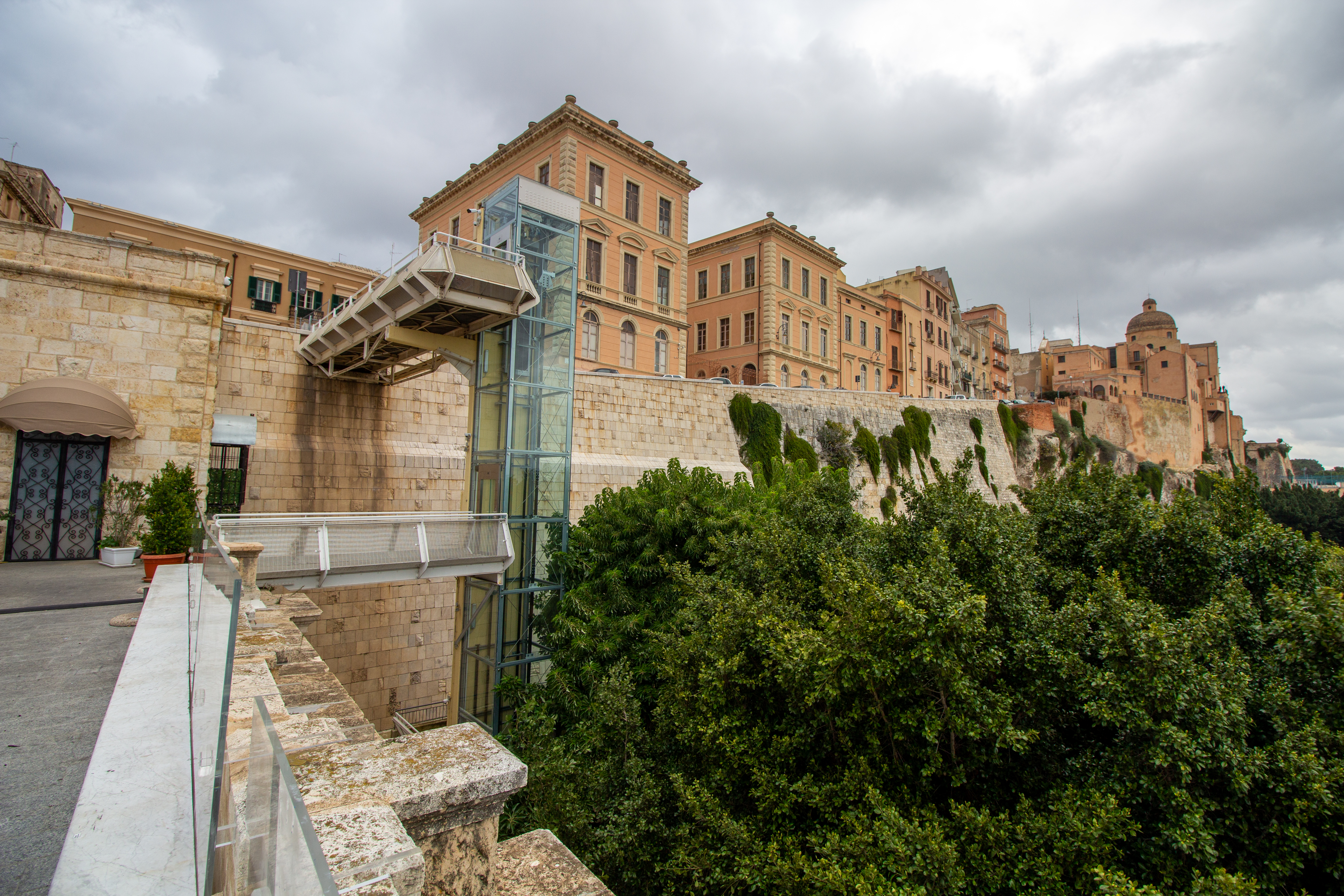
Castello

In 1215 the Pisan Lamberto Visconti, giudice of Gallura, obtained by force from the Torchitorio IV of Cagliari and his wife Benedetta the hill located east of Santa Igia. Soon (1216/1217) Pisan merchants founded on this mount a new fortified city to be known as "Castel di Castro", which can be considered the ancestor of the modern city of Cagliari. Some of the fortifications that still surround the current district of Castello (Casteddu 'e susu in the Sardinian language) were built by the Pisans, most notably the two remaining white limestone towers designed by the architect Giovanni Capula (originally there were three towers guarding the three gates that gave access to the district). Together with the district of Castello, Castel di Castro comprised the districts of Marina (which included the port) and the later Stampace and Villanova. Marina and Stampace were guarded by walls, while Villanova, which mainly hosted peasants, was not.

The location of the capital of the Judicatus, Santa Igia, is still unknown. A hypothesis identifies it in a place now called Fangario on the far outskirts of the modern city, but the most recent hypothesis locates it around the modern Corso Vittorio Emanuele, significantly referred to in the Sardinian language as "Su Brugu," the burg. The only building of the era that still exists is near the Corso: the church of Saint Peter Fisherman. All the other buildings, the palace, churches, houses and walls were demolished by the Pisans and their foundations are now below the modern city, as are the Punic, Roman and Byzantine ruins that appear here and there under the modern houses.

== Pisan domination ==
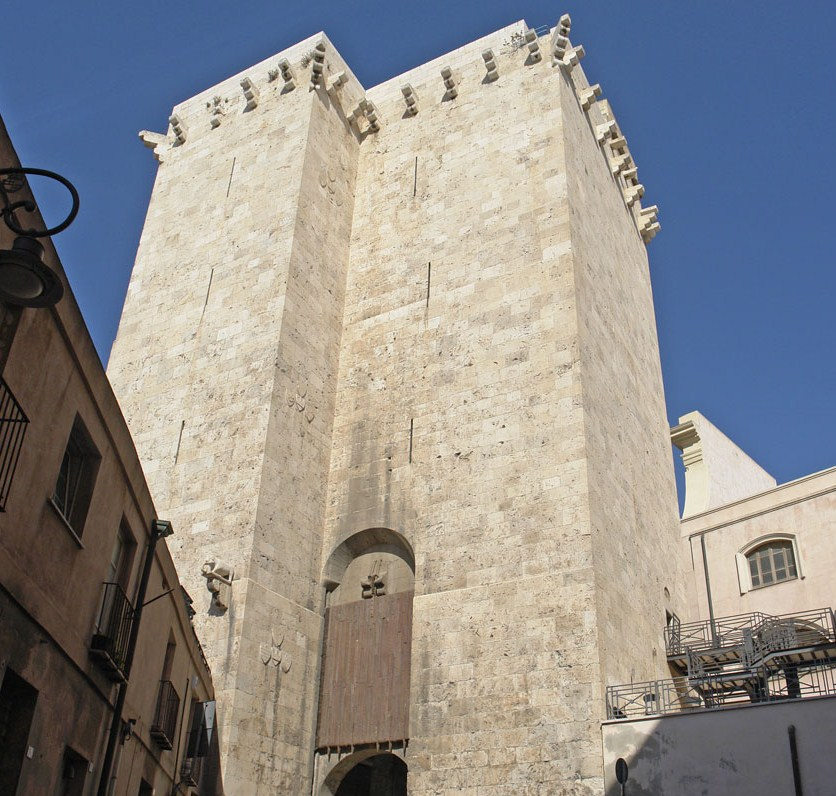
The impressive mediaeval Elephant Tower

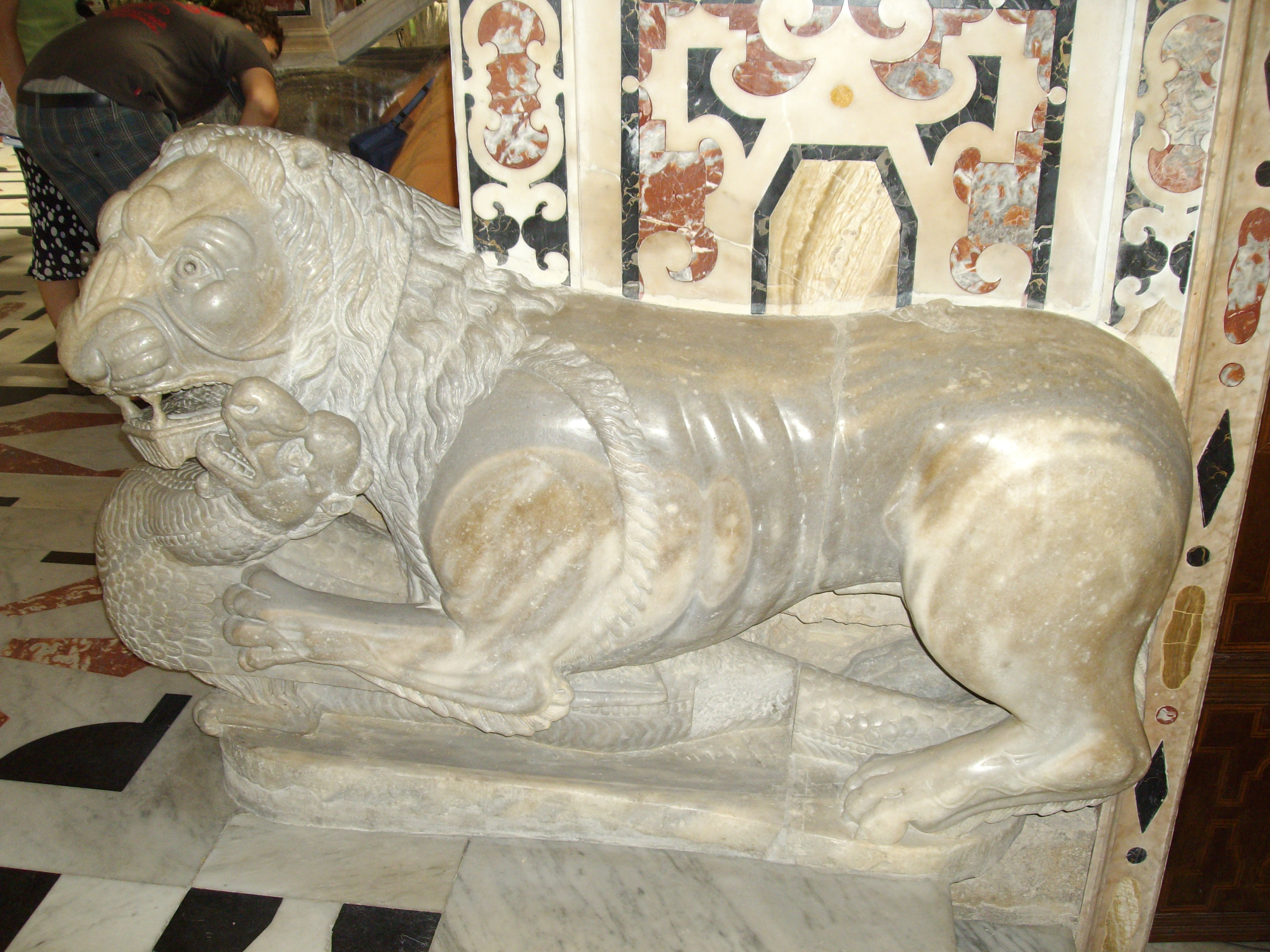
Pisan lion in the cathedral

In 1258 after the defeat of William III, the last giudice of Cagliari, the Pisans and their Sardinian allies (Arborea, Gallura and Logudoro) destroyed the old capital of Santa Igia. The Giudicato of Cagliari was divided into three parts: the northwest third went to Gallura; the centre was incorporated into Arborea; the region of Sulcis and Iglesiente in the south-west was given to the Pisan della Gherardesca family, while the Republic of Pisa maintained the control over its colony of Castel di Castro. But after the battle of Meloria (1284), won by Genoa, the power of Pisa began to decline: Pisa lost Corsica, and although the republic kept control of a large part of Sardinia, its pro-imperial policy placed it in opposition to the Pope, who decided to give the island to the Aragonese kings in 1298, granting them the title of King of Sardinia and Corsica. Pisa responded by assuming direct control of the territories controlled as manor by Pisan citizens and increasingly reinforced the defenses of the island and in particular those of the Castle of Cagliari.

In fact, only in 1323 did the Aragonese organized the invasion of Pisan Sardinia. With a large fleet coming from Catalonia they landed in the south-west of the island and proceeded to besiege Cagliari in 1324. After two years the Pisans capitulated and surrendered to the King of Aragon. At that time the Kingdom of Sardinia was born and Cagliari became its capital.

== Conquest by the King of Aragon ==
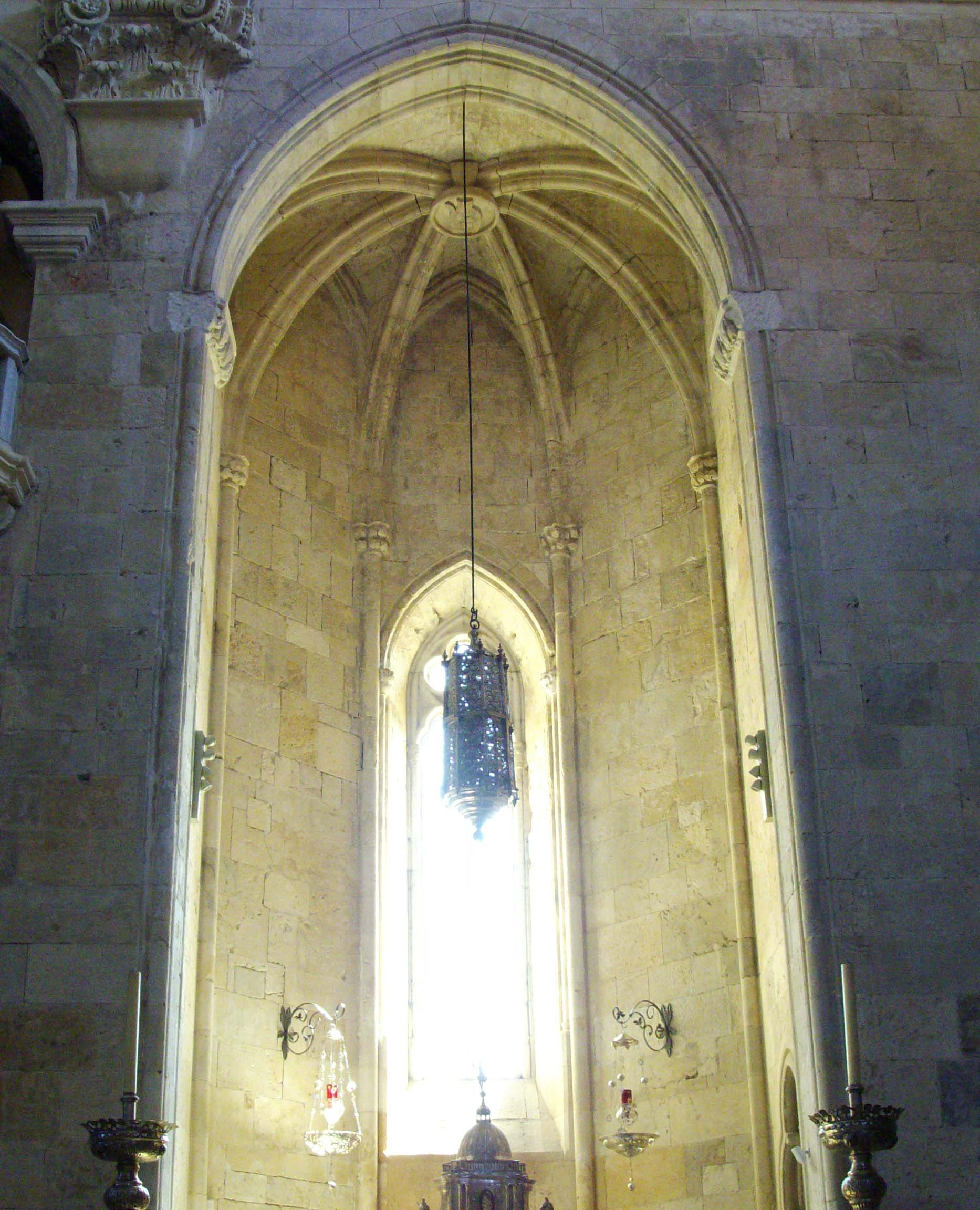
Gothic Aragonese chapel in the cathedral

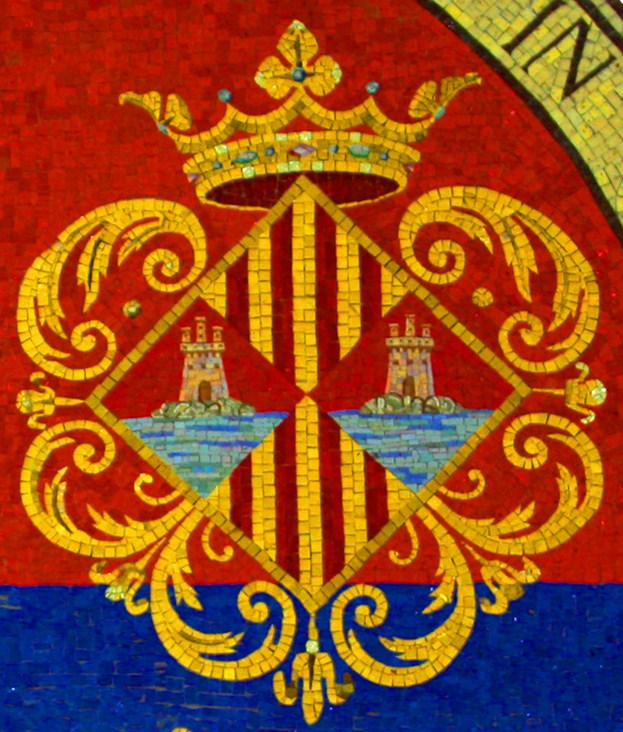
18th century coat of arms with the Bars of Aragon

In June 1326 the Crown of Aragon conquered Cagliari (Castel di Castro) after the surrender of the Pisans. When Sardinia was finally conquered by the Catalan-Aragonese army, Cagliari (Castel de Càller or simply Càller in Catalan) became the administrative capital of the newborn Kingdom of Sardinia, one of the many kingdoms forming the Crown of Aragon, which later came under the rule of the Spanish Empire.

Since 1326, the city, having expelled the Pisans and been repopulated by Catalans, Valencians and Aragonese, began a new period of development, soon interrupted by the war between the Kingdom of Sardinia and the Judicate of Arborea. The war lasted, with ups and downs, from the mid-14th century to 1420, with the Judicatus full debellatio. During this long period, the city, along with the city of Alghero, was often the Aragonese monarchs' only garrison on the island and it never fell into the hands of Arborences.

The Kings of Aragon, and later the Kings of Spain (who were also Kings of Sardinia), were represented in Cagliari by a Viceroy. The city was enclosed in strong fortifications and its architecture was oriented towards the late Catalan Gothic style.

== Spanish Habsburg era ==
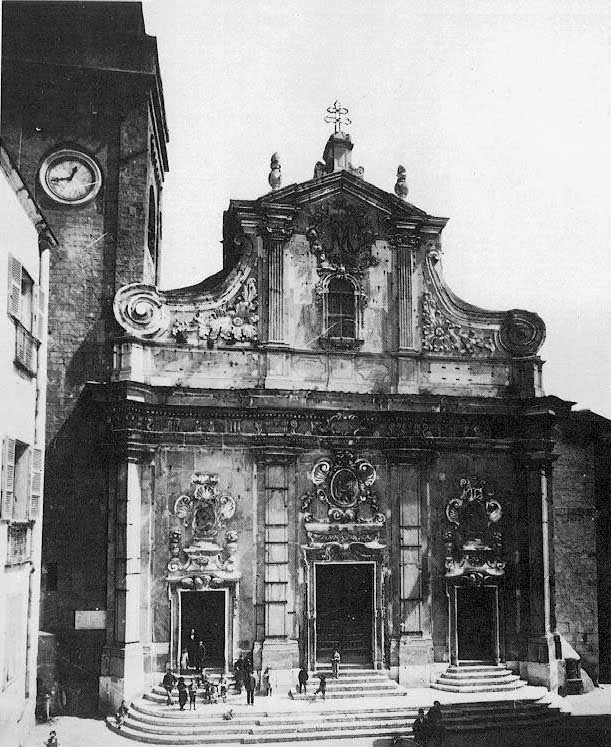
Old Baroque façade of Cagliari Cathedral

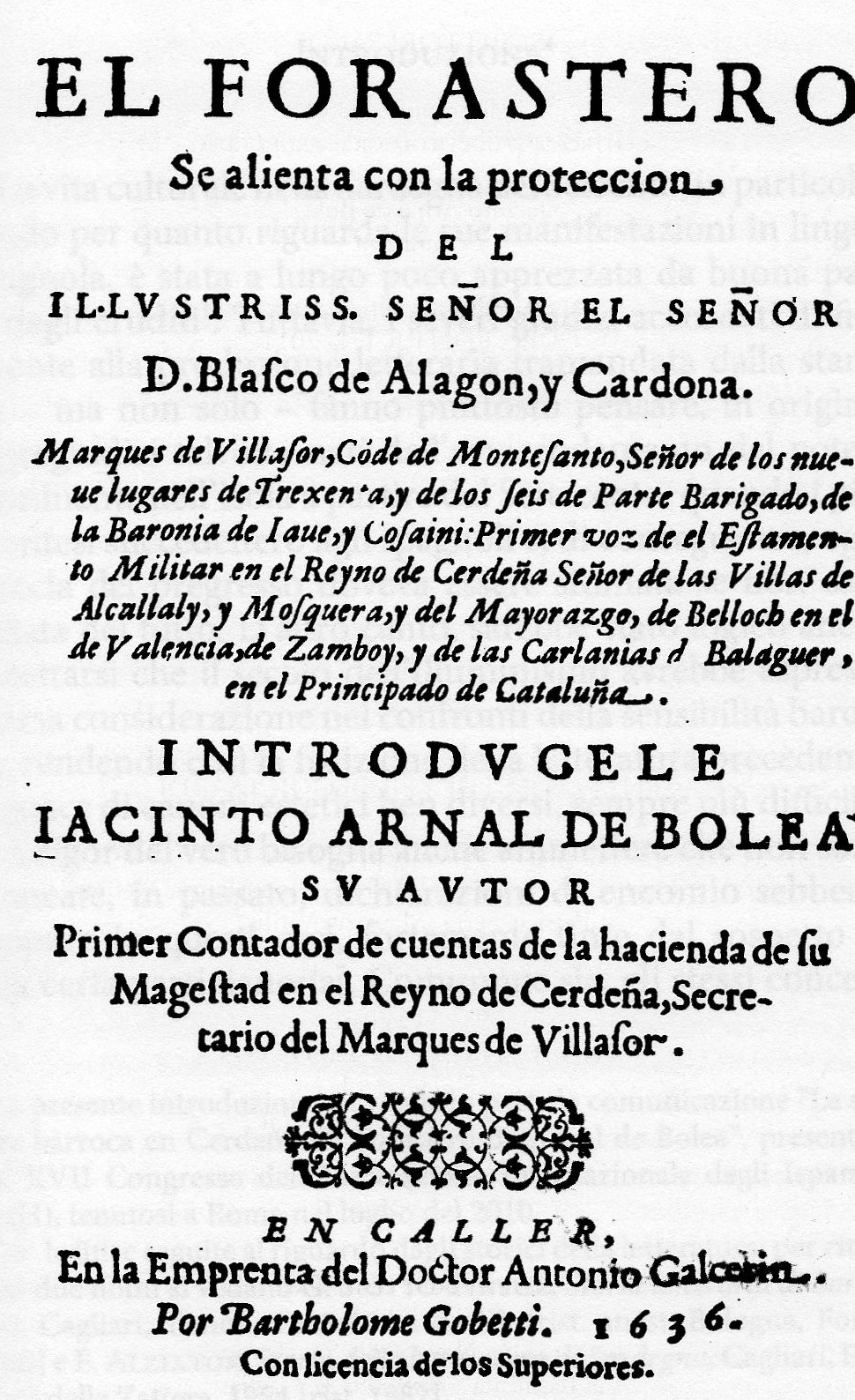
El Forastero

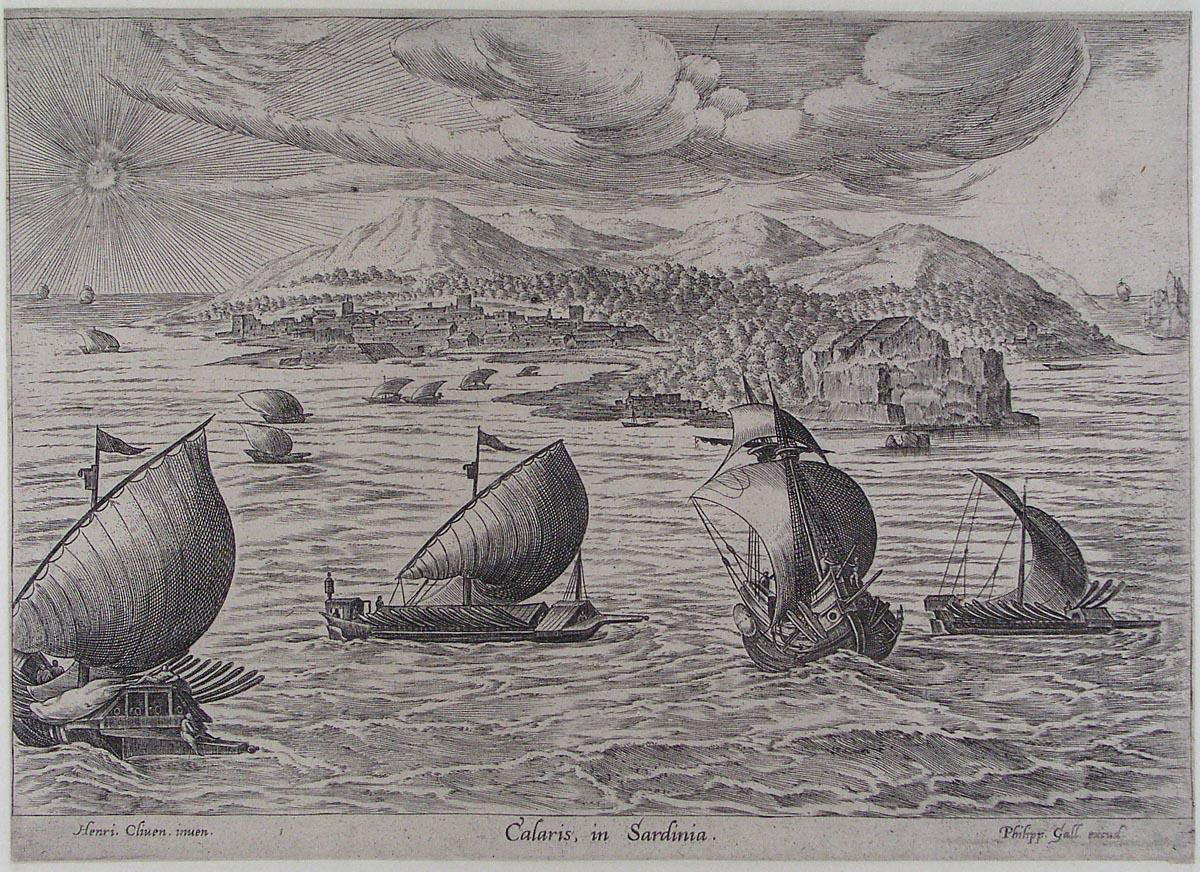
View of Cagliari by Hendrick van Cleve III (16th century)

With the marriage of Ferdinand II of Aragon and Isabella of Castile, Cagliari and the whole of Sardinia were bound more and more to the nascent Spanish state. The Catalan language was the official language of the Cortes of the Kingdom, but its active use gradually died out in the city, overwhelmed by Sardinian in everyday use in every social class, even in the nobility, and it was replaced by Spanish as the language of culture and government.

The city remained the capital of the Kingdom and the most wealthy and populous city, with its status of royal and autonomous city. In it the Viceroy lived, the Cortes, the Parliament, was called every ten years, the Royal Audience, the supreme judiciary, met. Besides being the main export centre for Sardinian goods, its port was an inevitable staging point in the Central and Eastern Mediterranean routes to the Iberian peninsula. It was equipped with a powerful defense system of ramparts and bastions, which transformed it into the key stronghold for controlling the western Mediterranean.

In 1535 it received the visit of Emperor Charles V, right in the town harbor, where he gathered an impressive fleet with the aim to win over Tunis. Cultural life was vibrant, far from provincial, perfectly integrated in the cultural atmosphere of Habsburg Europe. Here were born or lived people of high caliber such as Sigismund Arquer, scholar, theologian, jurist and geographer, who died at the stake in Toledo, charged with being a Lutheran; the lawyers John Dexart, Francis Bellit, Antonio Canales de Vega and Francis Aleo; the physician Joan Thomas Porcell; the historian Giorgio Aleo; the theologian Dimas Serpi; Antonio Maria da Esterzili, author of the first play in Campidanese Sardinian; the writer Roderigo Hunno Baeza, author of "Caralis panegyricus", a poem in Latin, composed around 1516, in which he exalted the city of Cagliari; Jacinto de Arnal Bolea, author of the first novel set in Cagliari, El forastero; Juan Francisco Carmona; the writer and historian Salvatore Vidal; the poets Jose Delitala Y Castelvì and Joseph Zatrillas Vico; the political officer of the Spanish Empire and Marquis of San Felipe Vicente Bacallar Y Sanna. The latter was one of the founders of the Royal Spanish Academy and worked on the drafting of the first dictionary of the Castilian language.

There was also a renowned school of painting known as "Stampace" from the name of the urban district where the shops were, which had its major representatives in Peter Cavaro, the son of Michael, Peter Raxis the elder, and Antiochus Mainas. In 1606, the university was established as was the first public hospital. But the decadence that the Spanish Empire experienced in the second half of the seventeenth century also damaged the city and exposed it to a serious outbreak of plague in 1656, from which came by municipal vow the Feast of Saint Ephysius, still the most important religious event of the island.

== 18th century ==
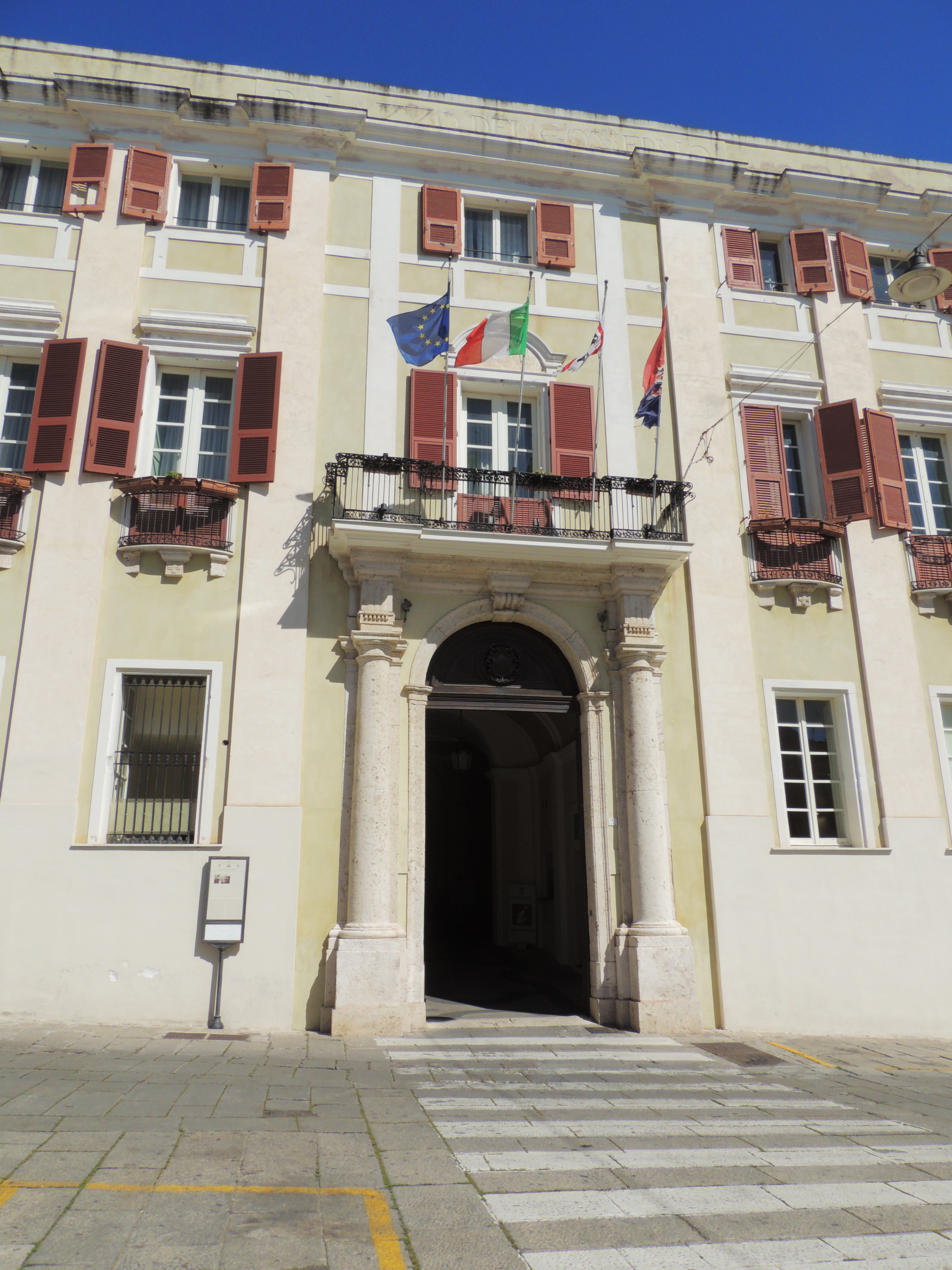
Entrance of the Royal Palace

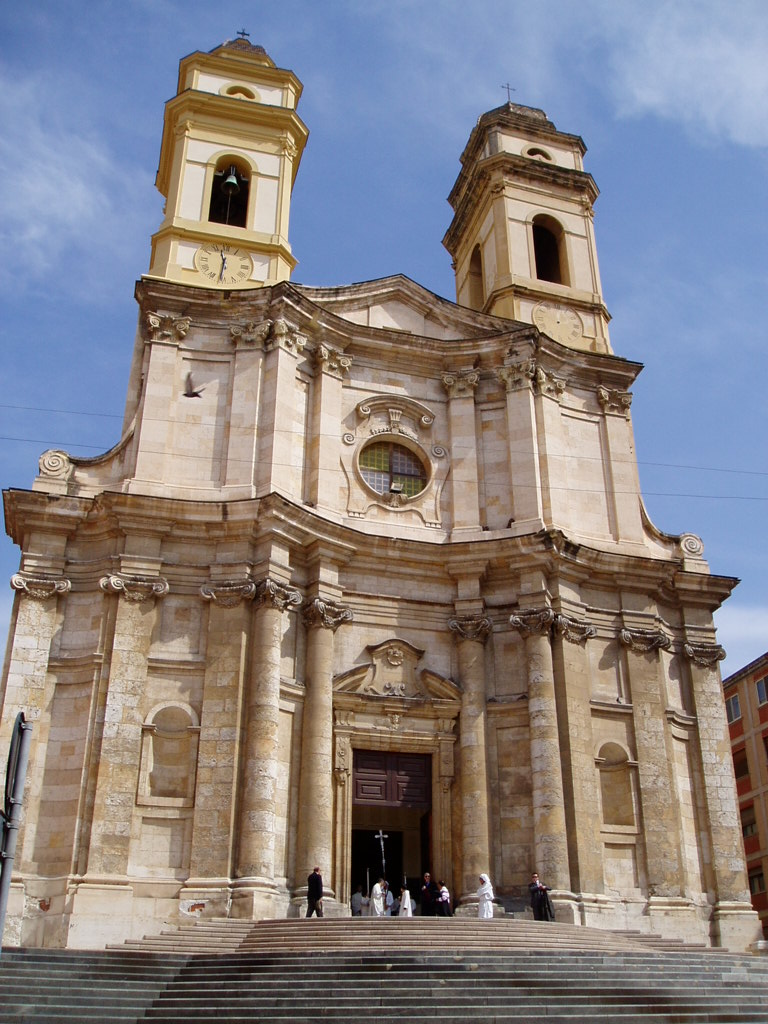
18th century Saint Anne church

In 1718, after the brief rule of the Austrian Habsburgs, the Savoy dynasty obtained the Kingdom of Sardinia, which remained an autonomous institution in relation to the mainland states of the dynasty and solemnly swore to respect the ancient customs and privileges. But the eighteenth century was the era of absolute monarchies, and the new ruling house gradually transformed the old kingdom created by the medieval Aragonese kings into one best suited to the needs of the new times. In order not to convene the parliament, the rulers did not increase the donativo, the taxes collected for the sovereign. For half a century Spanish remained the official language. The formal capital was Cagliari, but now all decisions were made at the court of Turin, residence of the monarchs. Nevertheless, the city slowly grew and benefitted from the Age of Enlightenment, with the reorganization of the university, the strengthening of the defense system, the restructuring of the Royal Palace, and access to the markets of central and northern Italy and Europe.

In the late 18th century during the Napoleonic Wars France tried to conquer Cagliari because of its strategic role in the Mediterranean Sea. A French army landed on Poetto Beach and advanced towards Cagliari, but was defeated by Sardinians who defended themselves against the revolutionary army. People from Cagliari hoped to receive some concession from the Savoys in return for their defense of the town. For example, aristocrats from Cagliari asked for a Sardinian representative in the parliament of the Kingdom. When the Savoys refused any concession to the Sardinians, inhabitants of Cagliari rose up against the Savoys and expelled all representatives of the kingdom and people from Piedmont. This insurgence is celebrated in Cagliari during the "Sa die de sa Sardigna" (Sardinian Day) on the last weekend of April. However, the Savoys regained control of the town after a brief period of autonomous rule.

== Modern era ==
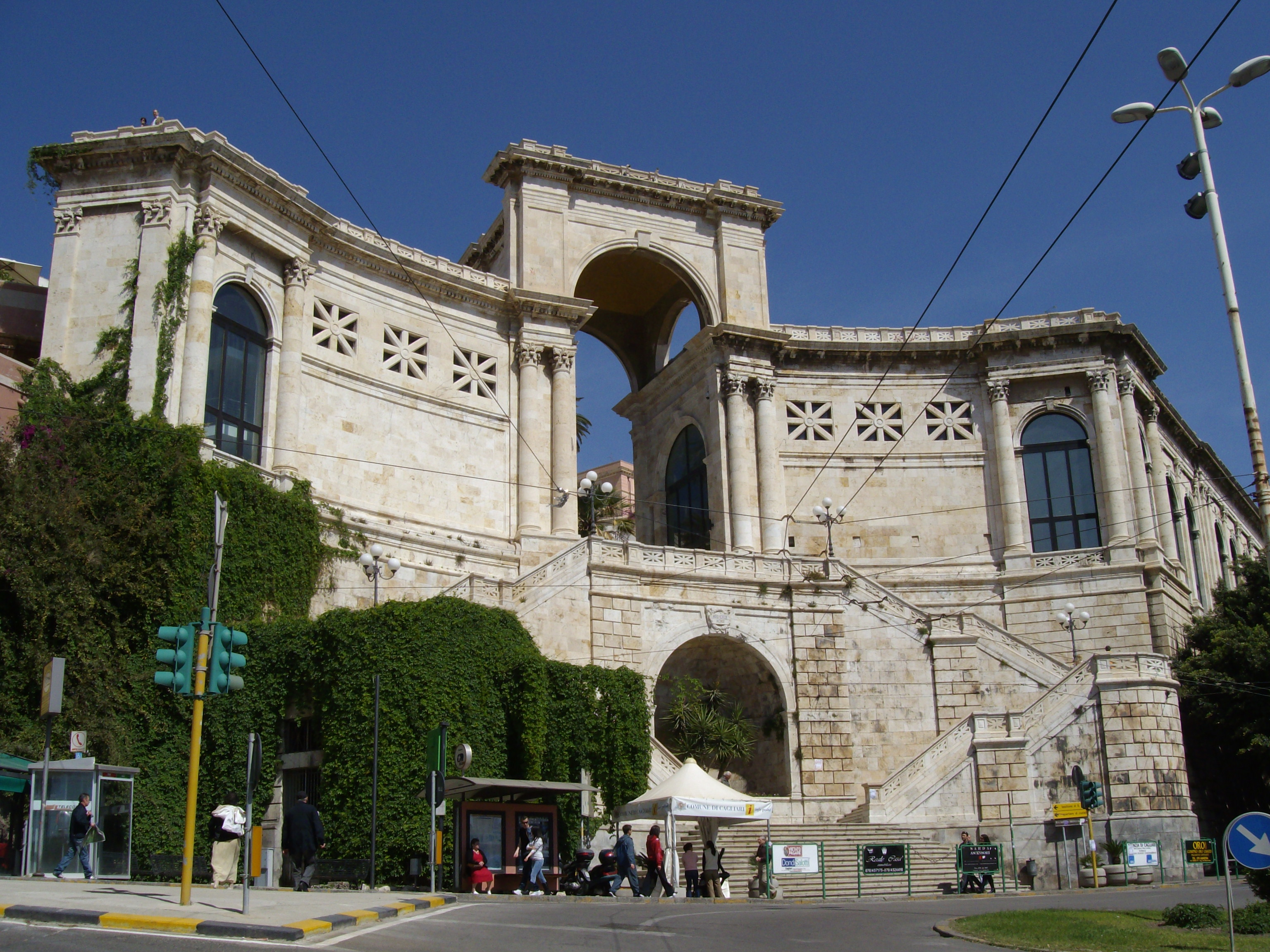
Triumphal Arch King Umberto I, better known as the Bastione of St Remy

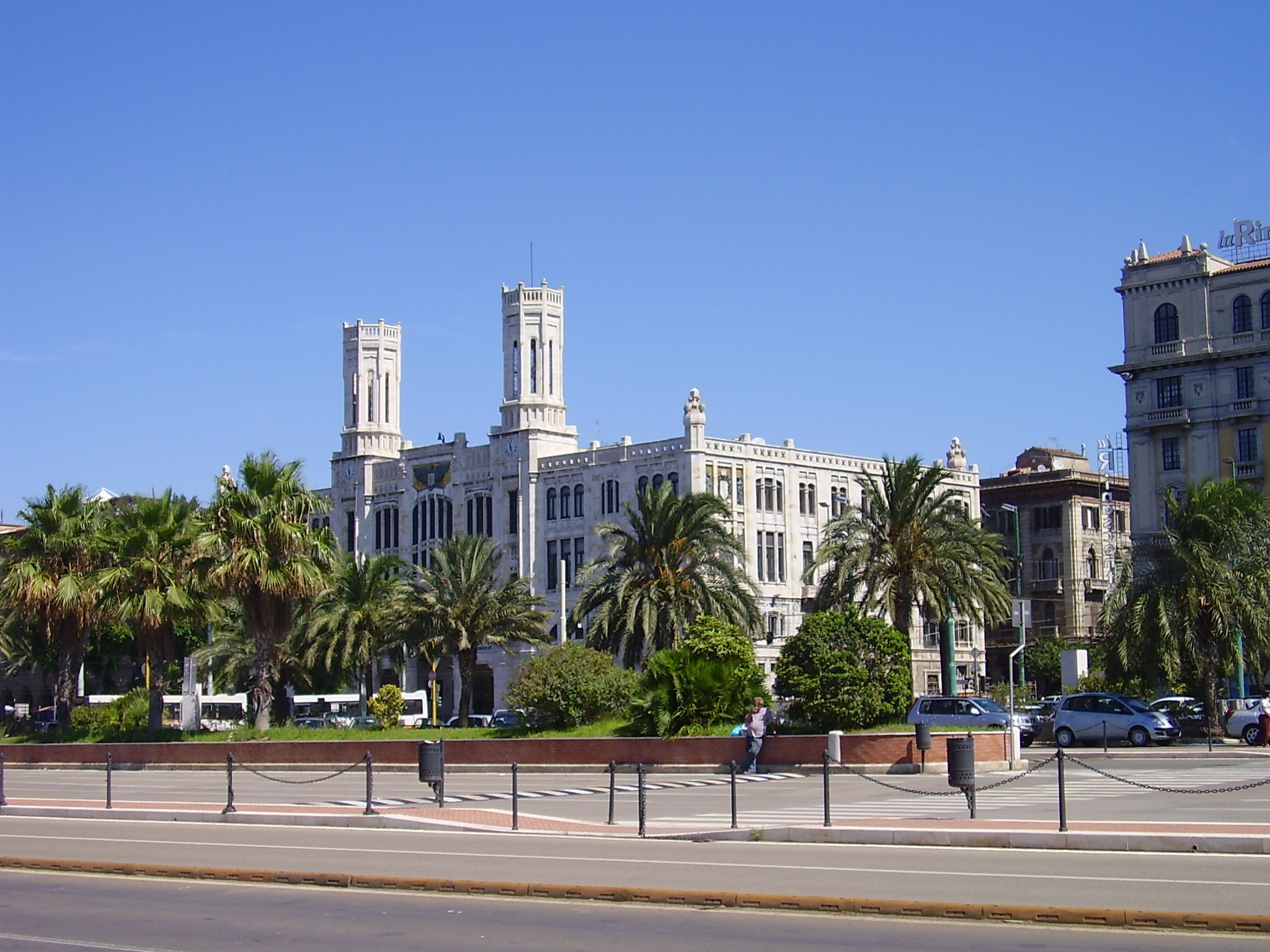
City Hall, Palazzo Bacaredda

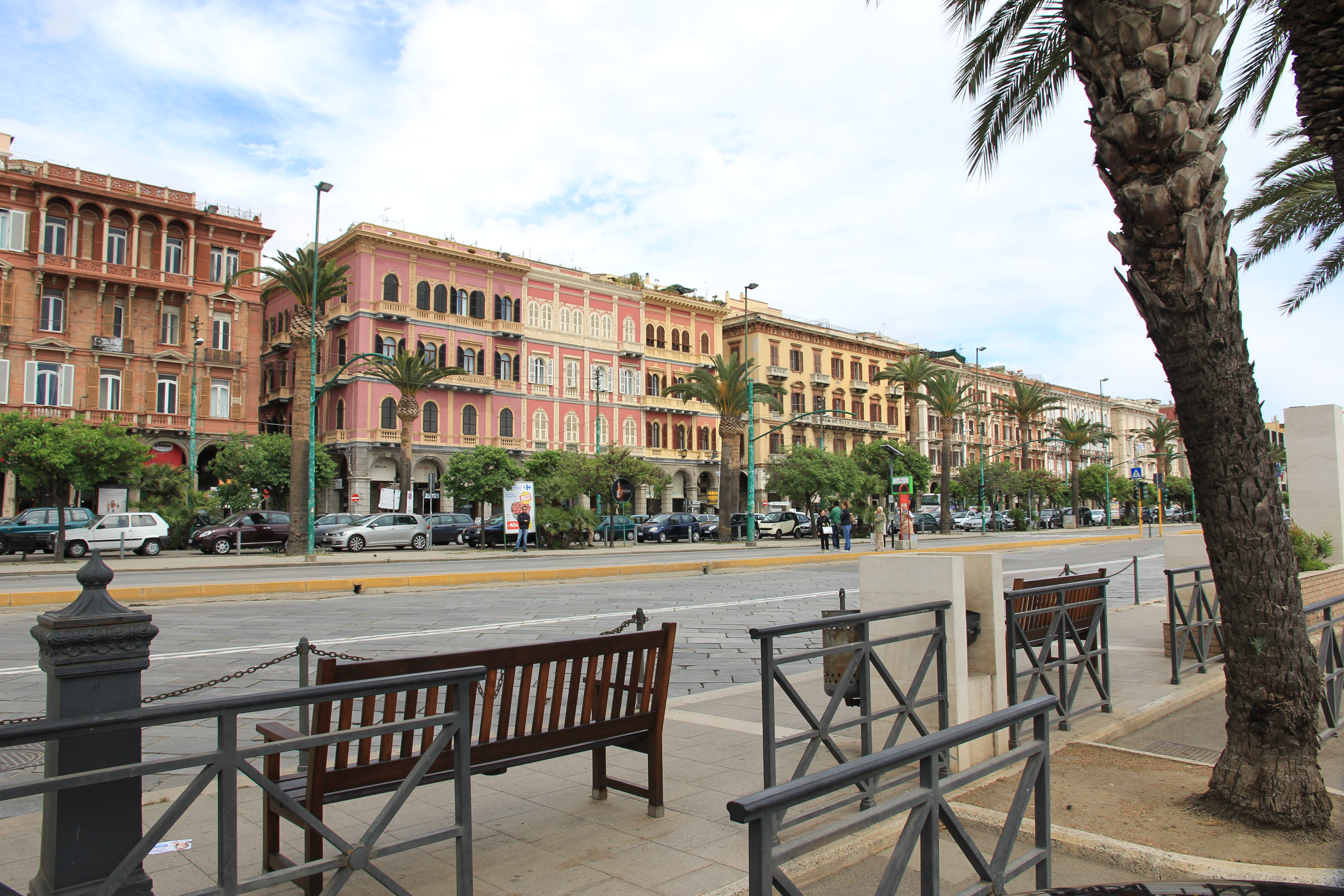
Via Roma porched avenue

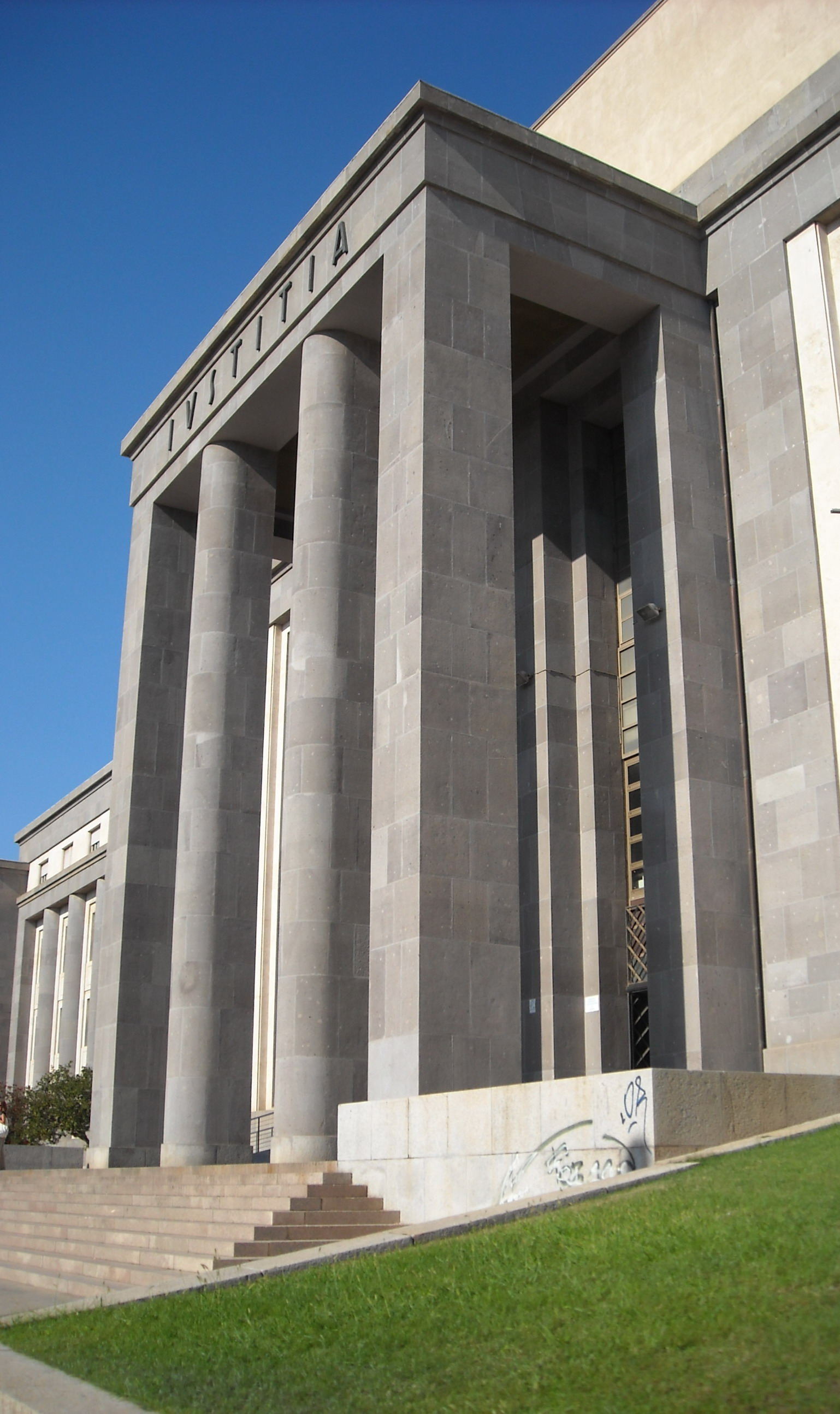
Fascist era tribunal palace

From the 1870s, with the unification of Italy, the city experienced a century of rapid growth.

The ancient medieval and 16th century walls were dismantled, wide avenues were opened and a rational urban plan was designed.

Many outstanding buildings were erected by the end of the 19th century during the office of Mayor Ottone Bacaredda. Many of these buildings combined influences from Art Nouveau together with the traditional Sardinian taste for floral decoration; an example is the white marble City Hall near the port. Ottone Bacaredda is also famous for the violent repression of one of the earliest worker strikes in the beginning of the 20th century.

In 1807 the first lanterns were installed for public urban lighting. In 1868 gas lighting began, and electric lighting in 1913.

In 1867 a dam was built in the locality of Corongiu under Mount Serpeddì to provide the city with a water supply service; until that time the city had been served by brackish well water.

In 1871 the first stretch of railway to connect Cagliari to Sassari and Porto Torres was inaugurated. The project was completed in 1881.

In 1893 a suburban steam tram service was started, connecting the city center with the towns that are now part of the metropolitan area, Monserrato, Selargius, Quartucciu, and Quartu Sant'Elena. In 1913 another steam tram line connected downtown with Poetto Beach. In 1915 the first two electric urban tram lines were inaugurated.

During the Fascist period the city experienced rapid population and economic growth and a monumental building policy inspired by the ideology of the regime. Fascist architecture and urbanism, such as the tribunal palace and the Carabinieri brigade commander palace, still constitute the main reference points of the modern city.

From 1861 to 1936, the population grew to about 88,000 inhabitants, an increase of 237%.

== World War II ==
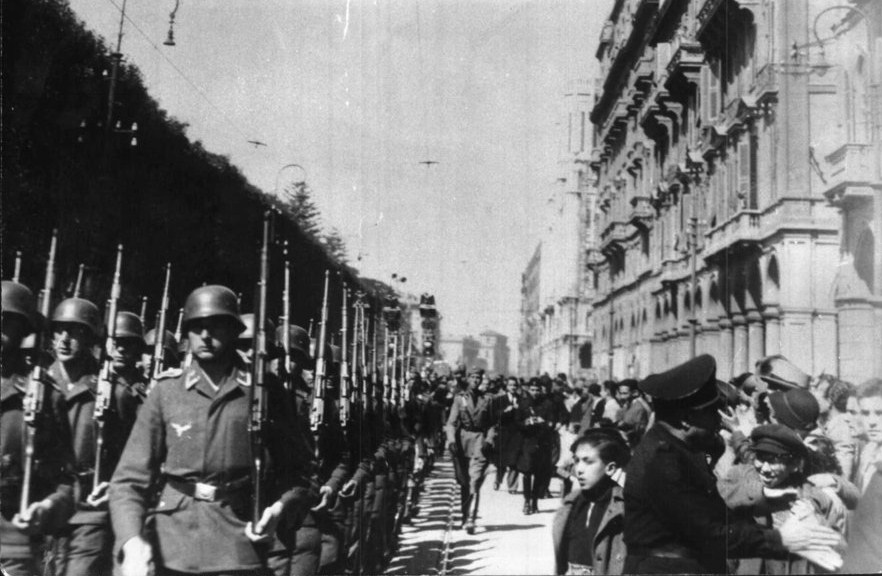
German Army parade in Via Roma

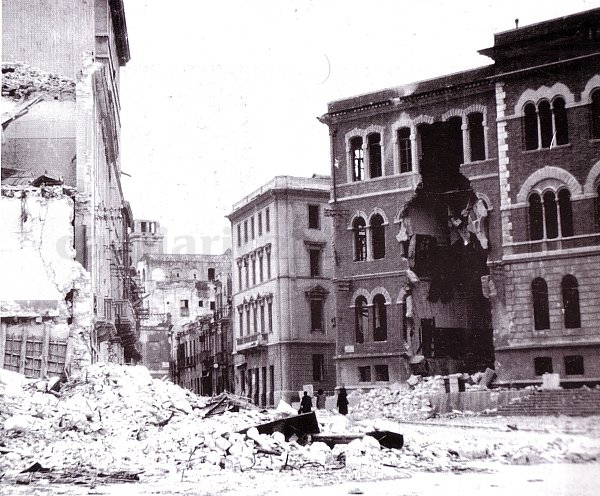
1943 bombing effects in Piazza Garibaldi

During World War II Cagliari was heavily bombed by the Allies in February 1943. There was a strategic bombing plan to destroy the Axis powers' military capability but also to terrorize their population and sabotage the economic war effort. The allied bombing caused the destruction or serious damage of 80% of the city's housing and the death of almost 2,000 civilians, due mostly to cluster bombs. The town was coventrated, as was said at that time. In order to escape the bombardments and the misery of the destroyed town, almost everyone left Cagliari and moved to the countryside or rural villages, often living with friends and relatives in overcrowded houses. This flight from the town was known as "sfollamento" (deserting).

After the Italian armistice with the Allies in September 1943, the German Army took control of Cagliari and the island, but soon retreated peacefully in order to reinforce its positions in mainland Italy. The US Army then took control of Cagliari. Cagliari was strategically important during the war because of its location in the Mediterranean Sea. Many airports were near Cagliari: (Elmas, Monserrato, Decimomannu, the latter currently a NATO airbase) from which airplanes can fly to Northern Africa or mainland Italy and Sicily.

== Reconstruction ==
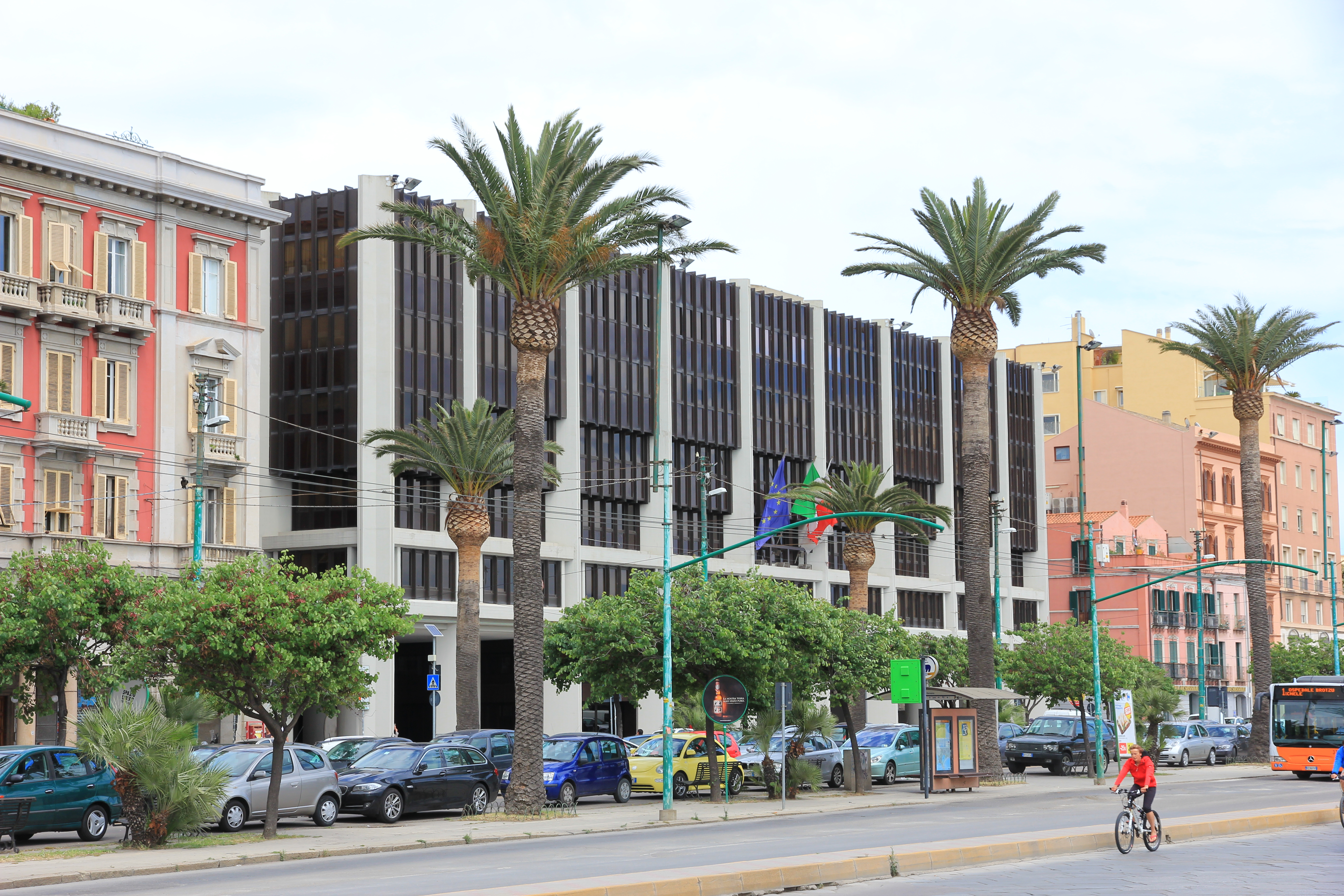
Via Roma Regional Parliament palace

After the war, the population of Cagliari rebounded. The city was so quickly rebuilt that there was talk of the Cagliari miracle, and many apartment blocks were erected in new residential districts, often created with poor planning as to recreational areas.

Some medieval churches, such as St. Dominic, St. Catherine and Saint Lucia, were demolished, as well as several buildings in the historic center. In their place there are still ruins or the emptiness of the urban fabric. In the city's most important cemetery there is a memorial on graves where nameless victims were buried.

The Constitution of the Italian Republic, born from the ruins of war declared by Benito Mussolini and the Savoy Monarchy, reconstituted the political unity of the island, begun with the Perfect Fusion in 1847, creating the Autonomous Region of Sardinia. Cagliari was declared the capital of the new autonomous institution. The offices of the region were concentrated in the city, which became the goal of a massive urban migration from other parts of the island. The population of all the municipalities of the metropolitan area increased by 205% between 1951 (221,734) and 2011 (453,728).

Cagliari is the hub of a modern metropolitan area of about half a million inhabitants. It is one of the largest and richest cities in Sardinia, with a standard of living comparable to that of several provinces and cities of Central and Northern Italy. In addition to being the center of administration of the Autonomous Region and peripheral administrations of the Italian State in Sardinia, it has a major port with a large container terminal, notable industrial development (one of the largest oil refineries in Europe), a large university, research centers, high-standard medical facilities, and one of the most important Italian airports. Cagliari also has a tourism industry.

== See also ==
- Timeline of Cagliari
