= Carallia (Pamphylia) =

Ancient city in Pamphylia

Coordinates: 36°41′01″N 31°53′09″E

Carallia (Ancient Greek: Καραλλία) was a city of the Roman province of Pamphylia Prima and is mentioned in the acts of the Council of Ephesus (431). The same form of the name is given in the acts of the Council of Chalcedon (451).

The 6th-century Synecdemus gives the name of this Pamphylian city as Καράλια (Caralia).

William Smith took the Pamphylian Carallia to be identical with the town of Carallis (Κάραλλις, Καράλλεια) in Isauria, which he identified with a place in Turkey called Kereli. The site of the Pamphylian town is supposed to be at Uskeles.

Modern scholars place Carallia near Güney Kalesi in Asiatic Turkey.

== Bishops ==
Extant documents give the names of three bishops of the ancient see of Carallia, a suffragan of the metropolitan see of Side, the capital of the province:

- Solon was at the Council of Ephesus in 431,
- Marcianus at the Council of Chalcedon in 451,
- Mennas at the Third Council of Constantinople in 680.

No longer a residential see, Carallia is today included in the Catholic Church's list of titular sees. Catholic Bishops of the town have been

- Cornelius Bronsveld (1950 - 1953)
- Pierre Khuât-Vañ-Tao(1955 - 1960)
- Louis Joseph Cabana(1960 - 1981)
