= Nuraghe Antigori =

Coordinates: 39.0953°N 9.0047°E

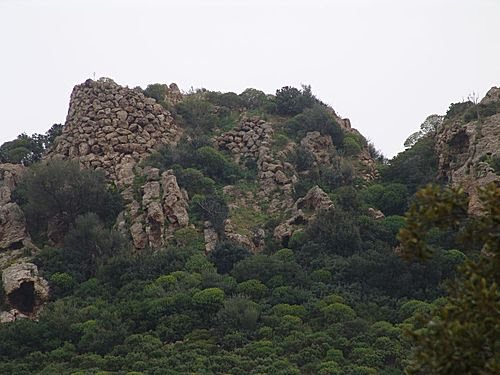
- Nuraghe Antigori

- Location within Sardinia
- Type: Monument
- Cultures: Nuragic civilization

Site notes
- Excavation dates: yes
- Condition: ruined
- Management: I Beni Culturali della Sardegna
- Public access: yes

The Nuraghe Antigori is a nuragic complex dating back to the second millennium BC. It's located in the municipality of Sarroch, in the Metropolitan City of Cagliari.

The site was built on a rocky peak called Antigori, on which the remains of several towers are scattered, most of which are in poor state of preservation; the only visitable one in its interior is the tower C, with the classic tholos coverture. A small, almost intact, wall and the foundations of the huts that formed a small village are still observable.

The complex was excavated in 1982 by Maria Luisa Ferrarese Ceruti and in 1994 by Roberta Relli. The excavations returned various nuragic and Mycenaean pottery (from Argolis, Crete, and Cyprus) dating back to the 14th-13th and 13th-12th century BC, a testimony of the important exchanges that took place between the Nuragic civilization and the Mycenaean civilization.

== Bibliography ==
- E. Atzeni, Stazioni all'aperto e officine litiche nel Campidano di Cagliari, in Studi Sardi, 14–15, 1957, pp. 68–128;
- M.L. Ferrarese Ceruti, Nuraghe Domu S'Orku (Sarroch, Cagliari), in Magna Grecia e mondo miceneo: nuovi documenti, Taranto, Istituto per la storia e l'archeologia della Magna Grecia, 1982, pp. 178–179;
- G. Lilliu, La civiltà dei Sardi dal paleolitico all'età dei nuraghi, Torino, Nuova ERI, 1988;
- M.L. Ferrarese Ceruti, La Sardegna e il mondo miceneo, in La civiltà nuragica, Milano, Electa, 1990;
- R. Relli, La torre C del complesso nuragico di Antigori (Sarroch): seconda nota allo scavo del vano superiore, in Quaderni della Soprintendenza Archeologica per le Province di Cagliari e Oristano, 11, 1, 1994, pp. 41–72.
