= State-Mafia Pact =

Alleged series of negotiations between the Italian government and Cosa Nostra

The term State-Mafia Pact (Italian: trattativa Stato-mafia) describes an alleged series of negotiations between important Italian government officials and Cosa Nostra members that began after the 1992 and 1993 terror attacks by the Sicilian Mafia with the aim to reach a deal to stop the attacks; some sources suggest that negotiations began even earlier. The supposed major term of the deal was to end "the Massacre Season" in return for a reduction in the detention measures provided for by Italy's Article 41-bis prison regime. 41-bis was the law by which the Antimafia pool, led by judge Giovanni Falcone, had condemned hundreds of mafia members to the "hard prison regime". The negotiation hypothesis has been the subject of long investigations, both by the courts and in the media. In 2021, the Court of Appeal of Palermo acquitted a close associate of former prime minister Silvio Berlusconi, while upholding the sentences of the mafia bosses. This ruling was confirmed by the Italian Supreme Court of Cassation in 2023.

== Historical background ==
According to reenactments, in September–October 1991, during some meetings of the Cosa Nostra "Interprovincial Commission" occurred in Enna or thereabouts and led by the boss Salvatore Riina, it was decided to start with terrorist actions, because 475 people suspected to be mafiosi were arrested. Mafia terrorism against Italian state had to be claimed under the name "Falange Armata". Thereupon, in December 1991, there was another "Interprovincial Commission" meeting, always led by Riina, in which it was decided to hit in particular the judges Giovanni Falcone, Paolo Borsellino and several politicians: Sicilian deputy Salvo Lima and his assistant Sebastiano Purpura, the minister for extraordinary intervents of the Mezzogiorno Calogero Mannino, the minister of Justice Claudio Martelli, the minister of Communications Carlo Vizzini and the minister of Defence Salvo Andò.

Claudio Martelli was watched by mafia bosses because according to the pentiti Angelo Siino, Nino Giuffrè and Gaspare Spatuzza he was between "those four crasti (Sicilian for cuckholded) socialists who first took our votes, in '87, and then waged war against us". In particular, Claudio Martelli called Giovanni Falcone as main chief for Penal Affairs in ministry.

On 30 January 1992, the Corte di Cassazione confirmed the Maxi Trial sentence that condemned Riina and many other bosses to life imprisonment. After the sentence, the bosses of Sicilian Mafia Commission and Interprovincial Commission decided to start the massacres season yet planned.

=== Premise ===
In 1992, the boss Giovanni Brusca tried to open a first negotiation through the mafioso Antonino Gioè (who will be one among the killers of Capaci bombing), which was put in contact by Bellini, an art trafficker linked to secret services. Through Gioè, Brusca made know to the Carabinieri Marshal Tempesta that, in return of the recovery of other precious artworks, he wanted the agreement of the house arrest for five mafiosi bosses, among which the father Bernardo Brusca. The Marshal Tempesta asked to his superiors, the Colonel Mario Mori and the Captain Giuseppe De Donno, and the answer was that "the request is unacceptable". Then Gioè threatened that they could have hit the Italian artistic heritage, referring to an attack against the Leaning Tower of Pisa.

=== Attacks ===
The corpse of Salvo Lima, murdered by mafia

On 12 March 1992, the deputy Salvo Lima, Sicilian parliamentarian of Democrazia Cristiana, was killed some days before the Italian general election since he was no more able to guarantee the interests of mafia clans within the government: in particular, he did not succeed in influencing the Maxi Trial in Cassation. Actually the real target was Giulio Andreotti: Cosa nostra would have retaliated on the prime minister, but he was too protected and unreachable. So the choice fell on the Andreotti's reference person in Sicily, and the homicide claimed with the tag "Falange Armata".

After the murder of Lima, the deputy Calogero Mannino, at the time nominated minister for extraordinary intervents of the Mezzogiorno in Andreotti VII Cabinet, got in touch (through marshal of Carabinieri Giuliano Guazzelli) with Antonio Subranni, at the time commander of ROS, because he was warned by a mafioso intimidation, a funeral flowers wreath, an evident death threat and he feared in turn to be killed.

On 4 April 1992, Marshal Guazzelli was killed along the road Agrigento-Porto Empedocle and the homicide was claimed again with the tag "Falange Armata". Guazzelli was killed since mafiosi bosses wanted to give a strong signal to Mannino and Subranni, to raise the game and to impose a high-level deal.

On 23 May there was the Capaci bombing, in which Giovanni Falcone was killed, since the Interprovincial and Provincial Commission of Cosa nostra and led by the boss Salvatore Riina wanted to revenge for his activity of antimafia magistrate. In the massacre even his wife Francesca Morvillo and three police escorts (Vito Schifani, Rocco Dicillo and Antonio Montinaro) lost their life. Also this time the attack was claimed with the tag "Falange Armata".

On 8 June the Italian Cabinet, after the Capaci bombing, approved the Decree Law "Scotti-Martelli" (also known as "Falcone Decree"), which introduced the Article 41-bis prison regime, that is the "hard prison regime" reserved to mafia inmates: the next day it came an anonymous phone call in the name of the tag "Falange Armata" which threatened to not modify the prison regimes. In the same time, the Carabinieri captain Giuseppe De Donno contacted Vito Ciancimino through his son Massimo on behalf of the colonel Mario Mori (at time ROS vice-commander) who informed General Subranni; in turn, Ciancimino and his son contacted Riina through Antonino Cinà (doctor and mafioso of San Lorenzo in Palermo). Moreover, the Carabinieri marshal Roberto Tempesta contacted Antonino Gioè (boss of the Family of Altofonte) through Paolo Bellini (former right-wing terrorist and police informer of the SISMI) in order to recover some robbed art; Tempesta informed Mori about those contacts.

At the end of June, captain De Donno met Liliana Ferraro, vice-chief of Penal Affairs, at the Ministry of Justice, to whom asked politic covering to the collaboration relationship with Ciancimino; Ferraro, moreover, invited him to refer it to the judge Paolo Borsellino. On 25 June colonel Mori and captain De Donno met judge Borsellino: according to that was referred by Mori and De Donno, during this meeting Borsellino discussed with the two officials about the investigations of the inquiry "mafia e appalti" ("mafia and tenders"). On 28 June Borsellino met in Rome Ferraro, who talked to him about the contacts between colonel Mori and Ciancimino: however Borsellino declared to be already informed about these contacts. The same day Amato I Cabinet took office: Amato nominated the Christian Democrat deputy Nicola Mancino as Ministry of the Interior in place of Vincenzo Scotti. In that time, Salvatore Riina showed to Salvatore Cancemi a requests list affirming that it was going on a negotiation with the Italian State concerning pentiti and prison; still in that period, Riina said also to Giovanni Brusca that he drew up a "papello" (a written piece of paper) of requests in exchange for the end of the attacks.

On 1 July the judge Borsellino, who was in Rome to interrogate the pentito Gaspare Mutolo, was invited to Viminale in order to meet the minister Mancino; according to Mutolo, Borsellino came back from the meeting visibly upset. In the same period, Giovanni Brusca received by Salvatore Biondino the instruction to suspend the preparation of the attack against Mannino because they were "working for more important things". According to Salvatore Cancemi, in those days Riina insisted to accelerate the murder of Borsellino and to execute it with impressive manners.

On 15 July Borsellino confided to his wife Agnese that General Subranni was close to mafia environments while some days before he told her that there was a contact between mafia and deviated parts of the State, and that soon he would also be killed. In the same time, Riina would have said to Brusca that the negotiation was abruptly interrupted and there was "a wall to be overstepped".

On 19 July, with an attack in via D'Amelio, in Palermo, Paolo Borsellino was killed. The attack was claimed again with the tag "Falange Armata". According to the prosecutor Nino di Matteo, the murder of Borsellino was executed in order to "protect the negotiation from the danger that judge Borsellino, become aware about it, revealed it and denounced publicly its existence, and so compromise irreversibly the desired result". From the place of the massacre Borsellino's red notebook, in which the magistrate annotated all his investigative intuitions and never separated from it, was not found. After the via D'Amelio bombing, the decree "Scotti-Martelli" was converted in law and over 100 particularly dangerous mafiosi inmates were transferred to Asinara prison and Pianosa prison, where they were submitted to the 41-bis regime that was applied even to other 400 mafiosi inmates.

On 20 July, one day after the attack in via D'Amelio, the public prosecutor's office in Palermo files the archiving request of the investigation defined "Mafia e Appalti" ("Mafia and Tenders"), on which both Giovanni Falcone and later Paolo Borsellino worked with great interest. The archiving decree was issued on 14 August 1992.

On 22 July Colonel Mori met lawyer Fernanda Contri (general secretary at Palazzo Chigi) in order that she referred to the prime minister Giuliano Amato about the occurred contacts with Ciancimino.

On 10 August a set of measure against mafia was definitively approved: 7000 soldiers were sent in Sicily and over 100 mafiosi bosses were transferred to Asinara penitentiary.

In September, Riina told Brusca that the negotiation was interrupted and that another "colpettino" (literally "a little pat") was necessary: for this, Riina appointed Brusca to prepare an assassination attempt against the judge Piero Grasso, but the attack did not work because of technical problems. In the same time, Colonel Mori met deputy Luciano Violante (then president of the Antimafia Commission) to support a secret summit with Ciancimino to discuss political problems, but the summit was rejected by Violante.

Between October and November, Giovanni Brusca and Antonino Gioè ordered to collocate an artillery bullet into Giardino di Boboli in Florence in order to create social alarm and fear and so to resume the negotiation with Marshal Tempesta: however the bullet was found only at a later time. At the same time Carabinieri General Francesco Delfino anticipated to minister Martelli that Riina would be individuated and arrested within December; on 12 December minister Mancino affirmed during a meeting in Palermo that Riina was going to be arrested, and in the same month Colonel Mori consigned a map of Palermo to Ciancimino in order that he indicated Riina's hideout, but on 19 December Ciancimino was arrested by police before he could give back the maps.

On 15 January 1993, in Palermo, Totò Riina, Cosa nostra boss, was arrested by ROS of Carabinieri, led by Colonel Mori and General Delfino, which used the new pentito Baldassare Di Maggio to identify Riina who was fugitive for 23 years. After the arrest, there were two mafioso groups with different ideas: one (formed by Leoluca Bagarella, Giovanni Brusca, brothers Filippo and Giuseppe Graviano) was favorable to continue the attacks against the Italian State, the other one (formed by Michelangelo La Barbera, Raffaele Ganci, Salvatore Cancemi, Matteo Motisi, Benedetto Spera, Nino Giuffrè, Pietro Aglieri) was against the continuation of the attacks. The boss Bernardo Provenzano played as peacemaker between these two fronts, and he succeeded to impose the condition to do attacks out of Sicily, in "continent".

On 9 February, there was another anonymous phone call on behalf of Falange Armata in which minister Mancino, the police general chief Vincenzo Parisi and Nicolò Amato (at that time chief of DAP) were threatened. The next day minister Martelli was forced to resign because the Tangentopoli scandal; the deputy Giovanni Conso succeeded him.

On 6 March, Nicolò Amato (sustained by Parisi and the minister of Interior) sent to minister Conso a long note in which he expressed his idea to abandon totally the article 41-bis and to refold on other penitentiary instruments in order to face mafia.

On 17 March, some self-styled relatives of mafiosi inmates, that were jailed in Asinara Penitentiary and Pianosa Penitentiary, sent a threatening letter to the President of Republic Oscar Luigi Scalfaro and, for information, to: the Pope; the bishop of Florence; the cardinal of Palermo; the prime minister Giuliano Amato; the ministers Conso and Mancino; the journalist Maurizio Costanzo; the deputy Vittorio Sgarbi; the CSM; the Giornale di Sicilia. On 1 April another phone call on behalf of Falange Armata threatened the president Scalfaro and the minister Mancino. On 14 May, Maurizio Costanzo avoid a car bomb explosion claimed by Falange Armata.

The subsequent attacks in Florence and Rome seemed direct against the other recipients of the letter. The magistrate Sebastiano Ardita, former chief of Direzione generale dei detenuti e del trattamento, wrote about links between the massacres and the article 41-bis events in his Ricatto allo Stato (Blackmail to the State):

Highlighting who were the other recipients of that letter is matter of great interest. They were names added "for information", but it appeared clear that an intervention against the article 41-bis was asked also to them. Among them there were the names of the Pope, of the bishop of Florence, of Maurizio Costanzo. Not by chance, few days later, on 14 May, the same Costanzo would have been the target of an attempt in front of the Teatro Parioli, where it hosted his talk show. It was evidently an intimidation against a journalist active against mafia, but also a help request to make public the problem of the inmates in the islands. It cannot be excluded that Costanzo's passiveness about the Cosa Nostra insistences and his resolute anti-mafia task were considered deserving for a model punishment. And it looks likewise disturbing the circumstance that the next attempt, again in May 1993, was in Florence. Whereas the third attempt proved to be directly against the Pope, because it happened exactly against the Vatican in the next July. So that collection of recipients, in short, seemed a victim list, if not of people, at least of location linked to them, and the President of the Republic remained at the top of that possible targets list. But Scalfaro, as well as those other recipients who had already suffered an attempt, maintained a rigorous and detached profile compared to those solicitations, denying himself to any request of intervention. Not a word, not a comment, not an institutional intervent to weaken the article 41 bis in order to distance from him those dangers. If that letter-threat was considered to maintain or to revoke the article 41-bis in the next November 1993, and how much weight was attributed to it, it's not easy to say, even because it is not mentioned in any official act. But for sure, even in light of the following attempts, it should have been a fact of maximum attention.

— Sebastiano Ardita, Ricatto allo Stato, Il Fatto Quotidiano

Between March and May 1993, 121 decrees for 41-bis regime were revoked under the sign of Edoardo Fazzioli (at the time deputy chief of DAP), as Amato suggested in his note of 6 March.

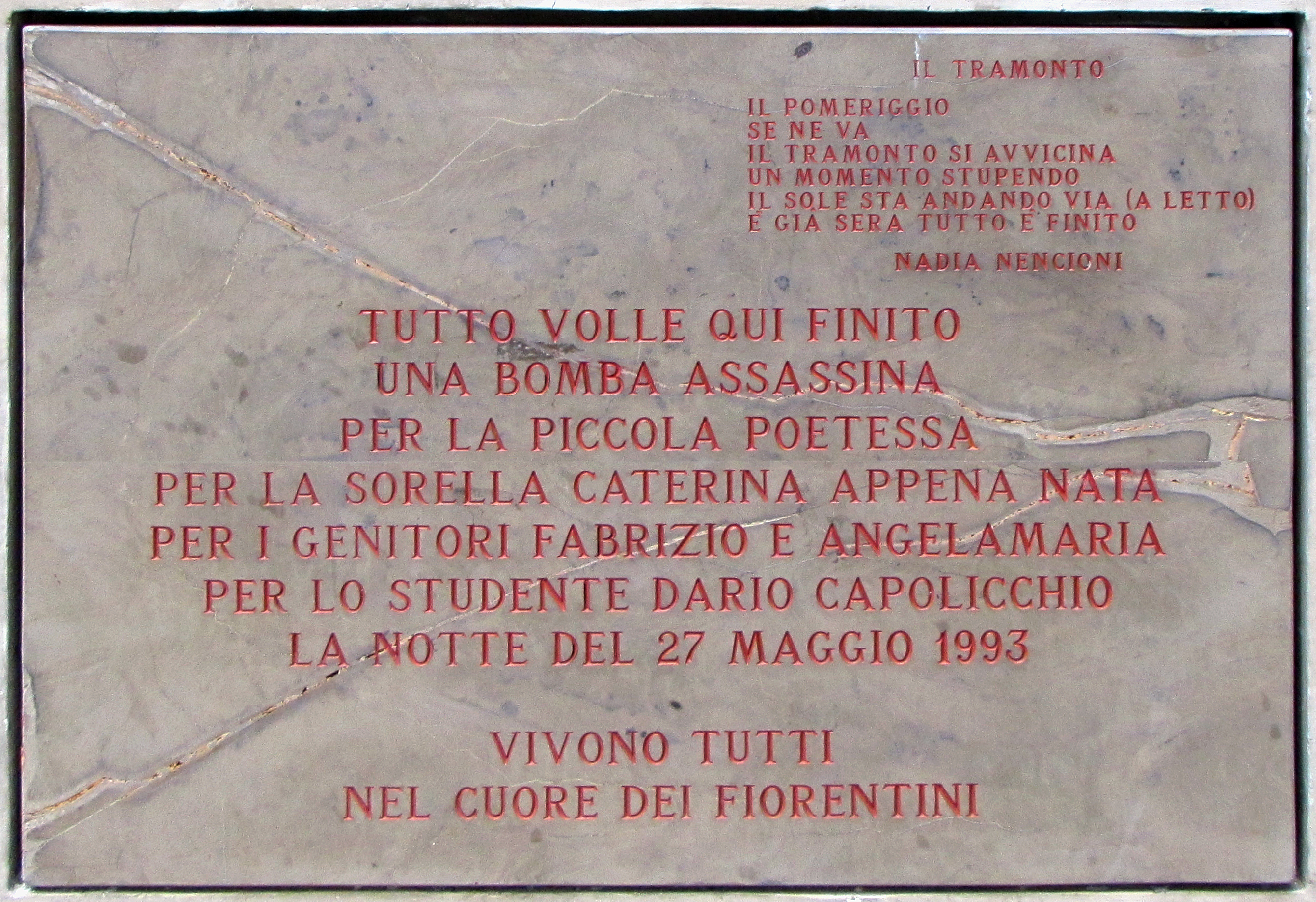
The commemorative plaque in Via dei Georgofili

On 27 May, in Florence, there was the Via dei Georgofili bombing that caused five victims and about 48 wounded, again under the tag Falange Armata.

Una trattativa indubbiamente ci fu e venne, quantomeno inizialmente, impostata su un do ut des. L'iniziativa fu assunta da rappresentanti delle istituzioni e non dagli uomini di mafia.

— Corte d'Assise of Florence, 2012, in the motivations to the chapter of the contacts between representatives of the Italian institutions and Cosa nostra, regarding the appeal sentence about the via dei Georgofili bombing.
Translation:

There was undoubtedly a negotiation, and it was, at least initially, based on a do ut des. The initiative was taken by representatives of the [Italian] institutions and not by mobsters.

In early June, Nicolò Amato was removed as chief of Dipartimento dell'amministrazione penitenziaria and was sent as representative of Italy within the Committee for the Prevention of Torture. The promotion seemed misleading to Amato, and shortly after he decided to leave the Public Administration in order to be lawyer. Even if after ten years in that office a replacement would be normal, in this case there would be uspecified disagreement with the president Oscar Luigi Scalfaro, according to former DAP deputy chief Edoardo Fazzioli. For his part, Scalfaro denied totally the existence of this disagreement. Nicolò Amato was replaced by Adalberto Capriotti, who at that time was general prosecutor at Appellate court in Trento.

Palermo prosecutors noticed that on 14 June 1993 the Falange Armata restarted to call, "showing satisfaction for the designation of Capriotti" and defining it "a victory for the Falange". After it other calls followed, in which Mancino and Parisi were threatened with death (on 19 June), then Capriotti and his vice Di Maggio (on 16 September).

On 26 June, Capriotti sent a note to Conso in which he explained his new way to secretly not extend 373 measures of 41 bis in November, that would have constituted "a positive signal of detente". On 22 July Salvatore Cancemi gives himself up to Carabinieri and showed immediately the intention to collaborate with justice. Between 20 and 27 July, the DAP extended numerous measures of 41 bis regarding several dangerous mafia criminals. On 27 July Col. Mori met Di Maggio to discuss about the "mafiosi inmates problem".

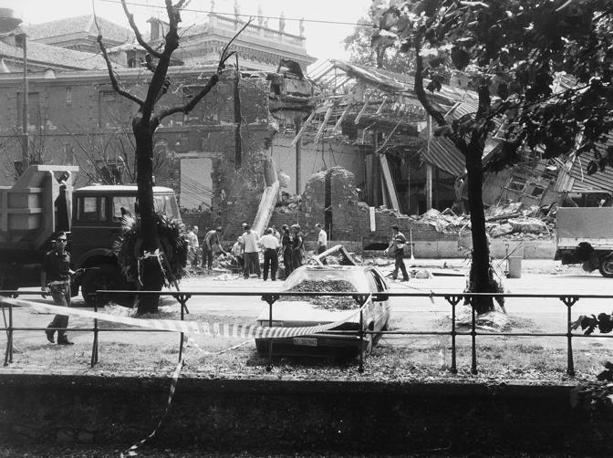
Via Palestro massacre

During the night between 27 and 28 July there were the Via Palestro massacre in Milan (five dead and thirteen wounded) and after few minutes two bomb cars exploded in front of San Giovanni in Laterano and San Giorgio al Velabro in Rome (both without victims). The next day two anonymous letters sent to the Il Messaggero and Corriere della Sera editorial staff blackmailed new attacks.

=== From Sicilia Libera to the contacts with Marcello Dell'Utri and Forza Italia foundation ===
On 22 October 1993 Col. Mori met again Di Maggio. In the same period, the businessman Tullio Cannella (trustworthy man of Leoluca Bagarella and Graviano brothers) founded the separatist movement Sicilia Libera (Free Sicily) that linked itself to other similar movements forming the Lega Meridionale (Southern League).

In October 1993, the pentito Gaspare Spatuzza declared that he met the boss Giuseppe Graviano at a bar in Rome to organize an attempt against Carabinieri during a soccer match at Stadio Olimpico; according to Spatuzza, in that occasion Graviano confided to him that they were obtaining all they wanted thanks to the contacts with Marcello Dell'Utri and, by him, with Silvio Berlusconi.

On 2 November 1993, the minister Conso did not renewed around 334 measures of 41 bis "to stop massacres" (according to him). However, on 23 January 1994, in Rome, the attempt at the Stadio Olimpico failed due a malfunctioning of the remote controller that should provocate the explosion. The attempt was not repeated. In that period, according to the pentito Tullio Cannella, Bernardo Provenzano and the Graviano brothers abandoned the Sicilia Libera project to give electoral support to the new political party Forza Italia founded by Silvio Berlusconi. According to the pentito Nino Giuffrè, the Graviano brothers dealt with Berlusconi by the businessman Gianni Jenna in order to obtain judicial benefits and 41 bis reworking in exchange for electoral support to Forza Italia; still according to Giuffrè, also Provenzano activated some channels to arrive to Marcello Dell'Utri and Berlusconi in order to present a list of requests about several arguments in which Cosa Nostra had interest. Even other pentiti talked about the support of Cosa Nostra to Forza Italia at the Italian general election of 1994.

On 27 January 1994 in Milan the Graviano brothers, which were involved in the organisation of all the attempts, were arrested: from that moment the massacres strategy of Cosa Nostra stopped.

== Papello and requests of Cosa Nostra ==
1. Revision of the Maxi Trial sentence;
2. Abrogation of Article 41-bis prison regime;
3. Revision of Rognoni-La Torre law (crime of "associazione di tipo mafioso", mafioso association);
4. Reform of the law about pentiti;
5. Recognition of dissociated benefits for mafia convicts;
6. House arrest for people older than 70 years;
7. Closure of "super-prisons";
8. Imprisonment near relatives houses;
9. No censorship on the relatives correspondences;
10. Prevention measure and relationship with relatives;
11. Arrest only in flagrante crime;
12. Tax exemption for gasoline in Sicily.

After the first list of requests, created directly by Cosa Nostra, there was a second list with some changes made by Vito Ciancimino (as showed by the son of Ciancimino, who consigned to judges both the documents).

== Subsequent events ==
=== Abrogation of the article 41-bis ===
The second request of the papello is the "abrogation of 41 bis", which concerns the "hard prison regime" for some categories of crimes, among which the organized crime. For this reason the investigators focused on probably linked episodes, like the fact that in 1993 about three hundred 41 bis applications were left to expire and Nicolò Amato was replaced as chief of Dipartimento dell'amministrazione penitenziaria.

The isolation of Totò Riina was revoked; moreover, several people who tried to modify the article 41-bis were involved. Calogero Mannino, investigated for the negotiation, received a notification in which "there are references about "pressures" that Mannino would have do on institutional figures and about 41-bis topic". Even Carlo Azeglio Ciampi and Oscar Luigi Scalfaro were called to testify: to Scalfaro was asked by letter to revoke the decree on the hard prison regime.

== See also ==
- È Stato la mafia
- Papello
- The State-Mafia Pact
