= Falange Armata =

Alleged Italian terrorist organisation

The Falange Armata (Italian for 'Armed Phalanx') was an alleged terrorist organisation that was active in Italy the early 1990s. While the name has been used to claim several murders and bombing attacks its membership or existence are disputed.

== History ==
The first claim under the name Falange Armata was made with a call to the ANSA switchboard in Bologna on 27 October 1990, concerning the murder of Umberto Mormile, an educator at Opera prison who had been killed on 11 April 1990.

Over the following years anonymous calls supposedly made on behalf of the organisation claimed a wide number of attacks later attributed to the White Uno Gang, Cosa Nostra, 'Ndrangheta, Camorra, and Sacra Corona Unita, including the Pilastro killings, the murders of Antonino Scopelliti, Salvo Lima, Giuliano Guazzelli, the Capaci and Via D'Amelio bombings, the derailment of the Lecce-Zurich train near Surbo, and other killings or bombings. In addition, the name was used to sign death threats against Presidents Francesco Cossiga and Oscar Luigi Scalfaro, Interior Minister Nicola Mancino, and high-profile prosecutors, journalists, businesspeople and politicians of various parties.

The wide scope of these claims (about 1,200 between 1990 and 1995) led investigators to suggest that the group was fictitious and that it was used to mislead inquiries into organised crime, or possibly that the calls were the work of a compulsive liar.

After thirteen years of inactivity Falange Armata resurfaced in February 2014 in a threatening letter sent to jailed Mafia boss Totò Riina.

== Theories over the organisation's nature and origins ==
In 2015, while called as a witness in the trial on the alleged State-Mafia Pact, Francesco Paolo Fulci, diplomat and former chairperson of the Executive Committee on Intelligence and Security Services, claimed that phone calls related to Falange Armata were found to originate from the peripheral offices of SISMI, Italy's military intelligence agency at the time:

"There was this case of the Falange Armata and so I appointed this SISDE analyst, his name was Davide De Luca, [...] I asked him to work on the claims. [...] After some days De Luca came to me and told me: this is the map of the places where the phone calls come from, and this is the map of the SISMI peripheral offices in Italy, the two maps coincided perfectly, and in addition De Luca told me that the calls occurred always during the working time".

— Giuseppe Pipitone, Il Fatto Quotidiano

Some Mafia pentiti, such as Filippo Malvagna, Maurizio Avola and Salvatore Grigoli have testified that the name Falange Armata was used to claim every terrorist-type action carried out by Cosa Nostra, originally on suggestion from military intelligence officials. However, higher-profile mafiosi such as Giovanni Brusca and Antonino Giuffrè have denied any knowledge of this practice.

Judge Piergiorgio Morosini in 2013 suggested that the attacks claimed by Falange Armata were part of a subversive strategy pursued by the Mafia with the support from far-right groups and officials within the intelligence services, a common line of inquiry.

== See also ==
- Armed, far-right organizations in Italy
