= Giuseppe Calò =

Italian mobster

- Mugshot of Giuseppe Calò
- Born: 30 September 1931 (age 95); Palermo, Kingdom of Italy
- Other names: Cassiere di Cosa Nostra ("Mafia's Cashier") "Don Pippo Calò"
- Occupation: Crime boss
- Status: Imprisoned since 1985
- Allegiance: Porta Nuova Mafia family / Sicilian Mafia
- Convictions: Mafia association, money laundering, multiple murder
- Penalty: 12 terms of life imprisonment

Giuseppe "Pippo" Calò (born 30 September 1931) is an Italian mobster and member of the Sicilian Mafia in Porta Nuova. He was referred to as the "cassiere di Cosa Nostra" ("cashier of Cosa Nostra") because he was heavily involved in the financial side of organized crime, primarily money laundering.

He was arrested in 1985 and sentenced to 23 years' imprisonment as part of the 1986-87 Maxi Trial. He was sentenced to life imprisonment in 1989 for organizing the 1984 Train 904 bombing and was given several further life sentences between 1995 and 2002. He was also charged with ordering the murder of Banco Ambrosiano chairman Roberto Calvi, nicknamed "God's banker" by the press because of his close business dealings with the Holy See, in 1982 but was acquitted in 2007 due to "insufficient evidence" in a surprise verdict.

== Boss of the Porta Nuova Mafia family ==
Born and raised in Palermo, the capital of Sicily, he was inducted into the Mafia family of Porta Nuova at the age of 23 after carrying out a murder to avenge his father.

Around 1962–1963, Giuseppe Calò became the head of the Porta Nuova Mafia family. He took over the leadership from Gaetano Filippone, an elder and respected figure in Cosa Nostra, who had held significant influence within the organization for many years. Calò was reportedly a distant relative of Filippone.

At the beginning of the 1970s, Calò moved to Rome. Under the guise of an antiques dealer and under the false identity of Mario Agliarolo he invested in real estate and laundered large proceeds of crime for many Mafia families. He was able to establish close links with common criminals of the Banda della Magliana, neo-fascist groups and members of the Italian intelligence agencies.

In 1974, Giuseppe Calò, as head of the Porta Nuova mandamento, sat on the Sicilian Mafia Commission, a group composed of the most powerful Mafia bosses from Palermo and its province, who regularly met, supposedly to iron out differences and solve disputes.

According to reports, in the mid-1970s Calò strengthened relations with historical bosses of the Neapolitan Camorra, such as Lorenzo Nuvoletta and Vincenzo Lubrano.

During the early 1980s, he supported Salvatore Riina and the Corleonesi during the Second Mafia War that decimated the rival Mafia families. During the war, Giuseppe Calò personally took part in the murder of his former best friend Tommaso Buscetta's sons in September 1982, as well as the killings of Palermo bosses Rosario Riccobono and Salvatore Scaglione on 30 November 1982.

== Bombing of 904 express train and arrest ==
Calò arranged the bombing of the 904 express train between Florence and Bologna on 23 December 1984 that killed 16 people and injured 267 others. It was meant to divert attention from the revelations given by various Mafia informants, including Buscetta. Calò and his men had joined up with neo-fascist terrorists and the Camorra boss Giuseppe Misso to carry out the attack.

Mafia boss Giuseppe Calò at the Maxi Trial

After several years as a fugitive, Calò was arrested on 30 March 1985, in a villa at Poggio San Lorenzo, in the province of Rieti, together with Antonio Rotolo, one of the Mafia's heroin movers. He was one of the hundreds of defendants at the Maxi Trial that started the following year, where he was charged with Mafia association, money laundering and the train bombing.

At the end of the Maxi Trial in December 1987, Calò was found guilty and given 23 years in prison. He was substituted by Salvatore Cancemi as capo mandamento of the Porta Nuova family.

In February 1989, Calò was convicted for ordering and organising the 904 train attack, and sentenced to life imprisonment, confirmed again in 1992.

== Murder of Roberto Calvi ==
In July 1991 the Mafia pentito (a mafioso turned informer) Francesco Marino Mannoia claimed that Roberto Calvi – nicknamed "God's banker" because he was in charge of Banco Ambrosiano, in which the Vatican Bank was the main share-holder – had been killed in 1982 because he had lost Mafia funds when the Banco Ambrosiano collapsed. According to Mannoia the killer was Francesco Di Carlo, a mafioso living in London at the time, and the order to kill Calvi had come from Calò and Licio Gelli, the head of the secret Italian masonic lodge Propaganda Due. When Di Carlo became an informer in June 1996, he denied that he was the killer, but admitted that he had been approached by Calò to do the job. However, Di Carlo could not be reached in time, and when he later called Calò, the latter said that everything had been taken care of already.

In 1997, Italian prosecutors in Rome implicated Calò in Calvi's murder, along with Flavio Carboni, a Sardinian businessman with wide-ranging interests, as well as Ernesto Diotallevi (one of the leaders of the Banda della Magliana, a Roman Mafia-like organization) and Di Carlo.

In July 2003, the prosecution concluded that the Mafia acted not only in its own interests, but also to ensure that Calvi could not blackmail "politico-institutional figures and [representatives] of freemasonry, the P2 lodge, and the Institute for the Works of Religion with whom he had invested substantial sums of money, some of it from Cosa Nostra and Italian public corporations". The trial finally began in October 2005.

In March 2007, prosecutor Luca Tescaroli requested life sentences for the already convicted Pippo Calò, Flavio Carboni, Ernesto Diotallevi and Calvi's bodyguard Silvano Vittor. Tescaroli began his conclusions by saying Calvi was killed "to punish him for taking large quantities of money from criminal organisations and especially the Mafia organisation known as the 'Cosa Nostra'".

On 6 June 2007, Calò and his co-defendants were acquitted of murdering Calvi. The presiding judge in the trial threw out the charges because of "insufficient evidence" in a surprise verdict after 20 months of evidence. Calò, who gave evidence from his high-security prison, denied the charges. "I had no interest in killing Calvi", he said. "I didn't have the time, nor the inclination. Besides, if I had wanted him dead do you not think I would have picked my own people to do the job?". Calò's defence argued there were others who had wanted Calvi silenced. On 7 May 2010, the Court of Appeals confirmed the acquittal of Calò and his co-defendants. On 18 November 2011, the Court of Cassation confirmed the acquittal.

== Further trials ==
In 1994, Calò was sentenced to another life sentence for the murder of Pietro Buscetta, brother-in-law of pentito Tommaso Buscetta, as well as three informants.

In 1995, in the trial for the murders of Piersanti Mattarella, Pio La Torre, Rosario di Salvo and Michele Reina, in which Calò was given a further life sentence together with Bernardo Provenzano, Michele Greco, Bernardo Brusca, Salvatore Riina, Francesco Madonia and Nenè Geraci. The same year, in the trial for the murder of General Carlo Alberto dalla Chiesa, Boris Giuliano, and Paolo Giaccone, Calò was sentenced to life imprisonment together with Bernardo Provenzano, Salvatore Riina, Bernardo Brusca, Francesco Madonia, Nenè Geraci and Francesco Spadaro.

In 1997, in the trial for the Capaci massacre in which the judge Giovanni Falcone, his wife Francesca Morvillo and their escort of Antonio Montinaro, Vito Schifani and Rocco Di Cillo, lost their lives, Calò was sentenced to life imprisonment together with the bosses Bernardo Provenzano, Salvatore Riina, Pietro Aglieri, Bernardo Brusca, Raffaele Ganci, Nenè Geraci, Benedetto Spera, Nitto Santapaola, Salvatore Montalto, Giuseppe Graviano and Matteo Motisi. The same year, in the trial for the murder of Judge Cesare Terranova, Calò received another life sentence along with Bernardo Provenzano, Michele Greco, Bernardo Brusca, Nenè Geraci, Francesco Madonia and Salvatore Riina.

In 1998, in the trial for the murder of the politician Salvo Lima, Calò was sentenced to life imprisonment together with Francesco Madonia, Bernardo Brusca, Salvatore Riina, Giuseppe Graviano, Pietro Aglieri, Salvatore Montalto, Giuseppe Montalto, Salvatore Buscemi, Nenè Geraci, Raffaele Ganci, Giuseppe Farinella, Benedetto Spera, Antonino Giuffrè, Salvatore Biondino, Michelangelo La Barbera, Simone Scalici, while Salvatore Cancemi and Giovanni Brusca were sentenced to 18 years in prison and the collaborators of Justice Francesco Onorato and Giovan Battista Ferrante (who confessed to the crime) were sentenced to 13 years as material perpetrators of the ambush. In 2003, the Cassation annulled the sentence to life imprisonment for Pietro Aglieri, Giuseppe Farinella, Giuseppe Graviano and Benedetto Spera. The same year, Calò was sentenced to life imprisonment together with Riina, Raffaele Ganci, Vincenzo Buccafusca and Giovanni Di Giacomo for the murders of the mafiosi Domenico Balducci and Giovanbattista Brusca, which took place in Rome in 1981.

In 1999, Calò was sentenced to life imprisonment in the trial against those responsible for the Via D'Amelio massacre, in which the judge Paolo Borsellino and five of his escort men lost their lives; together with him the bosses Bernardo Provenzano, Giuseppe "Piddu" Madonia, Nitto Santapaola, Giuseppe Farinella, Raffaele Ganci, Nino Giuffrè, Filippo Graviano, Michelangelo La Barbera, Giuseppe Montalto, Salvatore Montalto, Matteo Motisi, Salvatore Biondo, Cristoforo Cannella, Domenico Ganci and Stefano Ganci.

In 2000, Calò and a boss of the Caserta Camorra, Vincenzo Lubrano, were sentenced to life imprisonment for the murder of the trade unionist Franco Imposimato.

In 2002, Calò was sentenced to life imprisonment for the murder of judge Rocco Chinnici together with the bosses Bernardo Provenzano, Salvatore Riina, Raffaele Ganci, Antonino Madonia, Salvatore Buscemi, Nenè Geraci, Francesco Madonia, Salvatore and Giuseppe Montalto, Stefano Ganci and Vincenzo Galatolo. The same year, for the Capaci massacre, the Court of Cassation annulled the convictions at Court of Appeal of Catania, of Calò, Pietro Aglieri, Salvatore Buscemi, Giuseppe Farinella, Antonino Giuffrè, Francesco Madonia, Giuseppe Madonia, Giuseppe and Salvatore Montalto, Matteo Motisi and Benedetto Spera.

== Dissociation from the Mafia ==
In September 2001, in the course of the trial of the Via D'Amelio bombing that killed judge Paolo Borsellino and his escort, Pippo Calò declared he dissociated from Cosa Nostra. In an extraordinary statement, he admitted Cosa Nostra existed and that he had been part of its Commission – breaking the law of silence or omertà.

However, he did not become a pentito and refused to testify against his fellow mafiosi. Calò said he was prepared to face his own responsibility but would not name others. "I am a mafioso but I don't want to be accused of bloodbaths", he said.
