= Graviano family =

Crime family of the Sicilian mafia

Graviano Mafia family
- Founded: 1980s
- Founders: Benedetto Graviano; Filippo Graviano; Giuseppe Graviano; Nunzia Graviano
- Founding location: Palermo, Sicily, italy
- Territory: Brancaccio neighbourhood in Palermo
- Ethnicity: Sicilians
- Activities: drug trafficking, racketeering, murder
- Allies: Corleonesi (defunct) 'Ndrangheta

The Graviano family (Italian: [ɡraˈvjaːno]) is a Sicilian Mafia clan, composed of four mafioso siblings: Benedetto, Filippo, Giuseppe and Nunzia. Their father was Michele Graviano, uomo d'onore that belonged to the Brancaccio Mafia family and was murdered by Gaetano Grado in 1982.

== History ==
In 1990 the brothers Giuseppe and Filippo Graviano became heads of the Brancaccio-Ciaculli district, replacing the boss Giuseppe Lucchese who was in prison. After the arrest of the mafia boss Totò Riina, in January 1993, the remaining bosses, including Giuseppe Graviano, Matteo Messina Denaro, Giuseppe Barranca, Bernardo Provenzano, Francesco Giuliano, Cosimo Lo Nigro, Francesco Tagliavia, Giovanni Brusca, Leoluca Bagarella, Antonino Gioè and Gioacchino La Barbera met in the town of Santa Flavia on the outskirts of Bagheria. A massacre strategy against the state was put in place. This strategy involved a series of bomb attacks in 1993 in via dei Georgofili in Florence, in Via Palestro in Milan, in Piazza San Giovanni and in via San Teodoro in Rome. The Gravianos were identified as being responsible for selecting the men who would carry out the attacks. Both were given a life sentence.

=== Filippo and Giuseppe Graviano ===
Filippo and Giuseppe are the most well known members of the Graviano family, and the term "Graviano brothers" usually refers to the two of them. They are currently life sentenced to be the instigators of the priest Pino Puglisi's killing, and also for the Giovanni Falcone and Paolo Borsellino's massacres.

=== Nunzia Graviano ===
Nunzia Graviano (Palermo, 9 June 1968) is an Italian criminal, sister of Filippo and Giuseppe Graviano, the mafia leaders in the Brancaccio district of Palermo in the 1990s.

Nunzia Graviano, known as 'A Picciridda' ("the little girl"), reinvested the family's financial assets, modernizing the activities, while the other brothers were in prison. According to her accusation "She is the alter ego of her brothers in their territory and is capable of managing a large fortune." She is among the first women to have acted as the "regent" of a prominent Mafia family. She is reported to be the mastermind behind the Graviano brothers' financial strategy, following the Milan stock exchange, and was an avid reader of the financial newspaper Il Sole 24 Ore. Much of the Gravianos' wealth was invested in listed blue chip companies. She was also involved in money laundering abroad through a financial advisory firm in Luxembourg. Nunzia Graviano was arrested in July 1999 in Nice, France.

=== Benedetto Graviano ===
Benedetto Graviano (Palermo, 15 July 1958) is an Italian criminal, mafia boss in the Brancaccio district of Palermo in the 1990s. He is the oldest of the Graviano brothers.

He served five years in prison for Mafia. He was then arrested in July 2004 for cocaine trafficking, he allegedly financed 18 kilograms of that drug in a 'joint venture' with a clan of the 'Ndrangheta. The cocaine would have been shared among the Palermo jet set. After his release for lack of evidence, he was arrested again in February 2005 . Benedetto had resumed command of the Brancaccio area, after the arrest of the regent Giuseppe Guttadauro. The mafia family of Santa Maria di Gesù wanted to extend their borders to that area, but the Cosa Nostra bosses reached an agreement and let Bernardo Provenzano decide on the appointment, which went to Benedetto Graviano. According to some reports, however, he was not considered "very smart" by Totò Riina.
