= Seventh Andreotti government =

48th government of the Italian Republic

Andreotti VII Cabinet
- 48th Cabinet of Italy

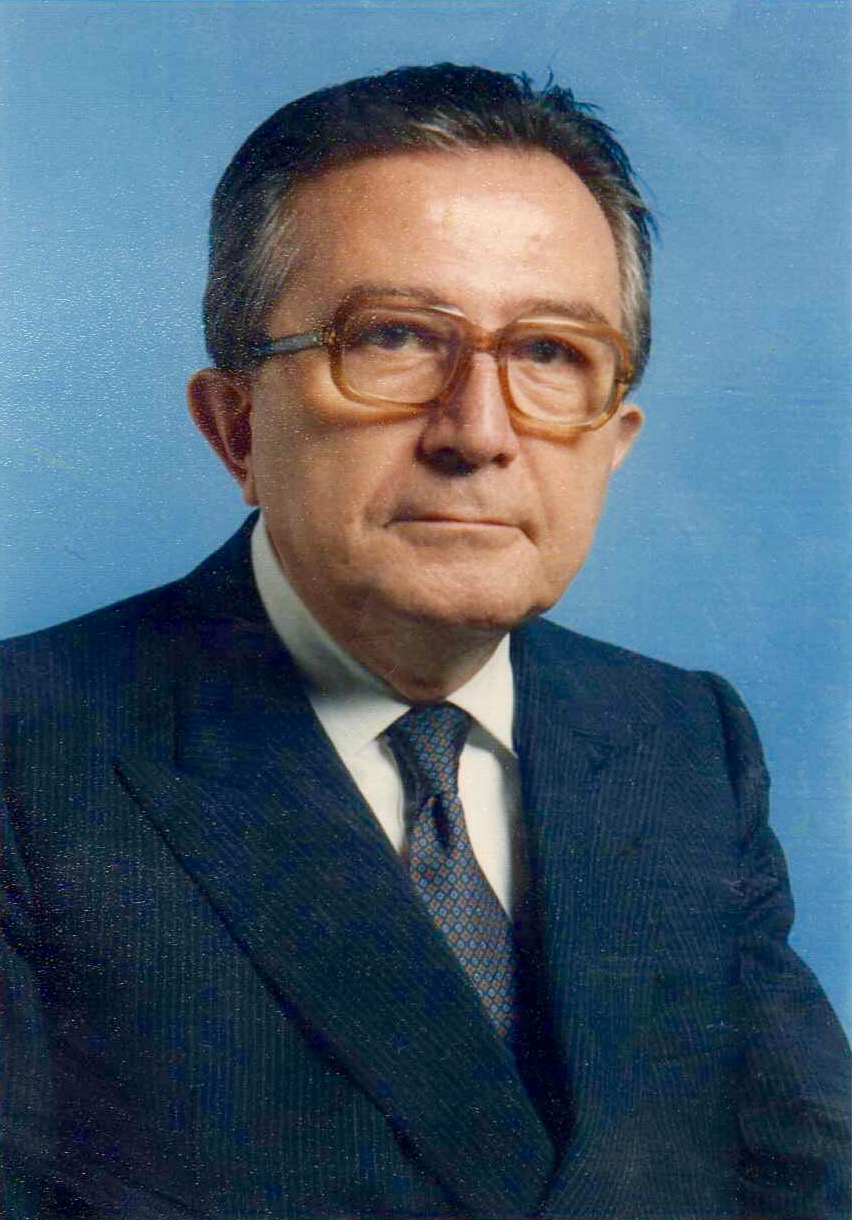
- Date formed: 12 April 1991
- Date dissolved: 28 June 1992 (444 days)

People and organisations
- Head of state: Francesco Cossiga
- Head of government: Giulio Andreotti
- Deputy head of government: Claudio Martelli
- Total no. of members: 30
- Member parties: DC, PSI, PSDI, PLI
- Status in legislature: Coalition government Quadripartito
- Opposition parties: PDS, MSI, PRI, PR, Greens, DP

History
- Outgoing election: 1992 election
- Legislature term: X Legislature (1987 – 1992)
- Predecessor: Andreotti VI Cabinet
- Successor: Amato I Cabinet

The Andreotti VII Cabinet was a cabinet of the Italian Republic. It held office from 1991 to 1992.

Initially the executive was also composed of three ministers of the Italian Republican Party (Antonio Maccanico as Minister for Regional Affairs, Adolfo Battaglia as Minister of State Holdings and Giuseppe Galasso as Minister of Cultural Heritage) who however did not take an oath, being the party left by the majority following the non-assignment of the Ministry of Post and Telecommunications.

Andreotti resigned on 24 April 1992.

== Party breakdown ==
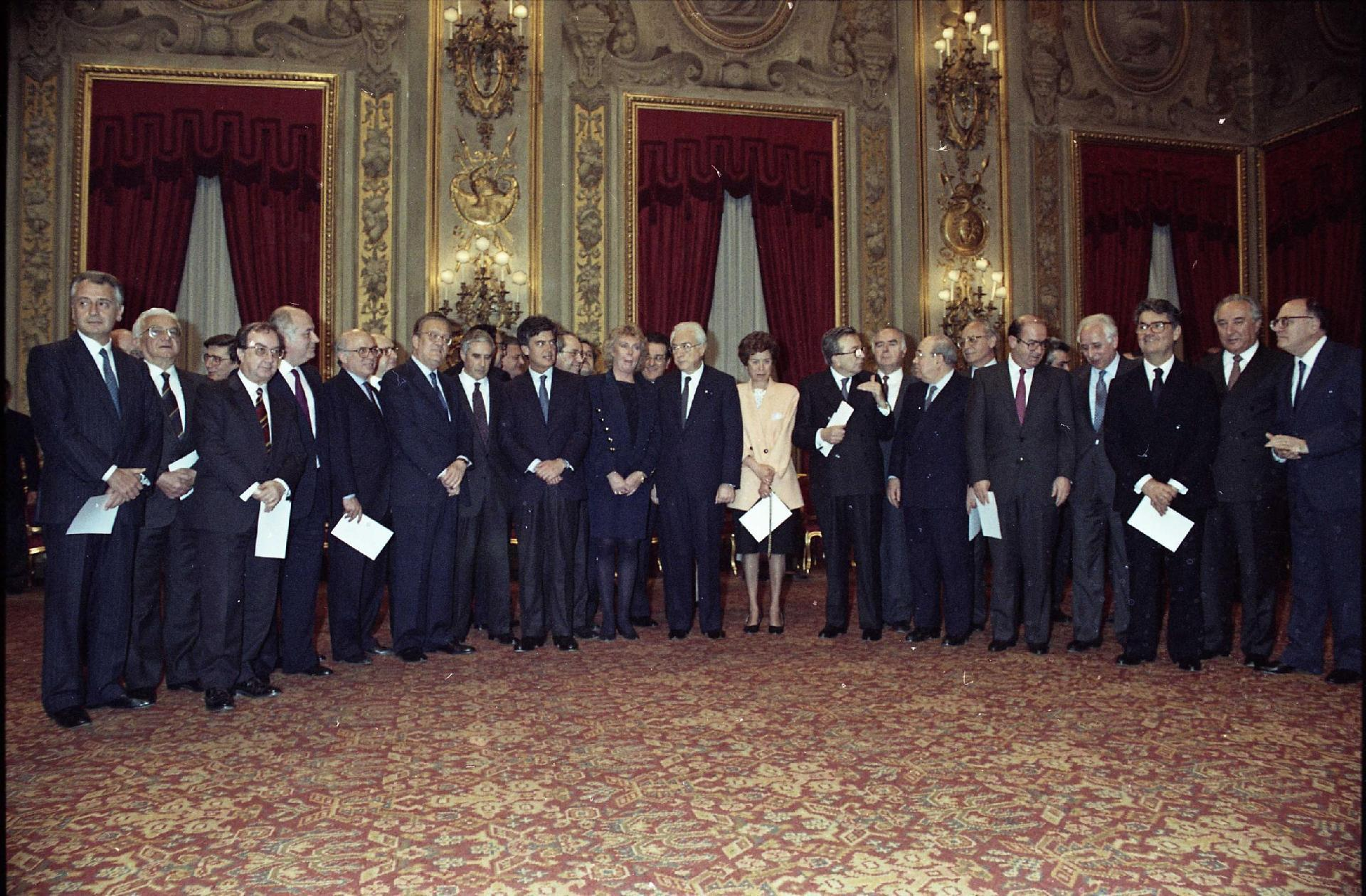
Official photo of the Andreotti's government after the oath at the Quirinal Palace

- Christian Democracy (DC): Prime Minister, 14 ministers and 38 undersecretaries
- Italian Socialist Party (PSI): Deputy Prime Minister, 10 ministers and 21 undersecretaries
- Italian Republican Party (PRI): 3 ministers and 6 undersecretaries
- Italian Democratic Socialist Party (PSDI): 2 ministers and 5 undersecretaries
- Italian Liberal Party (PLI): 2 ministers and 5 undersecretaries

== Composition ==
Portfolio	Minister	Took office	Left office	Party
Prime Minister	Giulio Andreotti	12 April 1991	28 June 1992	DC
Deputy Prime Minister	Claudio Martelli	13 April 1991	28 June 1992	PSI
Minister of Foreign Affairs	Gianni De Michelis	12 April 1991	28 June 1992	PSI
Minister of the Interior	Vincenzo Scotti	12 April 1991	28 June 1992	DC
Minister of Grace and Justice	Claudio Martelli	12 April 1991	28 June 1992	PSI
Minister of Budget and Economic Planning	Paolo Cirino Pomicino	12 April 1991	28 June 1992	DC
Minister of Finance	Rino Formica	12 April 1991	28 June 1992	PSI
Minister of Treasury	Guido Carli	12 April 1991	28 June 1992	DC
Minister of Defence	Virginio Rognoni	12 April 1991	28 June 1992	DC
Minister of Public Education	Riccardo Misasi	12 April 1991	28 June 1992	DC
Minister of Public Works	Giovanni Prandini	12 April 1991	28 June 1992	DC
Minister of Agriculture and Forests	Giovanni Goria	12 April 1991	28 June 1992	DC
Minister of Transport	Carlo Bernini	12 April 1991	28 June 1992	DC
Minister of Post and Telecommunications	Carlo Vizzini	12 April 1991	28 June 1992	PSDI
Minister of Industry, Commerce and Craftsmanship	Guido Bodrato	12 April 1991	28 June 1992	DC
Minister of Health	Francesco De Lorenzo	12 April 1991	28 June 1992	PLI
Minister of Foreign Trade	Vito Lattanzio	12 April 1991	28 June 1992	DC
Minister of Merchant Navy	Ferdinando Facchiano	12 April 1991	28 June 1992	PSDI
Minister of State Holdings	Giulio Andreotti (ad interim)	13 April 1991	28 June 1992	DC
Minister of Labour and Social Security	Franco Marini	12 April 1991	28 June 1992	DC
Minister of Cultural and Environmental Heritage	Giulio Andreotti (ad interim)	13 April 1991	28 June 1992	DC
Minister of Tourism and Entertainment	Carlo Tognoli	12 April 1991	28 June 1992	PSI
Minister of the Environment	Giorgio Ruffolo	12 April 1991	28 June 1992	PSI
Minister of University and Scientific Research	Antonio Ruberti	12 April 1991	28 June 1992	PSI
Minister of Regional Affairs (without portfolio)	Mino Martinazzoli	13 April 1991	28 June 1992	DC
Minister for Social Affairs (without portfolio)	Rosa Russo Iervolino	13 April 1991	28 June 1992	DC
Minister for the Coordination of Community Policies (without portfolio)	Pier Luigi Romita	13 April 1991	28 June 1992	PSI
Minister for the Coordination of Civil Protection (without portfolio)	Nicola Capria	13 April 1991	28 June 1992	PSI
Minister of Public Function (without portfolio)	Remo Gaspari	13 April 1991	28 June 1992	DC
Minister for Extraordinary Interventions in the South (without portfolio)	Calogero Mannino	13 April 1991	28 June 1992	DC
Minister for Italians Abroad and Immigration (without portfolio)	Margherita Boniver	13 April 1991	28 June 1992	PSI
Minister for Urban Areas Problems (without portfolio)	Carmelo Conte	13 April 1991	28 June 1992	PSI
Minister for Parliamentary Relations (without portfolio)	Egidio Sterpa	13 April 1991	28 June 1992	PLI
Minister for Institutional Reforms (without portfolio)	Mino Martinazzoli	13 April 1991	28 June 1992	DC
Secretary of the Council of Ministers	Nino Cristofori	13 April 1991	28 June 1992	DC
