= Sixth Andreotti government =

47th government of the Italian Republic

Andreotti VI Cabinet
- 47th Cabinet of Italy

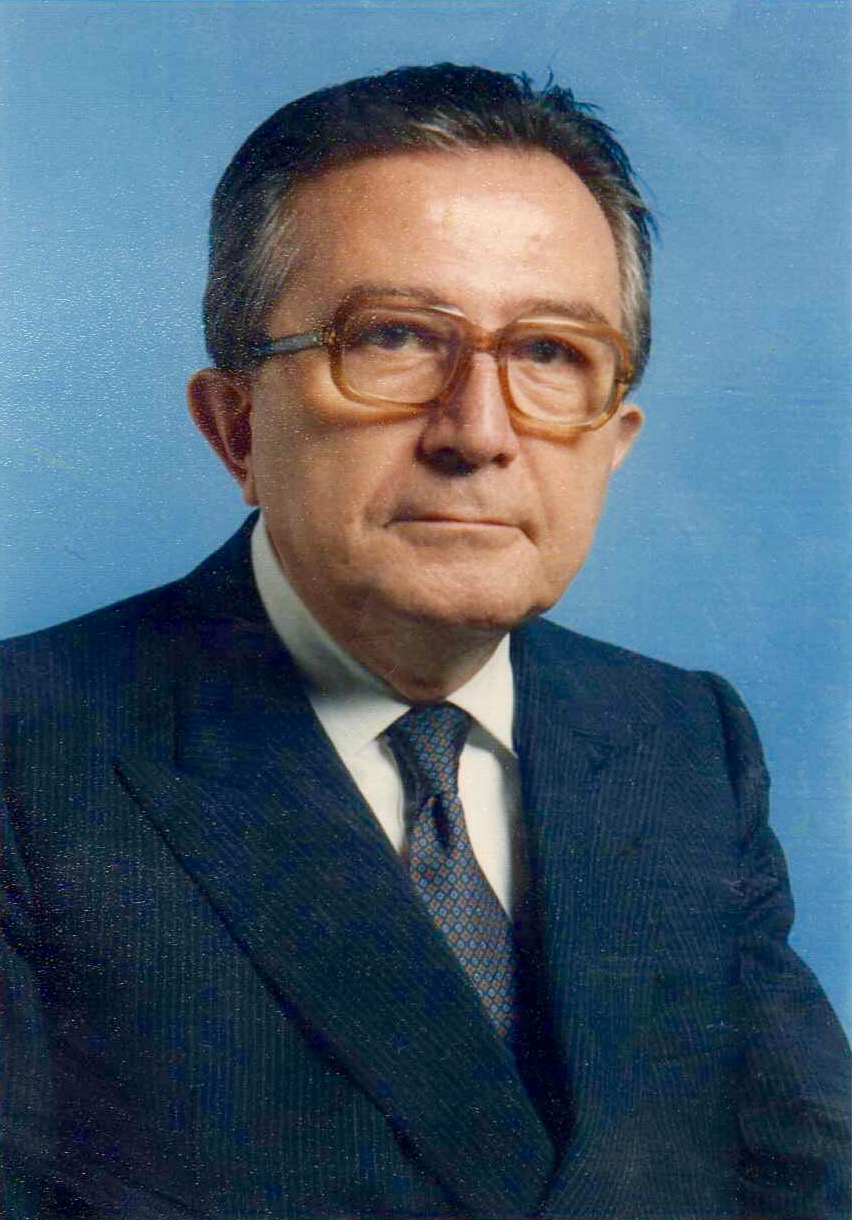
- Date formed: 22 July 1989
- Date dissolved: 12 April 1991

People and organisations
- Head of state: Francesco Cossiga
- Head of government: Giulio Andreotti
- Total no. of members: 30
- Member parties: DC, PSI, PSDI, PRI, PLI
- Status in legislature: Coalition government Pentapartito
- Opposition parties: PCI, MSI, PR, Greens, DP

History
- Legislature term: X Legislature (1987 – 1992)
- Predecessor: De Mita Cabinet
- Successor: Andreotti VII Cabinet

The Andreotti VI Cabinet was a cabinet of the Italian Republic. It held office from 1989 to 1991.

Andreotti was forced to resign after that the PRI left the majority. On 12 April 1991, he received once again the presidential mandate to form a new government.

== Party breakdown ==
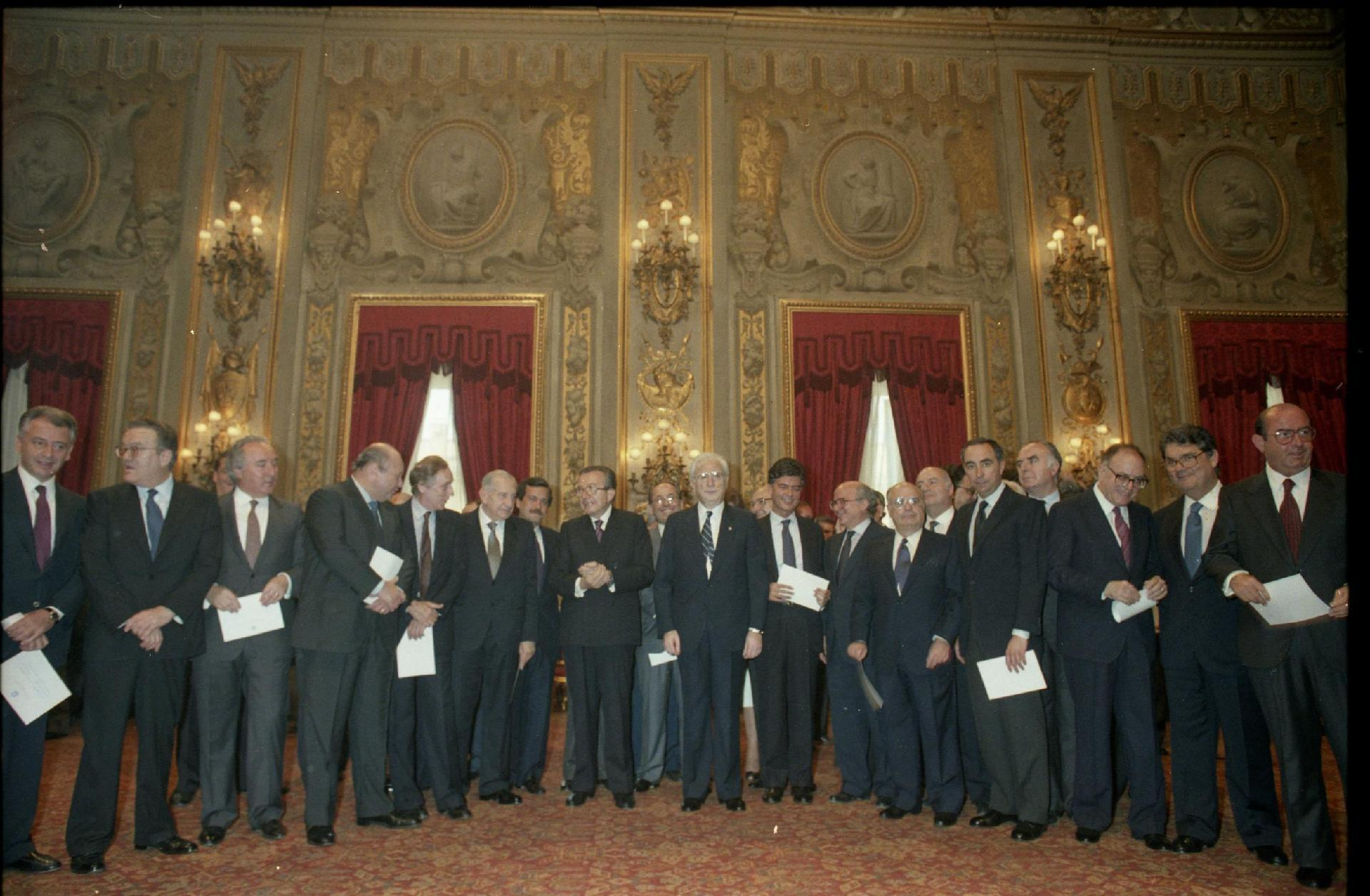
Official photo of the Andreotti's government after the oath at the Quirinal Palace

- Christian Democracy (DC): Prime Minister, 14 ministers, 35 undersecretaries
- Italian Socialist Party (PSI): Deputy Prime minister, 9 ministers, 19 undersecretaries
- Italian Republican Party (PRI): 3 ministers, 6 undersecretaries
- Italian Democratic Socialist Party (PSDI): 2 ministers, 4 undersecretaries
- Italian Liberal Party (PLI): 2 ministers, 4 undersecretaries

== Composition ==
Portfolio	Minister	Took office	Left office	Party
Prime Minister	Giulio Andreotti	22 July 1989	12 April 1991	DC
Deputy Prime Minister	Claudio Martelli	22 July 1989	12 April 1991	PSI
Minister of Foreign Affairs	Gianni De Michelis	22 July 1989	12 April 1991	PSI
Minister of the Interior	Antonio Gava	22 July 1989	16 October 1990	DC
Minister of the Interior	Vincenzo Scotti	16 October 1990	12 April 1991	DC
Minister of Grace and Justice	Giuliano Vassalli	22 July 1989	2 February 1991	PSI
Minister of Grace and Justice	Claudio Martelli (ad interim)	2 February 1991	12 April 1991	PSI
Minister of Budget and Economic Planning	Paolo Cirino Pomicino	22 July 1989	12 April 1991	DC
Minister of Finance	Rino Formica	22 July 1989	12 April 1991	PSI
Minister of Treasury	Guido Carli	22 July 1989	12 April 1991	DC
Minister of Defence	Mino Martinazzoli	22 July 1989	27 July 1990	DC
Minister of Defence	Virginio Rognoni	27 July 1990	12 April 1991	DC
Minister of Public Education	Sergio Mattarella	22 July 1989	27 July 1990	DC
Minister of Public Education	Gerardo Bianco	27 July 1990	12 April 1991	DC
Minister of Public Works	Giovanni Prandini	22 July 1989	12 April 1991	DC
Minister of Agriculture and Forests	Calogero Mannino	22 July 1989	27 July 1990	DC
Minister of Agriculture and Forests	Vito Saccomandi	27 July 1990	12 April 1991	DC
Minister of Transport	Carlo Bernini	22 July 1989	12 April 1991	DC
Minister of Post and Telecommunications	Oscar Mammì	22 July 1989	12 April 1991	PRI
Minister of Industry, Commerce and Craftsmanship	Adolfo Battaglia	22 July 1989	12 April 1991	PRI
Minister of Health	Francesco De Lorenzo	22 July 1989	12 April 1991	PLI
Minister of Foreign Trade	Renato Ruggiero	22 July 1989	12 April 1991	PSI
Minister of Merchant Navy	Carlo Vizzini	22 July 1989	12 April 1991	PSDI
Minister of State Holdings	Carlo Fracanzani	22 July 1989	27 July 1990	DC
Minister of State Holdings	Franco Piga	27 July 1990	26 December 1990	DC
Minister of State Holdings	Giulio Andreotti (ad interim)	26 December 1990	12 April 1991	DC
Minister of Labour and Social Security	Carlo Donat-Cattin	22 July 1989	18 March 1991	DC
Minister of Labour and Social Security	Rosa Russo Iervolino (ad interim)	18 March 1991	12 April 1991	DC
Minister of Cultural and Environmental Heritage	Ferdinando Facchiano	22 July 1989	12 April 1991	PSDI
Minister of Tourism and Entertainment	Franco Carraro	22 July 1989	6 February 1990	PSI
Minister of Tourism and Entertainment	Carlo Tognoli	6 February 1990	12 April 1991	PSI
Minister of the Environment	Giorgio Ruffolo	22 July 1989	12 April 1991	PSI
Minister of University and Scientific Research	Antonio Ruberti	22 July 1989	12 April 1991	PSI
Minister of Regional Affairs (without portfolio)	Antonio Maccanico	22 July 1989	12 April 1991	PRI
Minister for Social Affairs (without portfolio)	Rosa Russo Iervolino	22 July 1989	12 April 1991	DC
Minister for the Coordination of Community Policies (without portfolio)	Pier Luigi Romita	22 July 1989	12 April 1991	PSI
Minister for the Coordination of Civil Protection (without portfolio)	Vito Lattanzio	22 July 1989	12 April 1991	DC
Minister of Public Function (without portfolio)	Remo Gaspari	22 July 1989	12 April 1991	DC
Minister for Extraordinary Interventions in the South (without portfolio)	Riccardo Misasi	22 July 1989	26 July 1990	DC
Minister for Extraordinary Interventions in the South (without portfolio)	Giovanni Marongiu	26 July 1990	12 April 1991	DC
Minister for Urban Areas Problems (without portfolio)	Carmelo Conte	22 July 1989	12 April 1991	PSI
Minister for Parliamentary Relations (without portfolio)	Egidio Sterpa	22 July 1989	12 April 1991	PLI
Secretary of the Council of Ministers	Nino Cristofori	22 July 1989	12 April 1991	DC
