= Papello =

The Italian term papello (in Sicilian: Papeddu) indicates "a long and detailed paper note, a letter or a complaint" containing indications.

In Italian press since 2000s, the term is referred to the State-Mafia Pact occurred during 1990s. A copy of the papello was consigned to magistrates by Massimo Ciancimino through his lawyer, Francesca Russo, on 15 October 2009.

== Content ==
The will of Cosa Nostra, then commanded by Salvatore Riina, went through Vito Ciancimino with twelve requests to the Italian state contained indeed in the papello:

1. Revision of the Maxi Trial sentence;
2. Abrogation of Article 41-bis prison regime;
3. Revision of Rognoni-La Torre law (crime of "associazione di tipo mafioso", mafioso association);
4. Reform of the law about pentiti;
5. Recognition of dissociated benefits for mafia convicts;
6. House arrest for people older than 70 years;
7. Closure of "super-prisons";
8. Imprisonment near relatives houses;
9. No censorship on the relatives correspondences;
10. Prevention measure and relationship with relatives;
11. Arrest only in flagrante crime;
12. Tax exemption for gasoline in Sicily.

== See also ==
- State-Mafia Pact
