= Carmelo Conte =

Italian lawyer and politician (born 1938)

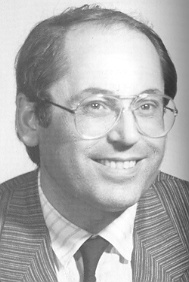

Minister for Urban Problems
- In office 22 July 1989 – 28 April 1993
- Prime Minister: Giulio Andreotti; Giuliano Amato

Member of the Chamber of Deputies
- In office 20 June 1979 – 14 April 1994
- Constituency: Benevento

Personal details
- Born: 9 November 1938 (age 87) Piaggine, Salerno
- Party: Italian Socialist Party
- Occupation: Lawyer

Carmelo Conte (born 1938) is an Italian retired lawyer and socialist politician who served as the minister for urban areas problems for three terms.

== Biography ==
Conte was born in Piaggine, Salerno, on 9 November 1938. He has a bachelor's degree in law. He was a member of the Italian Socialist Party. Conte was one of the close allies of Bettino Craxi, leader of the party.

Conte was first elected to the Italian Parliament in 1979 for the Italian Socialist Party from Benevento. He served in the Parliament for three more terms until 1994. Patrick McCarthy, an American scholar, argues that Conte created a nepotic network in his election region based in Salerno like other leading socialist politicians of the period.

Conte was appointed minister without portfolio for urban problems on 22 July 1989 to the sixth cabinet of Giulio Andreotti. He also held the post in the next cabinet of Giulio Andreotti and in the first cabinet of Giuliano Amato. Conte's term ended on 28 April 1993.

Conte has been the author of several books last of which was published in 2019.
