= Giovanni Conso =

Italian politician (1922–2015)

Giovanni Conso OMRI
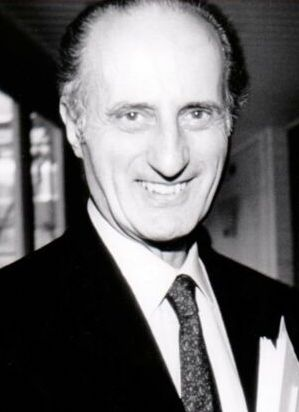

Minister of Justice
- In office 12 February 1993 – 10 May 1994
- Prime Minister: Giuliano Amato; Carlo Azeglio Ciampi
- Preceded by: Claudio Martelli
- Succeeded by: Alfredo Biondi

President of the Constitutional Court of Italy
- In office 23 October 1990 – 3 February 1991
- Preceded by: Francesco Saja
- Succeeded by: Ettore Gallo

Personal details
- Born: 23 March 1922 Turin, Italy
- Died: 2 August 2015 (aged 93) Rome, Italy
- Party: Independent
- Education: University of Turin

Giovanni Battista Conso (23 March 1922 – 2 August 2015) was an Italian jurist who served on the Constitutional Court of Italy for nine years beginning in 1982, and served as President of the Accademia dei Lincei from 1989 until his death in 2015.

Conso was the Minister of Justice in the Amato I Cabinet and in the Ciampi Cabinet between 1993 and 1994. He was also vice-president of the Italian Society for International Organizations. He died in Rome in 2015.

== Academic and judicial activity ==
Graduated in law in Turin in 1945, and he was a pupil of Francesco Antolisei. Lawyer, and university professor, he taught criminal procedure in the law faculties of the Universities of Genoa, Urbino, Turin, of the Sapienza University of Rome and of the LUMSA of Rome. He was emeritus professor of Criminal Procedure at the University of Turin.

From 1974 to 1976 he was vice president of the commission led by Gian Domenico Pisapia at the Ministry of Grace and Justice which drafted a draft code of criminal procedure that never came to approval. Part of the content of this text is transferred to the criminal procedure code drawn up between 1987 and 1988 by a second commission chaired by Pisapia. The new code came into force in 1989 and is still in force, albeit significantly modified.

A "lay" member (because he was elected by parliament in joint session) of the High Council of the Judiciary from 1976 to 1981, he was its vice-president during the last months of his mandate following the resignation of Ugo Zilletti. Appointed constitutional judge by the President of the Italian Republic Sandro Pertini on January 25, 1982, he swears on February 3, 1982. He was elected President of the Italian Constitutional Court on October 18, 1990, exercising his functions since October 23, 1990. He left office due to the expiry of his mandate on February 3, 1991.

== Politics ==
He was the official candidate of the Democratic Party of the Left in the fourteenth ballot of the 1992 Italian presidential election. He served as Minister of Grace and Justice from 12 February 1993 to 9 May 1994, as an expression of the Catholic area but without belonging to any political party. He was appointed Minister in place of Claudio Martelli in the Amato I Cabinet, and was reconfirmed in the subsequent Ciampi government.

The first important measure of Giovanni Conso, taken on 21 February 1993, at the suggestion of the Minister of the Interior Nicola Mancino, was the revocation of a decree of his predecessor who had introduced the article 41-bis in Neapolitan prisons. In an interview with the journalist Sandro Ruotolo in 2018, the then director of the Department of Prison Administration Nicolò Amato, speaking of this provision, states that he opened a door through which the State-Mafia Pact passed.

== Honours ==
- Italy : Knight Grand Cross of the Order of Merit of the Italian Republic – 5 February 1982
- Italy : Italian Medal of Merit for Culture and Art – 2 June 1984
