= Gioacchino La Barbera =

Member of the Sicilian Mafia

- Born: November 1959 (age 66–67); Altofonte, Province of Palermo, Sicily, Italy
- Status: Pentito (turncoat)
- Known for: Testifying against Mafia bosses, including Giovanni Brusca
- Father: Girolamo La Barbera (father, murdered in 1994)
- Convictions: Murder of Salvo Lima, Participation in Giovanni Falcone's assassination
- Penalty: Life sentence (for the murder of his father); 13 years (for involvement in Mafia crimes)

Gioacchino La Barbera (born November 1959 in Altofonte) is a member of the Mafia who became a pentito. He was one of the key witnesses in the trial against the killers of Antimafia judge Giovanni Falcone.

La Barbera was born in Altofonte, in the province of Palermo. In 1981, he was initiated into the Altofonte cosca and, in 1986, he became the regent of the Altofonte Mafia family after the arrest of Bernardo Brusca.

After the arrest of Mafia boss Totò Riina in January 1993, the remaining bosses, among them La Barbera, Giuseppe Graviano, Matteo Messina Denaro, Giovanni Brusca, Leoluca Bagarella, and Antonino Gioè, came together a few times (often in the Santa Flavia area in Bagheria, on an estate owned by the mafioso Leonardo Greco). They decided on a strategy to force the Italian state to retreat. That resulted in a series of bomb attacks in 1993 in the Via dei Georgofili in Florence, in Via Palestro in Milan and in the Piazza San Giovanni in Laterano, and Via San Teodoro in Rome, which left 10 people dead and 93 injured as well as damage to centres of cultural heritage such as the Uffizi Gallery.

On 23 March 1993, La Barbera, Antonino Gioè and Salvatore Bentivegna were arrested in Palermo. The police taped them while they were planning bomb attacks. La Barbera started to collaborate with the authorities in November 1993.

La Barbera confessed his participation in the slaying of Antimafia judge Giovanni Falcone. He followed Falcone's car as it sped toward Palermo, keeping in constant touch with Leoluca Bagarella, Antonino Gioè and Giovanni Brusca on the hillside near Capaci. Brusca set off the explosion.

He also admitted to having been involved in the killing of Salvo Lima, the former mayor of Palermo.

His father Girolamo La Barbera (born in 1925) was murdered on 10 June 1994, because he defended the choice of his son to become a pentito. The killing was staged as a suicide. Among the killers were Michele Traina and Domenico Raccuglia. The order came from Giovanni Brusca. Traina and Raccuglia received life sentences for the killing in June 2005, while Brusca was sentenced to 13 years.

In October 1997, the pentito La Barbera was rearrested. Although a key witness in several important trials underway, he had returned home and recommenced his criminal activities and avenged atrocities carried out on family members.
