= White Uno Gang =

Criminal gang in Emilia-Romagna, Italy

- Banda della Uno bianca
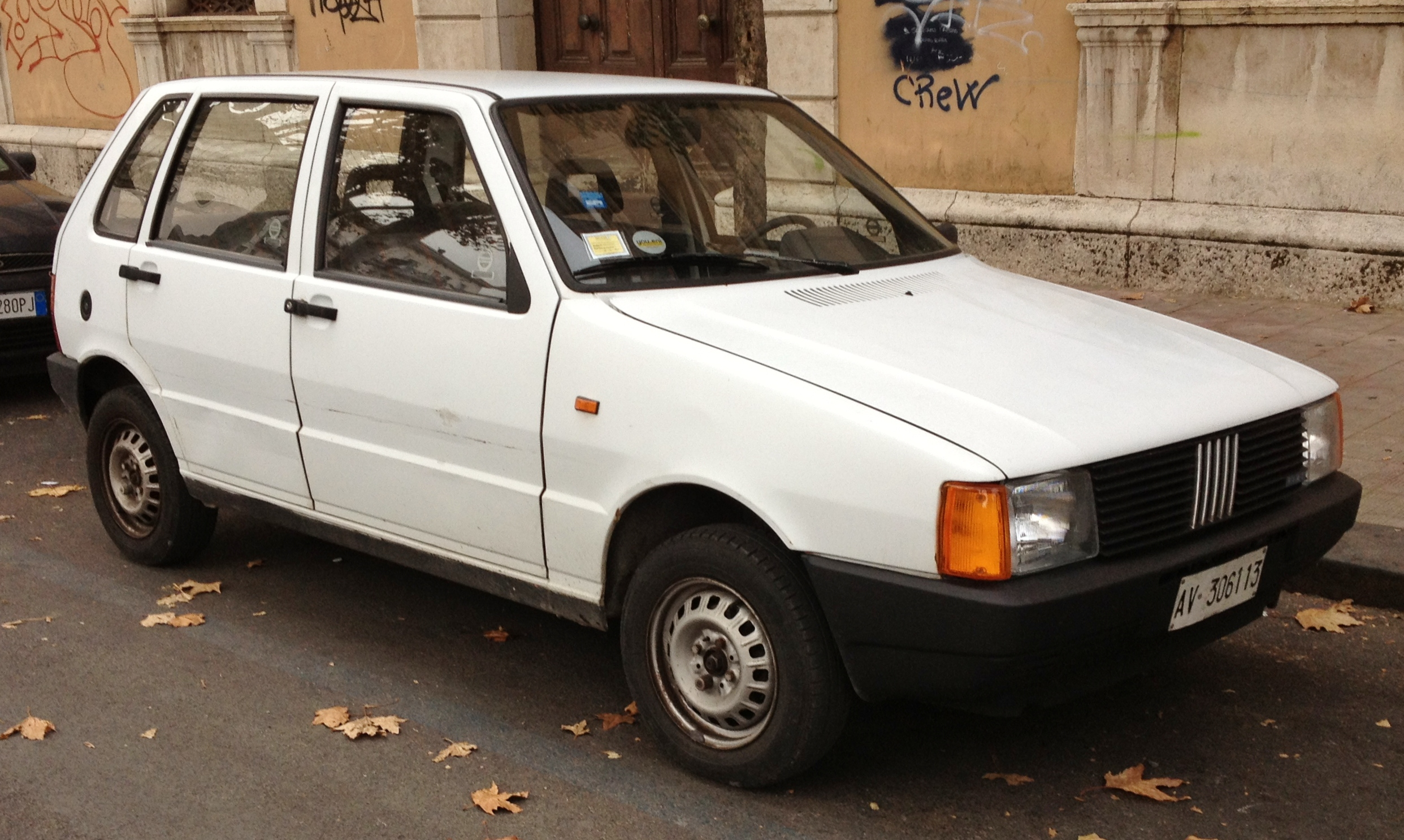
- A white Fiat Uno
- Founded: 1987
- Founders: Roberto, Fabio and Alberto Savi
- Founding location: Forlì, Emilia-Romagna
- Years active: 1987–1994
- Territory: Bologna, Forlì, Ravenna, Pesaro and Ancona provinces
- Ethnicity: Italian
- Leader: Roberto Savi
- Activities: armed robbery, bank robbery, extortion, murder, ethnic terrorism

The White Uno Gang (Italian: Banda della Uno bianca) was an Italian criminal organization operating mainly in Emilia-Romagna and Marche.

The name of the gang was coined by the press in 1991 as the gang frequently used a white Fiat Uno car, being particularly easy to steal and difficult to identify given its widespread usage in Italy at the time.

Between 1987 and 1994, the gang pulled off 102 heists, mostly armed robberies, causing 24 deaths and 102 injuries.

== History ==
The gang, most of whom were serving police officers with links to right wing extremism, began activity in 1987 with a string of night robberies at tollbooths along the Autostrada A14. On 19 June 1987, the gang raided the tollbooth at Pesaro, using a Fiat Regata with false license plates owned by gang member Alberto Savi; the loot amounted to about 1,300,000 lire. They went on to raid a further twelve tollbooths in the next two months.

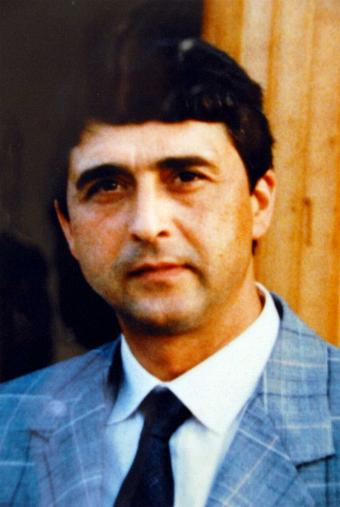
Police officer Antonio Mosca, the first victim of the gang

In October 1987, they attempted to extort Rimini trader Savino Grossi. Grossi had been receiving extortion threats for some time, and informed the police, who organised a sting operation. On 3 October 1987, following instructions from the gang, he drove along the A14, with a police officer hiding in his luggage rack, and others following a short distance behind. He stopped at a flyover just before the tollbooth near Cesena, where he was supposed to deposit a briefcase containing 1,500,000 lire. With the intervention of the police, a gunfight broke out in which superintendent Antonio Mosca was seriously injured, he died on 29 July 1989 as a result of his injuries. The gang managed to escape without being apprehended.

The operation was attended by inspector Luciano Baglioni whose investigations in 1994, together with inspector Pietro Costanza, would allow to discover the identities of the gang. The murder of Antonio Mosca would be the first in a series committed by the gang.

In early 1988, the gang killed two security guards and wounded another during supermarket raids; Giampiero Picello on 30 January 1988 in Rimini, and Carlo Beccari on 19 February 1988 in Casalecchio di Reno. Francesco Cataldi, a colleague of Beccari, was also wounded during this robbery.

On 20 April 1988, two carabinieri, Cataldo Stasi and Umberto Erriu, were killed after they stopped the gang at a car park in Castel Maggiore, near Bologna. Carabiniere Domenico Macauda was subsequently found to have intentionally misdirected the investigation and manipulated evidence, he was convicted to eight years in prison.

In 1989, Adolfino Alessandri, a 52-year-old eyewitness, was shot dead during a supermarket robbery in the Corticella neighbourhood of Bologna.

In 1990, the White Uno Gang killed a total of six people. On 15 January 1990, pensioner Giancarlo Armorati was seriously injured during a post office robbery, which injured 55 others, in Via Mazzini in Bologna. He died a year later from his injuries. On 6 October 1990, street cleaner Primo Zecchi was killed after writing down the criminals' license plate number.

On 23 December 1990, the gang opened fire on Romani caravans in Via Gobetti, Bologna killing Rodolfo Bellinati and Patrizia Della Santina, and injuring others. On 27 December 1990, 50-year-old Luigi Pasqui was killed in a robbery at a Castel Maggiore petrol station while trying to raise the alarm; a few minutes later the gang killed Paride Pedini, who had approached the white Uno they had just abandoned.

=== The Pilastro massacre ===
On 4 January 1991, at around 10pm, in the Pilastro district of Bologna, the White Uno Gang opened fire on a patrol group of carabinieri, killing three. The victims were Otello Stefanini, Andrea Moneta, and Mauro Mitilini. The gang were in Pilastro by chance as they had been on their way to San Lazzaro di Savena looking for a car to steal. In Via Casini the gang's car was overtaken by the patrol; which was interpreted as an attempt to record the license plate. Driving alongside, gang leader Roberto Savi fired at Stefanini who was driving. The carabinieri tried to escape but crashed into rubbish bins, shortly after the car was hit by a shower of bullets. Andrea Moneta and Mauro Mitilini, managed to respond, injuring Roberto Savi, but were eventually overwhelmed by the gang.

The gang took the patrol service paper and fled the site of the conflict. The white Uno involved in the massacre was abandoned in San Lazzaro di Savena in the car park of Via Gramsci and burned; one of the seats was stained with Savi's blood. The massacre was immediately claimed by the terrorist group Falange Armata.

The massacre remained unsolved until the gang confessed during the trial on 25 January 1995. The investigators followed incorrect leads, with disparity between the carabinieri and state police investigations, which led them to indict suspects unrelated to the crime. The carabinieri believed that the gang led by ex-carabiniere paratrooper Damiano Bechis was responsible, to which various robberies in Emilia-Romagna and Tuscany had been attributed, including the murder of Primo Zecchi. Due to the nature of the crimes they believed the gang must have had links to the military or law enforcement. While on 20 June 1992, the DIGOS, on the basis of a false testimony from alleged eyewitness Simonetta Bersani, arrested brothers Peter and William Santagata, as well as camorrista Marco Medda

=== 1991–1994 ===
In 1991 the White Uno Gang committed a number of murders. On 20 April 1991, the gang killed Claudio Bonfiglioli during a robbery at his petrol station in Borgo Panigale.

On 2 May 1991, during a raid on a gun shop in Bologna they killed shop-owner Licia Ansaloni and retired carabiniere Pietro Capolungo. During the robbery a woman saw Roberto Savi outside the shop, and later provided an identikit to the investigators. This was shown to Ansaloni's husband who admitted it closely resembled Savi who was a regular customer. However, the investigators failed to connect Savi to the blood evidence.

On 19 June 1991, Graziano Mirri was killed in front of his wife during a robbery at his petrol station in Viale Marconi, Cesena.

On 18 August 1991, the gang killed two Senegalese labourers, Ndiaj Malik and Babou Chejkh, and injured a third, Madiaw Draw, in a racist attack in San Mauro Mare. Shortly after, the gang fired shots at a group of young men Fiat Ritmo.

In 1992 there were no recorded murders, but the gang committed four bank robberies and another in a supermarket.

On 24 February 1993, 21-year-old Massimiliano Valenti was killed after witnessing the gang change vehicles during a bank robbery. The gang kidnapped the young man and then transported him to an isolated area where he was executed. His body was found in a ditch in the municipality of Zola Predosa.

On 7 October 1993, the gang killed electrician Carlo Poli in the Riale neighbourhood of Zola Predosa.

In 1994 the gang intensified its criminal activity towards banks, robbing a total of 9 during the year. On 24 May 1991, the director of the Cassa di Risparmio di Pesaro bank, Ubaldo Paci, was shot dead while he was opening the branch.

On the evening of 21 November 1994, then assistant chief of police, Roberto Savi was arrested while on duty. Three days later, his brother Fabio was arrested at an Autogrill 27 kilometres from the Austrian border with his Romanian lover Eva Mikula. Later, the state police arrested the other members of the gang.

== Members ==
=== Roberto Savi ===
Known as the Monk (Italian: il monaco) for his silent character, Roberto Savi was the first of the gang to be arrested. He was born in Forlì on 19 May 1954 and, together with his brother Alberto, was a member of the Polizia di Stato at the police headquarters in Bologna. At the time of his arrest he held the rank of assistant chief and worked in the operations centre.

As a young man he was an activist in the far-right Fronte della Gioventù.

In 1976, at the age of 22, Savi entered the police force and took service in Bologna. He was transferred to the operations centre in 1992 for disciplinary reasons, after shaving the head of a young boy found in possession of narcotic substances.

During the trial, his wife, who was aware of his criminal activities but was too scared to report them, described him as a strange and aggressive man with a taciturn and reticent character, who didn’t spend much time with people apart from his brothers and spent much of his time playing video games. He had threatened her with a pistol on a number of occasions.

Savi's blunt coldness shocked the audience as he described the most atrocious crimes he committed; when answering questions in the courtroom, he would respond with "affirmative" or "negative".

Roberto Savi was sentenced to life imprisonment. On 1 October 2008 he remarried a Dutch inmate in Monza prison.

=== Fabio Savi ===
Known as "the tall one" (In Italian: il lungo), Fabio was the co-founder of the gang. Born in Forlì on 22 April 1960, like his brothers he also applied to join the police, but issues with his eyesight prevented him. He was reportedly arrogant and aggressive and had a bad temper.

He worked as a coachbuilder and truck driver, living in Torriana with his Romanian girlfriend, Eva Mikula, whose testimony was decisive in the resolution of the case.

Together with Roberto, he was involved in all of the gang’s crimes. Fabio was arrested a few days after his brother while trying to leave the country. After being sentenced to life imprisonment, he was transferred to Sollicciano Prison in Florence, and later to Fossombrone.

=== Alberto Savi ===
Born in Cesena on 19 February 1965, Alberto is the younger brother of Roberto and Fabio. At the time of his arrest on 26 November 1995, Alberto was a serving officer in the Rimini police force. He was reportedly weak-willed and easily influenced by his older brothers.

Alberto Savi was sentenced to life imprisonment. On 23 October 2010, he asked to be released after 16 years in prison. In February 2017, he was granted permission to leave prison for 12 hours to see his mother who was gravely ill. Since 2019 he has been given similar permissions for the Christmas holiday.

=== Pietro Gugliotta ===
Born in Catania in 1960, Pietro did not take part in any murders. Also a police officer, he worked as a radio operator at the police headquarters in Bologna together with Roberto Savi. Pietro Gugliotta was sentenced to 18 years imprisonment, he was released in 2008. He died by suicide on January 8, 2026, at the age of 66, but the news of his death was revealed only four months later.

=== Marino Occhipinti ===
Born in Santa Sofia, 25 February 1965 Occhipinti was a minor member of the gang. He took part in an assault in Casalecchio di Reno on 19 February 1988, during which security guard Carlo Beccari died, he was therefore sentenced to life imprisonment.

Occhipinti was released on 2 July 2018, in an interview he apologised to Beccari's family. On 28 March 2022, he was arrested for beating his partner and has returned to prison.

=== Luca Vallicelli ===
At the time of his arrest on 29 November 1994, Luca Vallicelli was a police officer in the Polizia stradale in Cesena. A minor member of the gang, he only participated in the first robberies, in which no one was killed. He pled guilty and was sentenced to three years and eight months.

The Savi brothers' father, Giuliano Savi, committed suicide on 29 March 1998, swallowing seven boxes of Lorazepam in a white Uno parked at Villa Verucchio, 13 kilometres from Rimini.
