= Lia Quartapelle =

Italian politician (born 1982)

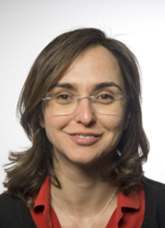
- Lia Quartapelle in 2018

Member of the Chamber of Deputies
- Incumbent
- Assumed office 15 March 2013

Personal details
- Born: Lia Quartapelle Procopio; 15 August 1982 (age 43) Varese, Italy
- Party: Democratic Party
- Spouse: Claudio Martelli (m. 2022)
- Education: University of Pavia
- Profession: Politician, academic

Lia Quartapelle (born 15 August 1982) is an Italian politician of the Democratic Party (PD).

== Early life and career ==
Quartapelle graduated as an economics major from the University of Pavia and in 2007, she worked for a year as an economist with the Italian Development Cooperation in Mozambique, supporting the Mozambican government under Prime Minister Luísa Diogo in setting their development policies.

== Member of Parliament, 2013–present ==
Quartapelle was elected Deputy in the 2013 national elections. In parliament, Quartapelle serves on the Committee on Foreign and European Community Affairs, the Sub-Committee on Human Rights, the Sub-Committee on Sustainable Development, and the Sub-Committee on Africa and Global Affairs. She is also her parliamentary group's spokesperson on foreign policy.

In addition to her committee assignments, Quartapelle has been a member of the Italian delegation to the Parliamentary Assembly of the Council of Europe since 2015. She currently serves on the Committee on Political Affairs and Democracy.

By 2014, Quartapelle was widely mentioned as a possible replacement for Federica Mogherini as Minister of Foreign Affairs in the government of Prime Minister Matteo Renzi.

In January 2016, Quartapelle was among a group of MPs who collected 118 signatures for a petition nominating the Afghan Cycling Federation women's team for the Nobel Peace Prize.

Quartapelle was one of Renzi's supporters in his plan to reform the Italian electoral law in 2016.

== Other activities ==
- European Council on Foreign Relations (ECFR), Member of the Council
- Association of European Parliamentarians with Africa (AWEPA), Head of the Italian Section
- Parliamentarians for Global Action (PGA), President of the Italian Chapter
- Trilateral Commission, 2015 David Rockefeller Fellow
- UNITE – Parliamentary Network to End HIV/AIDS, Viral Hepatitis and Other Infectious Diseases, Member (since 2019)
- Women in International Security (WIIS), President of the Italian Chapter

== Political positions ==
In a joint letter initiated by Norbert Röttgen and Anthony Gonzalez ahead of the 47th G7 summit in 2021, Quartapelle joined some 70 legislators from Europe and the US in calling upon their leaders to take a tough stance on China and to "avoid becoming dependent" on the country for technology including artificial intelligence and 5G.
