= Adolfo Battaglia =

Italian journalist and politician (1930–2026)

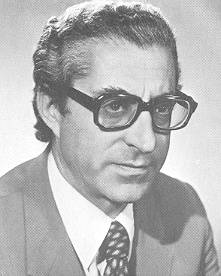

Minister of Industry, Commerce and Craftsmanship
- In office 29 July 1987 – 13 April 1991
- Prime Minister: Giovanni Goria; Ciriaco De Mita; Giulio Andreotti
- Preceded by: Franco Piga
- Succeeded by: Guido Bodrato

Member of the Chamber of Deputies
- In office 25 May 1972 – 14 April 1994
- Constituency: Verona

Personal details
- Born: 10 February 1930 Viterbo, Italy
- Died: 18 June 2026 (aged 96) Rome, Italy
- Party: PRI (1965–1994); PDS (1994–1998)
- Education: Sapienza University of Rome
- Profession: Journalist

Adolfo Battaglia (10 February 1930 – 18 June 2026) was an Italian journalist and politician who served as the minister of industry, commerce and craftsmanship between 1987 and 1991 in three successive cabinets. He was a long-term member of the Chamber of Deputies.

== Life and career ==
Born in Viterbo on 10 February 1930, Battaglia obtained a bachelor's degree in law in Rome in 1953. In 1965 he joined the Italian Republican Party (PRI), serving as a member of the party's national directorate and then its deputy political secretary. Within the party Battaglia was part of the pro-socialist faction.

Battaglia served as a deputy for six terms between the legislatures VI and XI. He was first elected to the Chamber of Deputies in 1972 for the PRI. In the 1980s he was the parliamentary leader of the party. He also worked as an undersecretary for foreign affairs for two terms.

He was the minister of industry, commerce and craftsmanship in the cabinets of Goria, De Mita and Andreotti. In 1991 he was appointed minister of state holdings to the cabinet led by Giulio Andreotti, but like the other designated ministers from the PRI Battaglia did not take an oath due to the veto by the Italian Socialist Party on the appointment of Giuseppe Galasso to the Ministry of Telecommunications. He left the PRI in 1994 and joined the Democratic Party of the Left (PDS) of which he was a member of the national directorate before he retired from politics.

Battaglia worked as a journalist from 1958 and contributed to many publications, including Il Mondo, Panorama, La Stampa, Corriere della Sera, Il Giorno and Il Messaggero. He was the director of La Voce Repubblicana newspaper from 1967 to 1972.

Battaglia died on 18 June 2026, at the age of 96.
