= Calogero Mannino =

Italian politician and lawyer (born 1939)

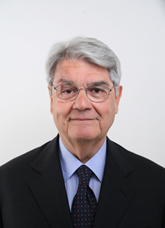
Calogero Mannino in 2008

Calogero Antonio Mannino (born August 20, 1939) is an Italian politician and lawyer. He has been a member of the Christian Democracy and the Union of Christian and Centre Democrats. He served in the cabinet of Prime Ministers Spadolini (1981–1982), Fanfani (1982–1983) and Andreotti (1991–1992). He was also member of the Chamber of Deputies of Italy in Legislature VII (1976–1979), Legislature VIII (1979–1983), Legislature IX (1983–1987), Legislature X (1987–1992), Legislature XI (1992–1994) and Legislature XVI and member of the Senate in Legislature XV.

He was accused to have been involved with the State-Mafia Pact as an active part in negotiating the end of the early 1990s massacres in return for detention measures attenuation to mafia members. In 2015, the first verdict was an acquittal. In 2017, the prosecuting authority gave impulse to the process in second grade.

== Biography ==
Calogero Mannino, also known as "Lillo", originally from Sciacca, was born in Asmara and moved from a young age to Palermo to support his university studies. He enrolled in the Faculty of Law of Palermo and graduated 1961. Subsequently he continued his studies also graduating in Political Science.

Member of the Christian Democracy, in 1971 he was elected deputy to the Sicilian Regional Assembly and, in July of the same year, he became regional assessor of finance, remaining in office until February 1976. In 1976 he was elected national deputy in the western Sicily constituency, and was re-elected also in 1979, 1983, 1987 and 1992. In 1979 he was elected vice president of the Christian Democratic Parliamentary Group in the Chamber of Deputies. In July 1980 he was appointed undersecretary of the treasury in the Forlani Cabinet. That year he was appointed commissioner of the Sicilian DC by Ciriaco De Mita.

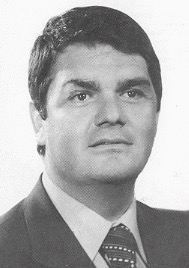
Calogero Mannino in the 70s

Mannino served as minister several times: in July 1981 he was appointed minister of the merchant navy in the Spadolini I Cabinet; in December 1982 he became minister of agriculture and forestry in the Fanfani V Cabinet, remaining in office until July 1983. In 1987 he served as minister of transport in the Goria Cabinet; in March 1988, he was appointed minister for agriculture in the De Mita Cabinet and subsequently confirmed in the Andreotti VI Cabinet, but in July 1990, together with Sergio Mattarella and other fellow ministers, resigned for dissent in with respect to the "Mammì Law" on television broadcasting. However, he returned to the government, together with Martinazzoli and Misasi, who also resigned, in February 1991, in the Andreotti VI Cabinet, in which was appointed minister for extraordinary interventions in the South.

He was not re-elected in the 1994 general election, where he was candidate to the Senate with the civic list "Democratic Shield". After twelve years of absence from political life, he joined the UDC and in 2006 and was elected senator in the Sicily constituency, while in the 2008 general election he was elected to the Chamber of Deputies in the Sicily 1 constituency.

In September 2010, together with the southern deputies Francesco Saverio Romano, Giuseppe Drago, Giuseppe Ruvolo and Michele Pisacane, he abandoned the UDC and founded with them The Populars of Italy Tomorrow (PID). The 5 deputies therefore abandoned the opposition role, for which they were elected to the UDC, and take sides in support of the centre-right parliamentary majority of Silvio Berlusconi; as a first act they vote trust in the government. Mannino took over the presidency of the PID, while Romano became the national coordinator.

On 14 March 2011 Calogero Mannino announced the abandonment of the party and on 14 October 2011, he said that he would never again vote for confidence in the Berlusconi government. On 8 November 2011, he was one of the deputies of the majority who didn't vote on the 2010 General State Report, leading to the crisis of the Berlusconi government.
