= Castello Utveggio =

Building in Palermo

Coordinates: 38°09′07″N 13°21′20″E

The Castello Utveggio is a monumental palace built between 1928 and 1933 on a promontory of Mount Pellegrino overlooking Palermo, Sicily. It was built in a Neogothic style resembling a castle with crenellated rooflines.

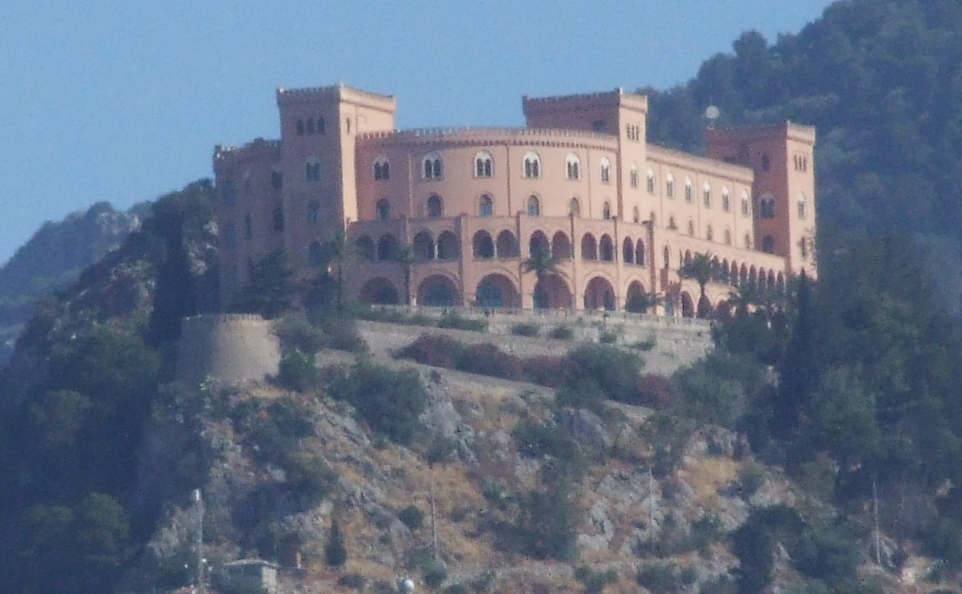
View of the Castle from the South

== History ==
The building was commissioned by Cavaliere Michele Utveggio and designed by Giovanni Battista Santangelo. Viewed as a fancy or folly building, the residence soon became a luxury hotel known as the Grand Hotel Utveggio. It was closed during the Second World War. In 1984, Sicily's regional government bought and refurbished the structure to install a business management school under the direction of CERISDI, the centro ricerche e studi direzionali, which closed in 2016. In January 2024 Sicily's regional council approved an expenditure of €5,900,000 for refitting the structure as a conference center.
