= Via D'Amelio bombing =

1992 Mafia killing in Palermo, Italy

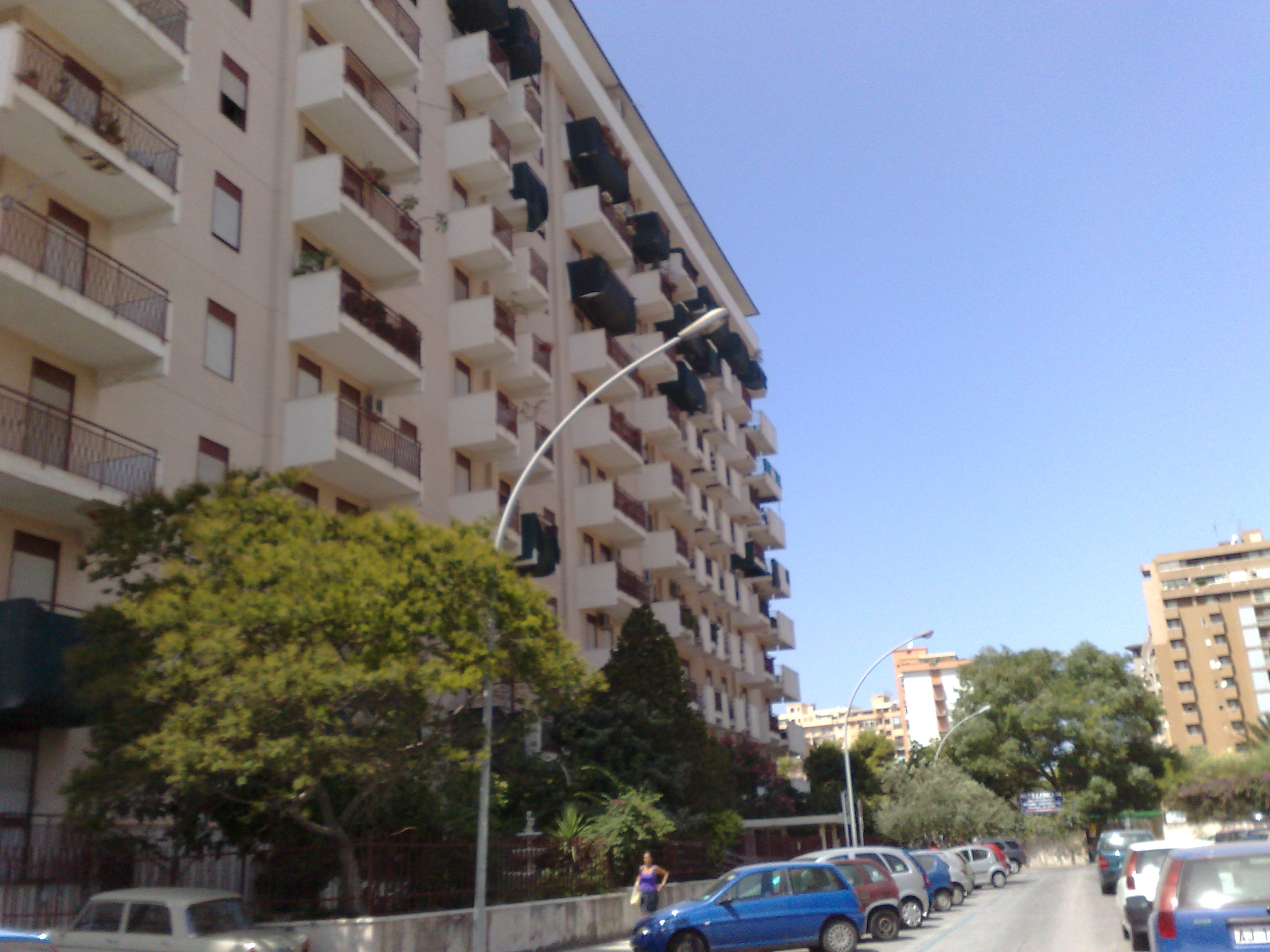
- The buildings where Paolo Borsellino's mother lived. The bomb exploded while he was walking to the entrance gate.
- Location: 38°08′35″N 13°21′17″E; Palermo, Sicily, Italy
- Date: 19 July 1992; 34 years ago 4:58 PM
- Target: Paolo Borsellino
- Attack type: Assassination
- Weapon: Car bomb
- Deaths: 6

The via D'Amelio bombing (Italian: Strage di via D'Amelio) was a terrorist attack by the Sicilian Mafia, which took place in Palermo, Sicily, Italy, on 19 July 1992. It killed Paolo Borsellino, the anti-Mafia Italian magistrate, and five members of his police escort: Agostino Catalano, Emanuela Loi (the first Italian female member of a police escort and the first to be killed on duty), Vincenzo Li Muli, Walter Eddie Cosina, and Claudio Traina.

The so-called agenda rossa, the red notebook in which Borsellino used to write down details of his investigations and which he always carried with him, disappeared from the site in the moments after the explosion. A carabinieri officer who was present when the explosion occurred reported he had delivered the notebook to Giuseppe Ayala, the first Palermo magistrate to arrive at the scene. Ayala, who said he had refused to receive it, was later criticized for saying escorts to anti-mafia judges should be reduced, despite evidence of further failed attempts to kill them in subsequent years.

== Bombing ==
The bombing occurred at 16:58 on 19 July 1992, 57 days after the Capaci bombing, in which Borsellino's friend, anti-mafia magistrate Giovanni Falcone, had been killed with his wife and police escort. The only survivor of Borsellino's escort in the bombing, Antonino Vullo, said the judge had stayed in his summer residence outside Palermo from 13:30 to around 16:00, when he and the escort drove to Via D'Amelio in the Sicilian capital, where he was to meet his mother. When they arrived, Vullo and the other agents noticed nothing unusual except some parked cars. The car in which Borsellino had been travelling exploded, along with one of the escort cars, while Vullo was sitting in a third car.

The bomb, containing some 100 kilograms (220 lb) of TNT, had been placed in a Fiat 126. Normal procedure when Borsellino travelled was to clear the road of cars before his arrival, but this was not allowed by the administration of the comune of Palermo, as reported by another anti-mafia judge, Antonino Caponnetto. Gaspare Spatuzza, a mafioso who later became a pentito, eventually revealed he had stolen the Fiat 126 on the orders of the Graviano and Brancaccio mafia clans.

The bloodbath provoked outrage. The night after, protesters peacefully besieged the prefecture of Palermo. Borsellino's funeral saw vehement protests by the crowd against the participants; the national police chief, Arturo Parisi, was struck while trying to escape. A few days later, questore (local police commander) Vito Plantone and prefetto Mario Jovine were transferred. The chief prosecutor of Palermo, Pietro Giammanco, resigned. Meanwhile, 7,000 soldiers were sent to Sicily to patrol roads and possible locations for attacks.

== Aftermath ==
Borsellino used to carry a red notebook, the so-called agenda rossa, in which he wrote down details of his investigations before making an official record in judicial reports. His colleagues were not given access to the agenda rossa.

Carabinieri officer Rosario Farinella said later that, after recovering the agenda rossa from the car, he gave it to Ayala. Ayala said he was staying in a hotel nearby and rushed to the place after hearing the explosion. He initially stumbled on the corpse of Borsellino without recognizing it, as the body of the dead judge was limbless. Ayala said "an officer in uniform" had offered him the notebook, but that he had refused it because he lacked authority. Carabinieri captain Arcangioli said he was not wearing uniform at the scene. In September 2005, Ayala changed his version, saying he took the agenda rossa while exploring the destroyed car and later gave it to a carabinieri officer who was there. Ayala's subsequent statements speak of an agent alternately in uniform and not in uniform.

On 1 July 1992 Borsellino had held a meeting with Nicola Mancino, who at the time had just been appointed Minister of the Interior. Details of the meeting have never been disclosed, but it is likely that Borsellino had annotated them in his agenda. Mancino, however, always denied having met Borsellino. In a televised interview on 24 July 2009, Ayala said, "Mancino himself told me that he had met Borsellino on 1 July 1992. Moreover, Mancino showed me his appointments book, with the name of Borsellino on it." Ayala repudiated this account in an interview in Sette magazine. A video showing Arcangioli holding the agenda rossa while inspecting the bombing area was aired in news on Italian state channel Rai 1 in 2006.

A personal diary in the possession of Borsellino's family has an annotation by the judge that reads: "1 July h 19:30 : Mancino". Vittorio Aliquò, another magistrate, later said he had accompanied Borsellino "up to the threshold of the minister's office".

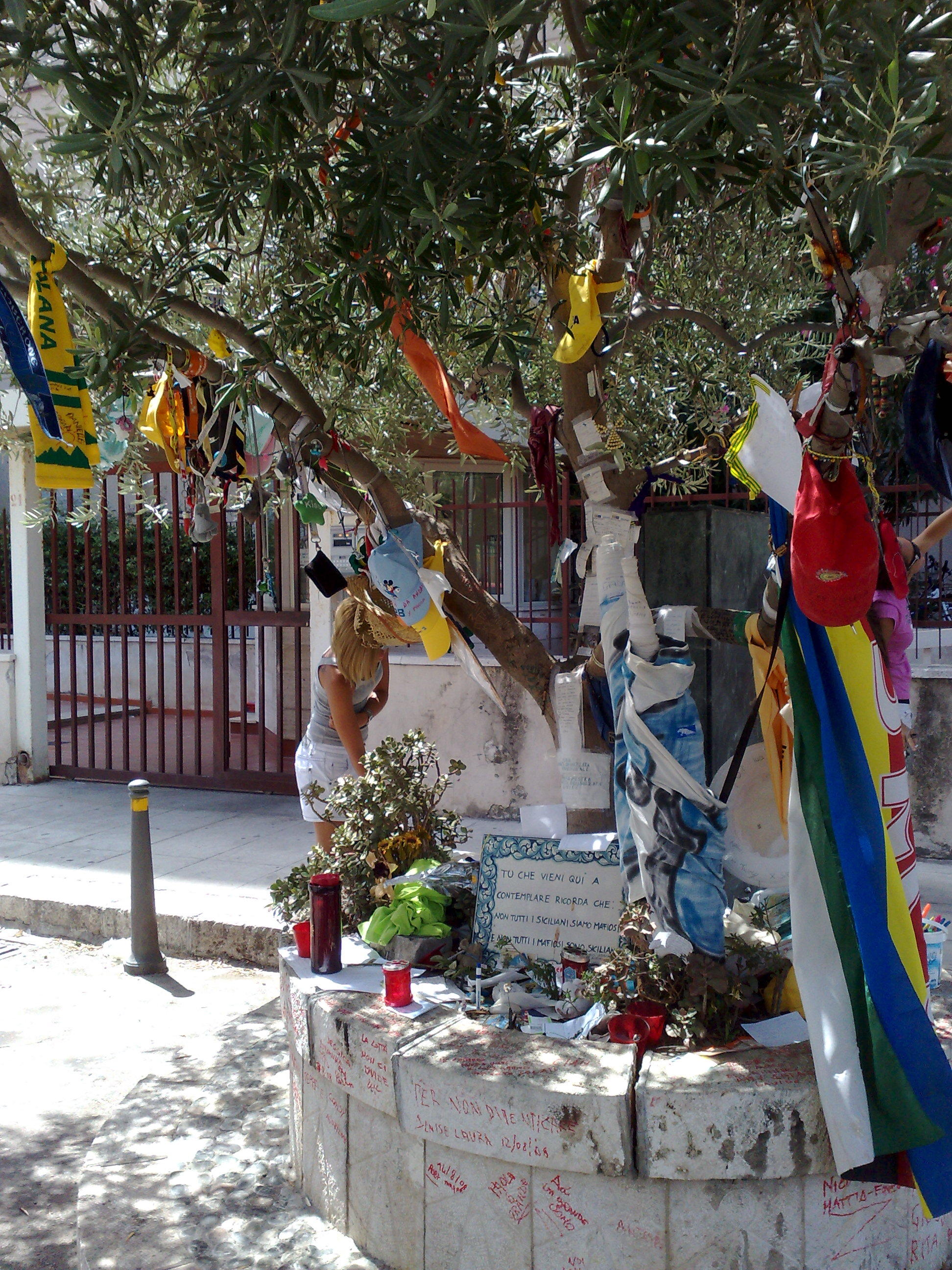
A memorial in Via D'Amelio

== Investigations and sentences ==
In July 2007, the prosecutor's office in Caltanissetta opened an investigation into the possible involvement of agents from SISDE, Italy's civil intelligence service, in the massacre. At the same time, a letter from Borsellino's brother Salvatore was published. Entitled 19 luglio 1992: Una strage di stato ("19 July 1992: A state massacre"), the letter supports the hypothesis that Minister of the Interior Mancino knew the reasons for the magistrate's assassination. Salvatore Borsellino wrote:

I ask senator Mancino, who shed a tear, I remember, during a commemoration of Paolo in Palermo in the years after 1992, to strain his memory to tell us what they talked about in the meeting with Paolo in the days immediately before his death. Or to explain why, after phoning my brother to meet him when he was interrogating Gaspare Mutolo [a mafia pentito] just 48 hours before the massacre, he had him meet Police Chief Parisi and Bruno Contrada [an SISDE officer who was later convicted for leaking details of investigations to mafiosi], a meeting that disturbed Paolo so much that he was seen holding two lit cigarettes at the same time ... That meeting surely holds the key to his death and to the massacre of Via D'Amelio.

Investigations held by police telecommunications expert Gioacchino Genchi attested the presence of an undercover SISDE installation in Castello Utveggio, an Art Nouveau castle on Monte Pellegrino, a mountain overlooking Palermo and Via D'Amelio. This was discovered by analyzing the phone calls of mafia boss Gaetano Scotto, who called a SISDE phone in the castle. Scotto's brother Pietro had done maintenance work on phone lines in Via D'Amelio; it was later discovered that Pietro had tapped Borsellino's mother's phone to obtain confirmation of Borsellino's arrival before the massacre. All trace of SISDE disappeared from Castello Utveggio immediately after the assassination. Mafia boss Totò Riina spoke about the presence of the Italian intelligence service on Monte Pellegrino on 22 May 2004, in the trial relating to the Via dei Georgofili bombing. In an interview on the Italian state TV documentary show La storia siamo noi (History is Us), Borsellino's widow said he, in the days before the massacre, had her close the shutters on the windows because "they can observe us from Castello Utveggio".

The first investigations led to the arrest of Vincenzo Scarantino on 26 September 1992, accused by pentiti of having stolen the car used in the explosion. Scarantino later became a pentito himself. The magistrates also discovered the phone of Borsellino's mother had been tapped. A first trial for the massacre ended on 26 January 1996, with Scarantino sentenced to 18 years in prison, while Giuseppe Orofino, Salvatore Profeta and Pietro Scotto, those who prepared the bomb and intercepted the phone, were sentenced to life imprisonment. Scotto and Orofino were acquitted on appeal. A second trial was started in 1999 after Scarantino changed his statements; this time, Salvatore Riina, Pietro Aglieri, Salvatore Biondino, Carlo Greco, Giuseppe Graviano, Gaetano Scotto and Francesco Tagliavia were sentenced to life imprisonment. A third trial in 2002 involved 26 other mafia bosses who had been involved in the massacre in various ways, ending with life sentences for Bernardo Provenzano, Pippo Calò, Michelangelo La Barbera, Raffaele Ganci, Domenico Ganci, Francesco Madonia, Giuseppe Montalto, Filippo Graviano, Cristoforo Cannella, Salvatore Biondo, and another Salvatore Biondo.

In 1992, the Italian political world was shaken by the Mani Pulite (clean hands) corruption scandal, after which most of the parties that had been the traditional political supporters of the mafia would disappear. In 2009, Massimo Ciancimino, son of the mafioso former mayor of Palermo Vito Ciancimino, said the Italian establishment and the mafia had been negotiating a pact in those days. Among other things, the agreement would involve the creation of a new party, Forza Italia, with the help of founder Silvio Berlusconi's chief collaborator, Marcello Dell'Utri, who was later convicted of allegiance to the mafia.

After the new revelations, Sicilian attorneys started new investigations based on the hypothesis that Borsellino knew of the negotiations between the mafia, SISDE and senior politicians, and that he was assassinated because of this knowledge. The existence of negotiations between Italian institutions and the Sicilian mafia was confirmed in 2012 by Caltanissetta prosecutor Nico Gozzo as "by now an established fact".

The prosecutor in Caltanissetta reopened investigations after Gaspare Spatuzza, a Mafia killer who became a state witness (pentito) in 2008, admitted he stole the Fiat 126 used for the car bomb in the Via D’Amelio attack. His admission contradicted the declarations of Vincenzo Scarantino, who had confessed earlier to stealing the car and whose testimony was the main evidence in previous trials. When confronted with Spatuzza’s statement, Scarantino admitted that he had repeated what some investigating officers had forced him to tell the magistrates. Spatuzza's declaration led to the re-opening of the trial on Borsellino’s murder, which had been concluded in 2003.

Spatuzza claims that his boss, Giuseppe Graviano, told him in 1994 that future prime minister Silvio Berlusconi was bargaining with the Mafia, concerning a political-electoral agreement between Cosa Nostra and Berlusconi’s party Forza Italia, in exchange for certain guarantees – such as to stop the 1993 Mafia bomb terror campaign, to force state institutions to moderate their crackdown against the Mafia after the murders of Antimafia magistrates Falcone and Borsellino. Berlusconi had entered politics and won his first term as prime minister in 1994. Berlusconi's right-hand man Marcello Dell'Utri was the intermediary, according to Spatuzza. Dell'Utri has dismissed Spatuzza's allegations as "nonsense".

Spatuzza's assertions back up previous statements of the pentito Antonino Giuffrè, who said that the Graviano brothers were the intermediaries between Cosa Nostra and Berlusconi. Cosa Nostra decided to back Berlusconi's Forza Italia party from its foundation in 1993, in exchange for help in resolving the Mafia's judicial problems. The Mafia turned to Forza Italia when its traditional contacts in the discredited Christian Democrat party proved unable to protect its members from the rigours of the law. "The statements given by Spatuzza about prime minister Berlusconi are baseless and can be in no way verified," according to Berlusconi’s lawyer and MP for the People of Freedom party (Il Popolo della Libertà, PdL), Niccolò Ghedini.

The alleged negotiations between Dell'Utri and the Mafia followed an earlier attempt with Vito Ciancimino, the local political link for the Corleonesi clan, who supposedly had contacted government officials after the killing of Falcone to negotiate a stop to the killing spree. Borsellino apparently had been informed of the machinations. Two former colleagues of Borsellino have told investigators about a meeting with Borsellino in Palermo shortly before his death during which he broke down in tears saying, "A friend has betrayed me, a friend has betrayed me." "My brother's death was a State murder," Paolo's brother Salvatore Borsellino claims. "My brother knew about the negotiations between the Mafia and the state, and this is why he was killed."

On 20 October 2020, Matteo Messina Denaro was sentenced to life imprisonment by the Corte d'Assise for having been one of the instigators of the Via D'Amelio bombing. After his capture in January 2023, the sentence was confirmed on 18 July 2023.

== See also ==
- Capaci bombing, 1992 terrorist attack in which magistrate Giovanni Falcone was assassinated

== Sources ==
- Bongiovanni, Giorgio; Lorenzo Baldo (2010). Gli ultimi giorni di Paolo Borsellino. Aliberti. ISBN 978-8874246632.
