= Giuseppe Graviano =

Italian mob boss

- Mugshot of Giuseppe Graviano
- Born: Giuseppe Graviano; 30 September 1963 (age 63); Brancaccio, Palermo, Sicily, Italy
- Occupation: Mafia boss
- Spouse: Rosalia "Bibiana" Galdi
- Children: 2
- Parent: Michele Graviano
- Status: Imprisoned since 1994
- Allegiance: Brancaccio Mafia family / Sicilian Mafia
- Convictions: Mafia Association, Multiple murder
- Criminal charges: Mafia Association, Multiple murder
- Penalty: Life imprisonment

Giuseppe Graviano (Italian: [dʒuˈzɛppe ɡraˈvjaːno]; 30 September 1963) is an Italian mafioso from the Brancaccio quarter in Palermo. He also was one of the men of the death squad that murdered Salvatore Contorno's relatives. He is currently serving several life sentences. He and his three siblings became members of the Sicilian Mafia Commission for the Brancaccio-Ciaculli mandamento, substituting Giuseppe Lucchese who was in prison.

== Mafia bomb attacks in 1992-1993 ==
Graviano was among Mafia bosses linked with the murders of the Antimafia judges Giovanni Falcone in the Capaci bombing and Paolo Borsellino in the Via D'Amelio bombing, as well as the attempted murder of Commissioner Rino Germana.

After the arrest of Mafia boss Totò Riina in January 1993, the remaining bosses, among them Giuseppe Graviano, Matteo Messina Denaro, Giovanni Brusca, Leoluca Bagarella, Antonino Gioè and Gioacchino La Barbera came together a few times (often in the Santa Flavia area in Bagheria, on an estate owned by the mafioso Leonardo Greco). They decided on a strategy to force the Italian state to retreat. That resulted in a series of bomb attacks in 1993 in the Via dei Georgofili in Florence, in Via Palestro in Milan and in the Piazza San Giovanni in Laterano and Via San Teodoro in Rome, which left 10 people dead and 93 injured as well as damage to centres of cultural heritage such as the Uffizi Gallery.

The Graviano brothers, including the eldest one Benedetto Graviano, were seen as the organizers of the operation, in particular, to select the men who would carry out the bombings. Giuseppe and Filippo Graviano each received a life sentence for the bombings.

== Murder of Antimafia priest and arrest ==
Giuseppe and Filippo Graviano ordered the murder of the Antimafia priest Pino Puglisi on 15 September 1993. Puglisi was the pastor of San Gaetano’s Parish in the rough Palermo neighbourhood of Brancaccio and spoke out against the Mafia. One of the hitmen who killed Puglisi, Salvatore Grigoli, later confessed and revealed the priest’s last words as his killers approached: "I've been expecting you."

Filippo and Giuseppe Graviano were arrested in Milan on 27 January 1994, and have been in prison since. They were convicted for the Mafia bombings in Florence and Rome in 1993 and ordering the killing of Pino Puglisi, receiving life sentences. The two jailed brothers managed to impregnate their wives despite harsh regulations forbidding conjugal visits. Investigators realised the two men had fathered children while behind bars when their wives came to visit with babies. They believe that the two men used couriers to smuggle out their sperm.

== Sister takes over ==
With the two brothers serving their sentences, control of the Graviano clan passed to their sister, Nunzia Graviano, known as picciridda (the baby), reinvesting the family's financial assets and modernising its business. "She is the alter ego of her brothers in their territory and capable of managing a vast fortune," according to the prosecution. She may be the first woman to have acted as "regent" for a leading Mafia family. She reportedly followed the Milan stock market on teletext and was an avid reader of the financial daily Il Sole 24 Ore. Much of the Gravianos' wealth was invested in Italian blue-chip companies. She was also laundering some of the money abroad through a financial consultancy in Luxembourg. Nunzia Graviano was arrested in July 1999 in Nice (France).

== Brancaccio command ==
The third brother Benedetto Graviano, who has served a five-year sentence for Mafia conspiracy, has been arrested in July 2004 for cocaine trafficking. He allegedly financed 18 kilograms of cocaine in a joint venture with a 'Ndrangheta clan. The cocaine was distributed among the jet set in Palermo. After his release for insufficient evidence, he was arrested again in February 2005. Benedetto Graviano had taken over the command in the Brancaccio area after the arrest of regent Giuseppe Guttadauro. The Mafia family of Santa Maria di Gesù had tried to take over the Brancaccio area, but Cosa Nostra’s boss Bernardo Provenzano decided to re-instate the Gravianos.

Giuseppe Graviano recently gained an academic degree in mathematics and his brother Filippo in economics.

== Links with Berlusconi ==
According to the pentito Antonino Giuffrè the Graviano brothers were the intermediaries between Cosa Nostra and prime minister Silvio Berlusconi. Cosa Nostra decided to back Berlusconi's Forza Italia party from its foundation in 1993, in exchange for help in resolving the mafia's judicial problems. The mafia turned to Forza Italia when its traditional contacts in the discredited Christian Democrat party proved unable to protect its members from the rigours of the law.

According to Giuffrè, the Gravianos dealt directly with Berlusconi through the businessman Gianni Letta, in September or October 1993. The alleged pact fell apart in 2002. Cosa Nostra had achieved nothing. There were no revisions of Mafia trials, no changes in the law of asset seizures and no changes in the harsh article 41-bis prison regime.

=== Assertions of Gaspare Spatuzza ===
One of Graviano's subordinates Gaspare Spatuzza, who turned pentito in 2008, has confirmed Giuffrè's statements. Spatuzza testified that Graviano had told him in 1994 that future prime minister Silvio Berlusconi was bargaining with the Mafia, concerning a political-electoral agreement between Cosa Nostra and Berlusconi’s party Forza Italia. Spatuzza said Graviano disclosed the information to him during a conversation in a bar Graviano owned in the upscale Via Veneto district of the Italian capital Rome. Berlusconi’s right-hand man Marcello Dell'Utri was the intermediary, according to Spatuzza. Dell'Utri has dismissed Spatuzza's allegations as "nonsense".

On 4 December 2009, Spatuzza repeated his accusations in court at the appeal hearing against Dell’Utri, sentenced to 9 years in 2004, for collusion with the Mafia. He testified: "Graviano told me the name of Berlusconi and said that thanks to him and the man from our home town [an apparent reference to Dell' Utri] we have the country in our hands." Dell'Utri told the court that neither he nor Berlusconi had Mafia connections. On 11 December 2009, Filippo Graviano denied the assertions of Spatuzza before the court of Palermo. He said that he never had met Dell'Utri directly or indirectly. In 2012, Giuseppe Graviano was one of five that were sentenced to life imprisonment for his role in the murder of Giuseppe Di Matteo.
