= Claudio Martelli =

Italian former politician and journalist (born 1943)

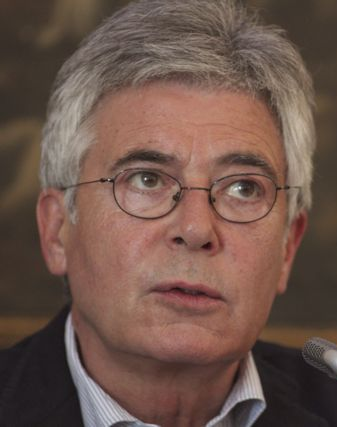

Minister of Justice
- In office 2 February 1991 – 10 February 1993
- Prime Minister: Giulio Andreotti; Giuliano Amato
- Preceded by: Giuliano Vassalli
- Succeeded by: Giovanni Conso

Deputy Prime Minister of Italy
- In office 22 July 1989 – 28 June 1992
- Prime Minister: Giulio Andreotti
- Preceded by: Gianni De Michelis
- Succeeded by: Giuseppe Tatarella; Roberto Maroni

Member of the European Parliament
- In office 20 July 1999 – 19 July 2004
- In office 24 July 1984 – 24 July 1989
- Constituency: Central Italy

Member of the Chamber of Deputies
- In office 20 June 1979 – 14 April 1994
- Constituency: Mantua (1979–1987; 1992–1994); Palermo (1987–1992)

Personal details
- Born: 24 September 1943 (age 83) Gessate, Italy
- Party: PRI (1956–1966); PSI (1966–1994); SDI (1998–2000); LS (2000–2001); NPSI (2001–2005)
- Height: 1.75 m (5 ft 9 in)
- Spouse: Lia Quartapelle (m. 2022)
- Education: University of Milan
- Occupation: Politician, university professor, journalist

Claudio Martelli (born 24 September 1943) is an Italian former politician and journalist. He is the editor-in-chief of the former Italian Socialist Party (PSI) newspaper Avanti! The right-hand man of Bettino Craxi, the PSI leader and Prime Minister of Italy from 1983 to 1987, Martelli was Deputy Prime Minister of Italy from 1989 to 1992 and Minister of Justice from 1991 to 1993, when he was implicated in the Tangentopoli scandal and left politics.

Martelli returned to politics in 1997 and re-founded Mondoperaio, a PSI-affiliated cultural magazine, and joined the Italian Democratic Socialists (SDI), becoming in 1999 a Member of the European Parliament (MEP), a position he first held with the PSI between 1984 and 1989. In 2001, he joined the centre-right coalition-affiliated New Italian Socialist Party (NPSI) and unsuccessfully ran for the Chamber of Deputies, a position he also held with the PSI from 1979 to 1994.

After again ending his party politics career in 2005, Martelli became a television presenter and re-launched Avanti!

== Early life and education ==
Martelli was born at Gessate, in the province of Milan. He graduated in Philosophy at the University of Milan and later worked there as an assistant for the faculty of Letters and Philosophy of the same university. Martelli ended his academic career in 1976 to focus on politics.

== Career ==
Martelli joined the PSI in 1966. In 1976, he was called by party leader Bettino Craxi to continue his career in Rome. He was elected to the Italian Parliament in 1979 and became vice-leader (with Valdo Spini) of the party in 1981. He was also elected for the PSI at the European Parliament in 1984. In 1989, he was nominated as vice-president of the Council of Ministers and in 1991 became Minister of Justice in both of the governments of Giulio Andreotti (1989–1992). In 1990, the Italian Immigration law known as the Martelli Law was passed in Parliament. During Tangentopoli, he ran for the party leadership after the resignation of Craxi, who was accused of corruption. His candidacy was blown off by his involvement in the 7 million dollar bribe in 1980, and he resigned as Minister of Justice.

Martelli exited the political world to deal with his judicial cases. In 1997, after concluding his legal battles, he founded Mondoperaio (former magazine of the PSI). In the same year, he was elected to the European Parliament for the SDI. In 2000, he left the SDI and joined the NPSI. He became spokesman for the party but was not elected to the Italian Parliament in 2001 and left the party in 2005. That same year, for a second time, he left party politics and became a presenter of several television programs. On 1 May 2020, he brought back Avanti! to the newsstands.

== Judicial proceedings ==
In the Tangentopoli scandal, regarding the illicit financing of the PSI, Martelli was sentenced to 8 months in prison in 2000, suspended on probation, after confessing, for having received ₤500 million in the case of the Enimont maxi-tangent. According to court documents, Roberto Calvi paid bribes to Martelli during the Banco Ambrosiano affair; however, he was not convicted in this case. His name was again brought to the attention of the judicial chronicles as part of the State-Mafia Pact trial, when the ex Cosa nostra killer Francesco Onorato told of the start of the strategy of the massacres prepared by Totò Riina after the sentence of the trial. He said: "In the list of people to kill, as I learned from Salvatore Biondino, the ambassador of the commission, there were Lima, Andreotti and his son, the former ministers Mannino, Vizzini, but also Martelli. We were the ones who had Martelli elected as minister of Justice: in 1987 we had financed his electoral campaign with ₤200 million. And then Martelli kept his promises, because he gave to some members of the mafia the hospital arrests."

== Personal life ==
In 2022, Martelli married Lia Quartapelle, a deputy from the Democratic Party.

== Electoral history ==
Election	House	Constituency	Party	Votes	Result
1979	Chamber of Deputies	Mantua–Cremona	PSI	14,813	Elected
1983	Chamber of Deputies	Mantua–Cremona	PSI	18,905	Elected
1984	European Parliament	Central Italy	PSI	255,249	Elected
1987	Chamber of Deputies	Palermo–Trapani–Agrigento–Caltanissetta	PSI	116,984	Elected
1992	Chamber of Deputies	Mantua–Cremona	PSI	27,003	Elected
1999	European Parliament	Central Italy	SDI	35,827	Elected
