= Capaci bombing =

1992 bombing by the Sicilian Mafia

- Aerial view of the bombing site on Highway A29
- Location: 38°10′58″N 13°14′41″E; Capaci, Sicily, Italy
- Date: 23 May 1992; 34 years ago 5:58 PM
- Target: Giovanni Falcone
- Attack type: Assassination
- Weapons: explosives (Semtex and TNT)
- Deaths: 5
- Injuries: 23
- Perpetrators: Sicilian Mafia, Giovanni Brusca (perpetrator)
- Motive: Retaliation against the anti-mafia fight

The Capaci bombing (Italian: Strage di Capaci) was a terror attack by the Sicilian Mafia that took place on 23 May 1992 on the A29 motorway, close to the junction of Capaci, Sicily. It killed magistrate Giovanni Falcone, his wife Francesca Morvillo, and three police escort agents, Vito Schifani, Rocco Dicillo and Antonio Montinaro; agents Paolo Capuzza, Angelo Corbo, Gaspare Bravo and Giuseppe Costanza survived.

Salvatore Cancemi, who later turned pentito, described the Mafia's victory celebration that followed the Capaci bombing; Salvatore "Totò" Riina ordered champagne while they toasted. Santino Di Matteo, who also later turned pentito, revealed all the details of the assassination: who tunnelled beneath the motorway, who packed the 13 drums with TNT and Semtex, who hauled them into place on a skateboard, and who pressed the remote-control button to trigger the bomb.

== Preparation ==
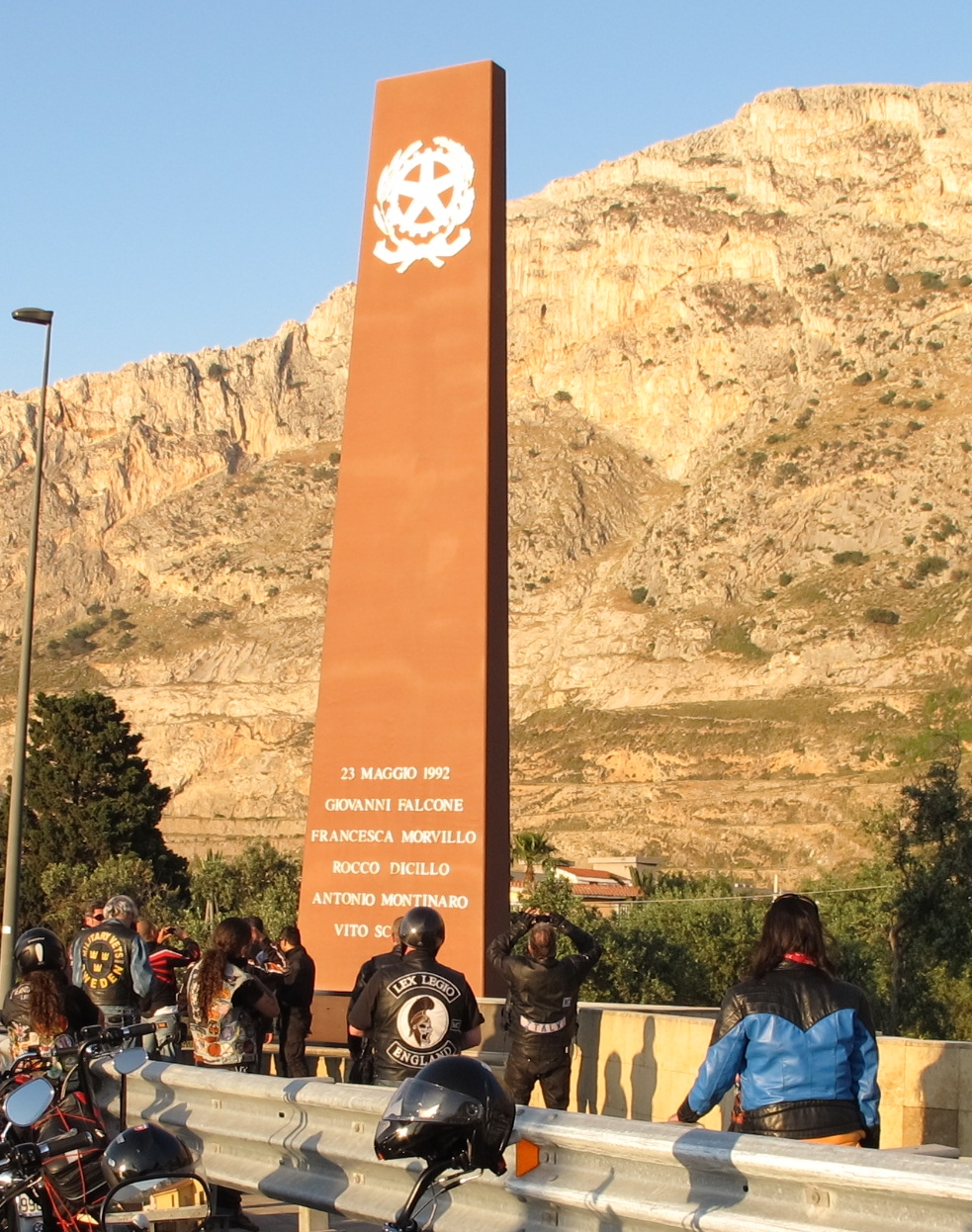
Memorial to the victims in Capaci

Falcone's killing was decided at meetings of the Sicilian Mafia Commission between September and December 1991, and orchestrated by boss Salvatore Riina, in which other targets were also identified. Following the judgment of the Supreme Court of Cassation confirming the claims of the Maxi Trial (30 January 1992), the Sicilian Mafia decided to start the attacks on political figures.

In April and May 1992, Salvatore Biondino, Raffaele Ganci and Salvatore Cancemi conducted inspections at Highway A29 in the Capaci area to find a suitable place for the attack to be carried out. During the same period, there were organizational meetings near Altofonte consisting of Giovanni Brusca, Antonino Gioè, Gioacchino La Barbera, Pietro Rampulla, Santino Di Matteo, and Leoluca Bagarella, where some 200 kilograms of quarry explosives were procured by Giuseppe Agrigento (mobster of San Cipirello). The explosives were then taken to the house of Antonino Troia (under the Capaci family), where another meeting took place also including Raffaele Ganci, Salvatore Cancemi, Giovan Battista Ferrante, Giovanni Battaglia, Salvatore Biondino and Salvatore Biondo, during which the transfer of the other part of the explosive (TNT and RDX) was carried out by Biondino and Giuseppe Graviano (head of the Brancaccio Family).

According to imprisoned ex-mafia informant Maurizio Avola, boss John Gotti of the powerful New York mafia Gambino family sent an explosives expert to train the Corleonesi Mafia clan killers in the use of explosives.

Brusca, La Barbera, Di Matteo, Ferrante, Troia, Biondino and Rampulla repeatedly experimented with the functioning of the electrical devices that had been procured by Rampulla to be used for the explosion. They also tested an electrical appliance at the agreed-upon site on the highway, and cut tree branches that blocked the view of the highway. On the evening of 8 May, Brusca, Barbera, Gioè, Troia and Rampulla arranged 13 barrels loaded with about 400 kilograms of explosives onto a skateboard placed in a drainage tunnel under the highway. In the middle of May, Raffaele Ganci, his sons Domenico and Calogero and his nephew Antonino Galliano took care of monitoring the movements of the Fiat Cromas which carried Falcone and his entourage returning from Rome to Palermo.

== Bombing ==
On 23 May, Domenico Ganci first heard from Ferrante and La Barbera that a Fiat Croma had left for Falcone. Ferrante and Biondo, who were stationed near Punta Raisi Airport, later saw the cars from the airport and warned La Barbera that Falcone had arrived. La Barbera followed Falcone's procession on a road parallel to Highway A29, staying in contact by telephone for 3–4 minutes with Gioè, who was stationed with Brusca on the hills above Capaci adjacent to the detonation site on the highway. At the sight of the procession, Brusca activated the remote control that caused the explosion. The first car was hit by the full force of the explosion and thrown from the road surface into an orchard of olive trees a few tens of meters away, instantly killing agents Antonio Montinaro, Vito Schifani and Rocco Dicillo. The second car, carrying Falcone and his wife, crashed against the concrete wall and the debris, fatally ejecting Falcone and his wife, who were not wearing seat belts, through the windscreen.

Thousands gathered at the Church of Saint Dominic for the funerals which were broadcast live on national TV. All regular television programs were suspended. Parliament declared a day of mourning. Falcone's colleague Paolo Borsellino was killed 57 days later, along with five police officers: Agostino Catalano, Walter Cosina, Emanuela Loi, Vincenzo Li Muli, and Claudio Traina, in the Via D'Amelio bombing.

== Investigations ==
In 1993, the Direzione Investigativa Antimafia managed to locate and intercept Antonino Gioè, Santino Di Matteo and Gioacchino La Barbera, who were heard on phone calls referencing the Capaci bombing. After being arrested, Gioè committed suicide in his cell, while Di Matteo and La Barbera decided to cooperate with the government, revealing the names of the other executors of the massacre. To force Di Matteo to retract his statements, Giovanni Brusca, Leoluca Bagarella, Giuseppe Graviano and Matteo Messina Denaro decided to abduct his son Giuseppe Di Matteo, who was brutally strangled and dissolved in acid after 779 days of being held hostage. Despite this, Di Matteo continued to cooperate with justice.

In 1997, the Corte d'Assise of Caltanissetta sentenced at first instance to life imprisonment: Salvatore Riina, Peter Aglieri, Bernardo Brusca, Leoluca Bagarella, Raphael and Domenico Ganci, John Battaglia, Salvatore Biondino, Salvatore Biondo, Giuseppe Calò, Philip and Joseph Gravano, Michelangelo La Barbera, Salvatore and Giuseppe Montalto, Matteo Motisi, Pietro Rampulla, Bernardo Provenzano, Benedetto Spera, Antonino Troia, Benedetto Santapaola and Giuseppe Madonia while Mariano Agate, Giuseppe Lucchese, Salvatore Sbeglia, Giusto Sciarrabba, Salvatore Buscemi, Giuseppe Farinella were acquitted, Antonino Giuffrè, Francesco Madonia and Giuseppe Agrigento. Also sentenced were Giovanni Brusca (26 years), Salvatore Cancemi (21 years), Giovanbattista Ferrante (17 years), Gioacchino La Barbera (15 years and two months), Santino Di Matteo and Calogero Ganci (15 years). In April 2000, the Court of Appeal of Caltanissetta upheld all the convictions and acquittals, but also sentenced to life imprisonment, Salvatore Buscemi, Francesco Madonia, Antonino Giuffrè, Mariano Agate and Giuseppe Farinella.

In May 2002, the Court of Cassation annulled the convictions at Court of Appeal of Catania, of Pietro Aglieri, Salvatore Buscemi, Giuseppe Calò, Giuseppe Farinella, Antonino Giuffrè, Francesco Madonia, Giuseppe Madonia, Giuseppe and Salvatore Montalto, Matteo Motisi and Benedetto Spera. In July 2003 a part of the process for the Capaci bombing and the massacre of Via d'Amelio were brought together in one trial because they had been accused in common: in April 2006 the Court of Appeal of Catania condemned twelve people, as they were deemed to be mandated by both massacres: Giuseppe Montalto, Salvatore Montalto, Giuseppe Farinella, Salvatore Buscemi, Benedetto Spera, Giuseppe Madonia, Carlo Greco, Stefano Ganci, Antonino Giuffrè, Pietro Aglieri, Benedetto Santapaola and Mariano Agate; Giuseppe Lucchese was acquitted.

On 20 October 2020, Messina Denaro was sentenced to life imprisonment by the Corte d'Assise for having been one of the instigators of the Capaci bombing. After his capture in January 2023, the sentence was confirmed on 18 July 2023.

== See also ==
- Via D'Amelio bombing, 1992 terrorist attack in which magistrate Paolo Borsellino was assassinated
