= Giovanni Brusca =

Italian mobster and murderer (born 1957)

- Mafia boss Giovanni Brusca
- Born: Giovanni Brusca; 20 February 1957 (age 69); San Giuseppe Jato, Sicily, Italy
- Other names: 'U verru ("The Pig") 'U scannacristiani ("The Christians-Slayer")
- Occupation: Mobster
- Status: Released
- Allegiance: San Giuseppe Jato Mafia Family
- Convictions: Mafia association Multiple murder
- Criminal charges: Mafia association Multiple murder
- Penalty: Life imprisonment (later reduced to 26 years following cooperation)

Giovanni Brusca (Italian pronunciation: [dʒoˈvanni ˈbruska]; born 20 February 1957) is an Italian mobster and former member of the Corleonesi clan of the Sicilian Mafia. He played a major role in the 1992 murders of Antimafia Commission prosecutor Giovanni Falcone and businessman Ignazio Salvo, and once stated that he had committed between 100 and 200 murders. Brusca had been sentenced to life imprisonment in absentia for Mafia association and multiple murder. He was captured in 1996, turned pentito and his sentence reduced to 26 years in prison. In 2021, Brusca was released from prison on parole.

A pudgy, bearded and unkempt mafioso, Brusca was known in Mafia circles as 'u verru (in Sicilian), il porco or il maiale (in Italian; "the pig", "the swine"), and 'u scannacristiani ("the people-slayer"; in the Sicilian language, the word cristianu means both "Christian" and "human being"). Tommaso Buscetta, the Mafia pentito who had cooperated with Falcone's investigations, remembered Brusca as "a wild stallion but a great leader."

== Early life ==
Giovanni Brusca was born on 20 February 1957 in San Giuseppe Jato. His grandfather and great-grandfather, both farmers, were made members of the Mafia. His father Bernardo Brusca (1929–2000), a local Mafia patriarch, served concurrent life sentences for numerous homicides. Bernardo allied himself with the Corleonesi clan of Salvatore Riina, Bernardo Provenzano and Leoluca Bagarella when he replaced Antonio Salamone as capomandamento of San Giuseppe Jato. He paved the way for his three sons' careers—Giovanni, his younger brother Vincenzo and elder brother Emanuele. When Bernardo was sent to prison in 1985, Giovanni became head of his San Giuseppe Jato district.

== Murders ==
In 1992, Brusca was involved in the Capaci bombing, murdering the anti-Mafia prosecutor Giovanni Falcone by planting half a tonne of explosives on the A29 motorway near the town of Capaci. Brusca detonated the explosives as Falcone's car drove along the road, killing Falcone, his wife and his three bodyguards. Months after Falcone's death, Brusca also murdered crime boss Vincenzo Milazzo and businessman Ignazio Salvo.

After Santino Di Matteo was arrested on 4 June 1993, he became the first of Falcone's assassins to become a government witness – a pentito. He revealed all the details of the assassination: who tunnelled beneath the motorway, who packed the thirteen drums with TNT and Semtex, who hauled them into place on a skateboard and who triggered the detonator. In retaliation for Di Matteo becoming an informant, the Mafia kidnapped his 11-year-old son, Giuseppe, on 23 November 1993. According to a later confession by one of the kidnappers, Gaspare Spatuzza, they dressed as police officers and told the boy he was being taken to see his father, who was at that time being kept in police protection on the Italian mainland.

Di Matteo made a desperate trip to Sicily to try to negotiate his son's release, but on 11 January 1996, after 779 days, the boy, who by now had also become physically ill due to mistreatment and torture, was strangled to death; his body was subsequently dissolved in a barrel of acid — a practice known colloquially as the lupara bianca. The boy's executioners were Giovanni's brother Enzo, Vincenzo Chiodo and Salvatore Monticciolo, acting on the orders of Giovanni himself. Shortly before he ordered the murder of Giuseppe, Brusca had discovered that he had been sentenced in absentia to a life sentence for Salvo's murder.

Brusca was involved in the campaign of terror in 1993 against the state during their crackdown against the Mafia after the murders of Falcone and another anti-Mafia magistrate, Paolo Borsellino. In the months following Riina's arrest in January 1993, a series of bombings by the Corleonesi targeted tourist spots on the Italian mainland: the Via dei Georgofili bombing in Florence, Via Palestro in Milan and the Piazza San Giovanni in Laterano and Via San Teodoro in Rome, which left ten people dead and 71 injured as well as severe damage to centres of cultural heritage such as the Uffizi Gallery.

In 2026, while testifying in a trial against Salvatore Baiardo, Brusca stated that, in 1994, following the Mafia bombings of 1992 and 1993, "in discussions with Bagarella, we spoke of using them as a political tool, as if they had been instigated by the Left" to facilitate Berlusconi's entry into politics. He declared that Vittorio Mangano had been contacted to reach Berlusconi, and that he subsequently "let us know that he had made contact, that he had informed Berlusconi either through Dell'Utri or other channels, and reported back that Berlusconi had expressed his thanks and promised to help us as soon as possible." However, a "veiled threat" was also sent: "if he didn't help us, we would have planted more bombs to put him in a difficult political position."

== Arrest ==
On 20 May 1996, Brusca was arrested in a small house near Agrigento, where he was dining with his girlfriend, their young son and his brother Vincenzo, his sister-in-law and their two children. The investigators were able to pinpoint their exact location when the noise of a plainclothes officer driving by the house on a motorbike was picked up by officers listening to a call intercepted on Brusca's mobile phone.

When Brusca was hurried into Palermo police station some ninety minutes after the arrest, dozens of police officers cheered, honked their horns and embraced each other. As the scruffy-bearded Brusca emerged from a car, clad in dirty jeans and a rumpled white shirt, some ripped off their ski masks, as if to say they no longer had anything to fear from the Mafia. One reportedly managed to slip past guards and punched Brusca in the face.

In 1997, Di Matteo and Brusca met face to face during court proceedings. Bursting into tears, Di Matteo told the judge: "I guarantee my collaboration, but to this animal I guarantee nothing. If you leave me alone with him for two minutes I'll cut off his head." The confrontation threatened to become violent, but court security guards restrained Di Matteo. Brusca had also asked Giuseppe Di Matteo's family for forgiveness. In 1999, Brusca was sentenced to thirty years in prison for Giuseppe's murder.

In 1997, Brusca was sentenced to 26 years in prison for the Capaci bombing. In court he admitted to detonating the bomb, planted under the motorway from Palermo airport, by remote control while watching Falcone's convoy through binoculars from a hill. Brusca was given another life sentence in 2009 for the murder of Salvatore Caravà.

== Collaborating with Italian justice and release ==
After his arrest, Brusca started to collaborate with police. Initially his collaboration was met with skepticism, fearing his "repentance" to be a ruse to escape the harsh prison terms reserved for ranking Mafia bosses. In the first three months, much of what he told authorities turned out to be either unverifiable or false, and a growing chorus of politicians called for a tightening of the collaboration system.

Brusca had offered a controversial version of the capture of Totò Riina: a secret deal between Carabinieri officers, secret agents and Mafia bosses tired of Riina's dictatorship. According to Brusca, Provenzano "sold" Riina in exchange for the valuable archive of compromising material that Riina held in his apartment in Palermo. Brusca also claimed that Riina had told him that after the killing of Falcone, he had been in indirect negotiations with Minister of the Interior Nicola Mancino on a deal to prevent any further killings. Mancino later said this was not true, but in July 2012 he was ordered to stand trial for withholding evidence on 1992 talks between the Italian state and the Mafia and in the killings of Falcone and Borsellino.

Brusca was imprisoned in Rebibbia, Rome, and though he requested house arrest nine times since 2002, all of these requests had been refused. In 2004, it was reported that Brusca was allowed out of prison for one week every 45 days to see his family, a reward for his good behaviour as well as becoming an informant and co-operating with authorities. As a result of his cooperation, his sentence was reduced to 26 years in prison. On 31 May 2021, Brusca was released, 45 days before the conclusion of his sentence, on parole for four years. Amid public backlash, politicians Matteo Salvini of the Lega Nord and Enrico Letta of the Democratic Party were critical of the decision to release Brusca. Brusca was finally discharged from parole on 4 June 2025.

== Confiscated assets ==
The Brusca family land was seized by the government, and in 2000 was handed over to an organization called the Consortium for Legal Development. It restores property confiscated from imprisoned mafiosi and gives them back to the community. The small stone farmhouse at San Giuseppe Jato, forty minutes from Palermo, was renovated in 2004. It is Sicily's first anti-mafia agriturismo (farmstay). Tourists can enjoy organic pasta milled from wheat grown on Brusca's land and organic wine made from his vineyards by the Placido Rizzotto cooperative, named after a union leader from Corleone who was shot by the mafia in 1948.

== In popular culture ==
Brusca was portrayed in the 2007 Italian TV series Il Capo dei Capi, the 2018 TV series Il cacciatore (The Hunter), and the 2019 film Il traditore.

The Italian series Il cacciatore covers the entire period from after the deaths of Falcone and Borsellino right up to the arrest and imprisonment of Brusca over three seasons.

== Bibliography ==
- Jamieson, Alison (2000). The Antimafia: Italy's Fight Against Organized Crime, London: MacMillan Press ISBN 0-333-80158-X.

=== Biographies ===
- (in Italian) Lodato, Saverio (1999). Ho ucciso Giovanni Falcone: la confessione di Giovanni Brusca, Milan: Mondadori ISBN 88-04-45048-7
- (in Italian) "La deposizione" del collaboratore Giovanni Brusca.
