= List of victims of the Sicilian Mafia =

This list of victims of the Sicilian Mafia includes people who have been killed by the Sicilian Mafia while opposing its rule. It does not include people killed in internal conflicts of the Mafia itself.

== 1890s ==
=== 1893 ===
- February 1 – Emanuele Notarbartolo, former mayor of Palermo (1873–1876) and director of the Banco di Sicilia. He wanted to "clean" the management of the bank, damaging the Mafia political power.

== 1900s ==
=== 1905 ===
- October 14 – Luciano Nicoletti, peasant, militant of the Fasci Siciliani movement, engaged in struggles against large estates. He was 54 years old when he died.

=== 1906 ===
- January 13 – Andrea Orlando, doctor, city councilor. He supported the peasants in the struggles for "collective tenancy".

=== 1909 ===
- March 12 – Joseph Petrosino, a New York City police officer on a mission in Palermo to gather information from local police files to help deport Italian gangsters from New York as illegal immigrants.

== 1910s ==
=== 1911 ===
- May 16 – Lorenzo Panepinto, peasant leader in Santo Stefano Quisquina, involved in the Fasci Siciliani (Sicilian Leagues).

=== 1914 ===
- May 20 – Mariano Barbato and Giorgio Pecoraro, socialist militants from Piana dei Greci.

=== 1915 ===
- November 3 – Bernardino Verro, a Sicilian syndicalist and politician, involved in the Fasci Siciliani (Sicilian Leagues) a popular movement of democratic and socialist inspiration in 1891–1894, and the first socialist mayor of Corleone.

=== 1919 ===
- January 29 – Giovanni Zangara, elected councilor and then alderman on the list of Bernardino Verro.
- September 22 – Giuseppe Rumore, secretary of the Lega di miglioramento (League of improvement) in Prizzi.

== 1920s ==
=== 1921 ===
- April 28 – Vito Stassi, socialist militant from Piana dei Greci.

=== 1920 ===
- February 29 – Nicola Alongi, peasant leader involved in the Fasci Siciliani from Prizzi.
- October 14 – Giovanni Orcel, trade union leader from Palermo.

== 1930s ==
With fascist rule in the 1930s, the mob seemed to disappear due to repressive state action.

== 1940s ==
=== 1943 ===
- September 2 – Antonio Mancino, first carabiniere killed by the Mafia.

=== 1944 ===
- August 6 – Andrea Raja, trade unionist for the occupation of land by farmers.

=== 1945 ===
- March 28 – Calogero Comaianni, rural guard in Corleone after arresting Luciano Leggio for stealing wheat.
- September 13 – Liborio Ansalone, chief of the municipal police of Corleone.
- December 5 – Giuseppe Puntarello, a socialist trade union leader from Ventimiglia di Sicilia.

=== 1947 ===
- January 4 – Accursio Miraglia, a communist trade union leader from Sciacca.
- May 1 – Margherita Clesceri, Giorgio Cusenza, Giovanni Megna, Francesco Vicari, Vito Allotta, Serafino Lascari, Filippo Di Salvo, Giuseppe Di Maggio, Castrense Intravaia, Giovanni Grifò and Vincenza La Fata, killed in the Portella della Ginestra massacre, during Labour Day celebrations in Sicily near Piana degli Albanesi.
- November 8 – Vittorio Pipitone, trade unionist.

=== 1948 ===
- March 2 – Epifanio Li Puma, trade unionist.
- March 10 – Placido Rizzotto, a socialist trade union leader from Corleone, a stronghold of Mafia boss Michele Navarra and Luciano Leggio who killed Rizzotto. In 1952, Leggio was acquitted of Rizzotto's murder.
- March 11 – Giuseppe Letizia, a shepherd boy who witnessed the murder of Placido Rizzotto, was killed by the doctor Michele Navarra with a lethal injection.
- April 1 – Calogero Cangelosi, secretary of the Camporeale Chamber of Labor.

== 1950s ==
=== 1955 ===
- May 16 – Salvatore Carnevale, trade unionist.

=== 1957 ===
- April 25 – Pasquale Almerico, trade unionist.

== 1960s ==
=== 1960 ===
- March 30 – Cataldo Tandoy, former head of police of Agrigento.
- May 5 – Cosimo Cristina, a journalist with L'Ora in Palermo.

=== 1963 ===
- June 30 – Mario Malausa, Silvio Corrao, Calogero Vaccaro, Eugenio Altomare and Mario Farbelli from the Carabinieri, and Pasquale Nuccio and Giorgio Ciacci from the Army. Killed while defusing a car bomb intended for Mafia boss Salvatore "Ciaschiteddu" Greco in the so-called Ciaculli massacre.

== 1970s ==
=== 1970 ===
- September 16 – Mauro De Mauro, journalist for L'Ora in Palermo. He disappeared following his investigations on the mysterious death of Enrico Mattei and on the Golpe Borghese, a right wing coup attempt. De Mauro was allegedly murdered by the Mafia to cover up these events and possible political connections.

=== 1971 ===
- May 5 – Pietro Scaglione, Chief Prosecutor of Palermo, and his driver Antonino Lo Russo. The killing was ordered by Mafia boss Luciano Leggio, head of the Corleonesi.

=== 1972 ===
- October 27 – Giovanni Spampinato, journalist L'Ora who was killed while looking into the activities of neo-fascism in Sicily and Mafia smuggling activities along the east coast of Sicily.

=== 1977 ===
- August 20 – Giuseppe Russo, Lieutenant-Colonel of the Carabinieri, and Professor Filippo Costa. Russo was a confidant of Mafia boss Giuseppe Di Cristina who warned against the growing power of the Corleonesi faction, who killed Russo.

=== 1978 ===
- May 9 – Giuseppe Impastato, a political activist who opposed the Mafia in his hometown Cinisi, the stronghold of Mafia boss Gaetano Badalamenti.

=== 1979 ===
- January 26 – Mario Francese, an investigative journalist with the Giornale di Sicilia.
- March 9 – Michele Reina, provincial secretary of the Christian Democrats.
- March 20 – Carmine Pecorelli, journalist
- July 11 – Giorgio Ambrosoli, lawyer
- July 21 – Boris Giuliano, a police chief from Palermo and head of Palermo's Flying Squad (Squadra mobile), while investigating heroin trafficking by the Mafia.
- September 25 – Judge Cesare Terranova and his driver, policeman Lenin Mancuso. Terranova had been the examining magistrate at the Palermo prosecuting office and a former member of the Italian Antimafia Commission.

== 1980s ==
=== 1980 ===
- January 6 – Piersanti Mattarella, President of the Regional Government of Sicily wanting to clean up the government's public contracts racket that benefited Cosa Nostra, passing a law enforcing the same building standards used in the rest of Italy, thereby making the Mafia's building schemes illegal. On January 31, 2015, his younger brother Sergio Mattarella was elected by the Italian Parliament to serve as President of the Italian Republic.
- May 4 – Emanuele Basile, a captain of the Carabinieri and a collaborator of Judge Paolo Borsellino in anti-Mafia investigations.
- August 6 – Judge Gaetano Costa, Chief Prosecutor of Palermo, after he signed the 53 arrest warrants against the heroin-trafficking network of the Spatola-Inzerillo-Gambino clan in May 1980.

=== 1982 ===
- April 30 – Pio La Torre, regional secretary of the Italian Communist Party (Partito Comunista Italiano, PCI) and his driver Rosario Di Salvo. La Torre was killed after he initiated a law that introduced a new crime in the Italian legal system, mafia conspiracy, and the possibility for the courts to seize and to confiscate the assets of the persons belonging to the mafia conspiracy.
- June 16 – a squad of hitmen armed with AK-47 rifles kills Catanese boss Alfio Ferlito, who was transferred from Enna to the Trapani jail, and died with the three escort carabinieri Salvatore Raiti, Silvano Franzolin and Luigi Di Barca, and the driver Giuseppe Di Lavore in the so-called Circonvallazione massacre.
- August 12 – Paolo Giaccone, director of the institute of legal medicine.
- September 3 – General Carlo Alberto Dalla Chiesa, his wife Emanuela Setti Carraro and police officer Domenico Russo are killed in the so-called Via Carini massacre. Dalla Chiesa, at the time prefect of Palermo, was killed after being appointed three months earlier to fight the Mafia in the midst of the bloody Second Mafia War.
- November 14 – Calogero Zucchetto, Police officer of the Palermo Flying Squad.

=== 1983 ===
- January 26 – Gian Giacomo Ciaccio Montalto, magistrate.
- June 13 – Captain of the Carabinieri Mario D'Aleo, Giuseppe Bommarito and Pietro Morici.
- July 29 – Judge Rocco Chinnici, two of his police escorts, Mario Trapassi and Salvatore Bartolotta, and the concierge of his apartment block, Stefano Li Sacchi are killed by a bomb in via Pipitone. Chinnici had created the Antimafia Pool, a group of investigating magistrates who closely worked together investigating the Mafia.

=== 1984 ===
- January 5 – Giuseppe Fava, an investigative journalist and founder of the I Siciliani monthly magazine in Catania. The magazine investigated Cosa Nostra and its tentacles in politics and business, in particular those of Sicily's biggest Catania-based construction firms.

=== 1985 ===
- April 2 – Barbara Asta, and her little sons, the twin-brothers Salvatore and Giuseppe, by a car bomb intended to kill the magistrate Carlo Palermo in the so-called Pizzolungo massacre.
- July 28 – Giuseppe "Beppe" Montana, a flying squad officer in Palermo in charge of the hunt for Mafia fugitives.
- August 6 – Antonino "Ninni" Cassarà, police chief in Palermo and his bodyguard Roberto Antiochia. Cassarà drew up the 'Michele Greco + 161' report in July 1982, listing 162 Mafiosi who warranted arrest. The report was the start of an investigation that was to become the Maxi Trial, where most of the leadership of the Mafia were tried. He was shot to death with his colleague Roberto Antiochia by a team of gunmen armed with AK-47 outside his home.
- December 12 – Graziella Campagna, a 17-year-old girl who found a list of names of mafiosi inside of a coat at the laundromat where she worked. She recognized it as being important information and gave it to her brother who was a Carabinieri. Shortly after, she was tricked to get into a car with her killer, and she was led to an area in which she tried to run away, but was killed by five blasts of a shotgun.

=== 1986 ===
- October 7 – Claudio Domino, 11-year-old boy.

=== 1988 ===
- January 12 – Giuseppe Insalaco, the former mayor of Palermo. During the brief stint as mayor in 1984 he had tried to clean up the area of city contracts.
- January 14 – Natale Mondo, a police officer who was the partner of Ninni Cassarà.
- September 14 – Alberto Giacomelli, a retired judge in Trapani.
- September 25 – Judge Antonino Saetta and his son Stefano as they are returning to Palermo after a weekend in the country. Saetta was a member of the Palermo Court of Appeal. He was scheduled to hear the appeal of the Maxi Trial and had shown to be incorruptible.
- September 26 – Mauro Rostagno, a former radical student of Lotta Continua and journalist who had started a drug rehabilitation centre in Trapani. He denounced Mafia drug traffickers on the local television.

=== 1989 ===
- April 21 – Gianluigi Barletta, a ten-year-old boy wounded by a member of clan Cappello in Catania.
- June 9 – Salvatore Incardona, operator of the Vittoria fruit and vegetable market.
- August 5 – Antonino Agostino, a police officer who was shot to death with his wife outside his home by two gunmen in a motorcycle, was probably killed for investigating the attempted murder of judge Giovanni Falcone.

== 1990s ==
=== 1990 ===
- May 9 – Judge Giovanni Bonsignore, government official.
- September 21 – Judge Rosario Livatino, prosecutor in Agrigento, killed by the Stidda.

=== 1991 ===
- August 9 – Judge Antonino Scopelliti, a Supreme Court prosecutor murdered by the 'Ndrangheta on behalf of the Mafia while reviewing the final sentence of the Maxi Trial for the Supreme Court (Corte di Cassazione).
- August 29 – Libero Grassi, a businessman from Palermo, who was killed after taking a solitary stand against their demands for extortion, known as "pizzo".

=== 1992 ===
- March 12 – Salvo Lima, a Christian Democrat politician and former mayor of Palermo, three weeks before Italy's national election of 1992. The Mafia felt betrayed by Lima and his political patron Giulio Andreotti. In their opinion they had failed to block the confirmation of the sentence of the Maxi Trial against the Mafia by the Court of Cassation (court of final appeal) in January 1992.
- April 4 – Marshal of the Carabinieri Giuliano Guazzelli.
- May 23 – Judge Giovanni Falcone, with his wife, judge Francesca Morvillo and their escort of three policemen: Rocco Di Cillo, Antonio Montinaro and Vito Schifani, by a car bomb in what is known as the Capaci bombing. Falcone had been a member Antimafia pool of the prosecution office in Palermo that laid the groundwork for the Maxi Trial against the Sicilian Mafia.
- September 17 – Ignazio Salvo, a wealthy businessman from the town of Salemi with strong connections with the Mafia and the Christian Democrat party, in particular with the former mayor of Palermo, Salvo Lima, and Giulio Andreotti. He was killed because they had failed to block the confirmation of the sentence of the Maxi Trial against the Mafia by the Court of Cassation (court of final appeal) in January 1992.
- July 19 – Judge Paolo Borsellino, and his escort of five policemen: Agostino Catalano, Walter Cosina, Emanuela Loi, Vincenzo Li Muli, Claudio Traina in the so-called Via D'Amelio bombing, less than two months after the death of his colleague and friend Falcone, with whom he was part of the Antimafia pool.
- July 26 – Rita Atria, a witness of justice in a major Mafia investigation in Sicily. She committed suicide a week after the Mafia killed Antimafia prosecutor Paolo Borsellino.
- July 27 – Giovanni Lizzio, police inspector.
- November 10 – Gaetano Giordano, merchant.

=== 1993 ===
- January 8 – Giuseppe Alfano, journalist of the newspaper La Sicilia.
- May 27 – Angela Fiume, Fabrizio Nencioni, Dario Capolicchio, 50-day-old Caterina Nencioni and nine-year-old Nadia Nencioni in the so-called Via dei Georgofili massacre against the Uffizi Gallery in Florence in a series of terrorist bomb attacks after the arrest of Mafia boss Totò Riina in January 1993.
- July 27 – The firemen Carlo La Catena, Stefano Picerno and Sergio Pasotto, the traffic policeman Alessandro Ferrari, and Driss Moussafir, a homeless Moroccan citizen, in the so-called Via Palestro massacre in Milan in a series of terrorist bomb attacks after the arrest of Mafia boss Totò Riina in January 1993.
- September 15 – Pino Puglisi, the priest of San Gaetano's Parish in the Palermo neighbourhood of Brancaccio, the stronghold of Graviano clan, who spoke out against the Mafia.

=== 1995 ===
- March 24 – Luigi Botenza, prison police officer.
- November 9 – Serafino Famà, lawyer.
- December 23 – Giuseppe Montalto, prison police officer at the Ucciardone prison in Palermo.

=== 1996 ===
- January 11 – Giuseppe Di Matteo, son of Mafia pentito Santino Di Matteo was strangled, and his body subsequently dissolved in acid on the orders of Giovanni Brusca after being kidnapped on November 23, 1993, by Gaspare Spatuzza

=== 1998 ===
- October 8 – Domenico Geraci, member of the Italian Popular Party, candidate for mayor's chair.

== 2000s ==
=== 2000 ===
- February 5 – Salvatore Vaccaro Notte, foreman of foresters and brother of Vincenzo Vaccaro Notte, was killed for not having bowed to the influence of a local gang better known as "Cosca dei Pidocchi" (Gang of the lice).

=== 2004 ===
- February 11 – Attilio Manca, a medical urologist, was found dead in his house in Viterbo. The autopsy showed the presence of drugs in his body and it was initially thought that this was a case of overdose. But in fact, he was perhaps killed to cover up an action by the boss Bernardo Provenzano in Marseilles.

=== 2006 ===
- August 22 – Giuseppe D'Angelo, a pensioner, was accidentally killed in front of a greengrocer in the Sferracavallo district of Palermo because he was mistaken for the boss Bartolomeo Spatola.

== 2010s ==
=== 2010 ===
- February 26 – Enzo Fragalà, a lawyer and a politician, was killed because he instructed his clients to be open to the judiciary.
