= Cesare Terranova =

Italian judge

Member of the Chamber of Deputies
- In office 25 May 1972 – 19 June 1979
- Constituency: Catania

Personal details
- Born: 25 August 1921 Petralia Sottana, Sicily, Kingdom of Italy
- Died: 25 September 1979 (aged 58) Palermo, Sicily, Italy
- Cause of death: Assassination by shooting
- Party: Independent Left
- Profession: Antimafia judge

Cesare Terranova (Italian pronunciation: [ˈtʃeːzare ˌtɛrraˈnɔːva, ˈtʃɛː-]; 25 August 1921 – 25 September 1979) was an Italian judge and politician from Sicily, notable for his anti-Mafia stance. From 1958 until 1971 Terranova was an examining magistrate at the Palermo prosecuting office. He was one of the first to seriously investigate the Mafia and the financial operations of Cosa Nostra. He was assassinated by the Mafia in 1979.

He was the predecessor of judge Rocco Chinnici, who created the Antimafia Pool, a group of investigating magistrates who closely worked together, sharing information to diffuse responsibility and to prevent one person from becoming the sole institutional memory and solitary target, as Terranova had become.

== Early life and career ==
Cesare Terranova was born on 25 August 1921, in Petralia Sottana, a small town located about 70 km southeast of Palermo, Sicily. His studies were disrupted by the outbreak of the Second World War, during which he was personally involved from November 1942 until July of the following year. It was a harsh and challenging period, marked by his imprisonment and detention in prisoner-of-war camps in North Africa, from which he was not repatriated until October 1945. Upon his return, he enrolled at the University of Messina, where his father had, in the meantime, been appointed as a magistrate.

He entered the judiciary in 1946. In 1958 he became the head of the Examining Office at the Palermo Court. At the time, the prosecution was separated in an examining phase, the so-called instruction phase, and a prosecuting phase. Terranova helped bring numerous Mafiosi to trial and imprisonment. He was a key figure in the Trial of the 114 which saw many prominent Mafiosi on trial for their role in the First Mafia War in the early 1960s, that ended with the Ciaculli massacre on 30 June 1963. On 31 May 1965, he ordered the prosecution of 114 mafiosi.

Despite Terranova’s efforts, the verdict of the Trial of the 114 on 22 December 1968, by the Court in Catanzaro was a disappointment, and all but 10 of the 114 defendants, including many prominent mafiosi, were acquitted. Angelo La Barbera got 22 years and Tommaso Buscetta received 14 years for two so-called "white deaths" – the so-called lupara bianca which is used to refer to a mafia-style murder in which the victim's body is deliberately hidden.

Terranova was the first to acknowledge the existence of a Sicilian Mafia Commission. His knowledge was informed by confidential report of the Carabinieri of 28 May 1963, where a confidential informant revealed the existence of a commission composed of fifteen persons – six from Palermo city and the rest from towns in the province – "each with the rank of boss of either a group or a Mafia family." Judge Terranova did not believe that the existence of a commission meant that the Mafia was a tightly unified structure.

Terranova led investigations into the connections between the Mafia and politics. He looked into the exploits of the prominent Sicilian politician Salvatore Lima as mayor of Palermo, and concluded that Lima was in league with a number of Mafiosi, including Angelo La Barbera. In an indictment in 1964, Terranova wrote: "it is clear that Angelo and Salvatore La Barbera (well-known bosses in the Palermo area) ... knew former mayor Salvatore Lima and maintained relations in such a way as to ask for favours. ... The undeniable contacts of the La Barbera mafiosi with the one who was the first citizen of Palermo ... constitute a confirmation of ... the infiltration of the Mafia in several sectors of public life." However, nothing came of his enquiries or allegations.

== Prosecuting the Corleonesi ==
Terranova made little attempt to hide the fact that his ambition was to bring Luciano Leggio, the boss of the Corleone Mafia Family – known as the Corleonesi – to justice. In 1965, Terranova ordered the prosecution of over sixty Corleonesi, including Leggio (Trial Leggio + 63), for a series of murders in Corleone from 1958 to 1963. The most prominent victim had been the Mafia-boss of Corleone, Michele Navarra.

However, the sentence of the Bari Court on 10 June 1969 resulted in acquittals for all the 64 defendants. The jury found Leggio guilty of stealing grain in 1948, for which he received a suspended sentence, but he was pronounced not guilty on all other accounts, including the murders of Placido Rizzotto and Navarra. The judges and prosecutors received anonymous letters threatening them with death. Salvatore Riina – Leggio's eventual successor – was acquitted in 1969 and remained at large until his capture in 1993.

The Corleonesi were indicted in the Trial of the 114 related to the First Mafia War that resulted in the Ciaculli Massacre, that was also prepared by Terranova. During an interrogation preparing the trial, Leggio refused to answer questions. When in response to one of them, Leggio replied that he could not even recall his own name or his parents, Terranova instructed the clerk: "Write that Leggio does not know whose son he is." Leggio was infuriated with the implication that he was a bastard. The incident was the beginning of a deep hatred by Leggio for Terranova.

"Leggio actually had foam on his lips; he would have killed me on the spot if he could," Terranova told his wife. The prosecution appealed successfully against the Catanzaro verdict that had acquitted Leggio and had him tried in absentia in 1970. This time Leggio was found guilty, although he had left jail after the Catanzaro trial, given the time they had already spent in detention while awaiting trial, and it was not until 1974 that Leggio was captured again and taken into custody.

== Antimafia Commission ==
After the failure to fight the Mafia through the courts, Terranova changed strategy. In May 1972, he was elected as a representative in the Italian Parliament for the Independent Left, backed by the Italian Communist Party (PCI). He became the secretary of the Antimafia Commission that was established in 1963 after the Ciaculli massacre. He was re-elected in 1976. Terranova together with PCI deputy Pio La Torre wrote the 1976 minority report of the Antimafia Commission, which pointed to links between the Mafia and prominent politicians, in particular of the Christian Democrat party (DC - Democrazia Cristiana).

The majority in the Commission, chaired by Christian Democrat Luigi Carraro, had refused to incorporate modifications proposed by Terranova and La Torre, who then decided to publish a minority report. Terranova had urged his colleagues of the majority to take their responsibility. According to the minority report:

… it would be a grave error on the part of the Commission to accept the theory that the Mafia-political link has been eliminated. Even today the behaviour of the ruling DC group in the running of the City and the Provincional Councils offers the most favourable terrain for the perpetuation of the system of Mafia power.

The reports and the documentation of the Antimafia Commission were essentially disregarded. Terranova talked of “thirteen wasted years” of the Antimafia Commission, and did not seek re-election again.

== Death ==
After seven years in Rome, at the end of the legislature in June 1979, Cesare Terranova asked to be re-instated in the judiciary. He was again appointed as the chief examining magistrate at the Court in Palermo to take the fight against the Mafia in the courts. "Don't worry," he told his wife, "they don't dare touch judges, they won't touch me."

However, on 25 September 1979, then aged fifty-eight, Terranova was shot to death in his car, along with his driver, policeman Lenin Mancuso, who acted as his bodyguard. Terranova’s blend of investigative expertise and newly established political ties in Rome would have made him an even more formidable adversary to the Mafia than he had been previously. Taking Terranova’s place was Rocco Chinnici, who was murdered by the Mafia in 1983.

While in prison, Luciano Leggio had ordered the killing of Terranova as a revenge for the insult at the interrogation in the 1960s. The murder was approved by the Mafia Commission. Terranova had become the worst enemy of Leggio and the Corleonesi. He had a photograph of Leggio in his office that his colleagues had given him as a joke. Leggio was charged with ordering Terranova's murder, but was acquitted for lack of evidence, both in the first trial, which was held in Reggio Calabria in 1983, and in 1986, in the appeal process.

== New trial ==
In 1997, the prosecution office in Reggio Calabria re-opened the murder investigation after the pentiti Francesco Di Carlo and Gaspare Mutolo named the mafiosi Giuseppe Giacomo Gambino, Vincenzo Puccio, Giuseppe Madonia and Leoluca Bagarella as the material killers. Di Carlo confirmed that Leggio had ordered the killing of Terranova.

In 1974, when the Sicilian Mafia Commission was reorganized, Leggio through Totò Riina (Leggio was in jail) asked the Commission gathered at Michele Greco's estate Favarella for permission. The Commission decided, on instigation of Gaetano Badalamenti, that Terranova should be killed outside Sicily, in Rome. The killing was stalled because of plans to liberate Leggio. When that failed, Terranova's murder was on the agenda again and was confirmed in June 1979 during a Commission meeting at the Favarella estate.

On 15 January 2000, Salvatore Riina, Bernardo Brusca, Bernardo Provenzano, Francesco Madonia, Pippo Calò, Nenè Geraci and Michele Greco, all members of the Sicilian Mafia Commission at the time of the murder, were convicted to life sentences for ordering the murder of Terranova and Mancuso. Leggio had died. Leoluca Bagarella, Giuseppe Madonia and Giuseppe Farinella were acquitted as the material killers. After 25 years, in October 2004, the Supreme Court confirmed the life sentences for Totò Riina, Michele Greco, Nenè Geraci and Francesco Madonia.

== Legacy ==
Despite the fact that his prosecutions of the Mafia in the 1960s eventually failed in Court, Terranova was a pioneer in investigating the Mafia. His verdicts always included historical and theoretical aspects. He determined that there was "only one Mafia, neither old or young, neither good nor bad," but "efficient and dangerous, divided into clusters or groups or 'families,' or more accurate still, 'cosche.'" At the time, his analysis of the Mafia was modern and advanced. In the 1960s, it was not understood and accepted by the judiciary, which considered him too "bold" or worse, "imaginative". The revelations in 1984 of a pentito (informant) from the Mafia, Tommaso Buscetta, would prove him right.

Terranova paved the way for a more successful prosecution of the Mafia in the 1980s. He was the predecessor of judge Rocco Chinnici, who succeeded Terranova as the chief examining magistrate at the Court in Palermo and who also became a victim of a Mafia attack in July 1983. Chinnici created the Antimafia Pool, a group of investigating magistrates who closely worked together to diffuse responsibility and to prevent one person from becoming a solitary target, like Terranova. Chinnici signed all indictments, along with the magistrates Giovanni Falcone and Paolo Borsellino, who were also killed by the Mafia in 1992, and other Sicilian judges, who presented a unified front to fight the Mafia. By joining efforts, they were a more difficult target for mafiosi, and preserved institutional memory by sharing information. Falcone and Borsellino prepared the Maxi Trial, that convicted 338 of the 475 Mafiosi members originally charged.

Cesare Terranova’s widow Giovanna became a prominent personality in the Antimafia movement after her husband was murdered. She co-founded the first permanent civil Antimafia organisation, the Associazione donne siciliane per la lotta contro la Mafia (Association of Sicilian Women against the Mafia). Giovanna Terranova said in an interview: "I would have felt guilty if I had stayed at home. I would have thought: Cesare died for nothing. Yes, because being killed is terrible, but being forgotten is even worse. It’s like dying twice."

In January 1982, on the initiative of judge Chinnici, a research center in the name of Cesare Terranova, the Centro Studi Giuridici e Sociali "Cesare Terranova", was set up in Palermo to honour his memory.

== Quotes ==
"The Mafia is oppression, arrogance, greed, self-enrichment, power and hegemony above and against all others. It is not an abstract concept, or a state of mind, or a literary term... It is a criminal organization regulated by unwritten but iron and inexorable rules... The myth of a courageous and generous 'man of honour' must be destroyed, because a mafioso is just the opposite."

"It is necessary to dismantle the myth of the mafioso as a brave and generous “man of honour”, since the mafioso is characterised by a totally opposite character…the mafioso shoots others in the back, by treachery, when he is secure to have the total control upon the victim… He is ready to any compromise, to any renunciation and to the worst mean actions in order to save himself in a dangerous situation… the consciousness that nobody will denounce him, and that hidden and influential forces will rush to his help, gives the mafioso arrogance and boldness, at least until the right and severe application of the law will reach him."

== Electoral history ==
Election	House	Constituency	Party	Votes	Result
1972	Chamber of the Deputies	Catania–Messina–Siracusa–Ragusa–Enna	PCI	37,662	Elected
1976	Chamber of the Deputies	Catania–Messina–Siracusa–Ragusa–Enna	PCI	39,989	Elected

== Depictions in works ==
- Il Capo dei Capi, Italian crime drama miniseries

== See also ==
- List of victims of the Sicilian Mafia

== Sources ==
- Allum, Felia and Renate Siebert (eds.) (2012). Organised Crime and the Challenge to Democracy, London: Routledge, ISBN 9781134201501
- Follain, John (2008). The Last Godfathers: Inside the Mafia's Most Infamous Family, New York: Thomas Dunne Books, ISBN 978-0-312-56690-6
- Gambetta, Diego (1993).The Sicilian Mafia: The Business of Private Protection, London: Harvard University Press, ISBN 0-674-80742-1
- Jamieson, Alison (2000). The Antimafia: Italy's fight against organized crime, London: Macmillan, ISBN 0-333-80158-X.
- Schneider, Jane T. and Peter T. Schneider, (2003). Reversible Destiny: Mafia, Antimafia, and the Struggle for Palermo, Berkeley: University of California Press ISBN 0-520-23609-2
- Servadio, Gaia (1976), Mafioso. A history of the Mafia from its origins to the present day, London: Secker & Warburg ISBN 0-436-44700-2
- Shawcross, Tim and Martin Young (1987). Men Of Honour: The Confessions Of Tommaso Buscetta, Glasgow: Collins ISBN 0-00-217589-4
- Sterling, Claire (1990). Octopus. How the long reach of the Sicilian Mafia controls the global narcotics trade, New York: Simon & Schuster, ISBN 0-671-73402-4.
- Stille, Alexander (1995), Excellent Cadavers. The Mafia and the Death of the First Italian Republic, New York: Vintage ISBN 0-09-959491-9
