= Giuseppe Montana =

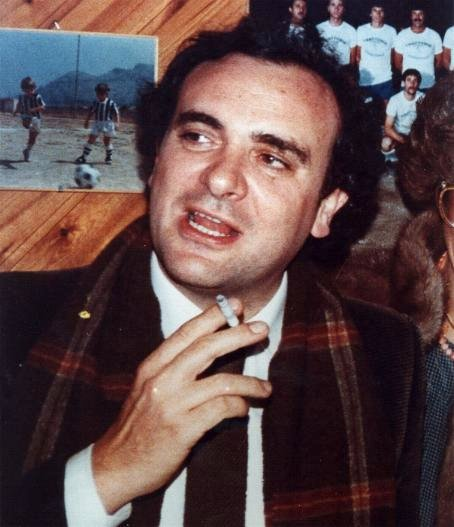
Giuseppe Montana

Giuseppe Montana, (Italian pronunciation: [dʒuˈzɛppe monˈtaːna]; Agrigento, October 8, 1951 – Santa Flavia, July 28, 1985), was an Italian policeman assassinated by the Cosa Nostra.

== Life ==
Commissioner of the Judicial police of Palermo, he was chief of the newly created Sezione Catturandi, which was responsible for the search for fugitives. In this role he gained great results, discovering Michele Greco's arsenal in 1983 and capturing Tommaso Spadaro (Giovanni Falcone's childhood friend), who became the boss of cigarette smuggling and drug trafficking. He collaborated with the San Michele maxi blitz of the Antimafia pool, taking part in the 475 arrest orders. He continued to work closely with the pool until his last day, consolidating the relationship with that structure born with prosecutor Rocco Chinnici, engaged in the front line of the struggle against the Cosa Nostra.

Following Chinnici's killing, Montana said: "In Palermo we are just about ten people to constitute a real threat to the Mafia. And their hitmen know us all. We are easy targets, unfortunately, and if the Mafia decide to kill us they can do it without difficulty."

Three days before the death of Montana, on July 25, 1985, his team had arrested eight men of Michele Greco, who managed to escape from capture.

== Death ==
On July 28, 1985, the day before going on holiday, Montana was killed by three Corleonesi hitmen, armed with revolvers (a 357 Magnum and two .38 Special with expanding bullets), while he was with his girlfriend in Porticello, a fraction of Santa Flavia near the harbour where his motorboat was moored.

From the day of his killing, began a summer that saw the city of Palermo immersed in the blood of the victims of the Mafia: in just ten days, three investigators of the Palermo judicial police were murdered, particularly exposed because, according to a large number of unanimous sources, these men were left alone.

== See also ==
- List of victims of the Sicilian Mafia
- Ninni Cassarà
- Boris Giuliano
- Carlo Alberto Dalla Chiesa
- Paolo Borsellino
- Giovanni Falcone
- Gaetano Costa
- Rocco Chinnici
- Il Capo dei Capi
