= Geraci (surname) =

Geraci is an Italian surname.

== People ==
Notable people with the surname include:

- Alan Yuri Geraci, Italian drag queen
- Anthony Geraci (born 1954), American blues and jazz musician
- Benedetto Geraci (1590–1660), Italian Roman Catholic bishop
- Frank Paul Geraci Jr. (born 1951), American judge
- Gino Geraci, American pastor and Christian radio talk show host
- Michele Geraci (born 1966), Italian economist and politician
- Nenè Geraci (1917–2007), Sicilian Mafioso
- Peter Francis Geraci, American bankruptcy attorney
- Sonny Geraci (1946–2017), American musician and singer
- Tommaso Geraci (born 1931), Italian sculptor

== Fictional characters ==
- Nick Geraci, the fictional character who kidnaps and murders Tom Hagen in Mark Winegardner's novel, The Godfather's Revenge (2006)
- Captain Sidney Geraci, a character in the film Brooklyn's Finest
- Steve Geraci, the fictional Sheriff of Iberia Parish, Louisiana, in True Detective (season 1), episode 7
- The Geracis, Marvel Comics characters

== See also ==
- Geraci (disambiguation)
