= Nenè Geraci =

Member of the Sicilian Mafia

Antonio Nenè Geraci, Mafia boss of Partinico.

Antonino Geraci (Partinico, 2 January 1917 – Partinico, 6 February 2007), better known as Nenè or il vecchio (the old one), was the historical boss of the Mafia in Partinico, in the Metropolitan City of Palermo. Geraci sat on the Sicilian Mafia Commission since the mid-1970s and belonged to the hard line faction allied with the Corleonesi of Totò Riina and Bernardo Provenzano. According to the pentito Tommaso Buscetta, Geraci took care of the fugitive Riina while he stayed in Partinico.

As a member of the Commission, Geraci was implicated in many decisions that involved the killing of prominent Antimafia personalities and various high level law enforcement officials, the so-called Excellent Cadavers. As part of the Maxi Trial in 1987, he was sentenced to 12 years in prison. Through his membership or seat on the Sicilian Mafia Commission or Cupola, Geraci like several of his fellow mafia capos was directly held responsible for the killings of Antimafia judges Cesare Terranova, Rocco Chinnici, Antonino Saetta, Giovanni Falcone, Paolo Borsellino, the communist politician Pio La Torre and Carabinieri captain Emanuele Basile. In 2002, Geraci was sentenced to life imprisonment for his role in the murder of Chinnici.

In the 1990s a war of power in Partinico set the Geraci family against the Vitale family, headed by Vito Vitale. The former were loyal to Provenzano, while the Vitale clan were supported by Totò Riina and Leoluca Bagarella.

Geraci was allowed to leave prison in May 2005 because of ill health and to return to his home town. The 88-year-old was blind, had heart problems and was restricted to a wheelchair. He died from a heart failure in his bed on 6 February 2007.
