= Ninni Cassarà =

Italian police officer (1947–1985)

Antonino "Ninni" Cassarà
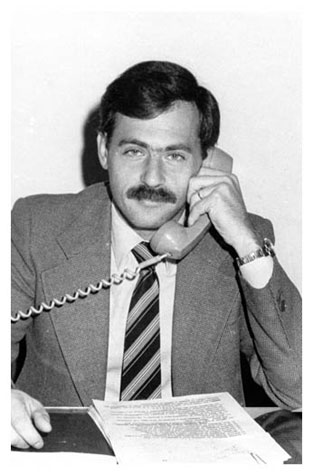
- Born: Antonino Cassarà; May 7, 1947; Palermo, Italy
- Died: 6 August 1985 (aged 38); Palermo, Italy
- Resting place: Sant'Orsola Cemetery, Palermo
- Other names: Ninni
- Known for: Anti-Mafia investigations; contributing to the groundwork of the first Maxi Trial
- Notable work: Pizza Connection operation
- Spouse: Laura Cassarà
- Police career
- Country: Italian State Police
- Allegiance: Italy
- Department: Judicial Police
- Status: Killed in the line of duty
- Rank: Commissioner; Deputy Chief of Judicial Police

Antonino "Ninni" Cassarà (Italian pronunciation: [antoˈniːno ˈninni kassaˈra]; May 7, 1947 – August 6, 1985) was an Italian policeman killed by Cosa Nostra.

== Life ==
Born in Palermo on May 7, 1947, he was Commissioner in Reggio Calabria and then in Trapani, where he learned about Giovanni Falcone. He was then promoted and sent to Palermo where he served as deputy chief of the Judicial police. In 1982 he worked on the streets of Palermo together with the agent Calogero Zucchetto, in the context of Cosa Nostra's inquiries. On one of these occasions Cassarà and Zucchetto recognized the two top killers Pino Greco and Mario Prestifilippo, but they could not arrest them because they fled. Among the numerous operations he took part in, many of which together with Commissioner Giuseppe Montana, there is the famous Pizza Connection operation in collaboration with U.S. police forces. Cassarà was a close associate of Giovanni Falcone and the so-called Antimafia pool of the Republic Prosecutor's Office of Palermo, and his investigations contributed to the groundwork of the first Maxi Trial. Married and father of three children, he was killed by the Mafia in 1985, at the age of 38.

== Death ==
On the afternoon of August 6, 1985, he was returning to his home in Viale della Croce Rossa 81 in Palermo in an Alfa Romeo Alfetta together with two escort officers. As he walked out the car and was walking to the front door of his home, a group of hitmen armed with AK-47 rifles, headed by Giuseppe Greco, Antonino Madonia and Giuseppe Giacomo Gambino, opened fire from the windows of an apartment building next to his home killing Cassarà and his colleague while the driver survived the ambush by hiding under the car. Police officer Roberto Antiochia, (aged 23 years old), which had just come out of the car to open the door for Cassarà, was instantly struck by the gunshots and fell in front of the entrance door dying immediately. Natale Mondo, the officer who survived (who was behind the wheel of the car), remained unharmed by succeeding in taking cover under the car (he was killed in a ambush on January 14, 1988 inside his wife store). Cassarà, was hit by the killers almost simultaneously with Antiochia and died inside the entrance hall in the arms of his wife Laura, who saw the ambush with their daughter from the balcony of their home. Antonino Cassarà is buried in the Sant'Orsola Cemetery in Palermo. After the assassination (or in the meanwhile) his notebook, which was assumed to contain important information, disappeared from his office.

On February 17, 1995, the tribunal of Palermo sentenced life imprisonment to five members of the Cupola (Totò Riina, Bernardo Provenzano, Michele Greco, Bernardo Brusca and Francesco Madonia) in connection of the crime.

== See also ==
- List of victims of the Sicilian Mafia
- Paolo Borsellino
- Rocco Chinnici
- Gaetano Costa
- Boris Giuliano
- Giuseppe Montana
- Carlo Alberto Dalla Chiesa
- Il Capo dei Capi
