= Fortugno =

Fortugno is an Italian surname. Notable people with the surname include:

- Francesco Fortugno (1951–2005), Italian politician
- Tim Fortugno (born 1962), American baseball player and scout
