= Antonino Saetta =

Italian magistrate

Antonino Saetta (25 October 1922 – 25 September 1988) was an Italian magistrate who prosecuted several high-profile cases involving organized crime in Sicily. He and his son, Stefano, were assassinated by members of the Sicilian mafia in 1988.

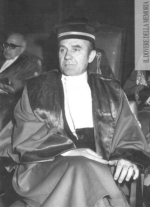
Antonino Saetta

== Biography ==
=== Origins and education ===
The third of five children, Saetta was born in Canicatti, Sicily. After graduating from the state high school of Caltanissetta (a liceo classico) he enrolled in the Faculty of Law at the University of Palermo, graduating with honors in 1944. He won the election for Judicial Auditor and entered the Magistracy in 1948.

=== Career ===
After law school, Saetta's first assignment was in Acqui Terme as court praetor and later as investigating judge. He served as a court judge in Caltanissetta (1955-1960) and in Palermo (1960-1969), then as the attorney of the Republic for the Court of Sciacca (1969-1971), before returning to Palermo as a counselor for the Court of Appeals.

From 1976 to 1978, he was counselor for the Court d'Assises in Genoa, where he prosecuted cases of national interest including those involving the Red Brigades and the seagull arson.

From 1985 to 1986, he was President of the Court d'Assises in Caltanissetta. During this time, he handled his first significant mafia trial in which Sicilian mafia leader Michele Greco was accused of multiple murders. Saetta successfully litigated the case, which ended in Judge Rocco Chinnici upholding Greco's original conviction and sentence. After the trial, Saetta returned to Palermo where he served as President of section I of the Court d'Assises and prosecuted other important mafia cases. One of the cases involved the killing of Emanuele Basile, a captain in the Carabinieri (Italian police force), by mafia members Armando Bonanno and Giuseppe Madonia.

=== Death ===
On 25 September 1988, a few months after the trial concluded, and a few days after Bonanno and Madonia were recommended for lifetime prison terms, Saetta and his son, Stefano, were murdered. The murders took place around midnight on Caltanissetta-Agrigento Road, as the Saettas were driving back to Palermo after attending a grandchild's baptism in Canicattì. Saetta was driving a grey Lancia Prisma and the killers met them on the road in a stolen BMW. Two 9-caliber machine guns were used to fire 47 shots, some delivered after Saetta's car had already crashed into the guardrail. After the killing, the BMW was taken to a site about two kilometers away and set on fire in an attempt to destroy evidence.

Antonino Saetta was buried in Canicatti cemetery.

== Investigations and trials ==
In 1996, the Court d'Assises of Caltanissetta sentenced Salvatore Riina, Francesco Madonia and Pietro Ribisi to life imprisonment for the double murder of Saetta and his son. The sentences were upheld in subsequent follow-up trials. Three others involved in the killing—Michele Montagna, Nicola Brancato, and Giuseppe Di Caro—were no longer available to stand trial because they had all died by 1995.

The assassination was considered to be a favor to Palermo mafia bosses Riina and Madonia carried out by the Agrigento clans. The motive was threefold: punishing a magistrate who took a hardline approach to prosecuting the mafia in the Basile and Chinnici trials, and who did not succumb to mafia pressure; sending a warning message to other judicial magistrates who were involved in active mafia trials; and preventing the appointment of another anti-mafia magistrate to serve as President of the Maxiprocesso court of appeals.

== Legacy ==
Saetta is remembered every year on 21 March on the Day of Memory and Commitment of Libera, the network of associations against the mafia. On this date, the group reads the long list of the names of the mafia's victims. The garrison of Libera di Acqui Terme, where Saetta started his career, is dedicated to him and his son.

Some reports incorrectly stated that Stefano Saetta was severely disabled, and the film Law of Courage depicted him in a vegetative state. In fact, at the time of his death, Stefano was a young, healthy athlete who excelled at swimming. As an adolescent, he suffered from mental health issues that forced him to leave school and be declared as a 'civil invalidity'; however, his symptoms did not continue into adulthood, and he appeared cured. The discovery of his 'invalidity card' among his documents led some reporters to mistakenly misrepresent his health status.

The double murder was the subject of the 2020 documentary, L'Abbraccio. Storia di Antonino e Stefano Saetta, written and directed by Davide Lorenzano, produced by Cristian Patanè, with cinematography by Daniele Ciprì. The film traces Saetta's career and public persona, as well as his personal life, including his relationship with his son Stefano. The film includes interviews with family, friends and colleagues such as Antonino Di Matteo, who investigated and tried the case, which resulted in lifetime prison sentences for the defendants.
