= Gaetano Costa =

Italian magistrate

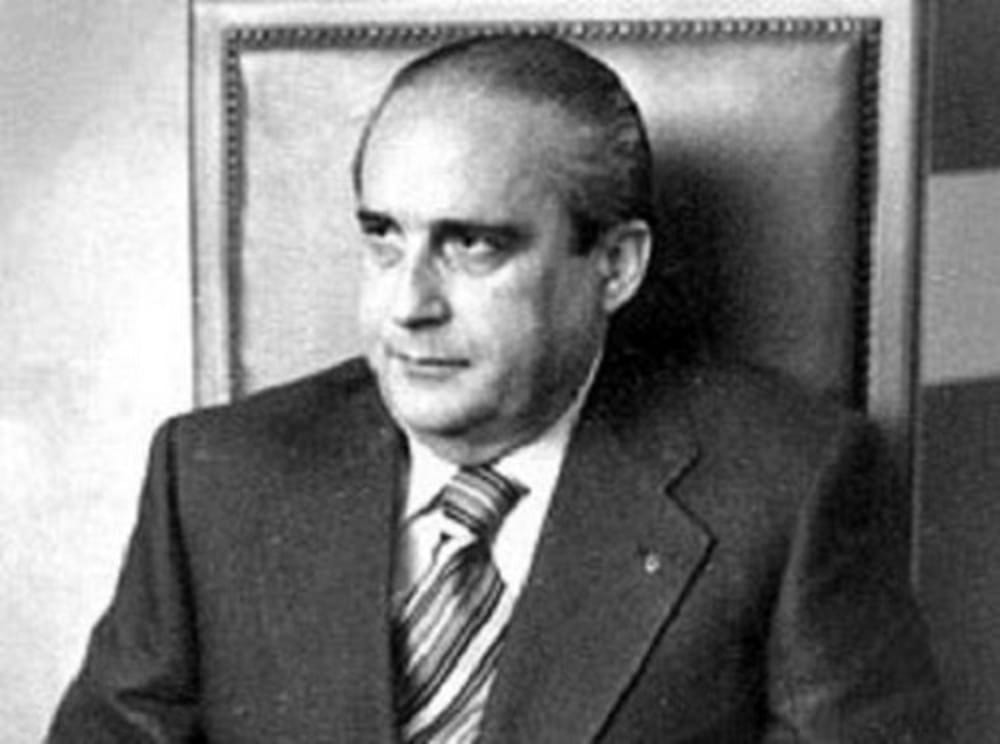
Gaetano Costa

Gaetano Costa (Italian pronunciation: [ɡaeˈtaːno ˈkɔsta]; Caltanissetta, 1 March 1916 - Palermo, 6 August 1980) was an Italian magistrate killed by the Cosa Nostra.

Chief Prosecutor of Palermo, he was assassinated by the Mafia on 6 August 1980 while browsing books on a stall located on a sidewalk in Via Cavour in Palermo, a few steps from his home. He was hit with three gunshots to his back by two killers on a motorcycle. The murder was ordered by the Mafia clan headed by Salvatore Inzerillo due to Costa signing the arrest orders against boss Rosario Spatola and some of his men while other colleagues of his refused to sign.

== Life ==
Gaetano Costa was born in Caltanissetta. He graduated in law at the University of Palermo. As a boy, during the Fascist regime, he joined the then clandestine Italian Communist Party. After winning the competitive examination in the magistracy, he was enlisted as an officer of the Regia Aeronautica and obtained two War Crosses. Following the 8 September 1943, he reached the Susa valley and joined the Italian Resistance.

He was put into service in the Magistracy, before in the tribunal of Rome and then, at his request, he was transferred to the Republic Prosecutor Office of Caltanissetta where he remained from 1944 to 1978.

In the Prosecutor's Office, he spent most of his magistrate activities as a deputy prosecutor before and chief prosecutor then, always giving clear demonstrations of high professional preparation, independence and balance. Since the 1960s, as evidenced by his deposition at the first Antimafia Commission, he realized that the Mafia had undergone a radical mutation and that it had nested in the vital ganglia of public administration by controlling its procurement, recruitment and management in general. In the case of Peppino Impastato, he was the first to realize that it was not terrorism or suicide but a mafia crime. In the brief period of his administration, the Prosecutor's Office of Palermo started a series of delicate investigations in which, even with limited resources at the time, he tried to hit the Mafia's patrimonial sanctuaries.

== Death ==
A substitute of him wrote that he was a man "of whom only death could be bought". At 19:30, on 6 August 1980, he bled to death on the sidewalk of Via Cavour in Palermo. Only a few magistrates attended his funeral. Although he was the only magistrate in Palermo to have a bullet proof car and an escort had been assigned to at the time, he did not use it as he felt that his protection would endanger others and that he was one of those who "had the duty to have courage". No one was convicted for his death even though the tribunal of Catania found the context identifying it in the grey area between business, politics and organized crime. His commitment was continued by Rocco Chinnici, Giovanni Falcone and Paolo Borsellino then among the few who understood and shared his intentions and action. The three created the Antimafia pool in which would be included other prosecutors like Giuseppe Ayala, Giuseppe Di Lello and Leonardo Guarnotta given that had learned with Costa's killing "who investigate by their own, their investigations are silenced when they're killed". Chinnici, Falcone and Borsellino would later be killed as well.

== See also ==
- List of victims of the Sicilian Mafia
- Giovanni Falcone
- Paolo Borsellino
- Carlo Alberto Dalla Chiesa
- Ninni Cassarà
- Il Capo dei Capi
