= Ammazzateci tutti =

Ammazzateci Tutti
- The first public manifestation of Ammazzateci tutti at the funeral of Francesco Fortugno on 19 October 2005 in Locri. The sign writes: And Now, Kill Us all. (Photo: Adriana Sapone)
- Founded: October 2005 by Aldo Pecora in Italy
- Type: Non-profit
- Services: Education to legality
- Website: www.killusall.org

Ammazzateci tutti (Italian for "Kill Us All") is an Italian Antimafia social movement created in Locri, Calabria (South of Italy) at the end of 2005 by Aldo Pecora, the spokesperson of the movement. The movement is also known as "Ragazzi di Locri" (Kids from Locri) because it is composed principally of young high school and university students.

The movement emerged when Francesco Fortugno, a centre-left politician and deputy president of the regional parliament, was killed by the 'Ndrangheta on 16 October 2005 in Locri. The first public manifestation of the movement was at the funeral of Fortugno on 19 October 2005, with a banner And Now Kill Us All.

Ammazzateci Tutti played a key role in organizing the largest popular demonstration ever in Locri on 4 November 2005. The event was attended by over 15,000 people, mainly by putting online the website www.ammazzatecitutti.org, which registered more than 200.000 contacts in one week.

"Ammazzateci tutti is a message that expresses both hope and challenge to the 'Ndrangheta, saying 'See if you have enough lead to kill us all,' " according to Pecora. "It's also a challenge to normal people to rebel against the 'Ndrangheta." Since its founding, Ammazzateci tutti has held regular demonstrations designed to pressure the Italian state into taking action against the 'Ndrangheta.

President and national spokesman of the movement is Aldo Pecora. The national coordination of the movement is led by Rosanna Scopelliti, daughter of the magistrate Antonino Scopelliti, killed by the 'Ndrangheta in August 1991. The movement uses a phrase of the Calabrian writer Corrado Alvaro to depict the spirit of the movement : "The worst desperation of a society is the doubt that living honestly is useless."

As a youth movement, Ammazzateci Tutti uses modern media techniques such as YouTube and Facebook to get their message across.
