= Misilmeri =

Misilmeri Musulumeli (Sicilian)
- Comune
- Comune di Misilmeri
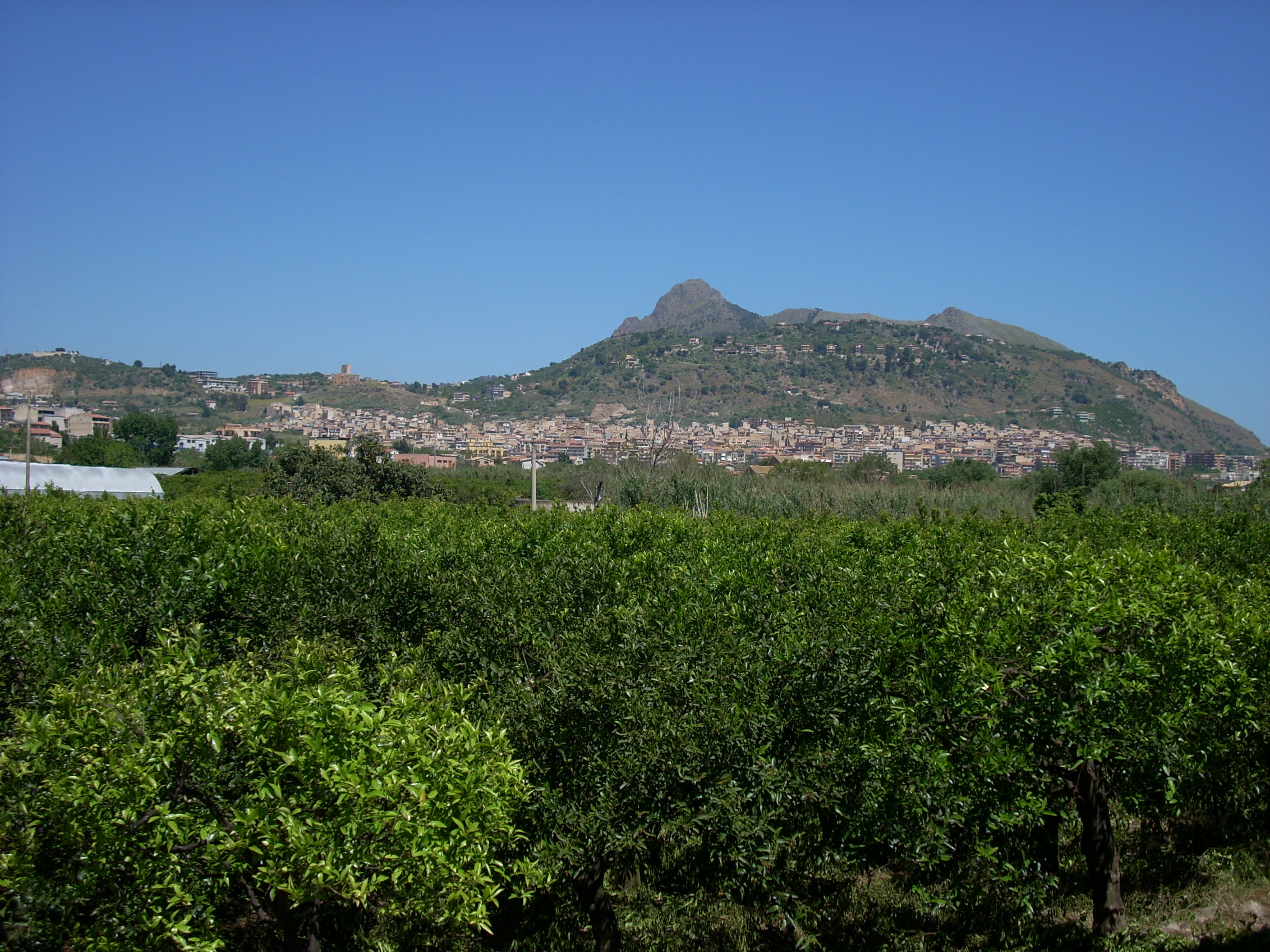

- Coat of arms

- Location within Italy Location within Sicily
- Coordinates: 38°2′5″N 13°27′5″E
- Country: Italy
- Region: Sicily
- Metropolitan city: Palermo (PA)
- Frazioni: Gibilrossa, Portella di Mare

Government
  - Mayor: Rosalia Stadarelli

Area
  - Total: 69.49 km^{2} (26.83 sq mi)
- Elevation: 129 m (423 ft)

Population (31 December 2017)
  - Total: 29,375
  - Density: 422.7/km^{2} (1,095/sq mi)
- Demonym: Misilmeresi
- Time zone: UTC+1 (CET)
  - Summer (DST): UTC+2 (CEST)
- Postal code: 90036
- Dialing code: 091
- Patron saint: Justus of Cagliari
- Saint day: Last Sunday of August
- Website: www.comune.misilmeri.pa.it

Misilmeri (Sicilian: Musulumeli) is a town and comune (municipality) in the Metropolitan City of Palermo, Sicily, Italy. It is approximately 15 kilometres (9 mi) from Palermo, and is located in the Eleuterio Valley on the southern slopes of Montagna Grande.

Misilmeri dates from the Muslim emirate of Sicily: the village rose around a castle (today known as Castello dell'Emiro, or "Castle of the Emir") founded by emir Jafar II (998–1019). Its name derives from Arabic Manzil al-Amīr (منزل الأمير), meaning "the resting place / messuage of the Emir". In 1068, the Battle of Misilmeri was fought between the Normans and Arabs.

Misilmeri is the birthplace of the magistrate Rocco Chinnici.
