= Geraci =

Geraci may refer to:

- Geraci (surname), people and fictional characters with the name
- Geraci Siculo, a comune (municipality) in the Province of Palermo in Sicily
