= Gibilrossa =

- Frazione
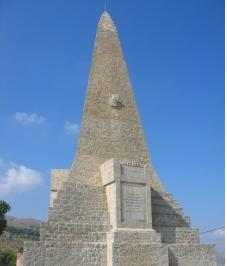
- Obelisk in Gibilrossa

- Location of Gibilrossa in Italy
- Coordinates: 38°03′28″N 13°25′54″E
- Country: Italy
- Region: Sicily
- Metropolitan city: Palermo (PA)
- Comune: Misilmeri
- Elevation: 395 m (1,296 ft)

Population (2011)
  - Total: 77
- Demonym: Gibilrossini
- Time zone: UTC+1 (CET)
  - Summer (DST): UTC+2 (CEST)
- Postal code: 90036
- Dialing code: (+39) 091

Gibilrossa is a small town in northern Sicily, Italy. It is a frazione (borough) of the municipality of Misilmeri, in the Metropolitan City of Palermo.

Located at some 400 metres (1,300 ft) of altitude, its name derives from Arabic jabal raʾs (جبل رأس) meaning "chief mountain" or "great mountain".

The town is famous for having been used as a stronghold by the troops of Giuseppe Garibaldi and Nino Bixio for their conquest of Palermo in 1860 during the Expedition of the Thousand. An obelisk in the town commemorates the event.
