= Rosario Livatino =

Italian judge killed by the Stidda (1952–1990)

Blessed Rosario Livatino
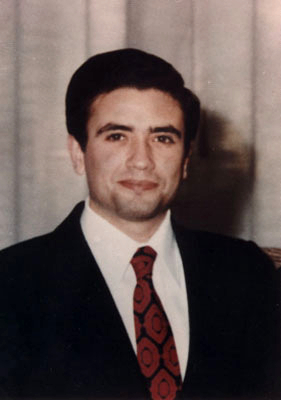

Martyr
- Born: Rosario Angelo Livatino; 3 October 1952; Canicattì, Sicily, Italy
- Died: 21 September 1990 (aged 37); Between Canicattì and Agrigento, Sicily, Italy
- Venerated in: Roman Catholic Church
- Beatified: 9 May 2021, Agrigento Cathedral, Agrigento, Italy by Cardinal Marcello Semeraro
- Feast: 29 October

Rosario Angelo Livatino (Italian pronunciation: [roˈzaːrjo livaˈtiːno]; 3 October 1952 – 21 September 1990) was an Italian magistrate who was murdered by the Stidda, a Sicilian Mafia-type criminal organization, and Beatified by the Catholic Church.

== Biography ==
Livatino was born in Canicattì, Sicily. After successfully completing high school, he entered the Law Faculty of the University of Palermo in 1971, and graduated in 1975. Between 1977 and 1978, he served as vice-director of the Register Office in Agrigento. In 1978, after being among the top percentage in the Judiciary audit, he was made magistrate at the court at Caltanissetta.

In 1979, he became sostituto procuratore (deputy prosecutor) at the Agrigento court, a position he kept until 1989, when he was appointed giudice a latere (assistant judge). During his career, Livatino worked against corruption, and won a number of cases, obtaining seizure of large sums of money and property, and the arrests of senior organised crime figures.

On 21 September 1990, Livatino was murdered along route SS 640 as he drove to court without bodyguards. The four assassins had been paid by the Stidda of Agrigento. His story inspired a novel, Il giudice ragazzino ("The Boy Judge"), written by Nando Dalla Chiesa in 1992. This was made into a film of the same name in 1994 by director Alessandro Di Robilant.

== Beatification process ==
In 1993, the Bishop of Agrigento asked Livatino's former teacher, Ida Abate, to collect any available testimony for Livatino's beatification. On 19 July 2011, the Archbishop of Agrigento, Francesco Montenegro, signed the decree to begin the diocesan process of beatification, which was officially opened on 21 September 2011 in the Church of San Domenico in Canicattì.

During the diocesan phase, 45 individuals testified to the life and sanctity of Livatino, including Gaetano Puzzangaro, one of the judge's four killers. He was interviewed in prison by Canicattì journalist Fabio Marchese Ragona for the weekly magazine Panorama in December 2017, and for TGcom24 in September 2019.

The diocesan process for Livatino’s beatification was declared closed on 6 September 2018, marked with a solemn Mass on 3 October by Cardinal Francesco Montenegro in the Church of Sant'Alfonso in Agrigento. Afterwards, all 4,000 pages of documents and testimonies were sent to Rome for examination by the Congregation for the Causes of Saints. Pope John Paul II had commented Livatino was a "Martyr of Justice and in an indirect way, of the Christian Faith".

In December 2020, Pope Francis approved the decree of martyrdom proposed by the Congregation for the Causes of Saints. Then-Servant of God Rosario Angelo Livatino was officially proclaimed Blessed on Sunday, 9 May 2021, in Agrigento Cathedral by Cardinal Marcello Semeraro, Prefect of the Congregation for the Causes of Saints. On the same date in 1993, Pope John Paul II declared in the Valley of the Temples to the Mafia: "Be converted! One day the judgment of God will come!" Livatino is the first magistrate to be declared “Blessed” by the Catholic Church.

At the request of the Archdiocese of Agrigento and his birthplace of Canicattì, Livatino’s body was translated on 15 March 2025 from his family mausoleum in the municipal cemetery to the Church of Santa Chiara. His remains are encased within his effigy, dressed in judicial robes and contained in a glass casket, while another relic is the blood-soaked shirt he wore when he was killed, kept in a separate reliquary.

== Rosario Livatino Study Center ==
In 2015, the Centro Studio Rosario Livatino (Rosario Livatino Study Center) was established, a think tank comprising jurists whose research focuses are the right to life, the family, religious freedom, and the limits of jurisdiction within a framework of institutional balance. The Center maintains an online website, organizes periodic workshops, and an annual conference. It also publishes the semi-annual law review l-Jus, analysing legal topics from Catholic and Thomistic perspectives.

== See also ==
- List of victims of the Sicilian Mafia
