= Francesco Fortugno =

Italian politician and the Vice President (1951 - 2005)

Francesco Fortugno

Francesco Fortugno (Italian pronunciation: [franˈtʃesko forˈtuɲɲo]; Brancaleone, 15 September 1951 – Locri, 16 October 2005) was an Italian politician and the Vice President of the Regional Assembly of Calabria. He was killed by the 'Ndrangheta in October 2005, in Locri, a hotbed of 'Ndrangheta activity.

== Death ==
Fortugno was a physician by profession and represented the centre-left Margherita party in the regional legislature. He was known for his appeals to young Calabrians to fight the 'Ndrangheta. He was gunned down with five bullets in front of dozens of bystanders as he cast his vote at the primary elections of the centre-left coalition Unione. The masked attacker strolled calmly through the exit of the local polling station to a waiting car.

Students spontaneously took to the streets in protest the day after Fortugno's killing. One banner read, E adesso Ammazzateci tutti (And Now Kill Us All), and many carried white sheets as a symbol of protest against the omertà, or silence, that protects the mafia. The killing triggered the birth of the Ammazzateci tutti movement against the 'Ndrangheta. The funeral of Fortugno, on 19 October 2005, was attended by 8,000 people.

== Investigating 'Ndrangheta penetration of health care system ==
His assassination is thought to have something to do with the 'Ndrangheta's efforts to penetrate the local health authority. He was investigating the awarding of hospital contracts in the Calabrian healthcare system.

In March 2006, police arrested several alleged members of the Cordì family—a leading clan of the 'Ndrangheta—including the suspected current boss, Vincenzo Cordì, and Salvatore Ritorto, believed to have pulled the trigger in the killing of Fortugno.

The investigation into the killing benefited from the declarations of Bruno Piccolo, a bar-owner from Locri and a member of the 'Ndrangheta. Piccolo had helped identify the men who ordered and carried out the murder. Though the state guaranteed him police protection, Piccolo paid a high price for his co-operation. Piccolo allegedly committed suicide. His body was found one day before the second anniversary of the murder of Fortugno.

== Murder convictions ==
On 2 February 2009, four men received life sentences for the 2005 murder of Fortugno. Alessandro Marcianò and his son Giuseppe were convicted of ordering the killing, while Salvatore Ritorto was found guilty of being the gunman. The fourth man, Domenico Audino, was judged to have been an accomplice.

Fortugno was murdered so that Domenico Crea, a Christian Democrat member of the regional assembly, could take his place, according to investigators. But the politician was found to be unaware of the 'Ndrangheta's backing and was not prosecuted. The killing took place against the backdrop of a web of suspicious relations through which the 'Ndrangheta was able to manipulate contracts and appointments in the regional health services. Crea was arrested in 2008 in relation to investigations concerning the health system.
