= Antonino Scopelliti =

Italian prosecuting magistrate murdered on behalf of the Sicilian Mafia in 1991

Antonino Scopelliti (Italian pronunciation: [antoˈniːno skopelˈliːti]; Campo Calabro, 20 January 1935 – Piale, 9 August 1991) was an Italian prosecuting magistrate, murdered by the 'Ndrangheta on behalf of the Sicilian Mafia.

He was a prosecutor at the Italian Supreme Court (Corte di Cassazione). While on holiday visiting his family in Calabria, he was ambushed on a road on 9 August 1991. At the time he was preparing to argue the government’s case in the final appeal of the Maxi Trial against Cosa Nostra for the Supreme Court. The reason for the killing was to hold up the trial so that the Mafia bosses' legal terms of detention would expire and they would be freed.

The crime still remains unsolved. Two trials were held at the Court of Reggio Calabria against Mafia boss Salvatore Riina and thirteen of the so-called Sicilian Mafia Commission, and a second trial against Bernardo Provenzano and nine other bosses of the Commission, including Filippo and Giuseppe Graviano, Raffaele Ganci, Giuseppe Farinella, Antonino Giuffrè and Nitto Santapaola. All were convicted at first instance in 1996 and 1998 and subsequently acquitted in the Court of Appeals in 1998 and 2000 because the testimonies of the seventeen government witnesses were conflicting.

His daughter Rosanna Scopelliti is the national coordinator of Ammazzateci tutti (Italian for "Kill Us All"), an Italian Antimafia social movement created in Locri, Calabria (South of Italy) at the end of 2005 against the 'Ndrangheta.

== See also ==
- List of victims of the Sicilian Mafia
