= Tommaso Geraci =

Italian sculptor (1931–2020)

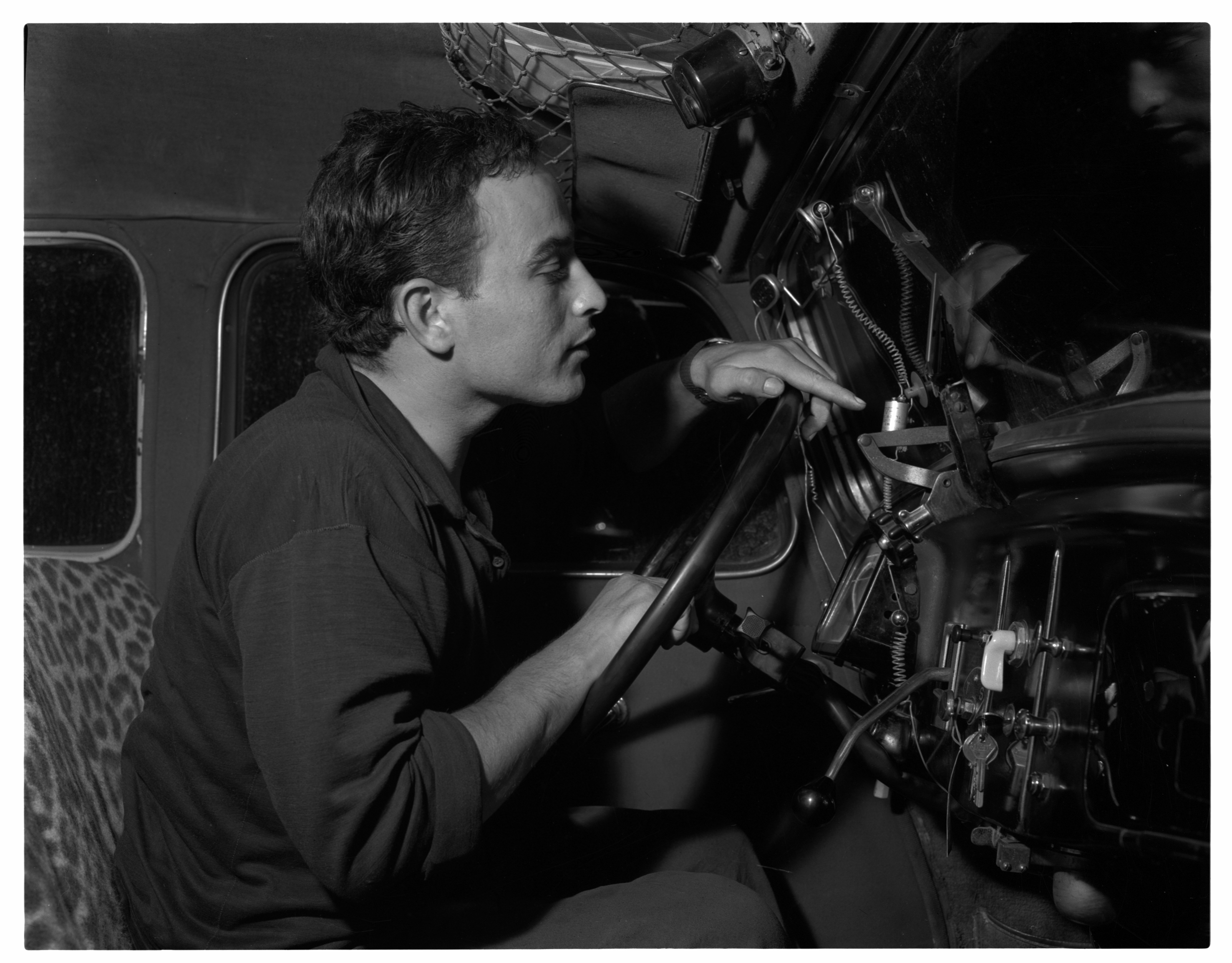
Portrait of sculptor Tomasso Geraci, 1960

Tommaso Geraci (29 June 1931 – 26 August 2020) was an Italian sculptor, worked in the Sicilian town of Cefalù.

== Life & work ==
Born in Sclafani Bagni, Sicily, Geraci graduated from the Rotterdam Academy of Fine Arts in Rotterdam, Netherlands in fine arts and sculpture, spending a year of his studies at the Brera Academy of Fine Arts in Milan, Italy.

Geraci was awarded the Italian national honour of Cavaliere dell'Ordine della stella della Solidarietà Italiana (Knight of the Order of the Star of Italian Solidarity) in 1974.

Since graduating, Geraci became well known for his sculpture, working mainly in bronze. Many of his works are symbolic, drawing on the lessons of mythology, promoting humanity, and frequently take the form of circular plaques or medallions, small and large.

Works include the 1.9 m (6 ft) diameter bronze plaque at Palermo International Airport in memory of anti-mafia judges Giovanni Falcone and Paolo Borsellino, and a 9 m high statue of Saint Pio of Pietrelcina at Poggio Maria, Cefalù.

His works are known to be found in Denmark, Netherlands (including a monument in Leersum to the space age following the launch of Sputnik 1), Italy, and the Vatican. Geraci died on 26 August 2020 at the age of 89.
