= Antonino Caponnetto =

Italian Antimafia magistrate

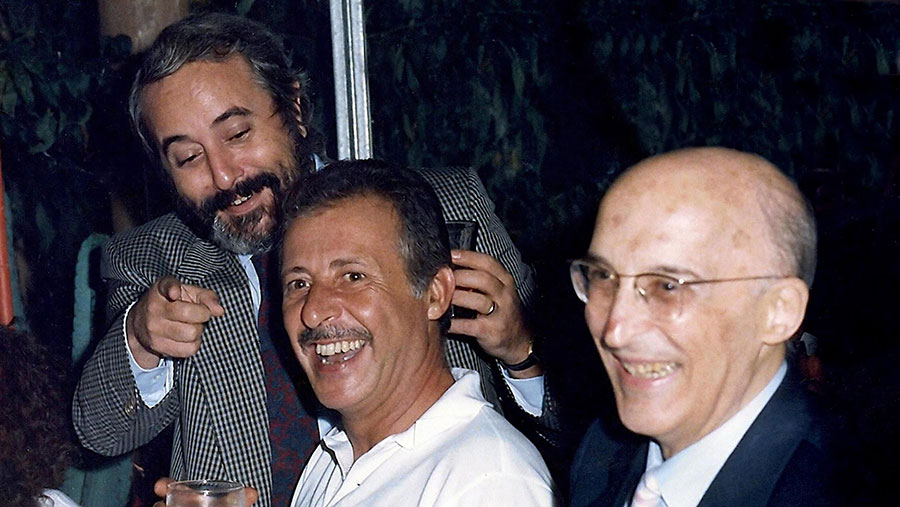
- Antonino Caponnetto (right) with Giovanni Falcone and Paolo Borsellino
- Born: 5 September 1920; Messina, Sicily, Italy
- Died: 6 December 2002 (aged 82); Florence, Tuscany, Italy
- Occupation: Antimafia magistrate

Antonino Caponnetto (5 September 1920 – 6 December 2002) was an Italian Antimafia magistrate.

== Biography ==
Caponnetto was born in Caltanissetta in 1920. His career began in 1954 in Florence, but he became famous only in 1983, after Rocco Chinnici's assassination, when he took over his job in Palermo. Under his lead, the Antimafia pool of magistrates came to organise the first grand trial against the Mafia. The pool included magistrates such as Chinnici, Paolo Borsellino, Giovanni Falcone, Giuseppe Di Lello and Leonardo Guarnotta.

He retired in 1990, and thereafter engaged in political activities supporting legality and social justice. In 1999 he organised the first "Legality meeting", an annual event that gathers journalists, magistrates and civil associations. The meetings are still held today.

He died from natural causes in 2002 in Florence.

== Orders ==
- 2nd Class / Knight: Cavaliere Ordine al Merito della Repubblica Italiana: 2 June 1983

== See also ==
Sicilian Center of Documentation
