= Maxi Trial =

1989–92 criminal trial against the Mafia in Palermo, Sicily

Coordinates: 38°08′00″N 13°21′30″E

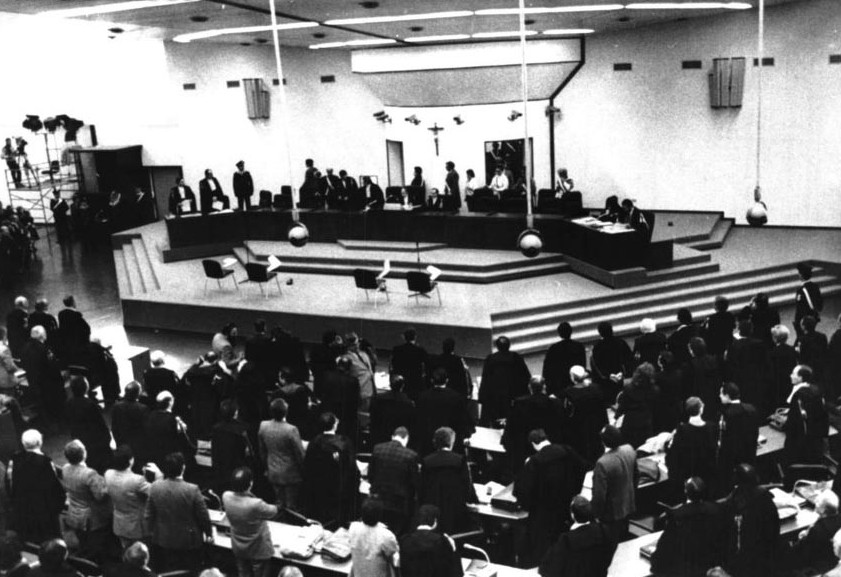
A hearing of the Maxi Trial

The Maxi Trial (Italian: Maxiprocesso) was a criminal trial against the Sicilian Mafia that took place in Palermo, Sicily. The trial lasted from 10 February 1986 (the first day of the Corte d'Assise) to 30 January 1992 (the final day of the Supreme Court of Cassation), and was held in a bunker-style courthouse specially constructed for this purpose inside the walls of the Ucciardone prison.

Sicilian prosecutors indicted 475 mafiosi for a multitude of crimes relating to Mafia activities, based primarily on the testimonies given by former Mafia bosses turned informants, known as pentiti, in particular Tommaso Buscetta and Salvatore Contorno. Most were convicted, 338 people, sentenced to a total of 2,665 years, not including life sentences handed to 19 bosses; the convictions were upheld on 30 January 1992 by the Supreme Court of Italy, after the final stage of appeal. The importance of the trial was that the existence of Cosa Nostra - as a centralised, unitary and hierarchical organization based on shared rules and common goals - was finally judicially confirmed.

It is considered to be the most significant trial ever against the Sicilian Mafia, as well as the largest trial in world history. Throughout and after the trial, several judges and magistrates were killed by the Mafia, including the two who led it—Giovanni Falcone and Paolo Borsellino.

== Preceding events ==
In the early 1970s, Luciano Leggio was boss of the Corleonesi clan and a member of the Sicilian Mafia Commission, and he forged a coalition of mafia clans known as the Corleonesi with himself as its leader. He initiated a campaign to dominate Cosa Nostra and its narcotics trade. Leggio was imprisoned in 1974, so he acted through his deputy Salvatore Riina, to whom he eventually handed over control. The Corleonesi bribed cash-strapped Palermo clans into the fold, subverted members of other clans, and secretly recruited new members. In 1977, the Corleonesi had Gaetano Badalamenti expelled from the Commission on trumped-up charges of hiding drug revenue.

In April 1981, the Corleonesi murdered rival member of the Commission Stefano Bontade, and the Second Mafia War began in earnest. Hundreds of enemy mafiosi and their relatives were murdered, sometimes by traitors in their own clans. By manipulating the Mafia's rules and eliminating rivals, the Corleonesi came to completely dominate the Commission. Riina used his power over the Commission to replace the bosses of certain clans with hand-picked regents. In the end, the Corleonesi faction won and Riina effectively became the "boss of bosses" of the Sicilian Mafia. At the same time that the Corleonesi waged their campaign to dominate Cosa Nostra, they also waged a campaign of murder against journalists, officials, and policemen who dared to cross them. The police were frustrated with the lack of help that they were receiving from witnesses and politicians. At the funeral of a policeman murdered by mafiosi in 1985, policemen insulted and spat on two attending politicians, and a fight broke out between them and military police, the carabinieri.

On 31 March 1980, politician Pio La Torre initiated a draft law that introduced a new crime in the Italian legal system, mafia conspiracy, and the possibility for the courts to seize and confiscate the goods of the persons belonging to the mafia conspiracy. With the inclusion of the mafia conspiracy in article 416 bis of the Italian Penal Code, a serious gap was filled. In spite of its obvious danger, mafia conspiracy had not been recognized by the Penal Code as a criminal phenomenon. As a result, many judges had not considered the Mafia a criminal association. The provisions contained in article 416 of the Penal Code concerning mafia-type association were suitable to cope with local and limited phenomena of associated delinquency, but not with organized crime.

The groundwork for the Maxi Trial was done at the preliminary investigative phase by Palermo's Antimafia Pool, created by judge Rocco Chinnici and consisting of Giovanni Falcone, Paolo Borsellino, Giuseppe Di Lello and Leonardo Guarnotta. After Chinnici's murder in July 1983, his successor Antonino Caponnetto headed the pool. The Antimafia pool was a group of investigating magistrates who closely worked together sharing information on related cases to diffuse responsibility and to prevent one person from becoming the sole institutional memory and solitary target. They would carry out all the investigations on Cosa Nostra, assisted by the deputy prosecutor Giuseppe Ayala and three colleagues, whose task was also to bring the results of the pool investigations as prosecutors and obtain convictions.

== Pentiti ==
Tommaso Buscetta (in sunglasses) is led into court at the Maxi Trial.

Most of the crucial evidence came from Tommaso Buscetta. In February 1980, he was granted "half-freedom" from prison, immediately fleeing back to Brazil to escape the brewing Second Mafia War instigated by Salvatore Riina. On 11 September 1982, Buscetta's two sons from his first wife, Benedetto and Antonio, disappeared, never to be found again, which prompted his collaboration with Italian authorities. This was followed by the deaths of his brother Vincenzo, son-in-law Giuseppe Genova, brother-in-law Pietro and four of his nephews, Domenico and Benedetto Buscetta, and Orazio and Antonio D'Amico. The war subsequently led to the deaths of many of Buscetta's allies, including Stefano Bontade. Buscetta was arrested in São Paulo, Brazil once again on 23 October 1983. He was extradited to Italy on 28 June 1984, where he attempted suicide by ingestion of barbiturates; when that failed, he decided that he was utterly disillusioned with the Mafia. Buscetta asked to talk to the anti-Mafia judge Giovanni Falcone, and began his life as an informant, referred to as a pentito.

Buscetta revealed information to Falcone for 45 days, explaining the inner workings and hierarchical structures of Cosa Nostra including the Sicilian Mafia Commission, that, until then, were unclear because of the strict code of silence. This became known as the "Buscetta theorem". However, Buscetta refused to speak with Falcone of the political ties of Cosa Nostra because, in his opinion, the State was not ready for statements of that magnitude, and proved to be quite general on that subject.

Mobster Salvatore Contorno was arrested in 1982. At first he refused to collaborate with Ninni Cassarà and Falcone. After the decision of Buscetta to collaborate, Contorno changed his mind. According to some, Buscetta met Contorno who supposedly fell to his knees and kissed Buscetta's hand. Buscetta allegedly put his hand on his shoulder and said: "It's all right, Totuccio, you can talk." Contorno began collaborating in October 1984, and a week later 127 arrest warrants were issued against mafiosi.

== Defendants and trial ==
After the preliminary investigations were concluded, on 8 November 1985, judge Antonino Caponnetto issued indictments for the Maxi Trial entitled "Abbate Giovanni + 706". The indictment was about 8,000 pages long and evaluated the position of 707 suspects. Of these, 476 were sent to trial. The number then dropped to 475, as Nino Salvo died from cancer in January 1986, and 231 more were acquitted.

After several years of investigating by the Antimafia pool, the trial began on 10 February 1986. The presiding judge was Alfonso Giordano, flanked by two other judges who were 'alternates', should anything fatal happen to Giordano before the end of what was to be a lengthy trial. The charges faced by the defendants included 120 murders, drug trafficking, extortion and the new law that made it an offence to be a member of the Mafia, the first time that law would be put to the test. The trial took place in an octagonal bunker-style structure that was built alongside the Ucciardone prison. It could house hundreds of people including defendants, witnesses, lawyers, politicians and police. It had a computerized system for archiving documents, and a structure that could withstand missile attacks.

It was considered to be the most significant trial ever against the Sicilian Mafia, as well as the largest trial in world history. A total of 475 defendants were facing charges, although 119 of them were to be tried in absentia as they were fugitives. Among the defendants present were Luciano Leggio, Pippo Calò and Michele Greco, who was arrested while the trial had already started; among those in absentia were Salvatore Riina, Bernardo Provenzano and Nitto Santapaola.

== Verdicts ==
The trial ended on 16 December 1987, almost two years after it commenced. The verdicts were announced, and of the 475 defendants—both those present and those tried in absentia—338 were convicted. 2,665 years of prison sentences were shared out between the guilty, not including the life sentences handed to the 19 leading Mafia bosses and killers, including Michele Greco, Giuseppe Marchese, Francesco Madonia, Salvatore Montalto, Francesco Spadaro, Antonino Sinagra, Antonino Marchese, Giuseppe Pullarà and Salvatore Rotolo, and—in absentia—Salvatore Riina, Giuseppe Lucchese, Bernardo Provenzano, Nitto Santapaola, Pietro Senapa, Vincenzo Sinagra, Pietro Vernengo, Giuseppe Greco, Rosario Riccobono and Filippo Marchese (the latter three were later determined to already be dead by lupara bianca).

== Appeals ==
The appeal process lasted over three years, and dozens of mobsters were acquitted on 10 December 1990. Antonino Saetta, a trial magistrate, had been killed with his son on 25 September 1988. On 9 August 1991, Antonino Scopelliti, who was preparing to argue the government's case in the final appeal of the trial, was murdered by the 'Ndrangheta on behalf of the Mafia.

The president of the first criminal section of the Court of Cassation was Corrado Carnevale, a judge suspected of colluding with the Mafia. However, Carnevale was not appointed as prosecutor and the final decision on the Maxi Trial, as he was replaced with judge Arnaldo Valente. Finally, on 30 January 1992, the convictions were confirmed by the Supreme Court of Cassation, and most of the acquittals granted by the appeals process were cancelled. Another trial was held between 1993 and 1995, and all the defendants were convicted to life imprisonment.

== Aftermath ==
As part of the Maxi Trial, Riina was given two life sentences in absentia. Riina pinned his hopes on the lengthy appeal process that had frequently set convicted mafiosi free, and he suspended the campaign of murders against officials while the cases went to higher courts. When the convictions were upheld by the Supreme Court of Cassation on 30 January 1992, the council of top bosses headed by Riina reacted by ordering the assassination of Salvatore Lima (on the grounds that he was an ally of Giulio Andreotti), and Falcone. On 23 May 1992, Falcone, his wife Francesca Morvillo and three police officers in their security detail died in the Capaci bombing on highway A29 outside Palermo. Two months later, Borsellino was killed along with five police officers at the entrance to his mother's apartment block by a car bomb in via D'Amelio. Both attacks were ordered by Riina. Ignazio Salvo, who had advised Riina against killing Falcone, was himself murdered on 17 September 1992. The public was outraged, both at the Mafia and also the politicians who they felt had failed adequately to protect Falcone and Borsellino. The Italian government arranged for a massive crackdown against the Mafia in response. On 15 January 1993, Carabinieri arrested Riina outside his villa in Palermo. He had been a fugitive for 23 years.

== Bibliography ==
- Dickie, John (2007). Cosa Nostra: A History of the Sicilian Mafia. St. Martin's Griffin. ISBN 978-1403970428.
- Schneider, Jane T. & Peter T. Schneider (2003). Reversible Destiny: Mafia, Antimafia, and the Struggle for Palermo, Berkeley: University of California Press ISBN 0-520-23609-2
