= Emanuele Basile =

Italian carabiniere

- Born: 2 July 1949; Taranto, Apulia, Italy
- Died: 4 May 1980 (aged 30); Monreale, Sicily, Italy
- Cause of death: Killed by the Sicilian Mafia
- Occupation: Captain of the Carabinieri
- Known for: Fight against the Mafia

Emanuele Basile (Italian pronunciation: [emanuˈɛːle baˈziːle]; July 2, 1949 – May 4, 1980) was an Italian captain of the Carabinieri and a collaborator of Paolo Borsellino on anti-Mafia investigations. He was killed by Cosa Nostra in Monreale, Palermo, shot repeatedly in the back whilst he carried his four-year-old daughter, who was unhurt in the shooting. He was working with Borsellino on traffic of heroin and killings related to Mafia in Corleone at the time of his death. The investigation on his murder was headed by Borsellino.

The hit team was made up by Vincenzo Puccio, Armando Bonanno and Giuseppe Madonia of the Resuttana Mafia family, with logistical support from Giovanni Brusca.

On 14 November 1992, Salvatore Riina and Francesco Madonia were sentenced to life imprisonment for the murder.

== Sources ==
- http://digilander.libero.it/inmemoria/borsellino_biografia.htm
- http://digilander.libero.it/inmemoria/delitti_della_mafia.htm
- https://web.archive.org/web/20051226100445/http://www.testimonideltempo.it/contenuti/paoloborsellino.asp
- https://web.archive.org/web/20051122195846/http://www.frosinone.org/oltreloccidente/testi_oo/f302_stille.htm
