= Antimafia Pool =

Group of investigating magistrates in Italy

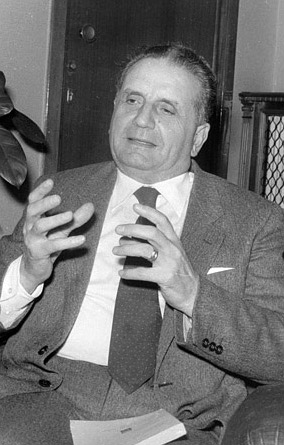
Rocco Chinnici, the initiator of the Antimafia Pool

Giovanni Falcone and Paolo Borsellino in March 1992. This image of the two assassinated judges, seen on posters and articles after their deaths, has since become an icon in the struggle against the Mafia.

The Antimafia Pool was a group of examining magistrates at the Prosecuting Office of Palermo, Sicily, who closely worked together sharing information and developing new investigative and prosecutorial strategies against the Sicilian Mafia. An informal pool was created by Judge Rocco Chinnici in the early 1980s following the example of anti-terrorism judges in Northern Italy in the 1970s.

Above all, they took on collective responsibility for pressing forward with Mafia prosecutions: every member of the pool co-signed prosecutorial orders so that no single magistrate would bear the particular danger that had proved fatal to Judge Gaetano Costa. Costa had put his signature to the indictments of 55 defendants from the heroin-trafficking network of the Spatola-Inzerillo-Gambino clan after nearly all his fellow prosecutors had refused to sign. News of this isolation leaked out of his office, and it ultimately led to his murder. He was killed on 6 August 1980, on the orders of Mafia boss Salvatore Inzerillo.

== Antimafia law ==
The pool skilfully applied the provisions of a new Antimafia law, generally known as the Rognoni-La Torre Law, that had been instigated by the communist deputy Pio La Torre and had been passed after the Mafia had killed Carlo Alberto Dalla Chiesa in September 1982, who had been appointed as prefect for Palermo to stop the violence of the Second Mafia War just five months before.

The new provisions of article 416 bis of the law made it possible to prosecute not just single Mafia related crimes but the whole organisation as a criminal association and to go after the assets of the mafiosi. On 30 April 1982, La Torre and his driver Rosario Di Salvo were shot in a hail of bullets near the Communist Party's headquarters in Palermo; he had been "sentenced" to death by the Sicilian Mafia Commission because of his political endeavour against the Mafia.

In July 1983, magistrate Rocco Chinnici was the next victim in the war by the Mafia against state officials who dared to defy the organisation, and was killed by a car bomb at his home. His place as head of the 'Office of Instruction' (Ufficio istruzione), the investigative branch of the Prosecution Office of Palermo, was taken by Antonino Caponnetto, who formalized the pool. Next to Giovanni Falcone, the group included Paolo Borsellino, Giuseppe Di Lello and Leonardo Guarnotta. At the time the prosecution was separated in an examining phase (the so-called instruction phase) and a prosecuting phase.

The group pooled together several investigations into the Mafia, which resulted in the Maxi Trial against the Mafia, from February 1986 to December 1987. The proceedings took place in a purpose-built bunker courtroom, erected within the walls of Palermo's Ucciardone prison. A total of 475 mafiosi were indicted for a multitude of crimes relating to Mafia activities, based primarily on testimonies given as evidence from former Mafia bosses turned informants, known as pentiti, in particular Tommaso Buscetta and Salvatore Contorno. Most were convicted.

== Dissolution ==
When Caponnetto announced in January 1988 that he was retiring, nearly everyone in the Palermo judiciary, Caponnetto included, assumed that Falcone, the driving force behind the Antimafia Pool, would succeed him as head of the office (a post abolished only in 1989). The Superior Council of the Magistracy (CSM) decided otherwise. Adhering strictly to the principle that promotions be based on seniority, it chose a more senior magistrate, Antonino Meli, who had scant experience with Mafia cases.

As the new head of the examining judges, Meli distributed cases without treating Mafia matters as a special category. The practical result was the dismantling of the Antimafia Pool: its members were weighed down with investigations that had little to do with organized crime, while Mafia cases went to magistrates who lacked both the institutional memory and the will to pursue them.

To the surprise of many, however, the convictions of the Maxi Trial were upheld in January 1992, after the final stage of appeal. The importance of the trial was that the existence of the Cosa Nostra was finally judicially confirmed. In revenge, the Mafia – which at that time was controlled by Totò Riina's Corleonesi – started a terror campaign targeting the judges they held responsible for their conviction or politicians for not preventing the outcome of the trial such as Salvo Lima in the following months. Both Falcone and Borsellino, the two leading figures of the Antimafia Pool, were murdered respectively in the Capaci bombing on 23 May 1992 and the Via D'Amelio bombing on 19 July 1992.

== National Antimafia Directorate ==
Before Falcone was killed he had left the judiciary and moved to Rome, where a new Jusitice minister, Claudio Martelli, had offered him a position as Director of Penal Affairs. Building on the experience of the dissolved Antimafia Pool, he started to restructure the Italian prosecution system, creating District Antimafia Directorates (Direzione distrettuale antimafia, DDA) in each of the 26 major cities in Italy to fight the Mafia and a national office to fight organised crime, the National Antimafia Directorate (Direzione nazionale antimafia, DNA) as well as an national interagency anti-mafia police force, the Antimafia Investigative Directorate (Direzione Investigativa Antimafia, DIA).

What had been lost in 1988-90 when chief prosecutor Antonino Meli had dissolved the Antimafia pool and scattered its cases among the provincial offices of rural Sicily, Falcone rebuilt at the national level by enshrining the pool structure in law through Law Decree 367 of 20 November 1991 (converted into Law 8 of 20 January 1992). Its main role is to coordinate and drive Mafia investigations at both national and international levels, ensuring that knowledge and expertise are not lost or scattered when cases are handled by separate prosecution offices.

== See also ==
- Antimafia Commission

== Sources ==
- Jamieson, Alison (2000). The Antimafia: Italy's fight against organized crime, London: Macmillan, ISBN 0-333-80158-X.
- Schneider, Jane T. & Peter T. Schneider (2003). Reversible Destiny: Mafia, Antimafia, and the Struggle for Palermo, Berkeley: University of California Press ISBN 0-520-23609-2
- Stille, Alexander (1995). Excellent Cadavers: The Mafia and the Death of the First Italian Republic, New York: Vintage ISBN 0-09-959491-9
