= Paolo Borsellino =

Italian judge (1940–1992)

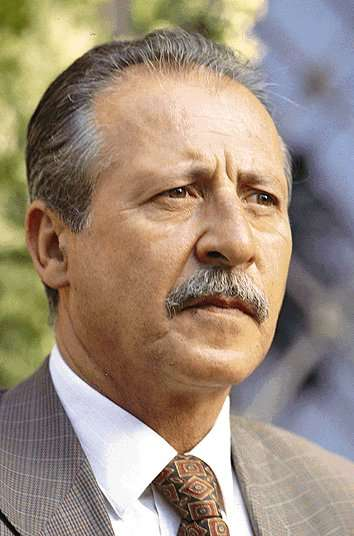
- Born: 19 January 1940; Palermo, Kingdom of Italy
- Died: 19 July 1992 (aged 52); Palermo, Italy
- Cause of death: Assassinated by the Sicilian Mafia
- Occupation: Magistrate
- Known for: Investigations into the Mafia
- Spouse: Agnese Piraino Leto
- Relatives: Rita Borsellino (sister)

Paolo Emanuele Borsellino (Italian pronunciation: [ˈpaːolo borselˈliːno]; 19 January 1940 – 19 July 1992) was an Italian judge and prosecuting magistrate. From his office in the Palace of Justice in Palermo, Sicily, he spent most of his professional life trying to overthrow the power of the Sicilian Mafia. After a long and distinguished career, culminating in the Maxi Trial in 1986–1987, on 19 July 1992, Borsellino was killed by a car bomb in Via D'Amelio, near his mother's house in Palermo.

Borsellino's life parallels that of his close friend Giovanni Falcone. They both spent their early years in the same neighbourhood in Palermo. Though many of their childhood friends grew up in the Mafia background, both men fought on the other side of the war against crime in Sicily as prosecuting magistrates. They were both killed in 1992, a few weeks apart. In recognition of their tireless effort and sacrifice during the anti-mafia trials, they were both awarded the Gold Medal for Civil Valor. They were also named as heroes of the last 60 years in the 13 November 2006 issue of Time magazine.

== Early life ==
Borsellino was born in a middle-class Palermo neighbourhood, Kalsa, a neighbourhood of central Palermo which suffered extensive destruction by aerial attacks during the Allied invasion of Sicily in 1943. His father was a pharmacist and his mother ran a pharmacy in the Via della Vetriera, next to the house where Paolo was born. As boys Borsellino and Giovanni Falcone – later a magistrate, who was born in the same neighbourhood – played football together on the Piazza Magione. The Mafia was present in the area but quiescent. Both had classmates who ended up as mafiosi. The house where he was born was declared unsafe and the family was forced to move out in 1956. The pharmacy remained, while the neighbourhood around it crumbled.

Borsellino and Falcone met again at Palermo University. While Borsellino tended towards the right and became a member of the Fronte Universitario d'Azione Nazionale (FUAN), a right-wing university organization affiliated with the neo-fascist Italian Social Movement, Falcone drifted away from his parents' middle-class conservative Catholicism towards communism. However, neither joined a political party, and although the ideologies of those political movements were diametrically opposed, they shared a history of opposing the Mafia. Their different political leanings did not thwart their friendship. Both decided to join the magistrature.

Borsellino obtained a degree in law at the University of Palermo, with honours, in 1962. After his father's death, he passed the judiciary exam in 1963. During those years, he worked in many cities in Sicily (Enna in 1965, Mazara del Vallo in 1967, Monreale in 1969). After he married in 1968, he transferred to his native Palermo in 1975 together with Rocco Chinnici, where he got involved in the investigation into Sicilian Mafia.

== First Mafia investigations ==
Neither Borsellino nor Falcone had intended to get involved in the struggle against the Mafia. They were assigned cases involving the Mafia that continued to expand and became disturbed by what they discovered. They saw colleagues murdered fighting the Mafia and it became increasingly impossible to turn back.

One of his accomplishments was the arrest of six Mafia members in 1980, including Leoluca Bagarella, the brother-in-law of Mafia boss Salvatore Riina. His close co-investigator, Carabiniere captain Emanuele Basile, was murdered by the Mafia the same year. Borsellino was assigned to investigate the murder and became a special target when he signed the arrest warrant for Francesco Madonia on a charge of ordering the murder of Basile. He was assigned police protection.

== Antimafia Pool ==
Giovanni Falcone and Paolo Borsellino. The picture of both assassinated judges became an iconic symbol of the struggle against Cosa Nostra. It is often used on posters and articles commemorating the fight against the Mafia.

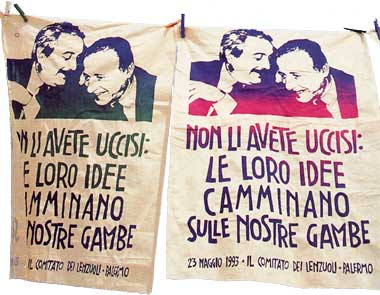
Sheets exposed in solidarity with Giovanni Falcone and Paolo Borsellino. They read: "You did not kill them: their ideas walk on our legs".

During those years, working together with magistrates Falcone and Chinnici, Borsellino continued his research about the Mafia and its links to political and economic powers in Sicily and Italy. He became part of Palermo's Antimafia Pool, created by Chinnici. The Antimafia pool was a group of investigating magistrates who closely worked together sharing information to diffuse responsibility and to prevent one person from becoming the sole institutional memory and solitary target. The group consisted of Falcone, Borsellino, Giuseppe Di Lello and Leonardo Guarnotta.

In 1983, Rocco Chinnici was killed by a bomb in his car. His place in the Antimafia Pool was taken by Antonino Caponnetto. The group pooled together several investigations into the Mafia, which would result in the Maxi Trial against the Mafia starting in February 1986 and which lasted until December 1987. A total of 475 mafiosi were indicted for a multitude of crimes relating to Mafia activities. Most were convicted and, to the surprise of many, the convictions were upheld several years later in January 1992, after the final stage of appeal. The importance of the trial was that the existence of Cosa Nostra was finally judicially confirmed.

In 1986, Borsellino became head of the Public Prosecution Office of Marsala, continuing his personal campaign against the Mafia bosses, in the most populated city of the province of Trapani. His links with Falcone, who remained in Palermo, allowed him to cover the entirety of Western Sicily for investigations. In 1987, after Caponnetto resigned due to illness, Borsellino was the protagonist of a great protest about the unsuccessful nomination of his friend Falcone as head of the Antimafia Pool.

== Last months ==
On the morning of May 19, 1992, during the course of the eleventh ballot of the 1992 Italian presidential election, the then-Secretary of the Movimento Sociale Italiano Gianfranco Fini gave Borsellino his endorsement for the office of President of Italy, and Borsellino received 47 votes from the electors in Parliament.

On 23 May 1992, Falcone, his wife and three police bodyguards were killed by a bomb planted under the highway outside of Palermo. Giovanni Brusca later claimed that 'boss of bosses' Salvatore Riina had told him that after the assassination of Falcone, there were indirect negotiations with the government. Former interior minister Nicola Mancino later said this was not true. In July 2012, Mancino was ordered to stand trial on charges of withholding evidence on 1992 talks between the Italian state and the Mafia and the killings of Falcone and Borsellino. Some prosecutors have theorized that Borsellino was killed because he had found out about the negotiations.

Borsellino failed to get himself appointed to the investigation into Falcone's murder. At a public meeting on 25 June 1992, he said that he had certain information which might explain why Falcone was killed. Borsellino unofficially asked Carabinieri Colonel Mario Mori to resume a previous investigation by Falcone into Mafia control of public works contracts. However, Mori, unbeknownst to Borsellino, was involved in secret meetings with Vito Ciancimino, who was close to Riina's lieutenant Bernardo Provenzano. Mori was later investigated on suspicion of posing a danger to the state after it was alleged he prevented the arrest of Provenzano and had taken a list of Riina's demands that Ciancimino had passed on. He maintained he had spoken to Ciancimino to further investigation of the Mafia, that Ciancimino had disclosed little beyond implicitly admitting he knew Mafia members, and that key meetings were after Borsellino's death. In 2014 Italy's president, Giorgio Napolitano, testified in a trial in which 10 defendants including the former interior minister, Nicola Mancino, were accused of negotiating with the Mafia.

On 17 July 1992, Borsellino went to Rome where he was told by Gaspare Mutolo, a Mafia member turned informer, of two allegedly corrupt officials: Bruno Contrada, former head of Palermo Flying Squad, now working for the secret service (SISDE), and anti-Mafia prosecutor Domenico Signorino. Borsellino considered Signorino a friend and was deeply troubled by the allegation. He was further disconcerted when the meeting was interrupted by a call from the Minister of the Interior, Nicola Mancino, requesting his immediate presence. Borsellino attended to discover that Contrada was there, and knew about the supposedly secret meeting with the informer.

== Death ==
On 19 July 1992, Borsellino was killed by a car bomb in Via D'Amelio, near his mother's house in Palermo, less than two months after the death of his friend Falcone in the Capaci bombing. The bomb attack also claimed the lives of five police officers: Agostino Catalano, Walter Cosina, Emanuela Loi (the first Italian policewoman to be killed in the line of duty), Vincenzo Li Muli and Claudio Traina. Officer Antonio Vullo, the driver, was the only survivor because he was in the armored car at the time of the explosion.

In his last video interview, given on 21 May 1992 to Jean Pierre Moscardo and Fabrizio Calvi, Borsellino spoke about the possible link between Cosa Nostra's mafiosi and rich Italian businessmen such as future Prime Minister Silvio Berlusconi. The interview received little coverage on Italian television; as of 2007, it has been broadcast only once, and that by a satellite channel RaiNews 24 in 2000, in an abridged version of 30 minutes rather than the original 50 minutes.

Dozens of mafiosi were sentenced to life imprisonment for their involvement in Borsellino's murder.

=== Legacy ===
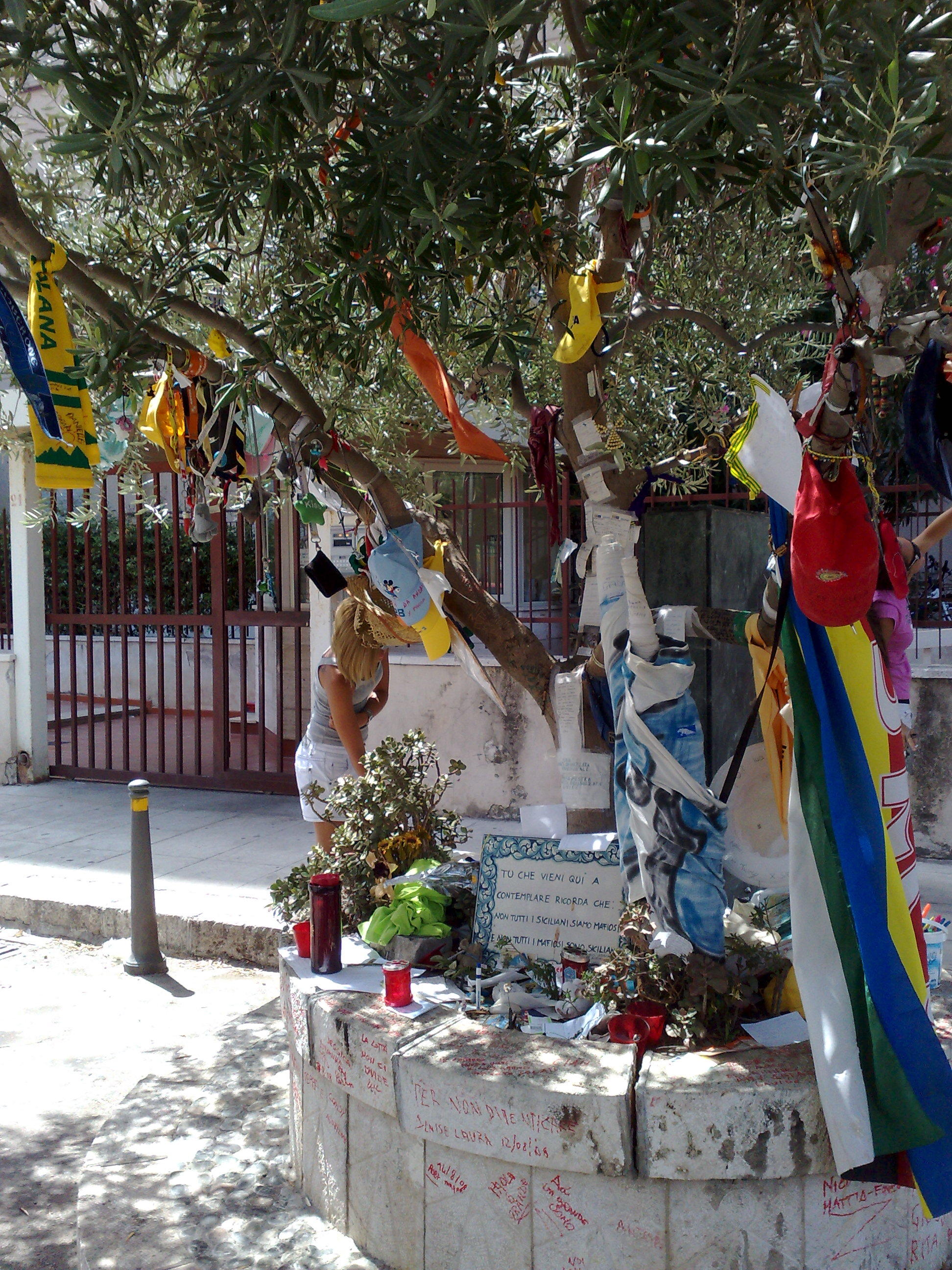
Memorial tree dedicated to Borsellino, in Palermo at the place where the car bomb was located

Borsellino today is considered as one of the most important magistrates killed by the Sicilian Mafia and he is remembered as one of the main symbols of the battle of the State against the Mafia. Many schools and public buildings were named after him, including Palermo International Airport (subsequently renamed Falcone-Borsellino Airport) – a memorial by local sculptor Tommaso Geraci is there – and the Velodromo Paolo Borsellino multi-use stadium in Palermo. In recognition of their efforts in the anti-Mafia trials, he and Giovanni Falcone were named as heroes of the last 60 years in the 13 November 2006 issue of Time.

His sister Rita ran as centre-left coalition (The Union) presidential candidate in the 2006 Sicilian regional election, after having won the regional primary election, but lost to incumbent Salvatore Cuffaro, who was later sentenced to seven years in prison for collusion with the Mafia.

His famous quote about Sicily, "she will become most beautiful", is the namesake of the Diventerà Bellissima party.

== In popular culture ==
- Giovanni Falcone (1993), directed by Giuseppe Ferrara, played by Giancarlo Giannini;
- Excellent Cadavers (1999), directed by Ricky Tognazzi, played by Andy Luotto;
- Gli angeli di Borsellino (2003), directed by Rocco Cesareo, played by Toni Garrani;
- Paolo Borsellino (2004), television miniseries by Gianluca Maria Tavarelli, played by Giorgio Tirabassi;
- Giovanni Falcone – L'uomo che sfidò Cosa Nostra (2006), Andrea and Antonio Frazzi's television miniseries, played by Emilio Solfrizzi;
- Paolo Borsellino – Essendo Stato (2006), theatrical performance written and directed by Ruggero Cappuccio;
- Il Capo dei Capi (2007), TV series by Enzo Monteleone and Alexis Sweet, played by Gaetano Aronica;
- Paolo Borsellino: una vita da eroe (2010), a video documentary by Lucio Miceli and Roberta Di Casimirro;
- Paolo Borsellino – I 57 giorni (2012), a television film by Alberto Negrin, played by Luca Zingaretti;
- Vi perdono ma inginocchiatevi (2012), a TV movie by Claudio Bonivento, played by Lollo Franco;
- The Mafia Kills Only in Summer (2013), directed by Pif;
- Era d'estate (2016), directed by Fiorella Infascelli, played by Giuseppe Fiorello;
- Paolo Borsellino. Adesso tocca a me (2017), a documentary fiction of Giovanni Filippetto, played by Cesare Bocci.

== See also ==
- Rita Atria
- Il Capo dei Capi
- List of victims of the Sicilian Mafia

== Bibliography ==
- Schneider, Jane T. & Peter T. Schneider (2003). Reversible Destiny: Mafia, Antimafia, and the Struggle for Palermo, Berkeley: University of California Press. ISBN 0-520-23609-2.
- Stille, Alexander (1995). Excellent Cadavers: The Mafia and the Death of the First Italian Republic, New York: Vintage. ISBN 0-09-959491-9.
- Follain, John (2012). Vendetta: The Mafia, Judge Falcone and the Quest for Justice, London: Hodder & Stoughton. ISBN 978-1-444-71411-1.
