= Rocco Chinnici =

Italian anti-Mafia magistrate

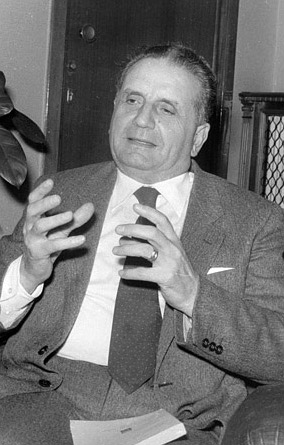
- Born: 19 January 1925; Misilmeri, Kingdom of Italy
- Died: 29 July 1983 (aged 58); Palermo, Italy
- Cause of death: Car bomb by the Sicilian Mafia
- Occupation: Magistrate
- Known for: Investigations into the Sicilian Mafia

Rocco Chinnici (Italian pronunciation: [ˈrɔkko kinˈniːtʃi], Sicilian: [cɪnˈniːʃɪ]; 19 January 1925 – 29 July 1983) was an Italian anti-Mafia magistrate killed by the Sicilian Mafia.

== Life ==
Born at Misilmeri, Chinnici graduated in law at the University of Palermo in 1947 and started working as a magistrate in 1952 in Trapani. In 1966 he moved to the prosecutor's office in Palermo. From that moment on, he began to handle sensitive Mafia trials, including, in 1970, the trial relating to the so-called Viale Lazio massacre. In November 1979, he became head of the Examining Office at the Palermo Court, following the murder of his predecessor, Cesare Terranova, by the Mafia. At the time the prosecution was separated in an examining phase (the so-called instruction phase) and a prosecuting phase.

Chinnici created the Antimafia Pool, a group of investigating magistrates who closely worked together sharing information to diffuse responsibility and to prevent one person from becoming the sole institutional memory and solitary target. The famous Antimafia magistrates Giovanni Falcone and Paolo Borsellino were part of the Antimafia Pool as well as Giuseppe Di Lello and Leonardo Guarnotta. The Antimafia pool laid the groundwork for the Maxi Trial against the Sicilian Mafia in 1986.

He was instrumental in reviving investigations into the Mafia and understood the need to bridge the gap between the judiciary and the rest of Sicilian society to create a counterculture against the Mafia and break down omertà, the law of silence that kept the Mafia alive. He frequently spoke out against the Mafia in public appearances and at schools at a time when judges avoided the word for many years.

== Death ==
On the morning of 29 July 1983, as Chinnici left his home for work in Palermo, a car bomb detonated and killed him, along with two of his bodyguards, Mario Trapassi and Salvatore Bartolotta, and the building's janitor, Stefano Li Sacchi. The explosion was set off by the notorious Mafia hitman Pino Greco, acting on instructions from his uncle, Michele Greco. This was the first time the Mafia used the plastic explosive Semtex, which had been supplied by the Lebanese arms and drugs dealer, Bou Ghebel Ghassan.

Shortly after the bombing, it emerged that police had received an informant's warning that a Palermo magistrate would be killed in a bomb attack, in retaliation for the arrest warrants for the killing in September 1982 of Carlo Alberto Dalla Chiesa, who had been appointed as prefect for Palermo to stop the violence of the Second Mafia War just five months before. Falcone and Chinnici had signed the warrants only two weeks earlier. Despite this warning, no additional protective measures were put in place for the two prosecutors. The tip had come from Bou Ghebel Ghassan, who supplied morphine base to Michele Greco's clan. Not long after Greco was named in the arrest warrants over the Dalla Chiesa murder, members of his clan revealed to Ghassan their plans to strike back.

In 2002, Bernardo Provenzano, Salvatore Riina, Raffaele Ganci, Antonino Madonia, Salvatore Buscemi, Nenè Geraci, Giuseppe Calò, Francesco Madonia, Salvatore and Giuseppe Montalto, Stefano Ganci and Vincenzo Galatolo were sentenced in absentia to life imprisonment for ordering the murder of Chinnici. He was succeeded as Chief Prosecutor by Antonino Caponnetto.

== Biography ==
- Zingales, Leone (2006). Rocco Chinnici, l'inventore del pool antimafia (in Italian). Edizioni Limina.

== See also ==
- Caterina Chinnici
- List of victims of the Sicilian Mafia
- Il Capo dei Capi
- Carlo Alberto Dalla Chiesa

== Sources ==
- Jamieson, Alison (2000). The Antimafia: Italy's fight against organized crime, London: Macmillan, ISBN 0-333-80158-X.
- Schneider, Jane T. & Peter T. Schneider (2003). Reversible Destiny: Mafia, Antimafia, and the Struggle for Palermo, Berkeley: University of California Press ISBN 0-520-23609-2
- Stille, Alexander (1995). Excellent Cadavers: The Mafia and the Death of the First Italian Republic, New York: Vintage ISBN 0-09-959491-9
