= List of crime bosses =

This is an incomplete list of crime bosses. This list is arranged alphabetically by last name, and broken into categories by year that an individual is believed to have assumed leadership of a criminal organization

== 19th century ==
- Shimizu Jirocho (1820-1893), natural causes
- James Dolan (1848–1898), natural causes
- Johnny Dolan (1849–1876), executed
- Monk Eastman (1875–1920), assassinated
- Paul Kelly (1876–1936), natural causes
- Vito Cascio Ferro (1862–1943)
- Giosue Gallucci (1864–1915), assassinated
- Huang Jinrong (1868–1953), natural causes
- John Morrissey (1831-1878), natural causes
- Jefferson R. "Soapy" Smith (1860–1898), assassinated
- Al Swearengen (1845–1904), natural causes

== Early 20th century (1900–1919) ==
- James "Big Jim" Colosimo (1878–1920), assassinated
- Salvatore "Toto" D'Aquila (1878–1928), assassinated
- Sebastiano DiGaetano (1862–?), disappeared in 1912
- Vito Di Giorgio (1880–1922), assassinated
- Du Yuesheng (1888–1951), natural causes
- Ignazio "the Wolf" Lupo (1877–1947), natural causes
- Owney "The Killer" Madden (1891–1965), natural causes
- Giuseppe Morello, (1867–1930), assassinated
- Nicholas Morello (1890–1916), assassinated
- Salvatore Sabella (1891–1962), natural causes
- Nicolo Schiro (1872–1957), natural causes
- Ciro Terranova (1889–1938), natural causes
- Calogero Vizzini (1877–1954), natural causes
- Harukichi Yamaguchi (1881–1938), natural causes

== Prohibition (1919–1933) ==
- Joe Adonis (1902–1971), natural causes
- Joe Aiello (1891–1930), assassinated
- Joseph Ardizzone (1884–1932), assassinated
- Joseph "Joe Bananas" Bonanno (1905–2002), natural causes
- Al "Scarface" Capone (1899–1947), natural causes
- Vincent "Mad Dog" Coll (1908–1932), assassinated
- Moe Dalitz (1899–1989), natural causes
- Rosario DeSimone (1873–1946), natural causes
- Jack "Legs" Diamond (1897–1931), assassinated
- Jack Dragna (1891–1956), natural causes
- Vincent "The Schemer" Drucci (1898–1927), assassinated
- Tommy Gagliano (1884–1951), natural causes
- Waxey Gordon (1886–1952), natural causes in prison
- Enoch L. Johnson (1883–1968), natural causes
- Meyer Lansky (1902–1983), natural causes
- John Lazia (1896–1934), assassinated
- Louis Lepke (1897–1944), executed
- Antonio "The Scourge" Lombardo (1892–1928), assassinated
- Charles "Lucky" Luciano (1897–1962), natural causes
- Stefano "The Undertaker" Magaddino (1891–1974), natural causes
- Vincent Mangano (1888–1951), assassinated
- Salvatore Maranzano (1886–1931), assassinated
- Giuseppe "Joe the Boss" Masseria (1887–1931), assassinated
- Gaspare Messina (1879–1957), natural causes
- George "Bugs" Moran (1891–1957), natural causes
- Alfred Mineo (1880–1930), assassinated
- Johnny Jack Nounes (1890–1970)
- Dean O'Banion (1892–1924), assassinated
- Raymond L.S. Patriarca (1908–1984), natural causes
- Joseph Pinzolo (1887–1930), assassinated
- Joe Profaci (1897–1962), natural causes
- Ollie Quinn (1893–1949)
- Gaetano Reina (1889–1930), assassinated
- George Remus (1874–1952), natural causes
- Paul "The Waiter" Ricca (1897–1972), natural causes
- Arnold Rothstein (1882–1928), assassinated
- Joseph "Polack Joe" Saltis (1894–1947), natural causes
- Dutch Schultz (1902–1935), assassinated
- Benjamin "Bugsy" Siegel (1906–1947), assassinated
- Stephanie "Queenie" St. Clair (1886–1969), natural causes
- Johnny Torrio (1882–1957), natural causes
- Dutch Voight (1888–1986), natural causes
- Earl "Hymie" Weiss (1898–1926), assassinated
- Frankie Yale (1893–1928), assassinated
- Frankie LaPorte (1901–1972)
- Noboru Yamaguchi (1902–1942), natural causes
- Abner "Longy" Zwillman (1899–1959), suicide

== Great Depression and World War II (1933–1945) ==
- Joseph "Joe the Barber" Barbara (1905–1959), natural causes
- Charles Binaggio (1909–1950), assassinated
- Alex "Shondor" Birns (1907–1975), assassinated
- Charles "Charlie the Wop" Carrollo (1902–1979), natural causes
- Frank Costello (1891–1973), natural causes
- Antonio Cottone (1904–1956), assassinated
- Salvatore Giuliano (1922–1950), killed by law enforcement.
- Ellsworth "Bumpy" Johnson (1905–1968), natural causes
- Yoshio Kodama (1911–1984), natural causes
- Sam "The Velvet Glove" Maceo (1894-1951), natural causes
- Rosario "Papa Rose" Maceo (1887-1954), natural causes
- Willie Moretti (1894–1951), assassinated
- Alfred "Big Al" Polizzi (1900–1975), natural causes
- Ross Prio (1901–1972), natural causes
- Giuseppe Genco Russo (1893–1976), natural causes
- John T. Scalish (1912–1976), natural causes
- John Sciandra (1899–1940), natural causes
- Santo Trafficante Sr. (1886–1954), natural causes

== Post-World War II (1945–1970) ==
- Tony "Big Tuna" Accardo (1906–1992), natural causes
- Felix "Milwaukee Phil" Alderisio (1912–1971), natural causes in prison
- Gus Alex (1916–1998), natural causes in prison
- Albert Anastasia (1902–1957), assassinated
- Gaetano Badalamenti (1923–2004), natural causes in prison
- "King" David Barksdale (1947–1974), natural causes
- Francesco Paolo Bontade (1914–1974), natural causes
- Angelo Bruno (1910–1980), assassinated
- Russell Bufalino (1903–1994), natural causes
- Giuseppe Calderone (1925–1978), assassinated
- Giuseppe Calò (born 1931), serving life sentence in prison
- Michele "The Cobra" Cavataio (1929–1969), assassinated
- Đại Cathay (1940-1967), cause of death disputed
- Jackie "The Lackey" Cerone (1914–1996), natural causes
- Chen "King Duck" Chi-li (1943–2007), natural causes
- Carl Civella (1910–1994), natural causes in prison
- Nicholas Civella (1912–1983), natural causes
- Joseph Civello (1902–1970), natural causes
- Mickey Cohen (1913–1976), natural causes
- Joe Colombo (1914–1978), natural causes
- Vincenzo Cotroni (1911–1984), natural causes
- Simone "Sam the Plumber" DeCavalcante (1912–1997), natural causes
- Frank DeSimone (1909–1967), natural causes
- Calcedonio Di Pisa (1931–1962), assassinated
- Gaspar DiGregorio (1905–1970), natural causes
- Thomas "Tommy Ryan" Eboli (1911–1972), assassinated
- Gaetano Fidanzati (1935–2013), natural causes in prison
- Jeff Fort (born 1947), serving life sentence in prison
- Marcel Francisci (1920–1982), assassinated
- "Crazy" Joe Gallo (1929–1972), assassinated
- Carlo Gambino (1902–1976), natural causes
- Sam "Momo" Giancana (1908–1975), assassinated
- Vito Genovese (1897–1969), natural causes in prison
- Antonio "Nenè" Geraci (1917–2007), natural causes
- Anthony "Fat Tony" Gizzo (1902–1953), natural causes
- Michele "The Pope" Greco (1924–2008), natural causes in prison
- Salvatore "The Engineer" Greco (born 1924), international fugitive since 1963.
- Salvatore "Little Bird" Greco (1923–1978), natural causes
- Danny Greene (1933–1977), assassinated
- Kakuji Inagawa (1914–2007), natural causes
- Dündar Kılıç (1935–1999), natural causes
- Ronnie and Reggie Kray (1933-1995 and 2000), natural causes
- Angelo La Barbera (1924–1975), assassinated
- Salvatore La Barbera (1922–1963), assassinated
- Luciano Leggio (1925–1993), natural causes in prison
- Nick Licata (1897–1974), natural causes
- Philip "Cockeyed Phil" Lombardo (1908–1987), natural causes
- Frank Lucas, retired from crime since 1991.
- Tommy Lucchese (1899–1967), natural causes
- Hisayuki Machii (1923–2002), natural causes
- Joseph Magliocco (1898–1963), natural causes
- Stefano Magaddino (1891–1974), natural causes
- Cesare Manzella (1897–1963), assassinated
- Carlos Marcello (1910–1993), natural causes
- Antonino Matranga (1905–1971), assassinated
- Eddie McGrath (born 1906, date of death unknown), cause of death unknown
- James "Buddy" McLean (1929–1965), assassinated
- Joe "Pegleg" Morgan (1929–1993), natural causes in prison
- Michele Navarra (1905–1958), assassinated
- John "Handsome Johnny" Roselli (1905–1976), assassinated
- Khun Sa (1933–2007), natural causes
- Antonio Salamone (1918–1998), natural causes
- Paul Sciacca (died 1970), natural causes
- Antonino Sorci (1904–1983), assassinated
- Mickey Spillane (1934–1977), assassinated
- Tokutaro Takayama (1928–2003), natural causes
- Masaru Takumi (1936–1997), assassinated
- Kazuo Taoka (1913–1981), natural causes
- Santo Trafficante, Jr. (1914–1987), natural causes
- Carmine "Mr. Gribbs" Tramunti (1910–1978), natural causes in prison
- Aslan "Grandpa Hassan" Usoyan (1937–2013), assassinated
- Howie Winter (1929–2020), retired as boss in 1978.
- Kenichi Yamamoto (1925–1982), natural causes

== Late 20th century (1970–2000) ==
- Pablo Acosta Villarreal (1937–1987), killed by law enforcement
- Mariano Agate (1939–2013), natural causes
- Pietro "The Little Gentleman" Aglieri (born 1959), serving life sentence in prison
- Evsei Agron (died 1985), assassinated
- Rafael Aguilar Guajardo (1950–1993), assassinated
- Vincenzo Aiello (born 1953), serving life sentence in prison
- Joseph "Joey Doves" Aiuppa (1907–1997), natural causes
- Yaakov Alperon (1955–2008), assassinated
- Victor "Little Vic" Amuso (born 1934), serving life sentence in prison
- Braulio Arellano Domínguez (d. 2009), killed by law enforcement
- Francisco Javier Arellano Félix (born 1969), serving twenty-three-year prison sentence
- Leoluca Bagarella (born 1942), serving life sentence in prison
- Marat Balagula (born 1943), at large
- Leroy "Nicky" Barnes (1933–2012), disease
- Jose Miguel Battle, Sr. (1930–2007), natural causes in prison
- Donovan "Bulbie" Bennett (1964–2005), killed by law enforcement
- Vivian Blake (1956–2010), natural causes
- Griselda Blanco (1943–2012), assassinated
- Stefano Bontade (1939–1981), assassinated
- Maurice Boucher (1953–2022), natural causes in prison
- Dominic Brooklier (1914–1984), natural causes in prison
- Klaus Bruinsma (1953–1991), assassinated
- Angelo Bruno (1910–1980), assassinated
- Giovanni "The Pig" Brusca (born 1957), serving life sentence in prison
- James "Whitey" Bulger (1929–2018), murdered in prison
- Martin "The General" Cahill (1949–1994), assassinated
- Năm Cam (1947–2004), executed
- William "Willie the Rat" Cammisano (1914–1995), natural causes
- Sebastiano Cannizzaro (born 1954), serving life sentence in prison
- Salvatore Cappello (born 1959), serving life sentence in prison
- Osiel Cárdenas Guillén (born 1967), serving twenty-five-year sentence
- Samuel "Sam Wings" Carlisi (1914–1997), natural causes in prison
- Amado Carrillo Fuentes (1956–1997), natural causes
- Vicente Carrillo Fuentes (born 1962), imprisoned
- Alfonso Caruana (born 1946), serving twenty-two-year prison sentence
- Anthony "Gaspipe" Casso (born 1942), serving life sentence in prison
- Paul Castellano (1915–1985), assassinated
- Peter Chong (born 1943), at large
- Renato Cinquegranella (born 1949), international fugitive since 2018
- Anthony "Tony Ripe" Civella (1930–1976), natural causes
- Christopher "Dudus" Coke (born 1969), serving twenty-three-year prison sentence
- Calogero Conti (1924–2020), natural causes
- Jimmy Coonan (born 1946), serving seventy-five-year prison sentence
- Anthony "Tony Ducks" Corallo (1913–2000), natural causes in prison
- John D'Amato (died 1992), assassinated
- William "Big Billy" D'Elia (born 1946), retired
- Boris Dekanidze (died 1995), executed.
- Giuseppe "The Tiger" Di Cristina (1923–1978), assassinated
- Thomas DiBella (1905-1988), natural causes
- John "No Nose" DiFronzo (1928–2018), natural causes
- Paolo Di Lauro (born 1953), imprisoned
- Dương Văn Khánh (1956-1998), executed
- Rayful Edmond (born 1964), currently enrolled in the Witness Protection Program
- Aldo Ercolano (born 1960), imprisoned
- Angelo Epaminonda (1945–2016), natural causes
- Pablo Escobar (1949–1993), killed by law enforcement.
- Natale "Joe Diamond" Evola (1907–1973), natural causes
- Giuseppe Falsone (born 1970), serving life sentence in prison
- Giuseppe Farinella (1925–2017), natural causes in prison
- Giuseppe Flachi (1951–2022), natural causes
- Miguel Ángel Félix Gallardo (born 1946), serving life sentence in prison
- Joseph Ferriola (1927–1989), natural causes
- Guy Fisher (born 1947), serving life sentence in prison
- Aladino "Jimmy the Weasel" Fratianno (1913–1993), natural causes
- Carmine "The Cigar" Galante (1910–1979), assassinated
- Eugenio Galea (born 1944), imprisoned
- Juan García Ábrego (born 1944), serving life sentence in prison
- Giuseppe Giacomo Gambino (1941–1996), suicide
- Raffaele Ganci (born 1932), serving life sentence in prison
- Mario Gigante (born 1923), at large
- Vincent "The Chin" Gigante (1928–2005), natural causes in prison
- "Factory" John Gilligan (born 1952), on trial
- Tadamasa Goto (born 1943), retired
- John Gotti (1940–2002), natural causes in prison
- Giuseppe Graviano (born 1963), serving life sentence in prison
- Joaquín "El Chapo" Guzmán (born 1957), serving life sentence in prison
- Dung Hà (1965-2000), assassinated
- Larry Hoover (born 1950), serving life sentence in prison
- Dawood Ibrahim (born 1955), international fugitive since 1993
- Georgi Iliev (1966–2005), assassinated
- Vasil Iliev (1964–1995), assassinated
- Salvatore Inzerillo (1944–1981), assassinated
- Tadashi Irie (born 1944), at large
- Vyacheslav "Yaponchik" Ivankov (1940–2009), assassinated
- Pappu Kalani (born 1951), serving life sentence in prison
- Zakhariy Kalashov (born 1953), at large
- Vladimir Kumarin (born 1956), serving fourteen-year prison sentence
- Otari Kvantrishvili (1948–1994), assassinated
- Francesco La Rocca (1938–2020), natural causes
- Carlos Lehder (born 1950), serving fifty-five-year prison sentence
- James T. "Blackie" Licavoli (1904–1985), natural causes in prison
- Salvatore "The Baron" Lo Piccolo (born 1942), serving life sentence in prison
- Joseph "Joey the Clown" Lombardo, (born 1929), serving life sentence in prison
- Salvatore Lo Russo (born 1953), arrested and became a pentito
- Giuseppe Lucchese (born 1959), serving life sentence in prison
- Francesco Madonia (1924–2007), natural causes in prison
- Francesco Mallardo (1951–2025), natural causes in prison
- Andrea Manciaracina (born 1962), serving life sentence in prison
- Francesco Mangion (1936–2002), natural causes
- Luigi "Baby Shacks" Manocchio (born 1929), at large
- Howard Marks (1945–2016), natural causes
- Joseph "Big Joey" Massino (born 1943), first boss of one of the Five Families in New York City to turn state's evidence
- Francesco Matrone (born 1947), serving two life sentences in prison
- Kenneth "Supreme" McGriff (born 1959), serving life sentence in prison
- Joseph "Skinny Joey" Merlino (born 1962), serving two-year prison sentence
- Gerlandino Messina (born 1972), serving nine-year prison sentence
- Sergei Mikhailov (born 1958), at large
- Peter "Shakes" Milano (1925–2012), natural causes
- Felix "The Cat" Mitchell (1954–1986), assassinated
- Semion Mogilevich (born 1946), international fugitive since 2003
- Diego León Montoya Sánchez (born 1958), serving forty-five-year prison sentence
- Rocco Morabito (born 1966), international fugitive since 2019
- Giovanni Motisi (born 1959), international fugitive since 1998
- Boris Nayfeld (born c.1947), retired
- Khozh-Ahmed Noukhayev (born 1954), missing and presumed dead
- Tariel Oniani (born 1952), serving ten-year prison sentence
- Héctor Luis Palma Salazar (born 1940), awaiting trial
- Antonio Papalia (born 1954), serving life sentence in prison
- Domenico Papalia (born 1945), serving life sentence in prison
- Johnny Papalia (1924–1997), assassinated
- Savino Parisi (1960), serving twenty-seven-year prison sentence
- Raymond Patriarca Jr. (born 1945), retired
- Carmine "Junior" Persico (1933–2019), natural causes in prison
- Santiago Luis Polanco Rodríguez (born 1961), retired
- Mario Prestifilippo (1958–1987), assassinated
- Bernardo "Bennie the Tractor" Provenzano (1933–2016), natural causes in prison
- Giuseppe "o Giappone" Puca (1955-1989), assassinated
- Vincenzo Puccio (1945–1989), assassinated
- Domenico Raccuglia (born 1964), serving life sentence in prison
- Bosko "The Yugo" Radonjich (born 1943-2011), natural causes
- Philip "Rusty" Rastelli (1918–1991), natural causes
- Željko "Arkan" Ražnatović (1952–2000), assassinated
- Rosario Riccobono (1929–1982), assassinated
- Salvatore "Totò" Riina (1930-2017), natural causes in prison
- Nicolo Rizzuto (1924–2010), assassinated
- Vito Rizzuto (1946–2013), natural causes
- José Gonzalo Rodríguez Gacha (1947–1989), killed by law enforcement
- Gilberto Rodríguez Orejuela (born 1939), serving thirty-year prison sentence
- Miguel Rodríguez Orejuela (born 1943), serving thirty-year prison sentence
- Pasquale Russo (born 1947), serving life sentence in prison
- Salvatore Russo (born 1958), serving life sentence in prison
- "Cadillac" Frank Salemme (born 1933), serving life sentence in prison
- Anthony "Fat Tony" Salerno (1911–1992), natural causes in prison
- José Santacruz Londoño (1943–1996), killed by law enforcement
- Benedetto "The Hunter" Santapaola (born 1938), serving life sentence in prison
- Nicodemo "Little Nicky" Scarfo (1929–2017), natural causes in prison
- Benedetto Spera (born 1934), serving life sentence in prison
- Anthony "Tony the Ant" Spilotro (1938–1986), assassinated
- John Stanfa (born 1940), serving life sentence in prison
- Nikolay Suleimanov (1955–1994), assassinated
- Omid Tahvili (born 1970), international fugitive since 2007
- Masahisa Takenaka (1933–1985), assassinated
- Philip "Chicken Man" Testa (1924–1981), assassinated
- David Thai (born 1956), serving life sentence in prison
- Frank "Funzi" Tieri (1904–1981), natural causes
- Joseph "Lead Pipe Joe" Todaro (1923–2012), natural causes
- Alimzhan Tokhtakhunov (born 1949), international fugitive since 2002
- Robert Trimbole (1931–1987), natural causes
- Franco Coco Trovato (born 1947), serving life sentence in prison
- John "Peanuts" Tronolone (1910–1991), natural causes
- Mery Valencia (born 1953), at large
- Koose Muniswamy Veerappan (1952–2004), killed by law enforcement
- Vincenzo Virga (born 1936), serving life sentence in prison
- Giuseppa "Giusy" Vitale (born 1972), currently enrolled in the Italian Witness Protection Program
- Vito Vitale (born 1958), at large
- Yoshinori Watanabe (1941–2012), natural causes

== Early 21st century (2000–) ==
- Raffaele Amato (born 1965), imprisoned
- Vincent "Vinny Gorgeous" Basciano (born 1959), serving life sentence in prison
- Liborio "Barney" Bellomo (born 1957)
- Frank Cali (1965–2019), assassinated
- Domenico Cefalù (born 1947)
- Cosimo Di Lauro (1973–2022), natural causes in prison
- Marco Di Lauro (born 1980), serving life sentence in prison
- Francesco Domingo (born 1956), currently awaiting sentencing
- Servando "The Teacher" Gómez Martínez (born 1966), imprisoned
- Peter "One-Eyed Pete" Gotti (1939–2021) natural causes while in prison
- Mohamed Abdi "Big Mouth" Hassan, serving twenty-year prison sentence
- Abdul-Malik al-Houthi (born 1979)
- Hussein al-Houthi (1959–2004), killed by military
- Rovshan Janiyev (1975–2016), assassinated
- Paul Le Roux (born 1972), imprisoned
- Joseph "Uncle Joe" Ligambi (born 1939), retired
- Michael "The Nose" Mancuso (born 1955)
- James "Little Jimmy" Marcello (born 1943), serving life sentence in prison
- Matteo Messina Denaro (1962–2023), natural causes in prison
- Settimo Mineo (born 1938), imprisoned
- Nazario "The Rosary" Moreno González (1970–2014), killed by law enforcement
- Gianni Nicchi (born 1981), serving eighteen-year prison sentence
- Cesare Pagano (born 1969), imprisoned
- Antonio Rotolo (born 1946), serving thirteen-year prison sentence
- Vincenzo Santapaola (born 1969), imprisoned
- Kenichi Shinoda (born 1942), at large
- Dušan Spasojević (1968–2003), assassinated
- Kiyoshi Takayama (born 1947), serving six-year prison sentence
- Ross Ulbricht (born 1984), sentenced to life but pardoned by President Donald Trump in 2025

== See also ==
- List of criminal enterprises, gangs and syndicates
- List of Italian-American mobsters
- List of fictional crime bosses
