= Domenico Raccuglia =

Member of the Sicilian Mafia

Domenico Mimmo Raccuglia, Mafia boss of Altofonte.

Domenico "Mimmo" Raccuglia (Italian pronunciation: [doˈmeːniko rakˈkuʎʎa]; born 27 October 1964, in Altofonte), nicknamed 'u vitirinariu ("the veterinarian") is a member of the Mafia in Sicily. He was a fugitive and included on Italy's most wanted list since 1996, until his capture on 15 November 2009, near Trapani.

== Biography ==
=== Mafia career ===
Raccuglia is the current boss of Altofonte Mafia family, the mandamento of San Giuseppe Jato-Partinico, and is considered to be the heir of Giovanni Brusca. After the arrest of the Mafia's boss of bosses, Bernardo Provenzano, his name was mentioned as one of the possible successors together with Matteo Messina Denaro and Salvatore Lo Piccolo.

Raccuglia received a life sentence for the murder of Girolamo La Barbera, the father of pentito Gioacchino La Barbera who was one of the key witnesses in the trial on the murder of Giovanni Falcone, in June 1994. (Giovanni Brusca received 13 years for ordering the killing). In 2004 he received another life sentence for a series of murders in the 1990s.

The third life sentence, he received for his involvement with the kidnap and killing of the 11-year-old Giuseppe Di Matteo – the son of the pentito (a mafioso turned state witness) Santino Di Matteo. The boy had been kidnapped on the orders of Giovanni Brusca in November 1993 to force Di Matteo to retract his testimony. The boy was killed in January 1996 after 779 days in captivity – his body was dissolved in a barrel of acid to destroy the evidence.

=== Power dispute in Partinico ===
According to the pentita Giusy Vitale, sister of mafioso Vito Vitale of Partinico, in 1998 some “young Turks’’ within Cosa Nostra wanted to set aside Bernardo Provenzano. Next to Vitale they were Giovanni Brusca, Mimmo Raccuglia and Matteo Messina Denaro. The younger bosses wanted to take strategic decisions without the prior consent of Provenzano.

The mandamento of Partinico is disputed between the Vitale clan and the Lo Iacono clan. Raccuglia supports the Vitale family – historical allies of Totò Riina – while Provenzano backed the other side until his arrest in April 2006. In October 2005, Vitale's rival Maurizio Lo Iacono was shot in Partinico in his car by two men on a scooter with a sawn-off shotgun and a .38 pistol. Police speculate that the murder had been ordered by Mimmo Raccuglia.

=== Leading Mafia boss ===
After the arrest of older generation bosses of Cosa Nostra – such as Provenzano, Lo Piccolo and Antonio Rotolo – in 2006 and 2007, Raccuglia's chances of becoming one of the possible leading Mafia bosses improved. However, according to the assistant prosecutor Francesco Del Bene, Raccuglia lacks the armed forces and economic power to really rise to the position of a leading boss of Cosa Nostra.

According to Antonio Ingroia, one of the prosecutors of the Direzione Distrettuale Antimafia (DDA) of Palermo, the main leading figures in Cosa Nostra at the moment, Matteo Messina Denaro, Giovanni Riina, Raccuglia, Pietro Tagliavia and Gianni Nicchi, are still too young to be recognized as leading bosses of the organisation.

Raccuglia was thought to hide in the area under his command, where he oversees his affairs and the ongoing dispute over Partinico. In April 2009, police raided a Byzantine monastery in Piana degli Albanesi in an effort to arrest Raccuglia, but he was nowhere to be found.

He was arrested on 15 November 2009, in Calatafimi in the Province of Trapani, in Sicily, after 15 years of being a fugitive. Onlookers applauded as he was paraded onto the street in Palermo by balaclava-clad police whose colleagues celebrated their accomplishment by cheering from an upstairs window.
