= Matteo Messina Denaro =

Italian mafia boss (1962–2023)

- Composite sketch of Matteo Messina Denaro
- Born: 26 April 1962; Castelvetrano, Sicily, Italy
- Died: 25 September 2023 (aged 61); L'Aquila, Abruzzo, Italy
- Other names: Diabolik; U Siccu ("The Skinny")
- Occupation: Mafia boss
- Children: 1
- Status: Deceased (imprisoned from 2023)
- Allegiance: Castelvetrano Mafia family / Cosa Nostra
- Convictions: Mafia association Multiple murders
- Criminal charges: Mafia association Multiple murders
- Penalty: Seven terms of life imprisonment

Matteo Messina Denaro (Italian pronunciation: [matˈtɛːo mesˈsiːna deˈnaːro]; 26 April 1962 – 25 September 2023), also known as Diabolik (from the Italian comic book character), was an Italian mafia boss from Castelvetrano. He was considered to be one of the new leaders of the Cosa Nostra after the arrests of Bernardo Provenzano on 11 April 2006 and Salvatore Lo Piccolo in November 2007. The son of a Mafia boss, Denaro became known nationally on 12 April 2001 when the magazine L'Espresso put him on the cover with the headline: Ecco il nuovo capo della Mafia ("Here is the new Mafia boss").

Messina Denaro became a fugitive on the most wanted list of the Italian Ministry of the Interior in 1993; according to Forbes in 2010, he was one of the ten most wanted and powerful criminals in the world. With the deaths of Bernardo Provenzano in 2016 and Salvatore Riina in 2017, Messina Denaro was seen as the unchallenged boss of all bosses within the Mafia. After 30 years on the run, he was arrested on 16 January 2023 near a private clinic in Sicily's capital, Palermo, where he was reportedly undergoing chemotherapy under a false name. Messina Denaro died in a prison hospital on 25 September 2023 after falling into an irreversible coma at the age of 61, after receiving treatment for colon cancer.

== Early life ==
Matteo Messina Denaro was born in Castelvetrano in the province of Trapani, Sicily. His father, Francesco Messina Denaro, known as Don Ciccio, was the capo mandamento of Castelvetrano. Matteo learned to use a gun at 14. He once bragged: "I filled a cemetery all by myself." He made a reputation by murdering rival boss Vincenzo Milazzo from Alcamo and strangling Milazzo's three-month-pregnant girlfriend.

His father started as a campiere (armed guard) of the D'Alì family, wealthy landowners who were among the founders of the Banca Sicula. He became the fattore (overseer of an estate) of the D'Alì land holdings. They handed over a significant estate in the area of Zangara (Castelvetrano) to Matteo Messina Denaro. However, the real new owner turned out to be Salvatore Riina, leader of the Corleonesi Mafia clan, with whom Messina Denaro was allied.

Messina Denaro is often portrayed as a ruthless playboy mafioso and womaniser, driving an expensive Porsche sports car and wearing a Rolex Daytona watch, Ray Ban sunglasses and fancy clothes from Giorgio Armani and Versace. He was an ardent player of computer games, and is said to be the father of an extramarital child. Messina Denaro had a reputation for fast living and allegedly killed a Sicilian hotel owner who accused him of taking young girls to bed. As such, he was remarkably different from traditional Mafia bosses like Salvatore Riina and Bernardo Provenzano who claimed to adhere to conservative family values.

After the natural death of his father in November 1998, Matteo became capo mandamento of the area including Castelvetrano and the neighbouring cities, while Vincenzo Virga ruled in the city of Trapani and its surroundings. After the arrest of Virga in 2001, Messina Denaro took over the leadership of the Mafia in the province of Trapani. He was said to reorganise the 20 Mafia families in Trapani into one single mandamento separated from the rest of Cosa Nostra. The Trapani Mafia is considered the zoccolo duro (solid pedestal) of Cosa Nostra and the most powerful except for the families in Palermo.

According to the Direzione distrettuale antimafia (DDA) of Palermo, he had interests in Venezuela and contacts with Colombian drug trafficking cartels as well as the 'Ndrangheta. His illicit networks extend to Belgium and Germany.

Messina Denaro had strong links with Mafia families in Palermo, in particular in Brancaccio, the territory of the Graviano Family. Filippo Guttadauro, the brother of Giuseppe Guttadauro – the regent of the Brancaccio Mafia while Giuseppe Graviano and Filippo Graviano are in jail – is the brother-in-law of Messina Denaro. They are involved in cocaine trafficking in agreement with 'Ndrangheta clans from Platì, Marina di Gioiosa Ionica and Siderno, as well as the Mafia family of Mariano Agate.

== Fugitive after 1992/93 bombings ==
Photofit of Messina Denaro after working on a 20-year-old photo from his driving licence (April 2007). According to a Palermo police spokesman, "Officers from the scientific unit have spent several months working on it and have used sophisticated techniques to build up the image. Denaro is an arrogant man, and that's why he has a slight smile in the photo fit, and we know he has a liking for designer clothes, which is why he has an open-neck silk shirt."

After bomb attacks in Capaci and Via D'Amelio that killed prosecutors Giovanni Falcone and Paolo Borsellino, the arrest of Salvatore Riina on 15 January 1993 and the introduction of strict prison regime (article 41-bis), Cosa Nostra embarked on a terrorist campaign in which Messina Denaro played a prominent role.

The remaining Mafia bosses, among them Messina Denaro, Giovanni Brusca, Leoluca Bagarella, Antonino Gioè, Giuseppe Graviano and Gioacchino La Barbera, met several times (often in the Santa Flavia area in Bagheria on an estate owned by the mafioso Leonardo Greco). They decided on a strategy to force the Italian state to retreat. That resulted in a series of bomb attacks in the Via dei Georgofili in Florence, in Via Palestro in Milan, in the Piazza San Giovanni in Laterano and Via San Teodoro in Rome, which left 10 people dead and 93 injured as well as damage to centres of cultural heritage such as the Uffizi Gallery.

Messina Denaro also tailed the TV journalist Maurizio Costanzo, host of the Maurizio Costanzo Show, who had just escaped a car bomb attack on 14 May 1993. He also observed the movements of Falcone and the Minister of Justice, Claudio Martelli, in 1991. After the 1993 bombings, Messina Denaro went into hiding as of June 1993.

According to investigators, between 1994 and 1996 Messina Denaro spent time in his hiding place located between Aspra and Bagheria with his lover Maria Mesi, with whom he went on vacation to Greece under the false name of "Matteo Cracolici".

In 1995, Messina Denaro, who by then had a daughter from a previous relationship with Francesca Alagna, went to live with his mother. In a letter addressed to a friend, seized by investigators, Messina Denaro revealed that he had never met this daughter.

In 1999, Messina Denaro received his first life sentence, in absentia for the murder of Giuseppe Montalto, a prison guard at the Ucciardone prison in Palermo, killed in 1995.

In 2000, Messina Denaro received a life sentence in absentia for the 1993 bomb attacks in Florence, Milan and Rome, and another life sentence later that year.

In 2000, Maria Mesi was arrested, and because police found love letters that she had exchanged with Messina Denaro, the following year she was sentenced to three years in prison for aiding and abetting together with her brother Francesco. In July 2006, investigators found other love letters from Maria Mesi at the home of Filippo Guttadauro, who had the task of delivering them to his brother-in-law Messina Denaro.

In 2003, Messina Denaro was given another life sentence in absentia, accused of hundreds of murders which occurred in the early 1990s during the Alcamo mafia feud fought between the Corleonesi and the Stiddaro clan of the Greco Mafia clan.

=== Possible successor of Provenzano ===
According to Giusy Vitale, a pentita, in 1998, Messina Denaro was one of the young Turks within Cosa Nostra who wanted to set aside Bernardo Provenzano. In addition to Messina Denaro, they were Giovanni Brusca, Domenico Raccuglia, and Vito Vitale. The younger bosses wanted to make strategic decisions without the prior consent of Provenzano. They told him to "go home and take care of your family".

After the arrest of Provenzano on 11 April 2006, Messina Denaro was often mentioned as his successor. His main rivals were supposed to be Salvatore Lo Piccolo, boss of the mandamento of San Lorenzo, Palermo, and Domenico Raccuglia from Altofonte. Provenzano allegedly nominated Messina Denaro in one of his pizzini, which are small slips of paper used to communicate with other mafiosi to avoid phone conversations. Messina Denaro used the pseudonym "Alessio" in his clandestine correspondence with former Mafia boss Provenzano. He suffered from severe myopia and received treatment for this condition at a clinic in Barcelona, Spain, in 1994 and 1996.

This presupposed that Provenzano had the power to nominate a successor, which was not unanimously accepted among Mafia observers. According to anti-Mafia prosecutor Antonio Ingroia of the Direzione distrettuale antimafia (DDA) of Palermo, "The Mafia today is more of a federation and less of an authoritarian state", referring to the previous period of authoritarian rule under Salvatore Riina. Ingroia says that Provenzano "established a kind of directorate of about four to seven men who met very infrequently, only when necessary, when there were strategic decisions to make".

According to Ingroia, "in an organization like the Mafia, a boss has to be one step above the others, otherwise, it all falls apart. It all depends on whether he can manage consensus and whether the others agree or rebel." For Ingroia, Provenzano "guaranteed a measure of stability because he had the authority to quash internal disputes". According to Sergio Lari, deputy chief prosecutor of Palermo, "Either the directorate can choose a successor or we could again be in for a fiery time". Ingroia said that it was unlikely that there would be an all-out war over who would fill Provenzano's shoes. He said: "Right now I don't think that's probable." Of the two possible successors, Ingroia thought Lo Piccolo was the more likely heir to the Mafia throne, saying: "He's from Palermo and that's still the most powerful Mafia stronghold."

=== After the arrest of Lo Piccolo ===
After the arrest of Salvatore Lo Piccolo in November 2007, Messina Denaro was generally viewed as one of the possible leading Mafia bosses. According to Antonio Ingroia, one of the prosecutors of the Direzione distrettuale antimafia (DDA) of Palermo, the main leading figures in Cosa Nostra at that point, Messina Denaro, Giovanni Riina, Domenico Raccuglia, Pietro Tagliavia and Gianni Nicchi, were still too young to be recognized as leading bosses of the organisation. The police believed that Messina Denaro was hiding out close to his family home at Castelvetrano and moved between safe houses. On 15 November 2009, Domenico Raccuglia was arrested in a small town near Trapani, having been convicted in absentia for murder and other crimes.

On 18 November 2008, Italian authorities seized €700 million in assets from the supermarket king of Sicily, Giuseppe Grigoli, traceable to Messina Denaro. The assets included 12 businesses, 220 real estate holdings – including villas and apartment blocks – and 133 land holdings, for a total of 60 hectares. Grigoli was arrested in December 2007 after authorities found documents linking him to Messina Denaro in the hideout where Provenzano was arrested in April 2006. Grigoli has the exclusive franchise for western Sicily of the SPAR supermarket chain.

"This is one of the most important operations in recent years", said Palermo prosecutor Roberto Scarpinato. Investigators believed that through his supermarkets, Grigoli was able to launder illicit profits for Cosa Nostra and give legal cover to mafiosi. "Having conquered the food distribution market, Grigoli was able to give jobs to hundreds of people close to Cosa Nostra or recommended by the Mafia", Scarpinato said. He added that from evidence discovered on tiny paper-scrap messages found in the hut where Provenzano was arrested, Messina Denaro "knew to the last comma the accounts of Grigoli's supermarkets".

=== More assets seized ===
In January 2010, police seized construction companies, villas, shops, and vehicles worth some €550 million from a western Sicilian construction magnate, Rosario Cascio, believed to be one of the main bankrollers and money launderers for Messina Denaro. Together with €700 million in assets taken from supermarket magnate Giuseppe Grigoli at the end of 2008 and €200 million from construction tycoon Francesco Pecora in November 2009. In total, €1.4 billion were seized, which was seen as a clear reminder of the deep-rooted economic power of Messina Denaro.

In September 2010, police seized a record amount of assets, worth €1.5 billion, from Sicilian businessman Vito Nicastri, accused of working with Messina Denaro. He had invested in wind and solar energy sources as a way of laundering money. The Italian police applied a new strategy to try to capture Messina Denaro, arresting scores of his underlings and seizing millions of euros in assets. "The circle is closing around the No.1 fugitive", Interior Minister Roberto Maroni said. Palermo Chief Prosecutor Francesco Messineo added that the aim of the strategy against Messina Denaro was to "dry up the water he swims in".

With the arrest of Gerlandino Messina, the alleged boss of Agrigento, on 23 October 2010 in Favara, Agrigento province, the circle around Messina Denaro tightened even more, as notes addressed specifically to Messina Denaro to discuss territorial division were thought likely to provide clues to his whereabouts and recent activities.

=== Arrest attempts and later events ===
On 15 March 2010, Messina Denaro's brother, Salvatore Messina Denaro, was arrested along with 18 others in operation "Golem 2". They were part of a network surrounding the Mafia boss and were charged with organizing Messina Denaro's secret correspondence in order to help him remain hidden. Other charges include mafia association, corruption and protection rackets.

On 19 May 2011, an attempt to arrest Messina Denaro failed. Police surrounded a manor farm ten minutes from his hometown, Castelvetrano. They were tipped by the secret service Agenzia Informazioni e Sicurezza Interna which had provided useful information for the previous arrests of Mafia bosses Giuseppe Falsone and Gerlandino Messina. However, there was no trace of Messina Denaro.

In 2012, though still at large, Messina Denaro was one of five people sentenced to life imprisonment for their roles in the murder of Giuseppe Di Matteo.

On 13 December 2013, Messina Denaro's sister, Patrizia Messina Denaro, was arrested along with several other mafia associates in a serious blow to Messina Denaro by Italian police. On 17 April 2018, she was sentenced to 14 years in prison for mafia association, external competition, and attempted extortion.

In December 2014, there was a mention of Italian police coming close to apprehending Messina Denaro after they made an estimated €20 million seizure of his assets in the form of valuable olive groves in Trapani. Wiretaps had revealed Messina Denaro was receiving funding from the Fountain of Gold olive oil business based in the region.

In December 2017, over 200 Italian police officers executed search warrants at properties owned by around 30 Italian mafiosi in and near Castelvetrano, his hometown, in the search for Messina Denaro.

In November 2018, Italian businessman Carmelo Patti, accused of working with Messina Denaro, had €1.5 billion of his assets seized by Italian police on the basis that they related to the proceeds of crime.

On 20 October 2020, Messina Denaro was sentenced in absentia to life imprisonment by the Corte d'Assise for having been one of the instigators of the Capaci bombing and Via D'Amelio bombing. After his capture in January 2023, the sentence was confirmed on 18 July 2023.

On 12 August 2021, TG1 released the first-ever voice recording of Messina Denaro. The recording originated from an archived cassette tape of the Court of Marsala until it was recovered by local Anti-Mafia associations and news outlets. The recording dated from 18 March 1993, taking place in the court of Marsala regarding a murder case in Partanna. Messina Denaro testified in the case and, almost three months later, was deemed a fugitive.

On 10 September 2021, there was a Dutch news report that Messina Denaro might have been arrested two days earlier while in a restaurant in The Hague, after receiving a tip from Italian authorities. However, Dutch prosecutors confirmed later that it was not Denaro but instead a man from Liverpool. Following this incident, severe criticism was directed toward Italian authorities.

On 30 September 2021, TG2 revealed the first known video of Messina Denaro. The sighting came from a security camera in the area of the Valle del Belice in December 2009. The footage shows a Mitsubishi Pajero driving through the valley, revealing at least two occupants. The front passenger is supposedly Messina Denaro. In October 2021, Italian authorities launched a manhunt across Sicily.

== Capture and death ==
On 16 January 2023, Messina Denaro was arrested in Sicily by Italian police, after being a fugitive since 1993. His arrest came almost exactly 30 years after that of Riina, who was taken into custody on 15 January 1993, also in Palermo.

Over 100 members of the armed forces were involved in the arrest of Messina Denaro, who was detained in Palermo at a private clinic where he was receiving treatment for colon cancer (reportedly visiting the clinic under a fake name for chemotherapy). Italian media reported that Messina Denaro was captured just before 10:00 (CET) and taken to a secret location by the Carabinieri. At the time of his arrest, Messina Denaro's assets were estimated to be at least €4 billion.

During the night, he was transferred by a secret military flight to the prison of L'Aquila under the article 41-bis prison regime. The prison has an oncology ward and is the nearest place to Rome where he was to be questioned by the Italian magistrates.

On 24 September 2023, Messina Denaro fell into an irreversible coma, and died in the early morning on 25 September 2023 at age 61.

== Writings ==
- Matteo Messina Denaro; Salvatore Mugno (2008). Lettere a Svetonio. Eretica (in Italian). Viterbo: Stampa alternativa/ Nuovi equilibri. p. 126. ISBN 978-8862220538. OCLC 314111721. – via = archive.is.
- Marco Bova (2021). Matteo Messina Denaro, latitante di Stato. Inchieste (in Italian). Roma: Ponte alle Grazie. p. 336. ISBN 8833318427. – via amazon.com.

== See also ==
- List of fugitives from justice who disappeared
