= Giovanni Motisi =

Member of the Sicilian Mafia

- Born: 1 January 1959 (age 67); Palermo, Sicily, Italy
- Other name: U Pacchiuni
- Occupation: Crime boss
- Predecessor: Matteo Motisi
- Spouse: Caterina Pecora
- Status: Fugitive
- Allegiance: Motisi Mafia clan / Cosa Nostra
- Criminal charges: Murder, mafia association

Giovanni Motisi (Italian pronunciation: [dʒoˈvanni moˈtiːzi], Sicilian: [mʊˈtiːsɪ]; born 1 January 1959, in Palermo) also known as 'U Pacchiuni (Sicilian for 'The Fatman'), is a member of the Sicilian Mafia in Sicily from the Altarello neighbourhood in Palermo. He has been on the most wanted list of the Italian Ministry of the Interior since 1998.

== Criminal background ==
He succeeded his uncle Matteo Motisi as head of the Motisi Mafia clan and boss of the mandamento of Pagliarelli, becoming one of the most powerful bosses of Palermo. He rose through the ranks as one of the killers for Totò Riina and his Corleonesi, but became close to Bernardo Provenzano when the latter took over the position of Riina as head of Cosa Nostra.

Motisi has been fugitive since 1998, on the list of most wanted fugitives in Italy, for murder and mafia association. Since 10 December 1999, he has also been wanted internationally.

He received a life sentence for the murder of the police officer Beppe Montana, killed on 28 July 1985. In March 2001, he escaped an attempt to arrest him. In 2002 he was replaced as the capo mandamento of the Pagliarelli neighbourhood by Antonio Rotolo when the latter left prison, because as a fugitive he did not manage the Mafia family sufficiently.

After the arrest of an older generation Mafia bosses – such as Bernardo Provenzano, Antonio Rotolo and Salvatore Lo Piccolo – in 2006 and 2007, Motisi, Pietro Tagliavia, Gianni Nicchi and Salvo Riina – the second-born son of boss of bosses Totò Riina – were considered to be the upcoming young Mafia bosses. However, the whereabouts of Motisi are unknown. According to some observers, Motisi is dead, but the pentito Angelo Casano denies this and maintains that Motisi is hiding in Agrigento, in the south of Sicily.
