= Gaspare Pulizzi =

Member of the Sicilian Mafia

Gaspare Pulizzi is a member of the Sicilian Mafia from Carini near Palermo, Italy. Pulizzi was one of the right-hand men of Mafia boss Salvatore Lo Piccolo, the capo mandamento of the San Lorenzo area in Palermo.

== Biography ==
=== Mafia career ===
Pulizzi was initiated into the Tommaso Natale family of Cosa Nostra in June 2006 in the presence of Salvatore Lo Piccolo, his son Sandro Lo Piccolo, Andrea Adamo and Pippo Di Bello. Asked why he had joined Cosa Nostra, Pulizzi said: "I don’t know. It just happened."

He was arrested on 5 November 2007, together with Lo Piccolo, his son Sandro, and Andrea Adamo, in a villa in Giardinello, between Cinisi and Terrasini.

=== Pentito ===
In January 2008, he decided to collaborate with the Italian authorities. Pulizzi is the third boss of the Lo Piccolo clan who decided to cooperate, after Francesco Franzese and Antonino Nuccio. Pulizzi's relatives were taken away from Carini. His relatives, who clearly didn't support Pulizzi's decision, didn't want police officers to take his wife and kids away – the police were obliged to use force.

Pulizzi confessed to having been involved in the disappearance of the Mafioso Giovanni Bonanno, son of Armando Bonanno, in January 2006. Bonanno had been missing and was a victim of 'lupara bianca', a practice when the victim's body is deliberately hidden. Pulizzi showed Italian police the site of a cemetery unearthed in the city of Villagrazia di Carini, 10 kilometres from the southern Italian city of Palermo.

=== Power struggle ===
Pulizzi was one of Lo Piccolo's soldiers in the power struggle with Antonio Rotolo in Palermo. Rotolo opposed Lo Piccolo's permission for the return of the Inzerillo family. The Inzerillo clan had been sent into exile in the United States after they had lost the Second Mafia War against the Corleonesi in the 1980s. Rotolo had been involved in the killing of members of the Inzerillo clan and feared revenge. He had passed a death sentence on Lo Piccolo and his son.

Pulizzi revealed that the Lo Piccolo's were behind the murders of Bartolomeo Spatola and Nicola Ingarao. Both murdered bosses were allied with Rotolo and the killings represented a strategic move which enabled Lo Piccolo to gain leadership of Palermo's families and districts. Spatola, the 72-year-old boss of the Sferracavallo district of Palermo, disappeared in September 2006. Lo Piccolo's men kidnapped and killed Spatola because he supported Rotolo.

=== Involvement in murders ===
Pulizzi admitted to having formed a hit squad together with Nino Pipitone and Gaspare Di Maggio, to kill Spatola – an associate of Antonino Cinà, the family doctor of Totò Riina and a leading member of Cosa Nostra allied with Rotolo. Due to a mistaken identity, the team killed an innocent passer-by in August 2006. Pulizzi confessed that Sandro Lo Piccolo had strangled Spatola in the second attempt and that he himself had disposed of the body. Cinà had been the padrino at the initiation of Sandro Lo Piccolo, but had been put on the death list of the Lo Piccolo clan, Pulizzi revealed. Just as Gianni Nicchi – a young upcoming boss allied with Rotolo and Cinà.

On 13 June 2007, two hitmen killed 46-year-old mafia boss Nicola Ingarao – another ally of Rotolo. Pullizi and another pentito Andrea Bonaccorso confessed to have killed Ingarao. Bonaccorso drove the motorcycle, while Pulizzi pulled the trigger. Pulizzi said he was forced by Sandro Lo Piccolo to kill Ingarao, who claimed he did not know the area where the killing took place. "Either you do it or you die," Lo Piccolo said, according to Pulizzi. Bonaccorso earned his initiation into Cosa Nostra with the murder.
