= Vito Vitale =

Member of the Sicilian Mafia

Salvatore "Vito" Vitale
- Salvatore Vitale
- Born: Salvatore Vitale; June 20, 1959 (age 67); Partinico, Sicily, Italy
- Other name: Fardazza
- Organization: Sicilian Mafia (Cosa Nostra)
- Known for: Kidnapping and murder of Giuseppe Di Matteo
- Spouse: Maria Lo Baido
- Children: 4
- Allegiance: Corleonesi
- Criminal charges: Arms trafficking murder

Details
- Victims: Giuseppe Di Matteo
- Imprisoned at: 14 April 1998

Salvatore "Vito" Vitale (Italian pronunciation: [salvaˈtoːre ˈviːto viˈtaːle]; born 20 June 1959, in Partinico), also known as Fardazza, is a member of the Sicilian Mafia. For a while he was considered the heir of Totò Riina and was closely connected to Leoluca Bagarella.

== Mafia career ==
Vitale was born in Partinico (Palermo Province). He was the youngest of three brothers. His brothers Leonardo (27.10.1955) and Michele Vitale (21.05.1957) are mafiosi as well. His first arrest was for stealing vegetables, a rather trivial crime for a future mafia boss. On 18 May 1985, an arrest warrant was issued for arms trafficking. After the arrest of his brother Leonardo Vitale, Vito became the head of the family.

He allied himself to the Corleonesi, headed by Totò Riina. His rise in the ranks of Cosa Nostra was due to his proven abilities as a killer and his close connection to Leoluca Bagarella, Riina’s brother-in-law. "He shoots like a god, and is not afraid of anything", according to a pentito – a mafioso turned state witness.

Vitale cooperated in the kidnap and killing of Giuseppe Di Matteo, the son of fellow mafioso Santino Di Matteo, who had become a pentito in 1993. The boy was held for 26 months to force his father to retract his testimony. The boy was finally strangled on the orders of Giovanni Brusca. Subsequently, the body was dissolved in a barrel of acid to destroy the evidence. Vitale, who allegedly supplied the acid, was found guilty of murder and sentenced to life in prison.

== Contrasts in Cosa Nostra ==
In the 1990s a war of power in Partinico set the Geraci family, headed by Nenè Geraci, against the Vitale family. The Geracis, their heir Filippo Nania and their allies the Lo Iaconos were loyal to Bernardo Provenzano, while the Vitales were supported by Totò Riina and Leoluca Bagarella.

According to his sister, the pentita Giusy Vitale, some "young turks" within Cosa Nostra wanted to set aside Bernardo Provenzano in 1998. Next to Vitale they were Giovanni Brusca, Domenico Raccuglia and Matteo Messina Denaro. The younger bosses wanted to take strategic decisions without the prior consent of Provenzano. They told him to "go home and take care of your family".

== Arrest ==
On 28 September 1997, he was stopped and held under observation but managed to escape before he was arrested. He was finally arrested on 14 April 1998. When he was transferred by the police from the police station to prison, they were assaulted by screaming and kicking Vitale blood-family members, including his wife Maria Lo Baido and three of his four children.

== Sister takes over ==
After the arrest of all the Vitale brothers, their sister Giuseppa Vitale took over. Giusy as she is called, was arrested in June 1998 and became a state witness (pentita) in 2005. She gave testimony about her role as family boss, including how she helped Leonardo to organise "a number of murders" from behind bars. Her brother Leonardo, after learning that his sister started to collaborate with Italian justice, said at a trial: "We disown her whether she's living or dead - and we hope it's the latter, and as quickly as possible."

In October 2005, Vitale's rival Maurizio Lo Iacono was shot in Partinico in his car by two men on a scooter with a sawn-off shotgun and a .38 pistol. Lo Iacono died in an ambulance on the way to the hospital. Lo Iacono, released from jail only a couple of months ago, was probably killed because he was attempting to take over the affairs of Vito Vitale. Police speculate that the murder had been ordered by Domenico Raccuglia, who sided with the Vitale clan.
