= Pietro Tagliavia =

Member of the Sicilian Mafia

Pietro Tagliavia (born in 1978) is a member of the Sicilian Mafia. Despite his young age, he is considered to be one of the upcoming leading Mafiosi of Cosa Nostra in Palermo.

== Mafia heritage ==
Pietro Tagliavia is a scion from a historical Mafia family in Palermo. His father Francesco Tagliavia (Palermo, 1954) – also known as "Ciccio Taglia" – and his grandfather and namesake Pietro Tagliavia were leading Mafiosi in the Corso dei Mille neighbourhood. The Tagliavia family owns two fish shops in the Corso dei Mille and the Piazza Sant'Erasmo in Palermo. They were involved in cigarette smuggling and drug trafficking.

His father was one of the members of a hit squad with Giuseppe Lucchese, Giovanni Drago, Filippo La Rosa, Giuseppe Graviano and Agostino Marino Mannoia that committed several murders, among others of relatives of Salvatore Contorno, a mafioso turned pentito (state witness). As an expert in explosives, Francesco Tagliavia was also involved in the bomb attack that killed Antimafia judge Paolo Borsellino on 19 July 1992. He was arrested on 23 May 1993. He received several life sentences and was submitted to the harsh Article 41-bis prison regime.

== Mother aiding and abetting Cosa Nostra ==
His mother, Giuseppa Sansone, was the first woman to be charged with aiding and abetting Cosa Nostra in July 1997. After the arrest of her husband, she continued the family business with her son, collecting the pizzo (extortion money) and instructing drug runners. She acted as an intermediary between her husband in jail and the Graviano brothers, the Mafia bosses of Brancaccio, the mandamento of the Corso dei Mille Mafia family.

While she visited her husband in prison four times a month, he passed messages in the so-called "baccagghiu", the typical slang of the mafia. They were caught on tape and hidden cameras. Pietro and his grandfather were arrested on July 1, 1997, while his mother was arrested on 19 July 1997. On 7 June 2000, Giuseppa Sansone was sentenced to seven years in prison and her son Pietro and his grandfather were sentenced as well. She was later absolved.

== Arrest ==
Pietro Tagliavia was arrested again on 22 February 2005, in Rome together with the reigning Mafia boss of Brancaccio, Benedetto Graviano, Cesare Lupo, and Tagliavia's uncle Ludovico Sansone. Police described Tagliavia as one of the colonels of Graviano in charge with running protection rackets, drug dealing and public contracts in Palermo, while Graviano stayed in Rome to avoid police surveillance. Tagliavia was convicted for extortion and the sentence was confirmed in appeal to 8 years imprisonment on 23 January 2008.

After the arrest of older generation bosses of Cosa Nostra – such as Bernardo Provenzano, Antonio Rotolo and Salvatore Lo Piccolo – in 2006 and 2007, Pietro Tagliavia, Gianni Nicchi and Salvo Riina – the second-born son of the boss of bosses Totò Riina – were considered to be the upcoming young Mafia bosses. Their fate depends on the decisions of the older bosses, most of whom are in jail. According to Antonio Ingroia, one of the prosecutors of the Direzione Distrittuale Antimafia (DDA) of Palermo, the main leading figures in Cosa Nostra at the moment, Matteo Messina Denaro, Giovanni Riina, Domenico Raccuglia, Tagliavia and Nicchi, are still too young to be recognized as leading bosses of the organisation.

== References and sources ==
- (in Italian) Cronologia dei fatti di mafia, Centro Siciliano di Documentazione "Giuseppe Impastato"
