= Borgetto =

- Comune
- Comune di Borgetto
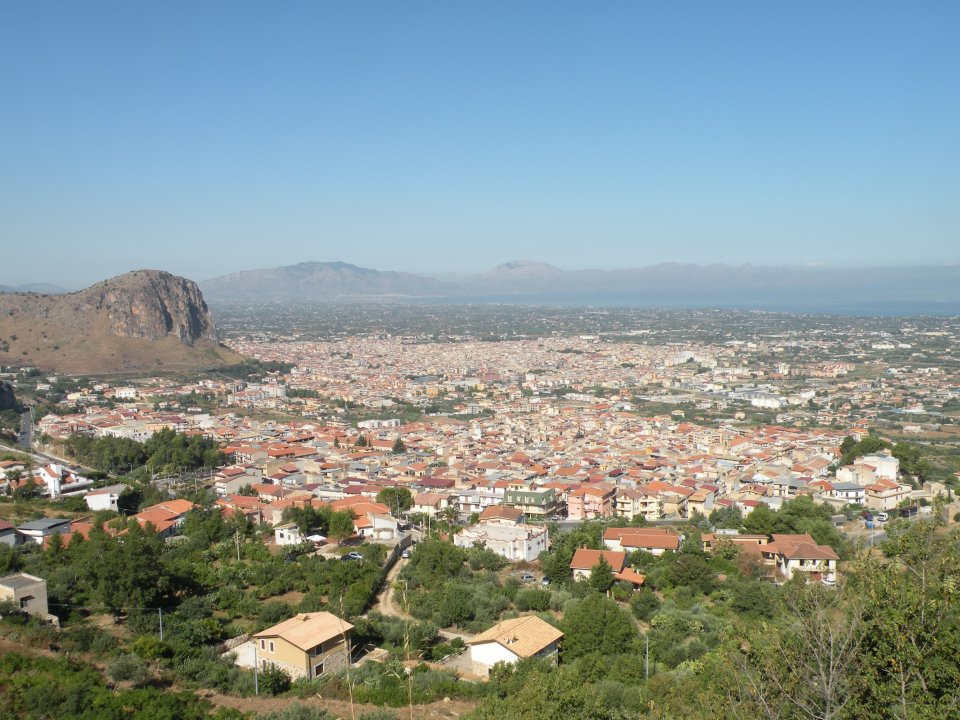
- Panorama of Borgetto

- Location within Italy Location within Sicily
- Coordinates: 38°3′N 13°9′E
- Country: Italy
- Region: Sicily
- Metropolitan city: Palermo (PA)
- Frazioni: Partinico, Giardinello, Montelepre, Monreale

Area
  - Total: 25 km^{2} (9.7 sq mi)
- Elevation: 290 m (950 ft)

Population (31 December 2012)
  - Total: 7,394
  - Density: 300/km^{2} (770/sq mi)
- Demonym: Borgettani
- Time zone: UTC+1 (CET)
  - Summer (DST): UTC+2 (CEST)
- Postal code: 90042
- Dialing code: 091
- ISTAT code: 082013
- Website: Official website

Borgetto (Sicilian: Lu Burgettu) is a small mountain Italian town of the Metropolitan City of Palermo in Sicily. As of 2012 Borgetto had an estimated population of 7,394. The town overlooks the northern coastline of Sicily.

== History ==
The origins of Borgetto are disputed. The two largely accepted theories are that Borgetto was set up as vantage point over the Mediterranean Sea by Arab invaders. Thus, comes the root of Borgetto, Burj, which translates to tower in Arabic. Borgetto is the combination of Burj (tower) and -etto (a suffix meaning small in Italian).

The other theory is that Borgetto was set up by the Greeks as Greek ruins are commonplace throughout Sicily. This theory, however, is based on theory as opposed to fact.

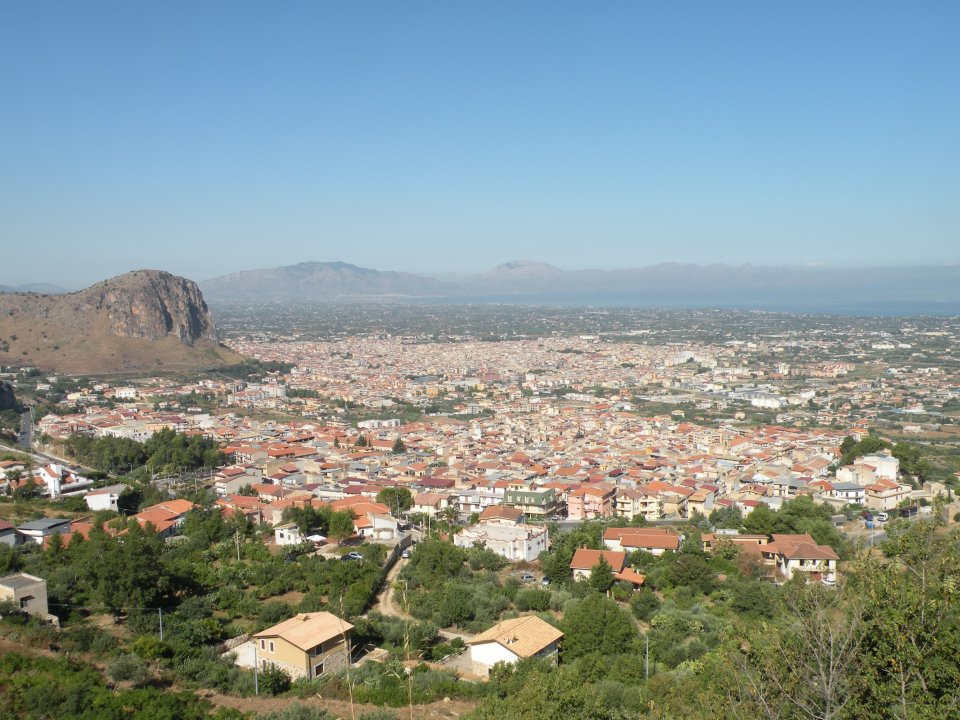
Borgetto (foreground) and Partinico (middle of photo)
