= Giardinello massacre =

- Part of Fasci Siciliani
- A print reproducing the massacre of Giardinello at the time
- Location: Giardinello in the Province of Palermo, Sicily
- Date: December 10, 1893
- Target: Villagers protesting against taxes during the Fasci Siciliani.
- Attack type: Massacre
- Deaths: 11 killed, 12 wounded
- Perpetrators: Government troops and local field guards
- Motive: Quell the protest of the peasants

The Giardinello massacre took place on December 10, 1893, in Giardinello in the Province of Palermo (Sicily) during the Fasci Siciliani uprising. Eleven people were killed and 12 seriously wounded after a rally that asked for the abolition of taxes on food and disbandment of the local field guards (guardie campestri). The protestors carried the portrait of the King taken from the municipality and burned tax files.

== Background and conflict ==
The Fascio dei Lavoratori of Giardinello was founded on November 13, 1893, just a few weeks before the massacre and demanded to abolish taxes and duties on consumer goods and carts. A first explosion of discontent occurred on December 3, 1893 with the demonstration of women to demand a public laundry that had been assured and which was essential for the needs of the population.

On December 10, the rally took place after Sunday Mass in the village of 814 inhabitants at the time. On leaving Mass, in front of the church a demonstration began, shouting: "Down with the taxes and the Town Hall" (Abbasso le tasse e il Municipio) and "Down with the field guards and the policemen" (Abbasso le guardie campestri e i birri).

Things got out of hand when the manifestation reached the house of the mayor next to the town hall. The mayor's wife poured a bucket of water on the crowd from the window shouting: "I will cool down the heads of these bastards." The premises were looted and part of the furniture and tax files were set on fire. Some demonstrators, mostly women, mastered two portraits of the king and the national flag, returned to the streets to demonstrate shouting: "Long live the House of Savoy", "Long live the King", "Long live the Queen".

Troops were hastily summoned from Montelepre. When the situation was quieting down, shots were suddenly fired from the mayor's house leaving eight people dead on the spot and many seriously wounded. In revenge the town clerk and his wife were killed by the angry mob. According to some accounts their heads were stuck on pikes.

== Aftermath ==
The Giardinello massacre was the first in a series of bloody incidents that would lead up to the proclamation of a state of siege by Prime minister Francesco Crispi on January 4, 1894, that would crack down heavily on the Fasci. On December 17, 1893, many people were wounded when troops fired on a manifestation in Monreale. Another 11 protestors were killed in Lercara Friddi on December 25. On January 1, 1894, 20 people were killed and many wounded in Gibellina and Pietraperzia. On January 2, there were two dead in Belmonte Mezzagno and the next day 18 dead and many wounded in Marineo. Two days after, on January 5, thirteen dead and many wounded closed the series in Santa Caterina.

A report of police that carefully examined the location of the corpses of the killed peasants and the types of bullets that had produced the death, concluded that the victims were taken between two fires: one of the shots fired by the military troops with machine gun bullets and the bullets fired by rural guards, who fired rifles.

The head of field guards, the local Mafia boss Girolamo Miceli, was acquitted for lack of evidence at the trial by Military Court of Trapani on March 7–10, 1894, while three peasant leaders were sentenced to life imprisonment, among them Giuseppe Piazza and Salvatore Piazza, one of whom was the President of the Fascio.
