= Yasar Avni Musullulu =

Turkish drug and arms trafficker (1942–2015)

Yaşar Avni Musullulu (1942, Çayeli, Rize – May 2, 2015, Istanbul) was a notorious Turkish drug and arms trafficker with extensive international ties.

Originally bearing the surname Karadurmuş, he changed his name prior to the 1980s and would go on to become one of the most enigmatic and influential figures in Turkey’s underground world. Known by many aliases, including "Sarı Avni", "Atilla" and "The Turkish Escobar".

Musullulu’s life was marked by high-level criminal operations, serving as a key morphine supplier to the Cosa Nostra, alleged intelligence connections, and deep involvement in both domestic and international scandals.

== Early criminal career and rise ==
Throughout the 1970s and 1980s, Musullulu built a reputation as a major player in narcotics and arms trafficking. He was accused of smuggling 5,414 pistols and over 4.3 million bullets into Turkey, while exporting 2 tons of cannabis and 500 kilograms of heroin. His criminal activities placed him on Interpol’s Red Notice list, and he was also named in reports by the U.S. Drug Enforcement Administration (DEA) as one of the world’s most prominent heroin traffickers. Before the 1980 Turkish coup d'état, he was reportedly linked to politically charged massacres in Balgat and Bahçelievler, and was said to have ties to nationalist groups. Musullulu stated that he met notorious smuggler Abuzer Uğurlu in Sofia in 1970 and collaborated with Kintex, a Bulgarian state-linked company involved in arms smuggling. Together, they trafficked thousands of firearms and ammunition from Bulgaria to Turkey over several years. Later, others such as Hasan Conkara and Mustafa Kalafat joined the operation, handling transport via boats.

== International operations and high-profile allegations ==
After fleeing Turkey in 1983, Musullulu spent over a decade abroad, residing in luxury estates across Switzerland and Spain. During this period, Musullulu established a powerful presence abroad, immersing himself in international criminal networks. Among his most significant connections was his close relationship with the Sicilian Mafia, with whom he reportedly collaborated on large-scale heroin trafficking and money laundering operations. His name surfaced in connection with the infamous "Pizza Connection" case, a massive investigation that exposed the global narcotics trade between the Sicilian Cosa Nostra and U.S.-based crime families. Musullulu was believed to be a key figure in the financial side of this network, laundering drug money across Europe. He also developed alliances with the Bulgarian mafia, setting up a heroin laboratory that operated across borders. His name was further implicated in the Iran–Contra affair, and there were claims that weapons used in the attempted assassination of Pope John Paul II had been supplied through his smuggling routes.

== Arrest and imprisonment ==
Returning to Turkey in the early 1990s, Musullulu settled in Altınoluk under a false identity, Rıza Ekşioğlu. Claiming to suffer from asthma and to be the owner of a curtain factory in Istanbul, he created a convincing facade of normalcy. This illusion was shattered in November 1998, when undercover police, posing as buyers of a summer villa, arrested him in a restaurant, famously telling him: “The game is over. We are the police. We’ve come to take you.” During his trial, Musullulu denied drug trafficking and claimed involvement only in cigarette smuggling. Nonetheless, on May 5, 1999, he was sentenced to 8 years and 9 months in prison for cannabis trafficking. He was released on May 6, 2002, under a conditional release law.

== Later years and death ==
Following his release, Musullulu withdrew from public life. Suffering from prostate cancer, he died on May 2, 2015, at the age of 73, at Metropolitan Hospital in Gayrettepe, Istanbul. He died surrounded by his children and close relatives. His burial was as quiet as his final years, taking with him many secrets of the criminal underworld and alleged deep-state connections. According to testimonies like that of Behçet Cantürk, Musullulu, code-named "Atilla" in the underground world, was one of the most significant yet mysterious figures in the history of Turkish organized crime.
