= Giuseppe Mangion =

Member of the Sicilian mafia

Giuseppe "Enzo" Mangion (born 1959) is a Sicilian mafioso and widely recognized as a senior member of the notorious Catania Mafia family.

== Criminal career ==
Born in 1959, "Enzo" Mangion is the son of Francesco Mangion, known as "Ciuzzu u Firraru", man of honour, close confidant, and lieutenant of Catania mafia boss Benedetto Santapaola. Enzo inherited not only familial ties to organized crime but also a central role in its continuation.

Mangion's criminal involvement spans many decades. He was first judicially recognized for his integral participation in the mafia association, as well as for crimes including robbery and extortion committed between 2001 and 2002. These led to a conviction under the "Dionisio" anti-mafia operation, launched in 2005. Though he served time, his legal representatives claimed that his sentence had been effectively completed due to earned early release allowances.

In addition to his criminal convictions, Mangion was named in multiple high-profile legal proceedings, including the "Garibaldi" case, which concerned mafia infiltration in public hospital contracts. In wiretapped conversations cited in judicial documents, Mangion discussed longstanding associations with political figures such as Senator Pino Firrarello, dating back to 1986. These accounts detail how Mangion interceded with his then-fugitive father to end harassment suffered by Firrarello. The tribunal later transferred evidence to the public prosecutor, though the associated case was eventually dismissed.

In 2021, investigators reconstructed the close ties between Enzo Mangion and Antonio Tomaselli, who served as acting head of the Catania Mafia family and a key figure within the Ercolano faction between 2016 and 2017. This connection emerged during one of the proceedings stemming from the broader "Samael" investigation. According to testimony provided by a ROS officer during the trial, Mangion was identified as the individual responsible for managing the clan's laundered funds—effectively serving as Cosa Nostra's financial safe-keeper. Surveillance operations, including hidden cameras and wiretaps, captured direct money exchanges at Mangion's residence, where he allegedly collaborated with figures such as Giuseppe Cesarotti, believed to have been tasked with reinvesting the illicit capital accumulated by the Santapaola, Ercolano, and Mangion families throughout the 1970s, 1980s, and 1990s.

In 2022, the Court of Appeal reaffirmed a 2009 conviction for mafia association, imposing a definitive sentence of 19 years and 3 months. As of 2025, Mangion remains incarcerated. Judicial authorities have repeatedly emphasized his high-ranking position within the criminal network, his ongoing ability to transmit and receive instructions, and the strategic role played by family ties, particularly with his sister Francesca and her husband, Aldo Ercolano, believed to be the leader of the Ercolano faction of the Catania Mafia.

According to the court, Mangion's communications, either in person, by phone, or through prison visits, continue to pose a risk of maintaining and reinforcing the mafia's operational structure. The sustained implementation of restrictive measures is seen as necessary both to prevent obstruction of justice and to limit the mafia's influence in the Catania region.
