= Carmelo Patti =

Italian businessman

- Carmelo Patti
- Born: c. 1934
- Died: 2016 (aged 81–82)
- Occupation: Businessman

Carmelo Patti (c. 1934 – 2016) was an Italian businessman with close links to the Mafia. He was closely associated with Matteo Messina Denaro, a Mafia godfather arrested on January 16, 2023, after 30 years of being in hiding. In 2018, Italian police seized 1.5 billion euros in assets from Patti's family on the basis that it was related to the proceeds of crime. This was later cancelled.
