= Mustafa Pehlivanoğlu =

- Born: March 3, 1958; Ayaş, Ankara Province, Turkey
- Died: October 7, 1980 (aged 22); Mamak Prison, Mamak, Ankara
- Cause of death: hanging

Mustafa Pehlivanoğlu (March 3, 1958 - October 7, 1980), was a Turkish ultranationalist militant. He was tried on August 10, 1978, allegedly for shooting four coffee lounges, killing 5 people and injuring 12, and was sentenced to death on October 18, 1979.

== Background ==
Mustafa Pehlivanoğlu was born in Ayaş on March 3, 1958, and was involved in ultranationalist circles. During the Balgat massacre, on August 10, 1978, at around 21.00 in the Balgat district of Ankara, three coffee lounges, usually full of left-wingers, and two coffee lounges, usually full of Idealists, were the target of a drive-by shooting. Five people died, twelve people were injured as a result. In the investigation, it was determined that Pehlivanoğlu and Haydar Şahin, were the ones who carried out the attacks.

== Trial, escape, and execution ==
On December 18, 1978, in Ankara, his trial started at the High Criminal Court. In addition to the Balgat Massacre, Mustafa Pehlivanoğlu was also tried for robbing a truck driver for an American factory in Balgat. The prosecutor demanded that he'd be charged with extortion, armed robbery, and murder. Emin Metin, a witness in the incident, said that a week before the massacre, Pehlivanoğlu was the coffee lounge where he was beaten by multiple leftists, and that Pehlivanoğlu said, "I will make this place your graves." He was sentenced to death, and his death file was sent to the Turkish Grand National Assembly. Meanwhile, he escaped from the Mamak Military Prison, despite being heavily guarded. Necati Gültekin, Secretary General of the Nationalist Movement Party, said that he "did not know about the incident and could not comment". Atilla Sav, President of the Union of Turkish Bar Associations, said, "you catch him, you punish him, and then he runs away. When this is the case, the situation that deters the crime disappears." The Prison Director was fired from his job. He was caught in Kütahya on August 16, 1980. In the interrogation, he said that he escaped from prison by digging his way out of the ceiling and wearing civilian clothes he bought. Pehlivanoğlu was sentenced to execution, and after the 1980 Turkish coup d'état when martial law was declared, he was hanged on October 7, 1980, in Mamak Prison.

Idealist sources claim that Pehlivanoğlu was a victim of false accusation, and did not commit the shootings.
