= Lercara Friddi massacre =

Massacre in Lercara Friddi, Sicily, Italy

- Part of Fasci Siciliani
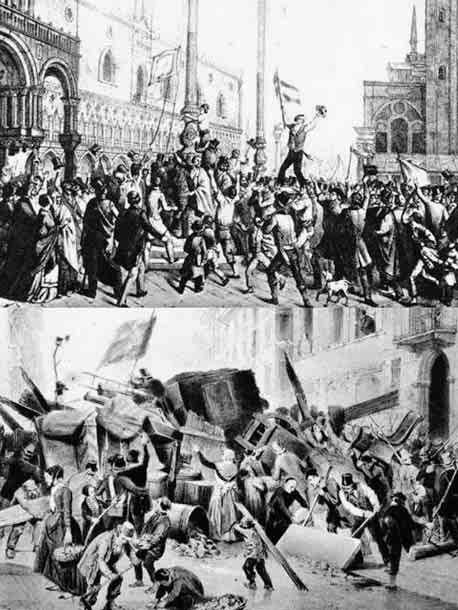
- Prints reproducing the massacre at Lercara Friddi at the time
- Location: Lercara Friddi in the Province of Palermo, Sicily
- Date: December 25, 1893
- Target: Villagers protesting against taxes during the Fasci Siciliani.
- Attack type: Massacre
- Deaths: 7 or 11 killed, many wounded
- Perpetrator: Royal Italian Army
- Motive: Quell the protest of the peasants and miners

The Lercara Friddi massacre took place on Christmas-day (December 25) 1893 in Lercara Friddi in the Province of Palermo (Sicily) during the Fasci Siciliani uprising. According to different sources either seven or eleven people were killed and many wounded. (The New York Times reporting a day after the riots mentioned four people dead.)

== Background of the massacre ==
At the time of the uprising the town had 18,000 inhabitants and was mainly a town of sulphur miners. Working conditions in the mines were appalling, including child labour by so-called carusi.

The Fascio dei Lavoratori in Lercara Friddi had been founded between July and September 1893 among peasants and sulphur miners. On November 8, 1893, a committee was formed to negotiate with the landowners and mine-owners to improve working conditions. However, the political situation was also marked by a fierce battle between the Sartorio and the Nicolosi families about who would rule the town. Different "spurious" elements were present in the Fascio of Lercara Friddi that responded more to the logic of the struggle for the conquest of power between the powerful local town families, rather than the need for social emancipation of the workers.

Serious disagreements emerged within the Fascio, and Bernardino Verro, the charismatic leader of the Fascio in Corleone, was asked to intervene. He arrived on December 19, 1893, and found a chaotic situation and irresponsible spending of the organisation's funds. He dissolved the organisation and nominated a committee to reorganise it. The intervention of Verro caused discontent, in particular with the former secretary Francesco Piazza. The dissenters wanted to organise a demonstration the next day, but were stopped by Verro, claiming that violence against the tax tollhouses and municipality would be counterproductive and that in the strictly organized movement in Corleone these kinds of disorders did not happen. However, after Verro left, the protests did erupt.

== The massacre ==
Already on December 24, protesters against high excise duties had sacked and burned tollhouses. Royal Italian Army troops were sent to the town. The next day, on Christmas, several thousand protestors gathered again at the central square before the municipality. Their shouts Down with taxes! Down with the mayor! were greeted with Death to the instigators! from the balconies of the houses of the affluent on the main square.

The sub-prefect of Palermo tried to calm down the rally, promising the abolition of the duties, while addressing them from the balcony of the town hall. He had to withdraw because the protesters started throwing rocks. With the public prosecutor and the examining magistrate, he was forced to flee by climbing down a window at the back. On the square, protesters with rocks and sticks confronted soldiers that opened fire when the mob risked to break through, leaving several dead and many wounded.

== Aftermath ==
The Lercara Friddi massacre was one of the first in a series of bloody incidents that would lead up to the proclamation of a state of siege by Prime minister Francesco Crispi on January 4, 1894, that would crack down heavily on the Fasci. Eleven people were killed on December 10, 1893, at the Giardinello massacre. On December 17, 1893, many people were wounded when troops fired on a manifestation in Monreale. On January 1, 1894, 20 people were killed and many wounded in Gibellina and Pietraperzia. On January 2, there two dead in Belmonte Mezzagno and the next day 18 dead and many wounded in Marineo. Two days after, on January 5, thirteen dead and many wounded closed the series in Santa Caterina.

Many protesters were tried for a Military Tribunal, including Bernardino Verro who was sentenced to 16 years, a penalty of 500 lire and three years of special surveillance, for his involvement and speech at Lercara Friddi just before the massacre. Despite the fact that he had not been present when the violence broke out and that in fact he had actually tried to calm down local hotheads.
