= Balgat massacre =

Terror attack by Right wing Turkish extremists

Balgat Massacre
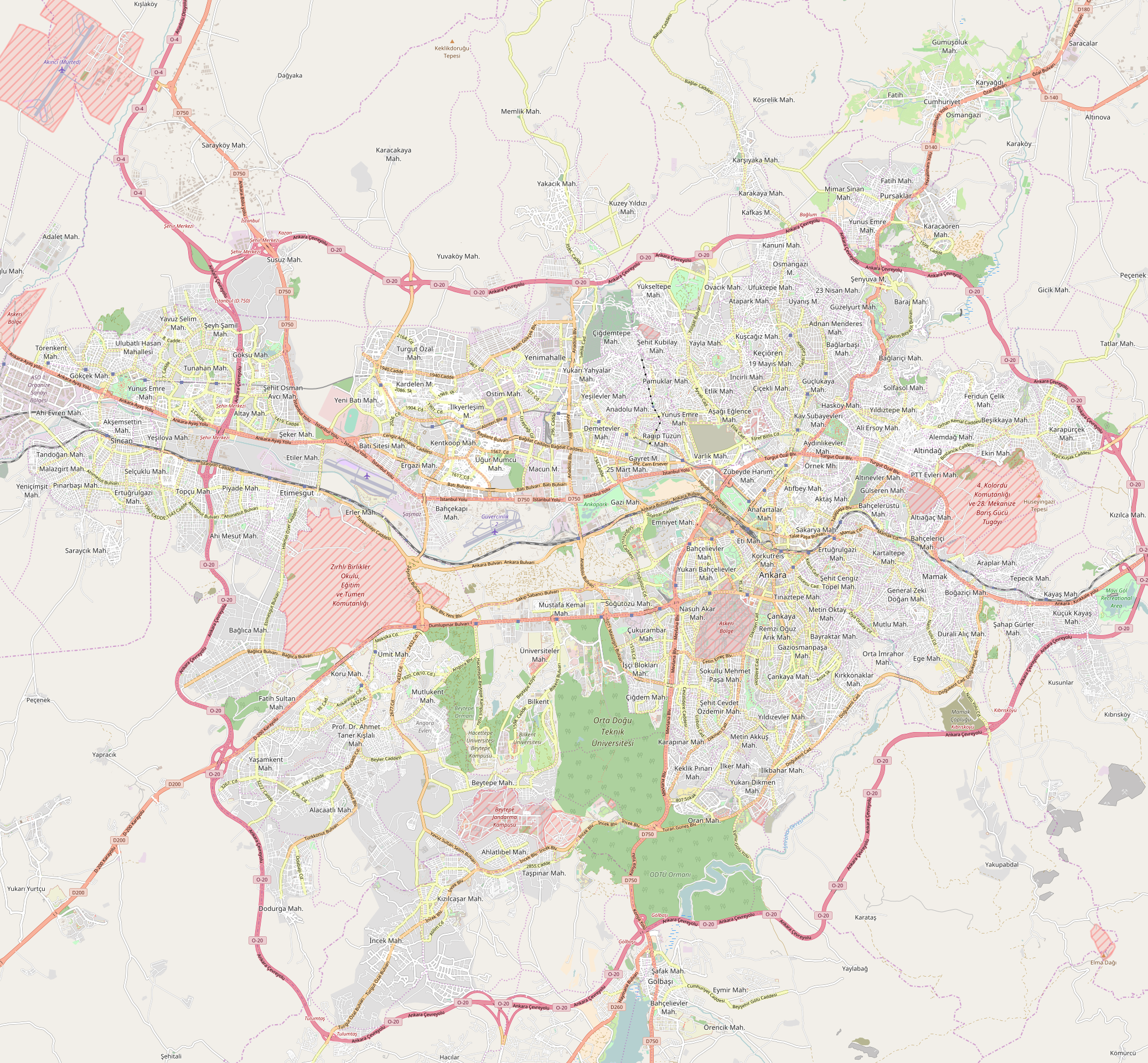
- Balgat massacre (Ankara)
- Location: 39.9244°N 32.8856°E; Çankaya, Ankara, Turkey
- Date: 10 August 1978
- Target: Left-wing civilians
- Attack type: Political violence
- Deaths: 5
- Injuries: 14
- Perpetrators: Mustafa Pehlivanoğlu and İsa Armağan

The Balgat massacre (Turkish: Balgat katliamı) of 10 August 1978 was a mass shooting targeting three coffeehouses known with their left-wing customers in Çankaya, Ankara, in which five died and 14 were injured. The massacre was ordered by Abdullah Çatlı. Two people, Mustafa Pehlivanoğlu and İsa Armağan, were arrested related to the incident. Pehlivanoğlu was executed on 7 October 1980 and Armağan escaped from prison. He was caught in 1995 and was sentenced to ten years of imprisonment. However, he was released after seven years. According to some idealist sources, Mustafa Pehlivanoğlu was a victim of false accusation and had no connections to the incident.
