= Gianni Nicchi =

Member of the Sicilian Mafia

Gianni Nicchi

Giovanni "Gianni" Nicchi (Italian pronunciation: [dʒoˈvanni ˈdʒanni ˈnikki]; born 16 February 1981 in Turin) is a member of the Sicilian Mafia. Despite his relatively young age – he is nicknamed 'u picciutteḍḍu ("the little boy") – he is considered to be one of the leading mafiosi of Cosa Nostra in Palermo. He had been on the "most wanted list" of the Italian Ministry of the Interior since 2006, until his arrest on 5 December 2009.

== Mafia heritage ==
Gianni Nicchi is the son of Luigi Nicchi, a mafioso, who is jailed for life. He is considered to be the current reggente (regent) of the Pagliarelli mandamento, after the arrest of his godfather Antonio Rotolo on 20 June 2006, two months after the arrest of Mafia boss Bernardo Provenzano. Authorities issued 52 arrest warrants against the top echelon of Cosa Nostra in the city of Palermo (Operation Gotha). Nicchi escaped arrest.

"Gianni is my godson (Italian: figlioccio), but I tell you, for me it is as if he was my son," Rotolo was overheard saying to another mafioso. "From this day on, you have to know that when you talk to him it is as if you talk to me. It is the same." In other bugged conversations, police listened in on how Rotolo instructed Nicchi how to kill a person. They also discussed how to extort Chinese shopkeepers in Palermo.

Despite his age, other mafiosi treated Nicchi with respect. The pentito Francesco Campanella recalled when he was introduced to Nicchi by Nicola Mandalà, Mafia boss of Villabate, in 2004. "He treated him with high esteem," Campanella noticed, and Mandalà told him: "you don't realize who that is, even though they call him 'u picciutteddu." Campanella understood that the young man was already regarded as an important figure in Cosa Nostra.

== Mission to the US ==
Rotolo was worried about the return of members of the Inzerillo family to Palermo and fell out with rival boss Salvatore Lo Piccolo over a request from the Inzerillos to be allowed to return to Palermo. The Inzerillo family had been one of the clans that were decimated by the Corleonesi during the Second Mafia War in the 1980s and had been forced into exile in the United States with their relatives in the New York City-based Gambino crime family. Rotolo had been part of the Mafia clans that had attacked the Inzerillo clan and had personally killed one of them. He was opposed to Lo Piccolo’s permission for the return of the Inzerillos, fearing revenge.

Several Sicilian Mafia clans established new ties with the Gambino family to profit from increased international drug trafficking and provide Palermo's Mafia factions an opportunity to launder their earnings in real estate in the United States. Rotolo sent Nicchi to the United States to check the links of Frank Cali of the Gambino family, who is often seen with old heroin traffickers of the Pizza Connection such as Pietro Inzerillo.

== Clash with Lo Piccolo ==
Rotolo did not like what Nicchi reported back and did not believe the assurances of Calì, which he considered excuses to reinstate the Inzerillos in Palermo. Rotolo passed a death sentence on Salvatore Lo Piccolo and his son, Sandro – and procured the barrels of acid that are used to dissolve the bodies of slain rivals. Nicchi was ordered to search out and kill the fugitive father and son Lo Piccolo.

When Rotolo was arrested on 20 June 2006, the Lo Piccolos went after Nicchi. They ordered Francesco Franzese, boss of the Partanna Mondello Mafia family, to find and kill him. However, Franzese was arrested on 2 August 2007. On a pizzino found at Franzese's house, Sandro Lo Piccolo ordered the killing of "Tiramisù", the name that was given to indicate Nicchi. Apparently, Nicchi had fled to Milan and escaped a hit team organized by Franzese.

== New power in Cosa Nostra? ==
Nicchi's fortunes changed after the arrest of Salvatore Lo Piccolo and his son Sandro on 5 November 2007. Nicchi is considered one of the new powers in Cosa Nostra in Palermo. Other youngsters on their way up are Pietro Tagliavia, born in 1978, a scion from the Corso dei Mille Mafia family, and Salvo Riina, born in 1977 – the second-born son of the boss of bosses Totò Riina – who was arrested in 2001 but released in 2007 when the Supreme Court annulled his sentence.

Palermo police chief Giuseppe Caruso described Nicchi as "a young man with grey matter and energy ... and ready to rise to the leadership of Cosa Nostra, at least in Palermo." His name is now among the candidate leaders of Cosa Nostra, along with Matteo Messina Denaro and Domenico Raccuglia. According to prosecutor Francesco Del Bene, who coordinated the arrest of Lo Piccolo: "Gianni Nicchi is a killer, now he should be emerging, but he is the only one left from the Corleonesi faction."

According to Antonio Ingroia, one of the prosecutors of the Direzione Distrettuale Antimafia (DDA) of Palermo, the main leading figures in Cosa Nostra at the moment, Matteo Messina Denaro, Giovanni Riina, Domenico Raccuglia, Pietro Tagliavia and Nicchi, are still too young to be recognized as leading bosses of the organization.

On 21 January 2008, the Palermo Court convicted the fugitive Nicchi and sentenced him to 18 years in prison. Because he was tried under a special short procedure, he received a 1/3 reduction on his sentence. He was indicted on 7 February 2008, in operation Old Bridge against the Gambinos in New York and their connections in Palermo, involved in drug trafficking.

== Arrest ==
On 5 December 2009, Italian police arrested him in Palermo. He is incarcerated in the special security prison in L'Aquila under the strict Article 41-bis prison regime.

In September 2010 he went on a hunger strike for two weeks demanding to see his two children who were born while he was a fugitive. He had not acknowledged the children while he was on the run so officially they are not his. He has started the process to officially acknowledge them.
