= Santino Di Matteo =

Italian mafia member

Santino Di Matteo (born 7 December 1954), also known as Mezzanasca, is an Italian former member of the Sicilian Mafia from the town of Altofonte in the province of Palermo, Sicily, Italy.

Di Matteo took part in the killing of anti-Mafia judge Giovanni Falcone on 23 May 1992, near Capaci and also of the businessman Ignazio Salvo. After his arrest on 4 June 1993, he became the first of Falcone's assassins to become a government witness—a pentito. He revealed all the details of the assassination: who tunnelled beneath the motorway, who packed the 13 drums with TNT and Semtex, who hauled them into place on a skateboard, and who pressed the button to set them off.

== Killing of his son ==
In retaliation for Di Matteo becoming an informant, the Mafia kidnapped his 12-year-old son, Giuseppe Di Matteo, on 23 November 1993, on the orders of Giovanni Brusca and Leoluca Bagarella. According to a later confession by one of the kidnappers, Gaspare Spatuzza, they dressed as police officers and told the boy he was being taken to see his father, who was at that time being kept in police protection on the Italian mainland.

Di Matteo made a desperate trip to Sicily to try to negotiate his son's release, but on 11 January 1996, after 779 days, the boy, who by now had also become physically ill due to mistreatment and torture, was strangled and his body was subsequently dissolved in a barrel of acid—a practice known colloquially as the lupara bianca. The murderers were Enzo Brusca, brother of Giovanni, Vincenzo Chiodo and Salvatore Monticciolo on the orders of Giovanni Brusca.

In 1997, Di Matteo and Brusca met face-to-face during court proceedings. Bursting into tears, Di Matteo told the judge: "I guarantee my collaboration, but to this animal I guarantee nothing. If you leave me alone with him for two minutes, I'll cut his head off." The confrontation threatened to become violent, but court security guards restrained Di Matteo. Brusca had also asked Giuseppe Di Matteo's family for forgiveness. That year, Di Matteo was sentenced to 15 years in prison.

In 1999, the Corte d'Assise of Palermo sentenced Giovanni Brusca to 30 years in prison, his brother Enzo to 28 years, Vincenzo Chiodo to 27 years, and Giuseppe Monticciolo and Salvatore Grigoli to 20 years each for their roles in the murder. In 2006, after Ciro Vara became a pentito, life sentences were also given to Mario Capizzi, Giovanni Pollari and Salvatore Fragapane, while Ciro Vara himself received 14 years in prison for their roles in the murder. In 2010, after Gaspare Spatuzza became a pentito, Benedetto Capizzi, Fifetto Cannella and Cosimo Lo Nigro were sentenced to 30 years in prison for their roles in the murder. At the trial, Spatuzza had also asked Giuseppe Di Matteo's family for forgiveness. In 2012, Matteo Messina Denaro, Giuseppe Graviano, Salvatore Benigno, Francesco Giuliano, and Luigi Giacalone were sentenced to life imprisonment, while Spatuzza himself was sentenced to 12 years in prison for their roles in the murder. In 2016, Angelo Longo was sentenced to life imprisonment for his role in the murder after testimony from Antonino Giuffrè.

== Release ==
In March 2002, Di Matteo was released early, along with four others, in return for cooperating with magistrates, outraging relatives of Falcone, who stated that the system of pentiti safeguarded killers from prosecution for murder. Despite not having police protection, he decided to return to his family in Altofonte, rather than into hiding. He tried to live a normal life in the town but was shunned by the townspeople.

Before his arrest, Di Matteo had already become hesitant about the violent strategy of the Corleonesi. In their testimonies, Di Matteo and another pentito (Salvatore Cancemi), described the victory celebration that followed the Capaci bombing. Totò Riina ordered French champagne and while the others toasted, Cancemi and Santo Di Matteo looked at one another and exchanged a gloomy assessment of Riina and their future: "This cornuto will be the ruin of us all."

== In popular culture ==
The story of Di Matteo's son Giuseppe's kidnapping and murder was turned into a film, Sicilian Ghost Story.

== See also ==
- List of kidnappings
