= Giuseppe Falsone =

Member of the Sicilian Mafia

Mug shot of Giuseppe Falsone

Giuseppe Falsone (Italian pronunciation: [dʒuˈzɛppe falˈsoːne]; born 28 August 1970 in Campobello di Licata), sometimes spelled as Falzone, is a member of the Sicilian Mafia. He was on the "Most wanted list" of the Italian Ministry of the Interior from January 1999 until his arrest in France in June 2010. He is considered to be one of the bosses of Cosa Nostra in the province of Agrigento, jointly with Gerlandino Messina from Porto Empedocle.

== Mafia heritage ==
Giuseppe Falsone was born in Campobello di Licata in the province of Agrigento, Sicily. He is the son of Vincenzo Falsone (born in 1930), the undisputed Mafia boss of the town for many years. Vincenzo Falsone was well connected to Mafia bosses such as Giuseppe Settecasi, Carmelo Colletti and Giuseppe Di Caro who were capo provincia of Agrigento in the past.

On 24 June 1991, Giuseppe's father Vincenzo Falsone and his elder brother Angelo were killed by the Stidda during a vicious war with Cosa Nostra clans. Giuseppe took over the leadership of the Mafia family when he was not yet 21 years old. In retaliation, Falsone killed Salvatore Ingaglio, responsible for the killing of his father and elder brother. Falsone has been a fugitive since January 1999. He was convicted of Mafia association in 2000 and murder in 2001.

== Capo provincia ==
At a meeting of Mafia families from Agrigento on 14 July 2002, in Santa Margherita di Belice, Mafia bosses were supposed to nominate a new capo provincia after the arrest of Calogero Di Caro, the boss from Canicattì. Mafia boss of bosses Bernardo Provenzano sponsored Falsone, while his rival Maurizio Di Gati was sponsored by Antonino Giuffrè. The police interrupted the summit. Di Gati was able to escape before the raid but he stepped aside as provincial boss for Falsone after the arrest of Giuffrè and due to the opposition of Provenzano to his position. Cesare Lombardozzi, Mafia boss of Agrigento, allegedly smoothed the transition.

== Arrest ==
Falsone's main criminal interests are in extortion and public work contracts. In July 2004 assets worth two million euro were seized by the police, including real estate, 100 hectares of farmland, a winery and transport companies. Falsone's mother, sister and brother were arrested as well. In the pizzini (small slips of paper used to communicate with other mafiosi to avoid phone conversations) with Bernardo Provenzano, Falsone was indicated as number 28.

In June 2008, Falsone just escaped his arrest. Police raided a house in Palazzo Adriano, in the province of Palermo, but he was already gone. In March 2010, police seized more assets from Falsone worth €30 million.

He was arrested on 25 June 2010 in Marseille (France). By then he had undergone plastic surgery and denied being Falsone showing a false French identity card, but his fingerprints gave him away. At the time of his arrest he was considered to be the Mafia boss of the province of Agrigento by police investigators coordinated by Girolamo Di Fazio.
