= Giardinello =

- Comune
- Comune di Giardinello
- Location within Italy Location within Sicily
- Coordinates: 38°5′N 13°9′E
- Country: Italy
- Region: Sicily
- Metropolitan city: Palermo (PA)

Area
  - Total: 12.5 km^{2} (4.8 sq mi)

Population (Dec. 2010)
  - Total: 2,260
  - Density: 181/km^{2} (468/sq mi)
- Time zone: UTC+1 (CET)
  - Summer (DST): UTC+2 (CEST)
- Postal code: 90040
- Dialing code: 091

Giardinello (Sicilian: Jardineḍḍu) is a comune (municipality) in the Metropolitan City of Palermo in the Italian region Sicily, located about 20 kilometres (12 mi) west of Palermo. As of December 2010, it had a population of 2,260 and an area of 12.5 square kilometres (4.8 mi^{2}).

Giardinello borders the following municipalities: Borgetto, Carini, Monreale, Montelepre, Partinico.

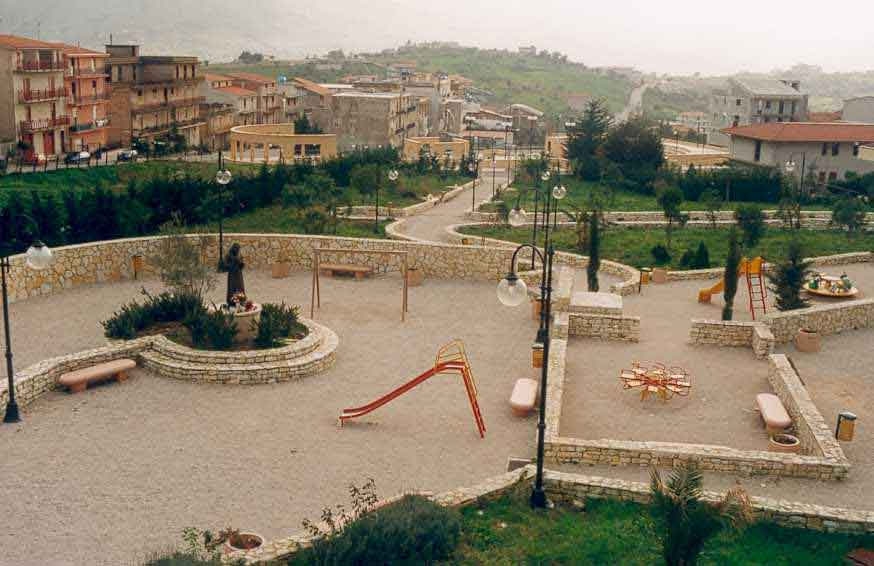
Urban park of Giardinello

== History ==
The town rose as a feudal village in the early 1700s at the foot of San Martino mountains and was populated by inhabitants of the nearby town of Partinico.

On December 10, 1893, eleven people were killed in the Giardinello massacre during the Fasci Siciliani uprising after a rally that asked for the abolition of taxes on food and disbandment of the local field guards. The protestors carried the portrait of the King taken from the municipality and burned tax files.

== Demographic evolution ==
Historical population

Year	Pop.	±%
1861	461	—
1871	693	+50.3%
1881	814	+17.5%
1901	1,069	+31.3%
1911	867	−18.9%

Year	Pop.	±%
1921	1,173	+35.3%
1931	1,191	+1.5%
1936	1,212	+1.8%
1951	1,373	+13.3%
1961	1,284	−6.5%

Year	Pop.	±%
1971	1,344	+4.7%
1981	1,371	+2.0%
1991	1,681	+22.6%
2001	1,900	+13.0%
2010	2,260	+18.9%

Source: Data from ISTAT
