= Francesco Mangion =

Member of the Sicilian Mafia (1936–2002)

- Born: 1936; Catania, Sicily, Kingdom of Italy
- Died: 9 November 2002 (aged 65–66); Catania, Sicily, Italy
- Other name: Ciuzzu u Firraru
- Children: Giuseppe Mangion; Francesco Pattarino (illegitimate)
- Allegiance: Catania Mafia family

Francesco Mangion (1936 – 9 November 2002) was a Sicilian mafioso and a high-ranking member of the Catania Mafia family.

== Criminal career ==
By trade a blacksmith, Mangion became, over the years, one of the most influential members of the Catania Mafia family. He served as the right-hand man and deputy of boss Nitto Santapaola, playing a leading role within the Mafia family. Between the late 1970s and the early 1990s, he headed the group operating in San Giovanni la Punta.

His name publicly emerged in connection with the murder of Vito Lipari, the former mayor of Castelvetrano, who was killed on 13 August 1980. For this crime, he was later sentenced to life imprisonment, sharing the same judicial fate as Nitto Santapaola, Mariano Agate, and Rosario Romeo.

Mangion lived as a fugitive for approximately ten years. During this period, he also hid near his own residence, in an apartment located in a residential area north of Catania. He was arrested on 17 April 1992 by the Catania Mobile Squad. At the time of his capture, he was alone, armed with a .38-calibre pistol, and in possession of approximately six million lire in cash.

According to testimony reported in an official statement by justice collaborator Francesco Pattarino, Mangion’s illegitimate son, during the 1980s, there were allegedly indirect contacts between Mangion and members of the judiciary aimed at “fixing” judicial proceedings. These relations were reportedly mediated by local political figures, including Antonino Drago. The same testimony further claimed that, in 1988, the annulment of several arrest warrants stemming from the declarations of Antonino Calderone was allegedly facilitated through the intervention of Giuseppe Madonia, the boss of Vallelunga Pratameno, who was believed to have influence over magistrate Corrado Carnevale.

His son, Giuseppe Mangion, also became a uomo d'onore and an influential member within the Catania Mafia family.
