= Giusy Vitale =

Member of the Sicilian Mafia

Giusy Vitale, donna d'onore

Giuseppa Vitale (born in Partinico, 1972), better known as Giusy, is the sister of Mafia bosses Leonardo, Michele and Vito Vitale from Partinico, Sicily. Giusy took over the command over the clan when her brothers were in prison or fugitives, despite the formal Mafia rule that excludes the participation of women in the criminal organisation. As such she was considered one of a new breed of 'bosses in skirts'. Later she became a pentita, a state witness breaking the "omertà," or code of silence, testifying against her own family.

== Mafia heritage ==
She was raised in a traditional Mafia family in Partinico, 40 kilometres from Palermo. The Vitale clan had taken over the Partinico mandamento from Nenè Geraci in 1991–92. At the age of six she started to visit prison regularly when her brother Leonardo was jailed. "Life for me was with my brothers," she told a court after she became a state witness. "It was impossible to have any relationship with people of my own age. I had absolutely no idea of how to live a different life."

At the age of 13 she left school. Her brother Leonardo, who was 17 years her major and acted as her father, was jealous, she explained. "I'd reached the third year of middle school but he wouldn't let me go any further." She knew her brothers were men of honour in Cosa Nostra and they kept her informed.

== Capo mandamento ==
Her brothers became fugitives and, later, were arrested and both given long jail sentences for murder. Leonardo and Vito turned to Giusy to keep the clan moving and exchange messages while they were separate. While not a "man of honour" in both senses – women are not allowed to enter the Mafia as made members – Giusy Vitale became the regent of the mandamento after the arrest of her brother Vito in April 1998 and managed the affairs of the Vitale clan, although she could not participate in Mafia meetings.

Her brothers had several reasons to give her the position: their sister was already fully aware of all the secrets of the family because she had been the go-between for the members inside and outside jail.

She showed remarkable resourcefulness and autonomy. The court attributed to Vitale a decisively different role from the one that Mafia women had performed in the past. She took part in the decisions her brothers made in prison, personally contacted leading Mafia personalities, such as Corleone bosses Leoluca Bagarella and Giovanni Brusca. Such an essential position had never been seen involving a woman. Other Mafia bosses accepted the nomination by her brothers, and she could be considered a veritable donna d'onore.

== Arrest ==
Two months after she has assumed the leadership of the mandamento, she was arrested in June 1998. she was sentenced to six years. In December 2002, she was released, but arrested again in March 2003 for ordering a murder.

== Pentita ==
While in jail, Giusy, mother of two, met a pentito, Alfio Garozzo, a former head of the Cursotti clan from Catania. Her husband, Angelo Caleca, was serving time for a killing that she allegedly ordered. In February 2005, she became a state witness (pentita), from behind bars.

She justified her decision to testify simply "for the good of my children." She said: "I want to be a mother and I want to be near my children. They've got to grow up with me. If I stay in prison, I'll lose them." "While I was in jail, they brought my son, who is now 12, to see me. He was about six then.

She petitioned for divorce, violating yet another of the Cosa Nostra's strict rules, which forbids adultery. Vitale today lives outside Sicily under Italy's witness protection programme, and is making a new life for herself with her children.

== Biography ==
- Vitale, Giusy & Camilla Costanzo (2009), Ero cosa loro, Milan: Mondadori, ISBN 978-88-8045-844-9
