= Gerlandino Messina =

Gerlandino Messina.

Gerlandino Messina (Italian pronunciation: [dʒerlanˈdiːno mesˈsiːna]; born on 22 July 1972) is a member of the Mafia in Sicily from Porto Empedocle. He was on the most wanted list of the Italian Ministry of the Interior from 1999 to 2010 when he was captured in Favara.

He is the son of Giuseppe Messina, the Mafia boss of Porto Empedocle, who on 8 July 1986, was killed by the Grassonelli clan, which adhered to the Stidda – a criminal organisation rivaling Cosa Nostra. In revenge, six members of the Grassonelli clan were killed on 21 September 1986, in the so-called Porto Empedocle massacre.

He is considered to be one of the bosses of Cosa Nostra in the province of Agrigento, jointly with Giuseppe Falsone.

On 23 October 2010, he was captured by a special unit of the Carabinieri from his house in Favara, near Agrigento. He was wanted for Mafia association and several murders, including the killing of police officer Giuliano Guazzelli in April 1992.

In 2012, he was sentenced to 9 years and 6 months of imprisonment for illegal possession of firearms.
