= Young Turks (disambiguation) =

Young Turks was a reform movement during the last years of the Ottoman Empire. The phrase young Turks is used more generally for young people who agitate for political or other reform, or who have a rebellious disposition.

Young Turks may also refer to:

== Politics ==
- Young Turks (U.S. politics), a group of Republicans in the 1960s
- Young Turks (Thailand), a clique of military officers which played an important role in the coups during the 1970s and 1980s
- Young Turks (Vietnam), a group of officers who helped Nguyễn Khánh stay in power in the September 1964 South Vietnamese coup attempt
- Young Turks (New Zealand), a group of National Party politicians critical of their party's senior leadership in the early 1960s consisting of Robert Muldoon, Duncan MacIntyre, and Peter Gordon
- Andrea Orlando, Italian politician nicknamed "Young Turk"

== Music ==
- Young Turks (record label), former name of British independent record label Young
- "Young Turks" (song), a 1981 song by Rod Stewart
- Young Turk (rapper), an American rapper

== Gangs ==
- A 1990s Philadelphia street gang under Mafia boss Joey Merlino
- An early 20th century group of young Mafia members opposing the old guard or "Mustache Petes"

== Other uses ==
- The Young Turks (TYT), a U.S.-based progressive, left-wing YouTube show that additionally appears on selected television channels
- Young Turks (Bell Labs), a group of influential scientists who worked at Bell Labs
- Young Turk, a 2004 novel by Moris Farhi, 2004
