= Antonio Rotolo =

Member of the Sicilian Mafia

Mugshot of Mafia boss Antonino Rotolo

Antonino "Nino" Rotolo (born 3 January 1946) is a Sicilian Mafia boss from the Pagliarelli area in Palermo that traditionally was under the control of the Motisi family. Rotolo was the underboss of Matteo Motisi, but according to some pentiti he was the de facto leader representing the mandamento on the Sicilian Mafia Commission. In 2006, the police deduced that Rotolo — Number 25 in the numbered code of Mafia boss Bernardo Provenzano — had become a key figure in Cosa Nostra's hierarchy.

== Ally of the Corleonesi ==
Rotolo was a loyal ally of the Corleonesi of Totò Riina in the Second Mafia War. According to the pentito Giuseppe Marchese, he was part of the hit team that killed Stefano Bontade and he strangled Santo Inzerillo, the brother of Salvatore Inzerillo, with his own hands on 26 May 1981, when Inzerillo came to a meeting to ask clarifications about the killing of his relatives.

Rotolo was actively involved in heroin trafficking in the 1980s. According to Tommaso Buscetta, three Palermo Mafia families dominated heroin trafficking around 1980: the Porta Nuova family with Nunzio La Mattina as the main organizer; the Brancaccio with Giuseppe Savoca and the Pagliarelli family with Antonino Rotolo. Rotolo received morphine base from the Turkish trafficker Yasar Avni Musullulu who delivered the shipments close to the coast of Sicily on Rotolo's indications where they were picked up by smaller fishing boats. The morphine base was refined into heroin at laboratories in Sicily and smuggled to the United States to feed the famous Pizza Connection. One of Rotolo's heroin refiners was Francesco Marino Mannoia after Bontade was killed. Rotolo was also managing the money flow of the proceeds through Swiss bank accounts.

On 31 May 1985, Rotolo was arrested together with Giuseppe Calò in the latter's elegant villa near Rome. He was one of the defendants at the Maxi Trial against Cosa Nostra that started in 1986. According to Francesco Marino Mannoia, who became a pentito, Rotolo was one of the killers of Piersanti Mattarella, the regional president of Sicily at the time. He was also a member of the hit team that killed the communist politician Pio La Torre and the prefect of Palermo, general Carlo Alberto Dalla Chiesa, according to the pentito Calogero Ganci.

== Deputy of Provenzano ==
After the arrest of Bernardo Provenzano on 11 April 2006, the pizzini (small slips of paper used to communicate with other mafiosi to avoid phone conversations) found at his hideout indicated that Provenzano's joint deputies in Palermo were Salvatore Lo Piccolo and Antonino Rotolo. In a message referring to an important decision for Cosa Nostra, Provenzano told Rotolo: "It's up to you, me and Lo Piccolo to decide this thing."

Rotolo was involved in the Sicilian regional election of May 2006, supporting the Union of Christian and Centre Democrats (Unione dei Democratici Cristiani e di Centro, UDC), the party of the incumbent president of the autonomous region of Sicily, Salvatore Cuffaro. "We are ninety-nine per cent oriented towards the UDC", he was overheard saying. Cuffaro won the election, defeating Rita Borsellino, the sister of judge Paolo Borsellino who was killed by the Mafia in 1992.

== Operation Gotha ==
Rotolo was arrested again on 20 June 2006, two months after the arrest of Bernardo Provenzano. The authorities issued 52 arrest warrants against the top echelon of Cosa Nostra in the city of Palermo (Operation Gotha). Among the other arrestees were Rotolo's right-hand men Antonino Cinà (who had been the personal physician of Salvatore Riina and Provenzano) and the builder Francesco Bonura. The raids arose from reading Provenzano's notes in the light of evidence from the eavesdropping operation.

The surveillance operation showed that Rotolo had built a kind of federation within the Mafia, comprising 13 families grouped in four clans. The city of Palermo was ruled by a triumvirate of bosses headed by Rotolo, Cinà and Bonura, comprising 13 families that were grouped into 4 clans, thus replacing Palermo's Mafia Commission.

Rotolo was under house arrest, obtained thanks to pills his doctors had given him to raise his blood pressure and enable him to feign illness. In this way, Rotolo was free to run his business, extracting protection money from Chinese shopkeepers in Palermo and persuading the owner of the Migliore chain to pay up and even join an anti-racket association. He used to meet with his fellow mafiosi in a cabin close to his luxurious suburban villa, along Viale Michelangelo. A football was placed at the door as a sign to the sentries when conferences began. Inside, there was a table, eight plastic chairs and anti-bugging devices which, the eavesdropped conversations revealed, Rotolo thought would make it impossible for police to listen in. However, the police had been able to install bugging devices and a video camera that revealed the Mafia dealings.

== Clash with Lo Piccolo ==
The police investigations indicated a clash between Rotolo and Salvatore Lo Piccolo over a request from the Inzerillo family to be allowed to return to Palermo. The Inzerillo family had been one of the clans whose leaders – among them Salvatore Inzerillo – were killed by the Corleonesi during the second Mafia War in the 1980s and which had been in exile in the United States. Rotolo had been part of the Mafia clans that had attacked the Inzerillo clan and had personally killed one of them. He was opposed to Lo Piccolo's permission for the return of the Inzerillos, fearing revenge.

With the arrest of Rotolo and others, authorities claim they avoided the outbreak of a genuine war inside Cosa Nostra. Rotolo feared a vendetta. "If they start shooting, I'll be the first to get it and then it'll be your turn", he told Bonura. The pair did not trust Lo Piccolo either and sought authorisation from Provenzano to eliminate him. Rotolo had passed a death sentence on Salvatore Lo Piccolo and his son, Sandro – and had procured the barrels of acid that are used to dissolve the bodies of slain rivals. Rotolo's godson, Gianni Nicchi, was ordered to search and kill the fugitive Lo Piccolos.

According to the national Antimafia prosecutor, Piero Grasso, Nino Rotolo "was planning a series of murders to annihilate the family of Salvatore Lo Piccolo and become the undisputed boss of the clan in the city". Killing the Lo Piccolos would have propelled Sicily into another murderous conflict. "The police and the special anti-mafia prosecution service in Palermo have forestalled the outbreak of a genuine war inside Cosa Nostra", said centre-left MP and Mafia expert, Giuseppe Lumia, vice-president of the Antimafia Commission.

In February 2007, Rotolo's assets worth €30 million were seized. Most of the assets were in the name of various frontmen. On 21 January 2008, the Palermo Court sentenced Rotolo to 20 years in prison. Because Rotolo chose to be tried under a special short procedure, he gets a 1/3 reduction on his sentence, effectively shortening it to 13 years and 2 months. He was indicted on 7 February 2008, in Operation Old Bridge against the Gambinos in New York and their connections in Palermo, involved in drug trafficking.

== Sources ==
- Blumenthal, Ralph (1988). Last Days of the Sicilians, New York: Times Books ISBN 0-8129-1594-1
- Paoli, Letizia (2003). Mafia Brotherhoods: Organized Crime, Italian Style, Oxford/New York: Oxford University Press ISBN 0-19-515724-9
- Stajano, Corrado (1986). Mafia. L'atto d'accusa dei giudici di Palermo, Rome: Editori Riuniti
