= Altofonte =

Altofonte Parcu (Sicilian)
- Comune
- Comune di Altofonte
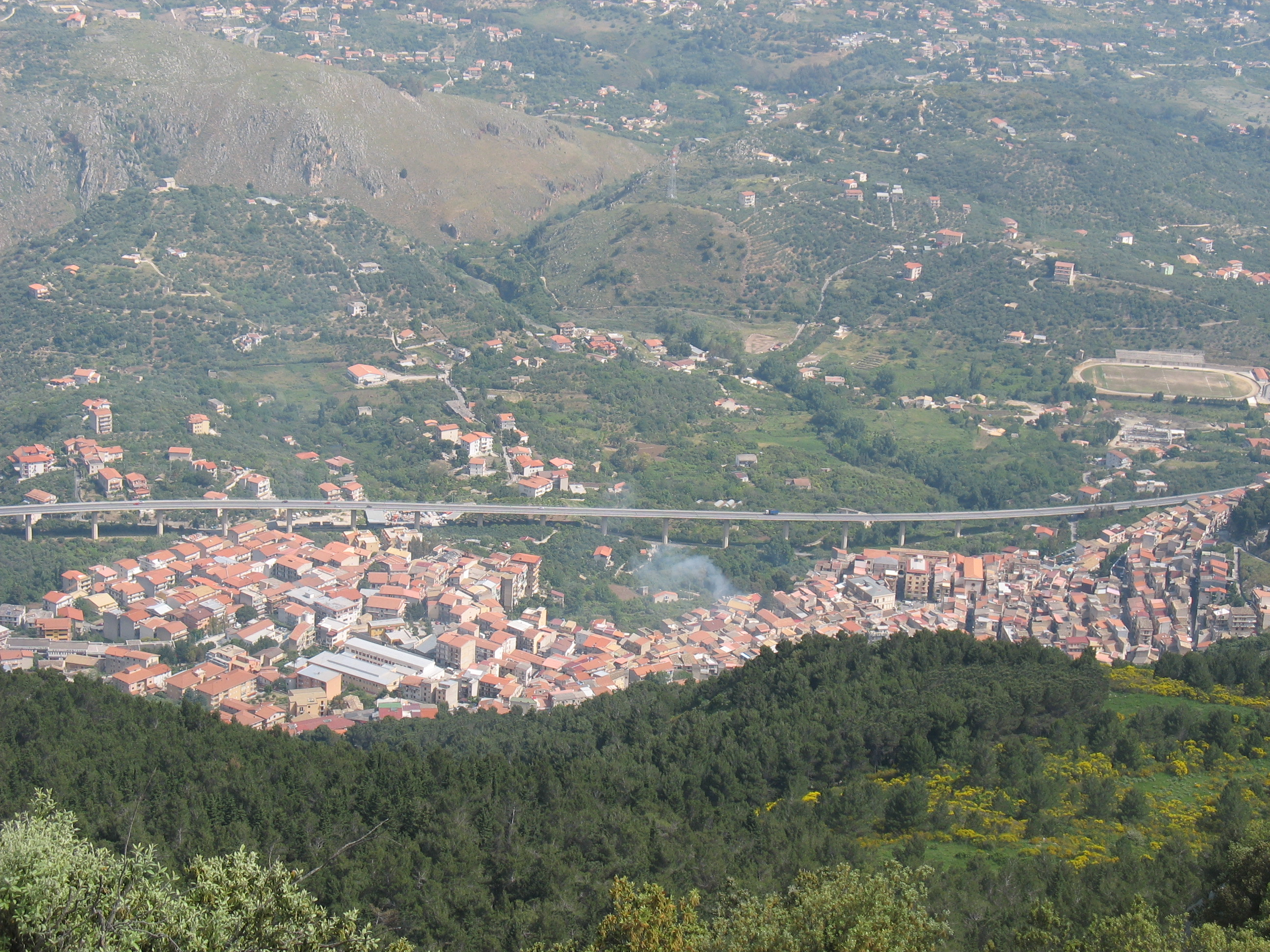

- Location within Italy Location within Sicily
- Coordinates: 38°02′41″N 13°17′55″E
- Country: Italy
- Region: Sicily
- Metropolitan city: Palermo (PA)
- Frazioni: Piano Maglio, Blandino

Government
  - Mayor: Angela De Luca

Area
  - Total: 35 km^{2} (14 sq mi)
- Elevation: 350 m (1,150 ft)

Population (31 December 2013)
  - Total: 10,378
  - Density: 300/km^{2} (770/sq mi)
- Demonym: Altofontini or Parchitani
- Time zone: UTC+1 (CET)
  - Summer (DST): UTC+2 (CEST)
- Postal code: 90030
- Dialing code: 091
- Patron saint: St. Hanna
- Saint day: 26 July
- Website: Official website

Altofonte (Sicilian: Parcu) is a comune (municipality) in the Metropolitan City of Palermo in the Italian region Sicily, located about 9 kilometres (6 mi) southwest of Palermo.

Altofonte borders the following municipalities: Belmonte Mezzagno, Monreale, Palermo, Piana degli Albanesi, San Giuseppe Jato.

== Main sights ==
- Church of Santa Maria in Altofonte, built in 1633.
- Church of San Michele Arcangelo (early 12th century)

== Demographic evolution ==
Historical population

Year	Pop.	±%
1861	3,551	—
1871	4,157	+17.1%
1881	4,606	+10.8%
1901	4,725	+2.6%
1911	4,687	−0.8%

Year	Pop.	±%
1921	5,271	+12.5%
1931	4,957	−6.0%
1936	4,947	−0.2%
1951	5,363	+8.4%
1961	5,681	+5.9%

Year	Pop.	±%
1971	6,044	+6.4%
1981	6,930	+14.7%
1991	8,276	+19.4%
2001	9,193	+11.1%

Source: Data from ISTAT
