= Salvatore Lo Piccolo =

Italian crime boss (born 1942)

- Born: 20 July 1942 (age 84); Palermo, Sicily, Italy
- Occupation: Mafia boss
- Status: Imprisoned since 2007
- Allegiance: San Lorenzo Mafia family / Sicilian Mafia
- Convictions: Mafia association Multiple murder
- Criminal charges: Mafia association Multiple murder
- Penalty: Life imprisonment

Salvatore Lo Piccolo (Italian pronunciation: [salvaˈtoːre lo ˈpikkolo]; born 20 July 1942), also known as "the Baron" (il Barone), is an Italian mafioso and one of the most powerful bosses of Palermo, Sicily, Italy. Lo Piccolo rose through the ranks of the Palermo mafia throughout the 1980s and became the capomandamento of the San Lorenzo district in 1993, replacing Salvatore Biondino, who was sent to prison. Lo Piccolo had been a fugitive since 1983 and had been running his Mafia affairs in hiding. With the capture of Bernardo Provenzano on 11 April 2006, Lo Piccolo had been cementing his power and rise to the top of the Palermo Mafia until his own arrest on 5 November 2007. It is believed that his family spread across Europe due to rising tensions, settling in England, Portugal, and southern Spain.

Lo Piccolo is also known as "u vascù"; Italian: il vecchio). In clandestine correspondence with former mafia boss Bernardo Provenzano, Lo Piccolo used to identify himself by the number 30. Lo Piccolo's fortune came from the international cocaine trafficking, the extortion of businesses, and the theft of money allocated for public works projects. He invested much of his earnings in real estate. Lo Piccolo long supported Provenzano's policy of not directing violence toward the state and preferred arbitration as a means to settle conflict between rival mafia factions.

== Mafia background ==
A photofit of Mafia boss Salvatore Lo Piccolo was constructed in February 2007, based on the mugshot at the top of the article. The photofit did not accurately reflect the change in Lo Piccolo's appearance as became clear when he was arrested in November 2007 (see image below). Lo Piccolo was in fact betrayed because he was arrested with his son of whom police did have a recent photograph.

Lo Piccolo was born in the neighbourhood Partanna Mondello in Palermo. He was the driver of the local Mafia boss Rosario Riccobono, who was killed in the Second Mafia War. Lo Piccolo changed sides and became an ally of the Corleonesi. Bosses like Pippo Calò and Nino Rotolo pleaded to save the life of Lo Piccolo. Nearly 25 years later, Rotolo would regret his appeal when a conflict arose between the two. Rotolo was overheard on bugs installed by the police saying: "One who should have died. He was the 'godson' of Saro Riccobono and should have gone."

Having survived the Second Mafia War, Lo Piccolo gradually extended his influence in and around Palermo in the 1980s and 1990s. His influence in Palermo extended to Capaci, Isola delle Femmine, Carini, Villagrazia di Carini, Sferracavallo and Partanna-Mondello. According to Italian DIA (Direzione Investigativa Antimafia), Salvatore Lo Piccolo and his son, Sandro Lo Piccolo, were in charge of most of the urban territory of Palermo. Their area of influence encompassed the "mandamenti" of San Lorenzo, Passo di Rigano and Gangi, including the coastal area up to Cefalù, and part of the territory of Messina, including the towns of Mistretta and Tortorici. Lo Piccolo allegedly made his fortune with drug trafficking and skimming off public contracts. He forced the residents of the low-income housing projects in the ZEN area of Palermo to pay him to keep the building corridors lit. He allegedly has strong links with the American Mafia.

In March 2005, the Lo Piccolo clan was the subject of a police operation known as the "Notte di San Lorenzo". Eighty-four arrest warrants were issued. Nonetheless, Salvatore and his son Sandro Lo Piccolo remained at large.

== Successor of Provenzano? ==
After the arrest of Bernardo Provenzano on 11 April 2006, Salvatore Lo Piccolo and Matteo Messina Denaro were thought to be the new leaders of Cosa Nostra. However, the pizzini (small slips of paper used to communicate with other mafiosi to avoid phone conversations) found at Provenzano's hideout indicated that Provenzano's joint deputies in Palermo were Salvatore Lo Piccolo and Antonio Rotolo, capo mandamento of Pagliarelli, a Corleonesi loyalist in the days of Totò Riina. In a message referring to an important decision for Cosa Nostra, Provenzano told Rotolo: "It's up to you, me and Lo Piccolo to decide this thing."

Anti-Mafia prosecutor Antonio Ingroia of the Direzione distrettuale antimafia (DDA) of Palermo said that it was unlikely that there would be an all-out war over who would fill Provenzano's shoes. "Right now I don't think that's probable," he said. Of the two possible successors, Ingroia thought Lo Piccolo was the more likely heir to the Mafia throne. "He's from Palermo, and that's still the most powerful Mafia stronghold," Ingroia said.

A 'pax mafiosa' initially had settled in after Provenzano's arrest because neither Lo Piccolo nor Matteo Messina Denaro appeared to have sufficient forces to seek control of Cosa Nostra, according to the Italian news agency ANSA. Subsequent investigation revealed that Lo Piccolo and Messina Denaro had reached an accommodation and that the real threat to Lo Piccolo came from Rotolo who was arrested in June 2006.

According to ANSA, "police were concerned by a couple of top-level hits they feared might spark a full-blown war of succession. Police said Lo Piccolo had the upper hand because he had been Provenzano's right-hand man in Palermo and his greater experience won him the respect of the older generation of bosses as they pursued Provenzano's policy of keeping as low as possible while strengthening their power network. These bosses had been reined in by Provenzano when he put an end to the Riina-driven war against the state that claimed the lives of Mafia crusaders Giovanni Falcone and Paolo Borsellino in 1992."

== Clash with other mafiosi ==
The ensuing power struggle, following Provenzano's arrest, led not only to increased violence in Sicily but also to likely renewed cooperation between the Sicilian mafia and the US-based Gambino crime family. Their growing relationship may open new possibilities for the Sicilian Mafia to launder money through US institutions.

On 20 June 2006, two months after Provenzano's arrest, authorities issued 52 arrest warrants against the top echelon of Cosa Nostra in the city of Palermo (Operation Gotha). Among the arrestees were Antonio Rotolo and his right-hand men Antonino Cinà (who had been the personal physician of Salvatore Riina and Provenzano) and the builder Francesco Bonura, as well as Gerlando Alberti, the ageing pioneer of heroin refineries. The investigations showed that Rotolo had built a kind of federation within the Mafia, comprising 13 families grouped in four clans. The city of Palermo was ruled by this triumvirate, replacing the Palermo's Mafia Commission whose members are all in jail.

The investigation also indicated that the position of Salvatore Lo Piccolo was not undisputed. A clash between Lo Piccolo and Rotolo had been developing over a request from the Inzerillo family to be allowed to return to Palermo. The Inzerillo family had been one of the clans whose leaders – among them Salvatore Inzerillo – were killed by the Corleonesi during the second Mafia War in the 1980s and which had been in exile in the United States. Rotolo was opposed to Lo Piccolo's permission for the return of the Inzerillo's, fearing revenge because Rotolo had strangled Santo Inzerillo, boss Salvatore's brother.

With the arrest of Rotolo and others, authorities claim they avoided the outbreak of a genuine war inside Cosa Nostra. Rotolo had passed a death sentence on Lo Piccolo and his son, Sandro, even before Provenzano's arrest – and had procured the barrels of acid that are used to dissolve the bodies of slain rivals. According to some observers, the arrest of the loyal Corleonesi triumvirate Rotolo, Cinà and Bonura, has given Lo Piccolo a free rein in Palermo.

== Rising tensions ==
In August 2006, two hitmen gunned down 63-year-old Giuseppe D'Angelo in broad daylight in the Palermo district of Tommaso Natale. The crime may have been a provocation by a rival mafia faction against Lo Piccolo, and concerns about a renewal of violence between competing mafia groups were mounting. In September 2006, Bartolomeo Spatola, the 72-year-old boss of the Sferracavallo district of Palermo, disappeared. The press suggested Salvatore Lo Piccolo's men kidnapped and killed Spatola because he had allegedly supported Nino Rotolo's plan to murder Lo Piccolo and his son Sandro.

In March 2007, police discovered a large arsenal of weapons in the countryside outside Palermo. The weapons "were ready to be used" and opined that the current absence of violence in Palermo "did not signify that the danger of a new mafia war had been averted."

On 13 June 2007, two hitmen killed 46-year-old mafia boss Nicola Ingarao – an ally of Nino Rotolo. Italy's domestic intelligence service SISDE, warned that the murder of Ingarao possibly marked a return to Mafia violence. An Antimafia prosecutor seconded this view, stating that the murder "could be a sign of reorganization, stabilization, or potential war among gangs". Lo Piccolo allegedly ordered Ingarao's murder for two reasons: 1) Ingarao opposed the return of the Inzerillo family; and 2) the elimination of Ingarao would enable Lo Piccolo to secure control of the central Palermo district of Porta Nuova for factions not hostile to him. Gaspare Pulizzi, one of Lo Piccolo's right-hand men who later became a pentito, revealed that Lo Piccolo's son Sandro was behind the murders of Spatola and Ingarao. Both murdered bosses allied with Rotolo.

In a July 2007, hearing before the Italian Senate, the director of Italian State Police, Antonio Manganelli, warned that the chain of recent murders in Palermo was in part due to the return of the "so-called fugitives (Inzerillo family)... who have now returned... If they are back, it means that someone has authorized their return. This is not appreciated by the other side," he added.

== Arrest ==
On 5 November 2007, Lo Piccolo and his son Sandro, as well as two other top mafiosi, Gaspare Pulizzi and Andrea Adamo, were arrested in a villa in Giardinello, between Cinisi and Terrasini. Police fired several warning shots in the air as they moved in against the mafiosi, who were all armed but apparently did not put up a fight. Sandro Lo Piccolo, in tears, shouted "I love you dad!" several times as he was being handcuffed. The four were put into a police helicopter and flown towards Palermo's main police station. The operation was made possible by information provided by Francesco Franzese, who was arrested on 2 August 2007, and who masterminded the Lo Piccolo clan's protection racket. His family has been moved to a secret hideout to prevent reprisals.

Officers remarked that Lo Piccolo's face was entirely different from the photofit creation. Lo Piccolo did not say a word and just smiled when prosecutors noted that he did not resemble the photofit released earlier that year. The elder Lo Piccolo was in fact betrayed by his son of whom police did have a recent photograph.

At the hideout of Lo Piccolo, a code of behaviour for Mafia members was found. The so-called "Ten Commandments" include prohibitions such as frequenting bars and looking at friends' wives, while members are urged to treat their own wives with respect. The Mafia Decalogue has been drawn up as a "guide to being a good mafioso". Other activities apparently beyond the pale for Mafiosi are being friends with the police, being late for appointments and "appropriating money if it belongs to other Mafia members or to other families".

When father and son Lo Piccolo – incarcerated under the strict 41-bis prison regime in the Opera prison in Milan – appeared on a video screen at the trial in Palermo against some of their henchmen, they rose to their feet as a sign of respect for the arrested bosses.

Lo Piccolo's other son Calogero Lo Piccolo succeeded his father and his brother, according to several pentiti. However, he was arrested on 16 January 2008, during Operation Addio Pizzo against Lo Piccolo's operators who were in charge of collecting the pizzo – protection money from local businesses – in Palermo.
