= Pizzino =

Italian word

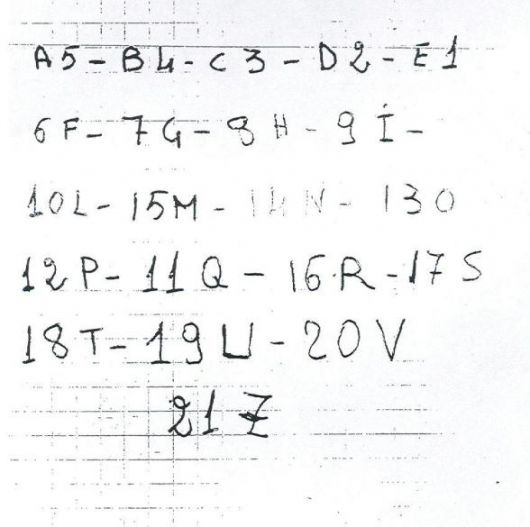
Pizzino by Bernardo Provenzano

Pizzino (Italian pronunciation: [pitˈtsiːno]; plural as pizzini) is an Italian language word derived from the Sicilian language equivalent pizzinu meaning "small piece of paper". The word has been widely used to refer to small slips of paper that the Sicilian Mafia uses for high-level communications.

Sicilian Mafia boss Bernardo Provenzano is among the best known for using pizzini, most notably in his instruction that Matteo Messina Denaro become his successor. The pizzini of other mafiosi have significantly aided police investigations.

== Provenzano case ==
Provenzano used a version of the Caesar cipher, used by Julius Caesar in wartime communications. The Caesar code involves shifting each letter of the alphabet forward three places; Provenzano's pizzini code did the same, then replaced letters with numbers indicating their position in the alphabet.

For example, one reported note by Provenzano read "I met 512151522 191212154 and we agreed that we will see each other after the holidays...". This name was decoded as "Binnu Riina".
