= Partinico =

- Comune
- Comune di Partinico
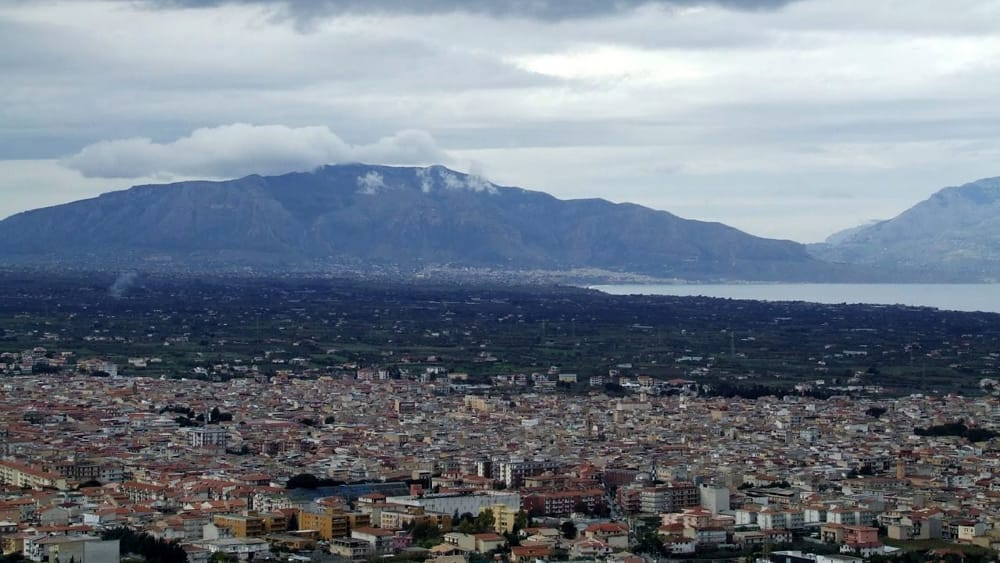
- View of Partinico

- Location within Italy Location within Sicily
- Coordinates: 38°02′42″N 13°07′15″E
- Country: Italy
- Region: Sicily
- Metropolitan city: Palermo (PA)
- Frazioni: Parrini

Government
  - Mayor: Maurizio Agnese (Special commissioner)

Area
  - Total: 108.06 km^{2} (41.72 sq mi)
- Elevation: 175 m (574 ft)

Population (1-1-2017)
  - Total: 31,847
  - Density: 294.72/km^{2} (763.31/sq mi)
- Demonym: Partinicese(i) or Partinicota(i)
- Time zone: UTC+1 (CET)
  - Summer (DST): UTC+2 (CEST)
- Postal code: 90047
- Dialing code: 091
- Patron saint: St. Leonard of Noblac
- Saint day: November 6
- Website: Official website

Partinico (Sicilian: Partinicu, Ancient Greek: Parthenikòn, Παρθενικόν) is a town and comune in the Metropolitan City of Palermo, Sicily, southern Italy. It is 30 kilometres (19 mi) from Palermo and 71 kilometres (44 mi) from Trapani.

== Main sights ==
- Church of San Giuseppe, housing 17th-century paintings
- Neo-Classicist Chiosco della Musica
- Baroque fountain

== Notable people and places ==
The father of American musician Frank Zappa was born in Partinico. The street Via Zammatà where the Zappa family once lived, was later renamed to Via Frank Zappa. In 2015 Zappa's son Dweezil released an album titled Via Zammata'.

The Italian prime minister Vittorio Emanuele Orlando represented Partinico in the Italian Parliament from 1897 until 1925.

Danilo Dolci was an Italian social activist, sociologist, popular educator and poet, and for some time resident at Partinico.

The local, family-run, anti-Mafia television station Telejato is based in the town. It is owned by Pino Maniaci.

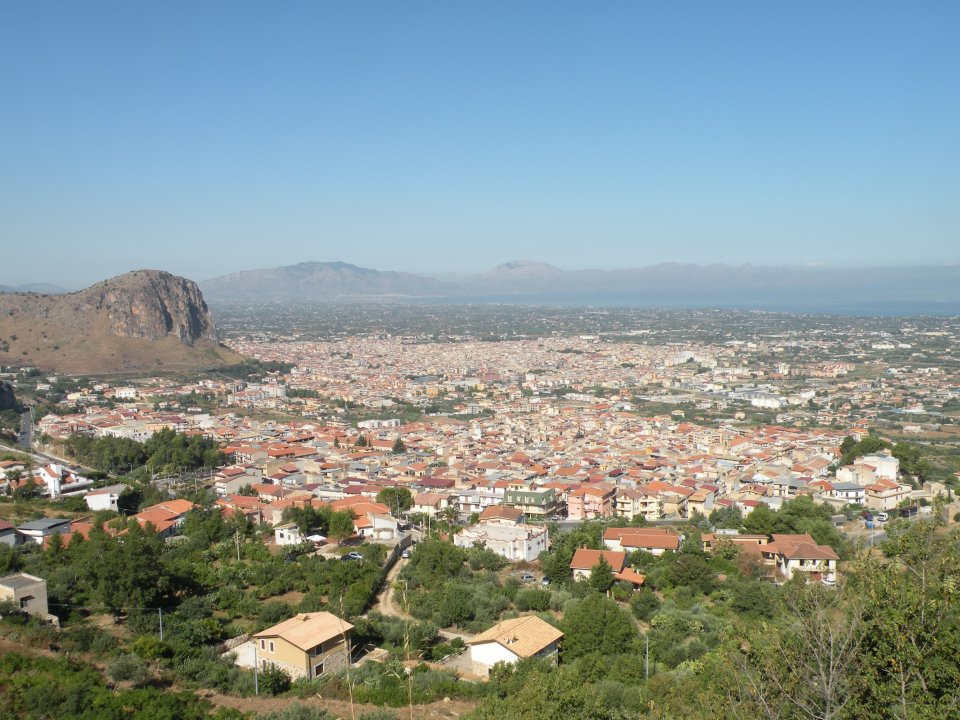
Partinico in the center of the photo with Borgetto in the foreground

== See also ==
- Sanctuary of Madonna del Ponte

== Gallery ==
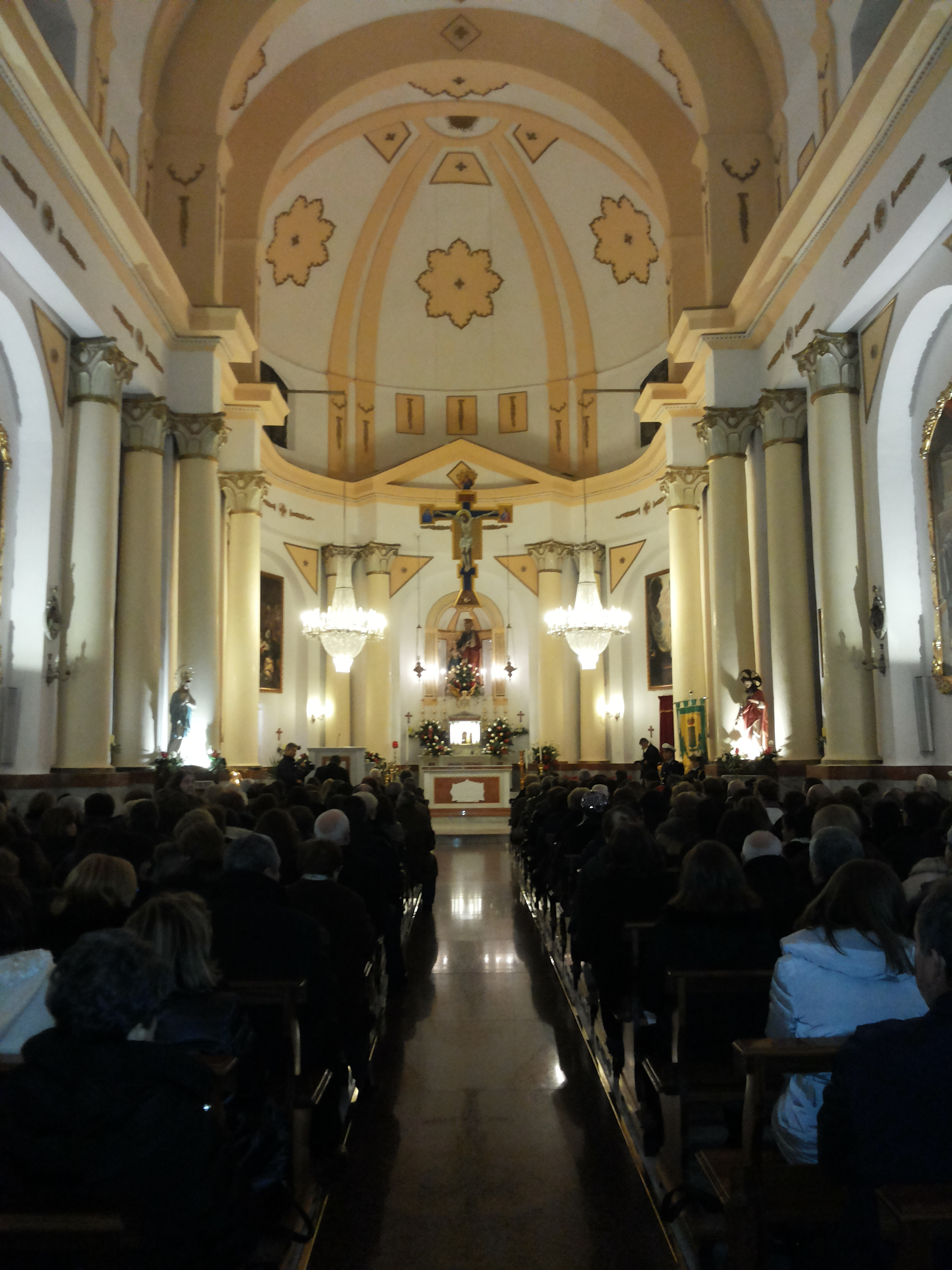
The church of St Joachim

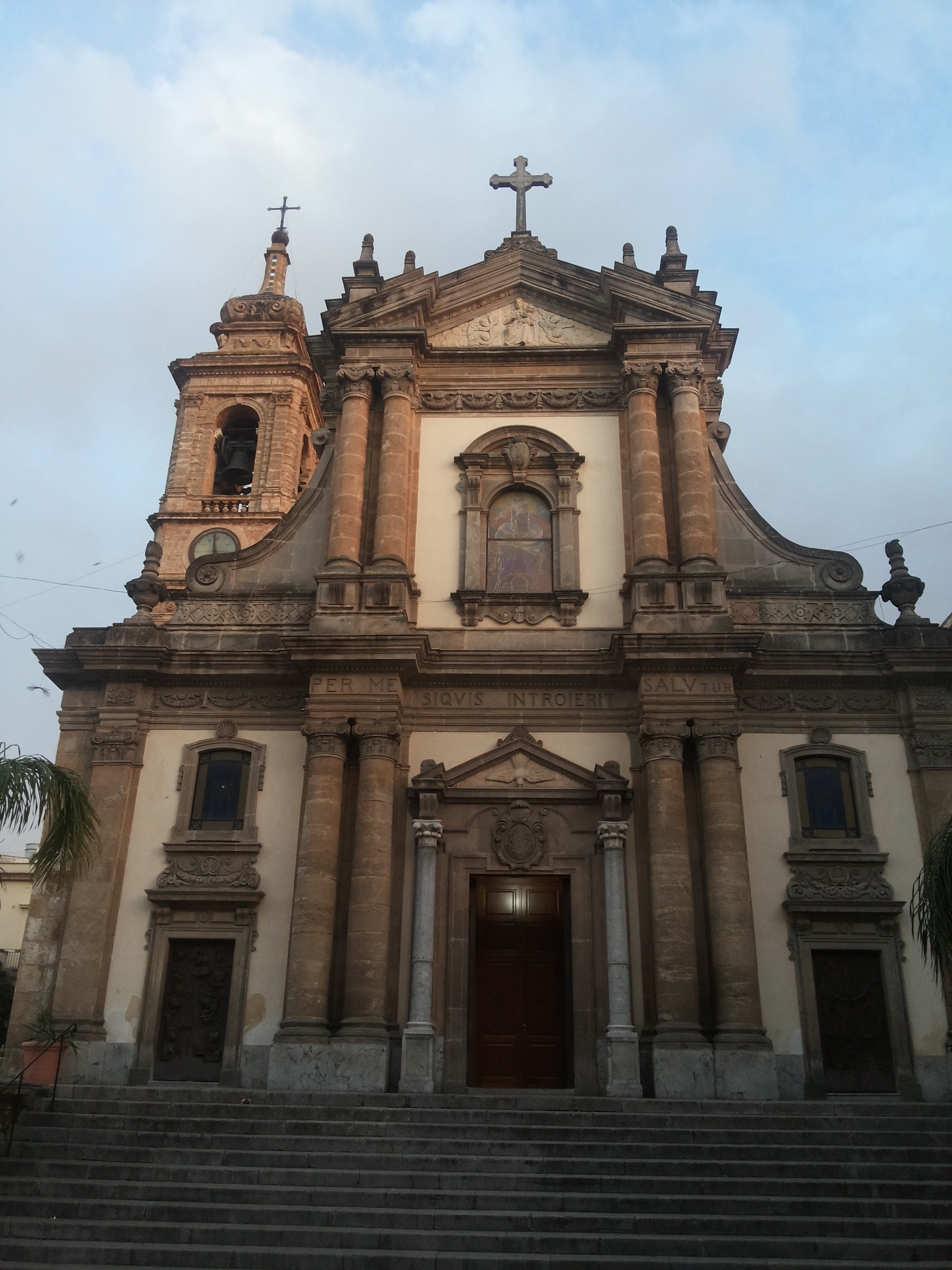
The church of the Annunciation
