= Brindisi school bombing =

2012 bombing of Morvillo Falcone High School in Brindisi, Apulia, Italy

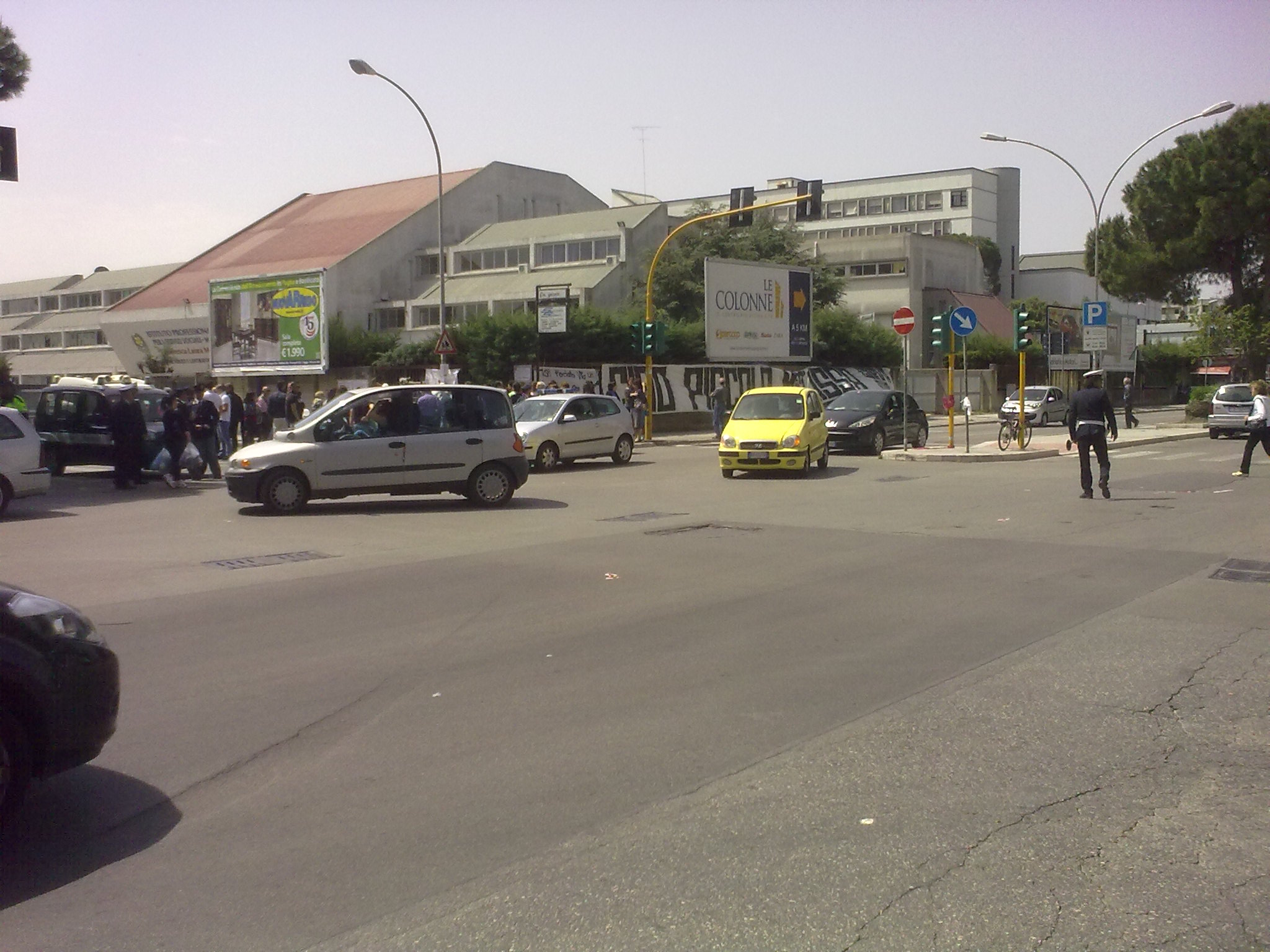
- The Morvillo Falcone high school, two days after the bombing.
- Location: 40.6243822°N 17.9293272°E; Brindisi, Apulia, Italy
- Date: Saturday, 19 May 2012; 7:45 a.m. (Central European Summer Time)
- Target: Morvillo Falcone high school
- Attack type: School bombing, murder
- Weapon: Three gas cylinder bombs
- Deaths: 1
- Injuries: 5
- Perpetrator: Giovanni Vantaggiato

The Brindisi school bombing occurred on 19 May 2012, when three gas cylinder bombs hidden in a large rubbish bin exploded in front of the Morvillo Falcone high school in Brindisi, Italy, killing a 16-year-old female student and injuring five others, one seriously.

== Explosion ==
The attack took place in Brindisi, Apulia, on the morning of Saturday, 19 May 2012, when at 7:45 a.m. local time three gas cylinder bombs detonated inside a rubbish bin close to the entrance gate in front of the Morvillo Falcone high school as students were arriving and milling outside. A bus had just unloaded more students. The cylinders, which were tied together, exploded beside 16-year-old fashion student Melissa Bassi, who took the full force of the powerful blast wave and suffered "horrific injuries", which included burns on 90 percent of her body and the loss of an arm. She died shortly afterwards in hospital.

Another sixteen-year-old student, Veronica Capodieci, was seriously wounded with grave chest and abdominal injuries. Four other students, including the older sister of Veronica, were injured and badly burned; one girl risked losing both legs. Fellow students immediately rushed to help the victims before the ambulances and police arrived. The injured students lay on the ground with their hair and clothing burnt, the school wall near the blast's epicentre showed extensive scorching, and the street was littered with books, papers and knapsacks. Glass from shattered windows also covered the pavement.

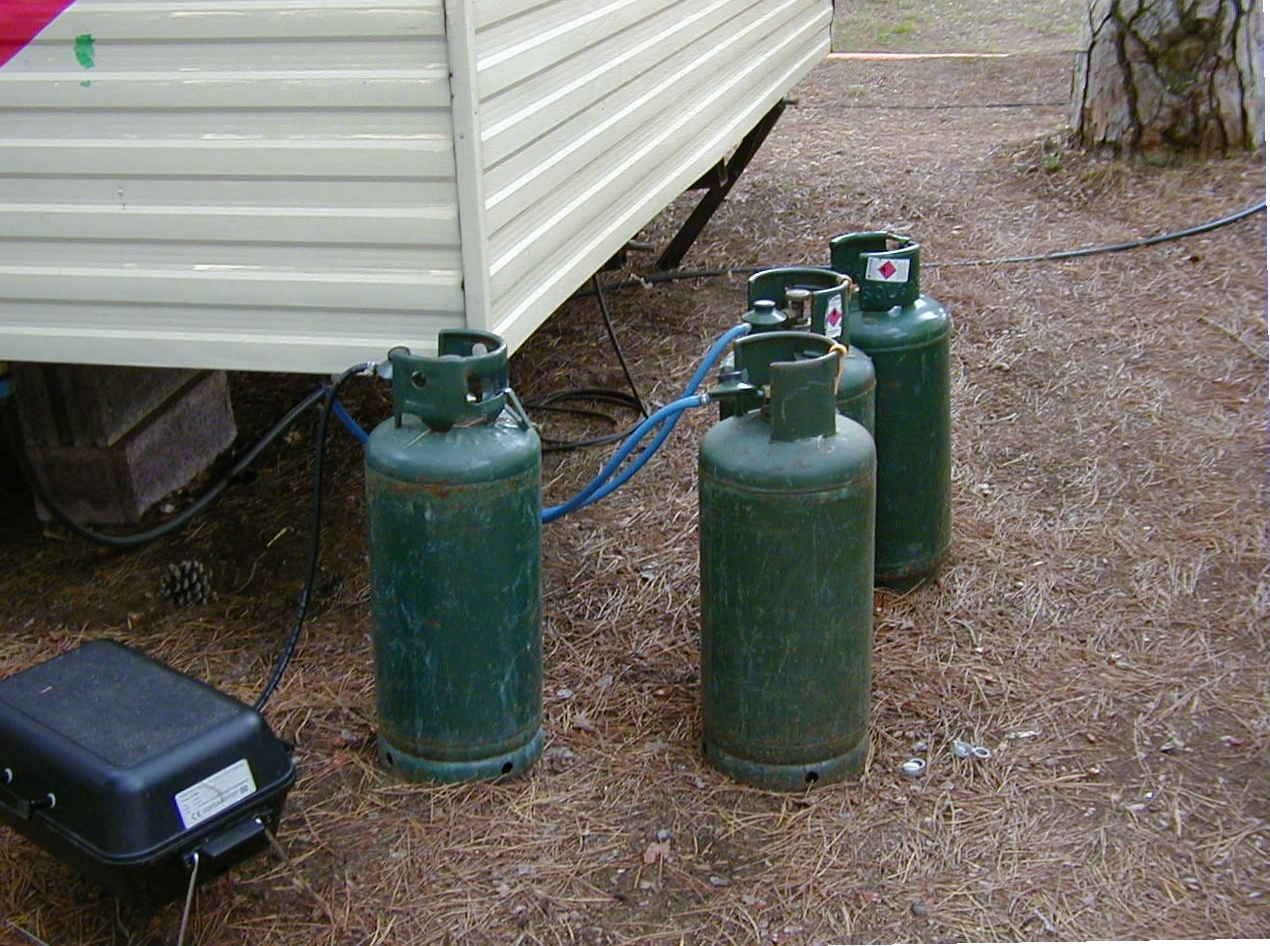
Three gas cylinders like these pictured here were used as bombs

A woman who was caught up in the explosion described having seen "a girl lying on the ground and another one who got up and started shouting". Another witness who worked in the building adjacent to the school stated succinctly his impressions of the bombing: "I was opening the window and the blast wave hit me. I saw kids on the ground. All blackened. Their books on fire. It was terrifying."

=== Reactions ===
Because the bombing had targeted a school and students, there was an instant outpouring of anger and revulsion for the attack from people all over Italy. In all major Italian cities thousands of people held emotional demonstrations against the bombing and rising social tensions brought about by the economic crisis.

Italian Prime Minister Mario Monti, who was out of the country at the time attending a G8 summit held in Camp David, condemned the attack as "cowardly" and "without precedent". French president François Hollande was also present at the summit. He expressed France's "deep solidarity" with the Italian nation. Pope Benedict XVI called the attack "despicable".

Three days of national mourning were declared and the Italian flag was flown at half-mast throughout the country. Crowds of locals went to the high school to pay their respects by laying flowers at the bomb site. The school's head teacher Angelo Rampino made the following angry statements, "It is the first time in Italy that a school has been attacked. The entire country must rise up. We cannot accept this". On the evening of the bombing, presenter Maria De Filippi dedicated the finale of the 11th edition of her televised talent show Amici di Maria De Filippi to the memory of Melissa Bassi.

=== Aftermath ===
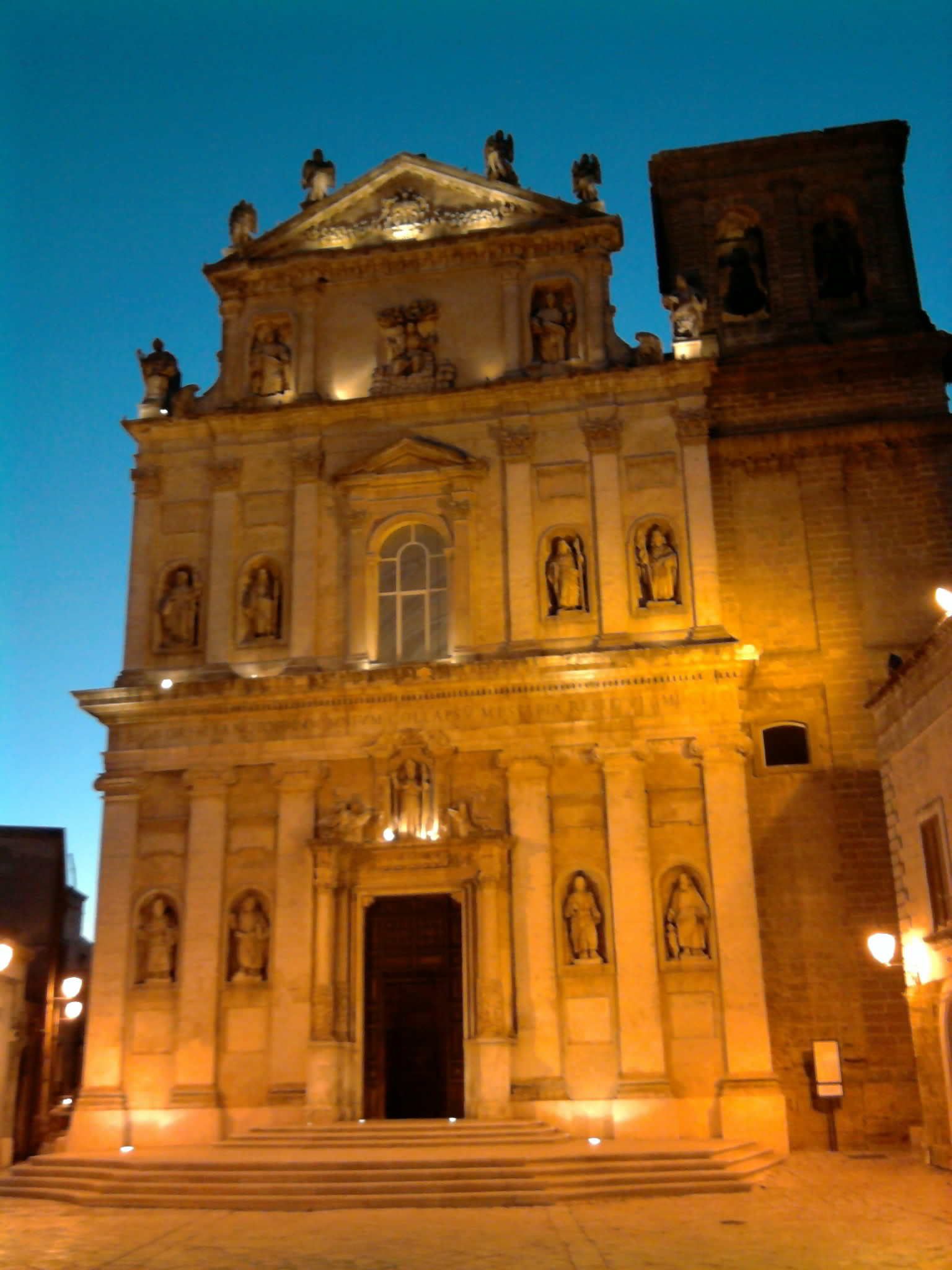
Chiesa Madre di Mesagne, where victim Melissa Bassi's state funeral was held

On Monday, 21 May 2012, victim Melissa Bassi was given a state funeral. It was held at the 17th-century church the Chiesa Madre di Mesagne in Mesagne, the comune where she lived. It was broadcast live on Raidue. Leading politicians, government ministers, and local dignitaries were in attendance, including Prime Minister Monti and President of the Italian Chamber of Deputies, Gianfranco Fini.

== Mafia connection ==
First suspect lead to organized crime and state-mafia pact: local mafia groups were involved. A few weeks before, a bomb damaged an anti-racket officer, and subsequent police raids led to the arrest of 16 mafia members. Also, the school is named after prosecuting magistrate Francesca Morvillo (Giovanni Falcone's wife), victim of mafia murdered in a massive terrorist bombing, and the Brindisi bomb took place just five days before the 20th anniversary of Capaci bombing, and an anti-mafia march was scheduled in Brindisi the same day.

== Arrests and prison ==
Within 24 hours after the attack, police arrested two men suspected of carrying out the bombing. They were taken in for questioning after police examined the film taken from nearby security cameras. The footage revealed a well-dressed, middle-aged man activating a remote control that detonated the bomb just after the bus unloaded students. One of the suspects was a man aged between 50 and 55 with a military background and "knowledge of electronics". Both men were subsequently released after police determined that they had no connection to the bombing.

Further investigations moved from organized crime, due to lack of tangible evidences. In June 2013 Giovanni Vantaggiato, who admitted to have managed the bombing for personal reasons, was sentenced to life in prison for the crime.

== See also ==
- Terrorism in the European Union
