= Cesare Bocci =

Italian actor (born 1957)

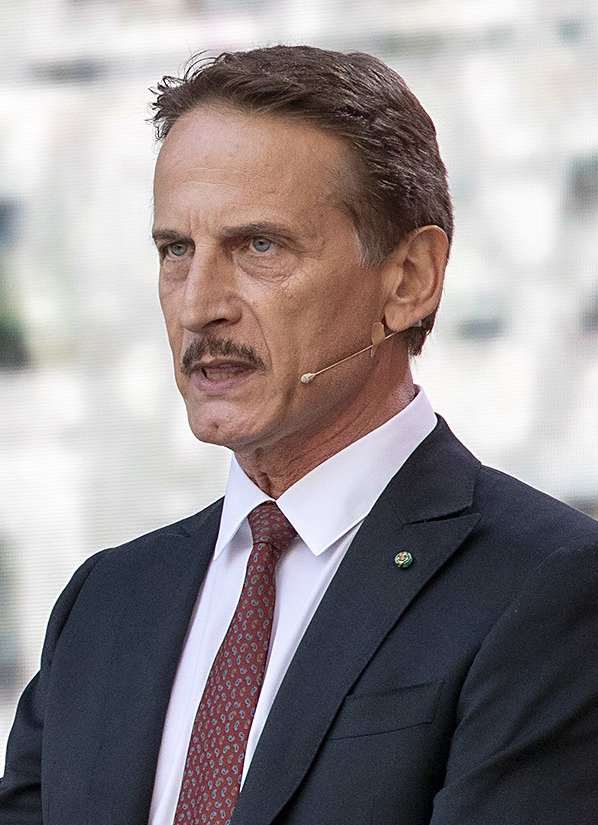
Cesare Bocci in 2021

Cesare Adolfo Bocci (born 13 September 1957) is an Italian actor. Born in Camerino, he has acted in films and on stage, but is best known for his performance as Mimi Augello to Luca Zingaretti's Salvo Montalbano in the television series Il Commissario Montalbano.

He attended acting school in his home town of Camporotondo di Fiastrone, where he was a founding member of Compagnia della Rancia of Tolentino, which produced theatre plays.

Moving to Rome, he has had continued success across theatre, cinema and television. He made his cinema debut in 1990, in Silvio Soldini's L'aria serena dell'ovest. After success in Il Commissario Montalbano, he played the role of Dr Antonio Strains in the first two seasons of Elisa di Rivombrosa. In 2007, he starred in the TV mini series Io e Mamma, and in 2008 played Sergio Danieli in Terapia d'urgenza.

In the theatre, during 2006 and 2007, he played the role of Oscar in the Italian version of Sweet Charity, alongside Lorella Cuccarini. In 2008, in Camerino, he played in the re-enactment of Corsa ala spada e Palio as the Duke Da Varano. In 2011/2 he starred in Massimo Romeo Piparo's adaptation of the famous Broadway musical adaptation of the French play La Cage Aux Folles.

In 2012, he debuted as a television presenter on Rai 3 show Il giallo e il nero. In October 2013, he was lead presenter of Miss Italia together with Massimo Ghini and Francesca Chillemi.

== Filmography ==
=== Film ===
Year	Title	Role(s)	Notes
1990	The Peaceful Air of the West	Cesare's friend	Cameo appearance
1991	The Invisible Wall	Journalist	Uncredited
1993	Condannato a nozze	Giulio	
1993	Giovanni Falcone	TV Reporter	Uncredited
1994	Aquero	Father Gabriele	
1994	De Generazione	Dan	Segment: "Just Another Vampire Story"
1997	Un giorno fortunato	Federico	
1999	See You	Ferrari	
2000	Almost Blue	Judge	Cameo appearance
2001	Princesa	Gianni	
2004	Comunque mia	Marco	
2004	Io che amo solo te	Pietro	
2004	Christmas in Love	Fausto Perla	
2004	Il servo ungherese	Dailerman's son	
2005	Non aver paura	Angelo	
2011	Rewind	Folco	
2013	Il sorriso di Candida	Corifeo	Short film
2013	Welcome Mr. President	Lega-Nord leader	
2014	Do You See Me?	Mr. Volponi	
2019	Welcome Back Mr. President	Lega-Nord leader	
2019	Il giovane Pertini: Combattente per la libertà	Adriano Olivetti	
2023	Terezín	Rafael Schächter	
2023	La quattordicesima domenica del tempo ordinario	Marzio's father	

=== Television ===
Year	Title	Role(s)	Notes
1988	Zanzibar	Benny	Main role; 40 episodes
1991	Classe di ferro	Oreste Buttafuoco	Episode: "La voce misteriosa"
1992	Scoop	Man driving Porsche	Episode: "Segreto professionale"
1994	L'ispettore Sarti	Sante Clodetti	Episode: "Il patto"
1999	Meglio tardi che mai	Giorgio Di Carlo	Television film
1999–present	Inspector Montalbano	Inspector Domenico "Mimi" Augello	Main role; 37 episodes
2000	Un medico in famiglia	Martini's cousin	Episode: "L'appartamento"
2000	Tequila & Bonetti	Roberto Melidoni	Main role; 22 episodes
2000	Gioco a incastro	Andrea	Television film
2002	Commesse	Gianni	Episode: "Compleanno di Fiorenza"
2002–2003	Il bello delle donne	Dario di Balsano	Recurring role; 7 episodes
2003–2005	Elisa di Rivombrosa	Dr. Antonio Ceppi	Recurring role; 5 episodes
2004	Amanti e Segreti	Max Leonardi	2 episodes
2005	L'amore non basta	Luca	Television film
2005	Il Cuore nel Pozzo	Giorgio	Television film
2006	L'ispettore Coliandro	Attorney Giancarlo Malerba	Episode: "Il giorno del lupo"
2006	Fratelli	Tommaso	Television film
2006	Giovanni Falcone: L'uomo che sfidò cosa nostra	Emanuele Basile	Television film
2007	Io e mamma	Alessandro Storos	Main role; 6 episodes
2007	Caccia segreta	Matteo	Television film
2008–2009	Terapia d'urgenza	Dr. Sergio Danieli	Main role; 18 episodes
2009	Restless Heart: The Confessions of Saint Augustine	Romanianus	Television film
2010	Pius XII: Under the Roman Sky	Pope Paul VI	Television film
2012	Provaci ancora prof!	Marco Visconti De Matteis	Main role (season 4); 6 episodes
2013	Volare: La grande storia di Domenico Modugno	Raimondo Lanza di Trabia	Television film
2013–2015	Una grande famiglia	Leonardo Fabbri	Main role (seasons 2–3); 15 episodes
2014	Un'altra vita	Pietro Guarnieri	Main role; 5 episodes
2016	Hundred to Go	Uomo senza doppio	2 episodes
2017	L'isola di Pietro	Giovanni Pavani	Episode: "Primo episodio"
2017	Paolo Borsellino: Adesso tocca a me	Paolo Borsellino	Television film
2018	Meraviglie: L'isola dei tesori	Cecco Angiolieri	Episode: "Episodio 1"
2018	Ballando con le Stelle	Contestant	Winner (season 13)
2019–present	Imma Tataranni: Deputy Prosecutor	Saverio Romanello	Recurring role; 12 episodes
2020–2021	Fratelli Caputo	Alberto Caputo	Lead role; 4 episodes
2021	La scelta di Maria	Luigi Gasparotto	Television film
2022	Purché finisca bene	Franco Lussurgiu	Episode: "Una scomoda eredità"
2023	Fosca Innocenti	Cesare Viani	Episode: "Il re dei profumi"
2025	Balene – Amiche per sempre	Ettore Congias	
