= Adriano Aprà =

Italian film critic (1940–2024)

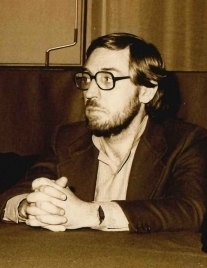
- Adriano Aprà in 1981
- Born: 18 November 1940; Rome, Italy
- Died: 15 April 2024 (aged 83); Rome, Italy
- Occupation: Film critic

Adriano Aprà (18 November 1940 – 15 April 2024) was an Italian film critic, film historian, screenwriter, director, festival curator, academic and occasional actor.

== Life and career ==
Born in Rome, Aprà graduated in law at Sapienza University, and made his debut as a film critic in 1960, collaborating with Edoardo Bruno's journal Filmcritica. In 1966, he founded the magazine Cinema & film which he directed until 1970. He served as director of the Salso Film & TV Festival between 1977 and 1989 and of the Pesaro International Film Festival between 1990 and 1998, and was president of the Cineteca Nazionale between 1998 and 2002. He also collaborated with the Venice Film Festival, curating the 1981 retrospective dedicated to Howard Hawks.

In 1970, Aprà founded the Filmstudio film society and directed his first film, Olimpia agli amici, which entered the Locarno Film Festival. He wrote the screenplay of Fiorella Infascelli's The Mask, and was actor in films directed by Bernardo Bertolucci, Marco Ferreri, Mario Schifano, Francesca Archibugi, Jean-Marie Straub and Danièle Huillet. Between 2002 and 2008 he was professor of history and critic of cinema at the University of Rome Tor Vergata.

Aprà died on 15 April 2024, at the age of 83.

== Writings ==
- New American cinema. Il cinema indipendente americano degli anni Sessanta. Ubulibri, 1986. ISBN 9788877480989.
- Rosselliniana: bibliografia internazionale: dossier Paisà. University of Michigan, 1987.
- Poetiche delle nouvelles vagues: Without special title. Marsilio, 1989.
- Viaggio in Italia. Gli anni 60 al cinema. Carte segrete, 1991. ISBN 9788885203082.
- Il Cinema sudcoreano. Marsilio, 1992. ISBN 9788831756983.
- Moravia al / nel cinema. Associazione Fondo Alberto Moravia, 1993.
- Per non morire hollywoodiani. Notizie dal cinema di fine millennio. Reset, 1999. ISBN 9788887591002.
- Ermanno Olmi. Il cinema, i film, la televisione, la scuola. Marsilio, 2003. ISBN 9788831782890.
- Marco Bellocchio. Il cinema e i film. Marsilio, 2005. ISBN 9788831787000.
- Stelle e strisce. Viaggi nel cinema USA dal muto agli anni '60. Falsopiano, 2005. ISBN 9788887011777.
- In viaggio con Rossellini. Falsopiano, 2006. ISBN 9788887011760.
- Luigi Comencini. Il cinema e i film. Marsilio, 2007. ISBN 9788831792646.
- Alberto Lattuada. Il cinema e i film. Marsilio, 2009. ISBN 9788831797771.
- Bernardo Bertolucci. Il cinema e i film. Marsilio, 2011. ISBN 9788831709651.
- Breve ma veridica storia del documentario. Dal cinema del reale alla nonfiction. Edizioni Falsopiano, 2017. ISBN 9788893041041.
- Fuorinorma. La via neosperimentale del cinema italiano. Marsilio, 2019. ISBN 9781909088337.
