= Massimo Popolizio =

Italian actor (born 1961)

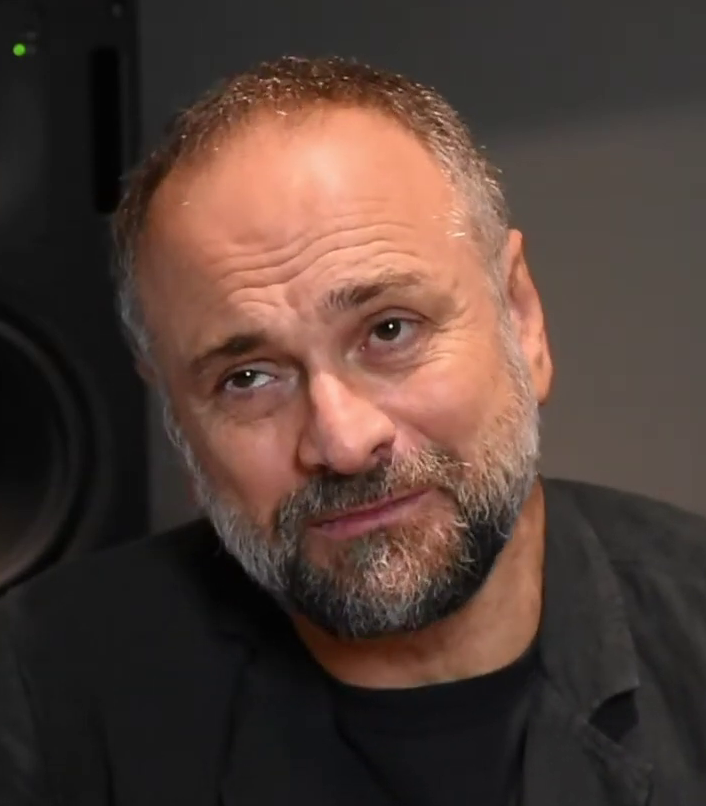
- Popolizio in 2017
- Born: 4 July 1961 (age 65); Genoa, Italy
- Occupations: Actor; voice actor
- Years active: 1983–present

Massimo Popolizio (born 4 July 1961) is an Italian actor and voice actor.

== Biography ==
Massimo Popolizio studied at the Silvio D'Amico National Academy of Dramatic Arts in Rome in 1984, Popolizio started his career as a stage actor and, after graduation, started a fruitful artistic collaboration with theater director Luca Ronconi. In 1995 he won a UBU Award as Best Actor for his work in Shakespeare's King Lear and Towards Peer Gynt inspired by Peer Gynt by Henrik Ibsen, and again in 2001 for his role in Carlo Goldoni's 1747 play The Venetian Twins. In 2006 he won the Golden Aeschylus, conferred by the National Classic Drama Institute (INDA). In 2012, Popolizio returned to Ibsen in the title role of the stage work John Gabriel Borkman, with Lucrezia Lante della Rovere and Manuela Mandracchia. In 2013 he played Don Palma in the TV show Una grande famiglia.

Popolizio lent his voice for the Italian dubbing of Lord Voldemort in the Harry Potter films, to Tom Cruise (Dr. William "Bill" Harford) in Eyes Wide Shut and to the voice of Lionel Abelanski (Shlomo) in Train of Life. He acquired visibility with his more recent film roles in Crime Novel, Black Sea and My Brother Is an Only Child, as well as in the role of Victor Sbardella in Il Divo by Paolo Sorrentino. In 1998 he won the Nastro d'Argento for Best Dubbing for the dubbing of the title character of the film Hamlet, played by director Kenneth Branagh. In 1998 he voiced Tim Roth in the role of Danny Boodman TD Lemon 1900 in the film The Legend of 1900. In 2009 he was the Italian voice of actor Cal Lightman, the protagonist of the series Lie to Me (also played by Tim Roth). In 2013, he returned to the cinema with Welcome Mr. President and The Great Beauty.

== Filmography ==
=== Film ===
Year	Title	Role(s)	Notes
1993	Caccia alle mosche	Daniele	
1995	Heartless	Minister	
1996	The Elective Affinities	Marchese	
2005	Romanzo Criminale	Il Terribile	
2006	Mare nero	Laganà	
2007	My Brother Is an Only Child	Ettore Benassi	
2008	Il divo	Vittorio Sbardella	
2008	Amore che vieni, amore che vai	Bernard	
2009	The Big Dream	Domenico	
2010	20 Cigarettes	Storchi	
2010	The Santa Claus Gang	Junk Dealer	Cameo appearance
2011	Boris: The Film	Massimo	
2011	Drifters	Sergio	
2012	Steel	Arturo	
2013	Welcome Mr. President	Center-left Leader	
2013	The Great Beauty	Alfio Bracco	
2014	Amici come noi	Ettore	
2014	Leopardi	Monaldo Leopardi	
2014	The Rich, the Pauper and the Butler	Father Amerigo	
2015	Arianna	Marcello Fermi	
2016	The Big Score	Conversani	
2016	Era d'estate	Giovanni Falcone	
2018	I'm Back	Benito Mussolini	
2019	The Champion	Tito Rigoni	
2019	Welcome Back Mr. President	Former Politician	
2019	The Lion King	Scar	Italian voice
2019	Il ladro di giorni	Totò	
2019	Once Upon a Time... in Bethlehem	Herod the Great	
2020	The Predators	Pierpaolo Pavone	
2021	Governance	Renzo Petrucci	
2021	Ai confini del male	Giorgio	
2022	La notte più lunga dell'anno	Francesco	
2022	Dry	Himself	Cameo appearance
2022	War	Attilio Benedetti	
2022	Across the River and into the Trees	Vanni Rizzon	
2023	Eravamo bambini	Antonio Rizzo	

=== Television ===
Year	Title	Role(s)	Notes
1996	That Awful Mess on Via Merulana	Giuliano Valdarena	Television movie
2001	L'attentatuni	Angelo Branca	Two-parts television movie
2005	Il grande Torino	Erno Erbstein	Television movie
2007	La stagione dei delitti	Michele Mangano	6 episodes
2011	Il delitto di via Poma	Inspector Massimo Del Frate	Television movie
2013	Il clan dei camorristi	Don Palma	5 episodes
2013	Una grande famiglia	Vincenzo De Lucia	6 episodes
2014	Qualunque cosa succeda	Michele Sindona	Television movie
2016	Io non mi arrendo	Gaetano Russo	Two-parts television movie
2018	Il confine	General Cadorna	Television movie
2021	Svegliati amore mio	Ettore Tagliabue	3 episodes
2025	Sara: Woman in the Shadows	Corrado Lembo	4 episodes

== Theatre ==
- S. Giovanna, directed by Luca Ronconi (1983)
- Due Commedie in Commedia, G. B. Andreini, directed by Luca Ronconi (1984)
- Tasso, Goethe, directed by Cesare Lievi (1986)
- Il Gabbiano, Anton Cechov, directed by Massimo Castri (1987)
- Aiace, Sofocle, directed by Antonio Calenda (1988)
- La Sposa di Messina, Friedrich Schiller, directed by Elio De Capitani (1990)
- Gli Ultimi Giorni dell'Umanità, Karl Kraus, directed by Luca Ronconi (1992)
- Misura per misura, William Shakespeare, directed by Luca Ronconi (1992)
- Aminta, Torquato Tasso, directed by Luca Ronconi (1993)
- Venezia Salva, Simone Weil, directed by Luca Ronconi (1993)
- Peer Gynt, Henrik Ibsen, directed by Luca Ronconi (1995)
- Re Lear, William Shakespeare, directed by Luca Ronconi (1995)
- I Fratelli Karamazov, Fedor Dostoevskij, directed by Luca Ronconi (2001)
- I Due Gemelli Veneziani, Carlo Goldoni, directed by Luca Ronconi (2001)
- Lolita, Nabokov, directed by Luca Ronconi (2002)
- Baccanti, Euripide, directed by Luca Ronconi (2002)
- Rane, Aristofane, directed by Luca Ronconi (2002)
- Professor Bernhardi, by Arthur Schnitzler, directed by Luca Ronconi (2005)
- Cyrano de Bergerac, Rostand, directed by Daniele Abbado (2009)
- Il misantropo, Molière, directed by Massimo Castri (2010)
- Blackbird, D. Harrower, directed by Lluis Pasqual (2011)
- John Gabriel Borkman, by Ibsen, directed by Piero Maccarinelli (2012)
- Visita al padre, by Roland Schimmelpfennig, directed by Carmelo Rifici (2014)

== Dubbing ==
=== Movies ===
- Ralph Fiennes in Harry Potter and the Goblet of Fire, Harry Potter and the Order of the Phoenix, Harry Potter and the Deathly Hallows – Part 1, Harry Potter and the Deathly Hallows – Part 2
- Daniel Auteuil in Sostiene Pereira, Sade and in The Eighth Day
- Bruce Willis in Armageddon
- Tom Cruise in Eyes Wide Shut
- Tim Roth in The Legend of 1900 and Lie to Me
- Kenneth Branagh in Hamlet and Othello
- Lionel Abelanski in Train of Life
- Mark Rylance in Anonymous
- Crispin Glover in Beowulf
- Ulrich Noethen in Comedian Harmonists
- Ulrich Mühe in My Führer – The Really Truest Truth about Adolf Hitler
