= Era d'estate =

- Directed by: Fiorella Infascelli
- Written by: Fiorella Infascelli; Antonio Leotti
- Produced by: Domenico Procacci
- Starring: Giuseppe Fiorello; Massimo Popolizio
- Cinematography: Fabio Cianchetti
- Production companies: Fandango; Rai Cinema
- Distributed by: 01 Distribution
- Release date: 23 May 2016
- Running time: 100 minutes
- Country: Italy
- Language: Italian

Era d'estate (It Was in the Summer) is an Italian biographical drama film directed by Fiorella Infascelli, starring Giuseppe Fiorello and Massimo Popolizio, based on the permanence of judges Paolo Borsellino and Giovanni Falcone on the Asinara island.

== Plot ==
On 13 August 1985, judges Giovanni Falcone and Paolo Borsellino are sent, together with their families, on the Asinara island in Sardinia in order to keep them safe from Cosa Nostra, who wants to kill them after the arrest of several members of the crime organization.

Falcone and Borsellino stood on the island, isolated from the world, annoyed by the fact that they can't help with the trials and the investigations, but knowing they need to stay there for the safety of their families.

== Cast ==
- Giuseppe Fiorello as Paolo Borsellino
- Massimo Popolizio as Giovanni Falcone
- Valeria Solarino as Francesca Morvillo, Falcone's wife
- Claudia Potenza as Agnese Piraino Leto, Borsellino's wife

== Awards and nominations ==
=== David di Donatello (2017) ===
- Nomination for David di Donatello for Best Adapted Screenplay to Fiorella Infascelli and Antonio Leotti
