= Giovanni Falcone (film) =

- Directed by: Giuseppe Ferrara
- Starring: Michele Placido
- Cinematography: Claudio Cirillo
- Edited by: Ruggero Mastroianni
- Music by: Pino Donaggio
- Release date: 1993
- Country: Italy
- Language: Italian

Giovanni Falcone is a 1993 Italian biographical drama film written and directed by Giuseppe Ferrara. It is based on the real life-events of the prosecuting magistrate Giovanni Falcone who was killed by the mafia in 1992.

== Cast ==
- Michele Placido as Giovanni Falcone
- Anna Bonaiuto as Francesca Morvillo
- Giancarlo Giannini as Paolo Borsellino
- Massimo Bonetti as Ninni Cassarà
- Nello Riviè as Rocco Chinnici
- Gianni Musy as Tommaso Buscetta
- Marco Leto as Antonino Caponnetto
- Paolo De Giorgio as Calogero Zucchetto
- Antonio Cantafora as Totò Inzerillo
- Pietro Biondi as the "Dottore" (Bruno Contrada)
- Nino D'Agata as Totuccio Contorno
- Fabrizio Gifuni as Roberto Antiochia
- Gianfranco Barra as Vincenzo Geraci
- Roberto Nobile as Judge Di Pisa
- Arnaldo Ninchi as Salvo Lima
- Giampiero Bianchi as Claudio Martelli
- Giovanni Pallavicino as Vito Ciancimino
- Luigi Angelillo as Ignazio Salvo
- Francesco Bellomo as Francesco Marino Mannoia
- Ivana Monti as Marcelle Padovani
- Gaetano Amato as Luciano Liggio
