= Welcome Mr. President =

- Directed by: Riccardo Milani
- Written by: Fabio Bonifacci; Luca Miniero
- Story by: Fabio Bonifacci; Nicola Giuliano
- Produced by: Nicola Giuliano; Francesca Cima
- Starring: Claudio Bisio; Kasia Smutniak; Giuseppe Fiorello; Remo Girone; Massimo Popolizio; Cesare Bocci; Omero Antonutti; Michele Alhaique; Franco Ravera; Patrizio Rispo; Gianni Cavina; Piera Degli Esposti
- Cinematography: Saverio Guarna
- Edited by: Giogiò Franchini
- Music by: Andrea Guerra
- Distributed by: 01 Distribution
- Release date: March 21, 2013
- Running time: 98 min
- Country: Italy
- Language: Italian

Welcome Mr. President (Italian: Benvenuto Presidente!) is a 2013 Italian comedy film directed by Riccardo Milani and starring Claudio Bisio. A sequel, Welcome Back Mr. President (Bentornato Presidente!), was released in 2019.

== Plot ==
Giuseppe Garibaldi is a modest librarian in a small town in Piedmont. He loves to read, transmit culture to children (despite the library's lack of funds), and river-fish. Meanwhile, the elections of the President of the Republic are held in Rome, but political leaders cannot reach an agreement. As a result, main party leaders all choose to vote for a historical figure as a protest vote: unintentionally they all end up electing "Giuseppe Garibaldi". When the vote is confirmed the party leaders are in shock and they immediately want to nullify the vote. The only problem is that there is an eligible citizen with that same exact name, so now by law he has to become the president. The party leaders want him to resign as soon as he takes office but as Giuseppe understands the spreading corruption of Italian politics, he refuses. Once Garibaldi aka “Peppino” becomes the president, he immediately notices the cruel world of Italian politics. Giuseppe, friend of the people, begins to do many good works, earning the popular support. Meanwhile, the leaders of the political parties try to impeach him.

Giuseppe, however, makes a poignant speech to the parliament, putting all the politicians and the Italian public itself to ridicule. A few weeks later, Giuseppe is in his small village when he receives a phone call. Answering it, he finds out that the Vatican has made the same mistake as the parliament and elected him as the new Pope.

== Cast ==
- Claudio Bisio as Giuseppe 'Peppino' Garibaldi
- Kasia Smutniak as Janis Clementi
- Omero Antonutti as General Secretary Ranieri
- Remo Girone as Morelli
- Giuseppe Fiorello as Center-right leader
- Cesare Bocci as Lega Nord leader
- Massimo Popolizio as Center-left leader
- Franco Ravera as Luciano Cassetti
- Gianni Cavina as Mr. Fausto
- Michele Alhaique as Piero Garibaldi
- Patrizio Rispo as General Cavallo
- Pietro Sarubbi as President of Brazil
- Piera Degli Esposti as Janis' Mother
- Gigio Morra as Spugna
- Pupi Avati, Lina Wertmüller, Steve Della Casa and Gianni Rondolino as the powers-that-be

== See also ==
- List of Italian films of 2013
