= The Mask (1988 film) =

1988 film

- Film poster
- Directed by: Fiorella Infascelli
- Written by: Adriano Aprà; Ennio De Concini; Fiorella Infascelli; Enzo Ungari
- Produced by: Ettore Rosboch; Lilia Smecchia
- Starring: Helena Bonham Carter
- Cinematography: Acácio de Almeida
- Edited by: Francesco Malvestito
- Music by: Luis Enríquez Bacalov
- Release date: May 1988
- Running time: 90 minutes
- Country: Italy
- Language: Italian

The Mask (Italian: La maschera) is a 1988 Italian romance film directed by Fiorella Infascelli. It was screened in the Un Certain Regard section at the 1988 Cannes Film Festival.

== Cast ==
- Helena Bonham Carter as Iris
- Michael Maloney as Leonardo
- Feodor Chaliapin, Jr. as Leonardo's father
- Roberto Herlitzka as Elia
- Alberto Cracco as Viola
- Michele De Marchi as Theatre Company Manager
- Valentina Lainati as Maria
- Saskia Colombaioni as Saskia
- Arnaldo Colombaioni as Nani
- Valerio Colombaioni as Ercolino
- Walter Colombaioni as Acrobata
- Maria Tedeschi as Talia
- Massimo Fedele as Don Gaetano
