= Raffaele Pisu =

Italian actor and comedian (1925–2019)

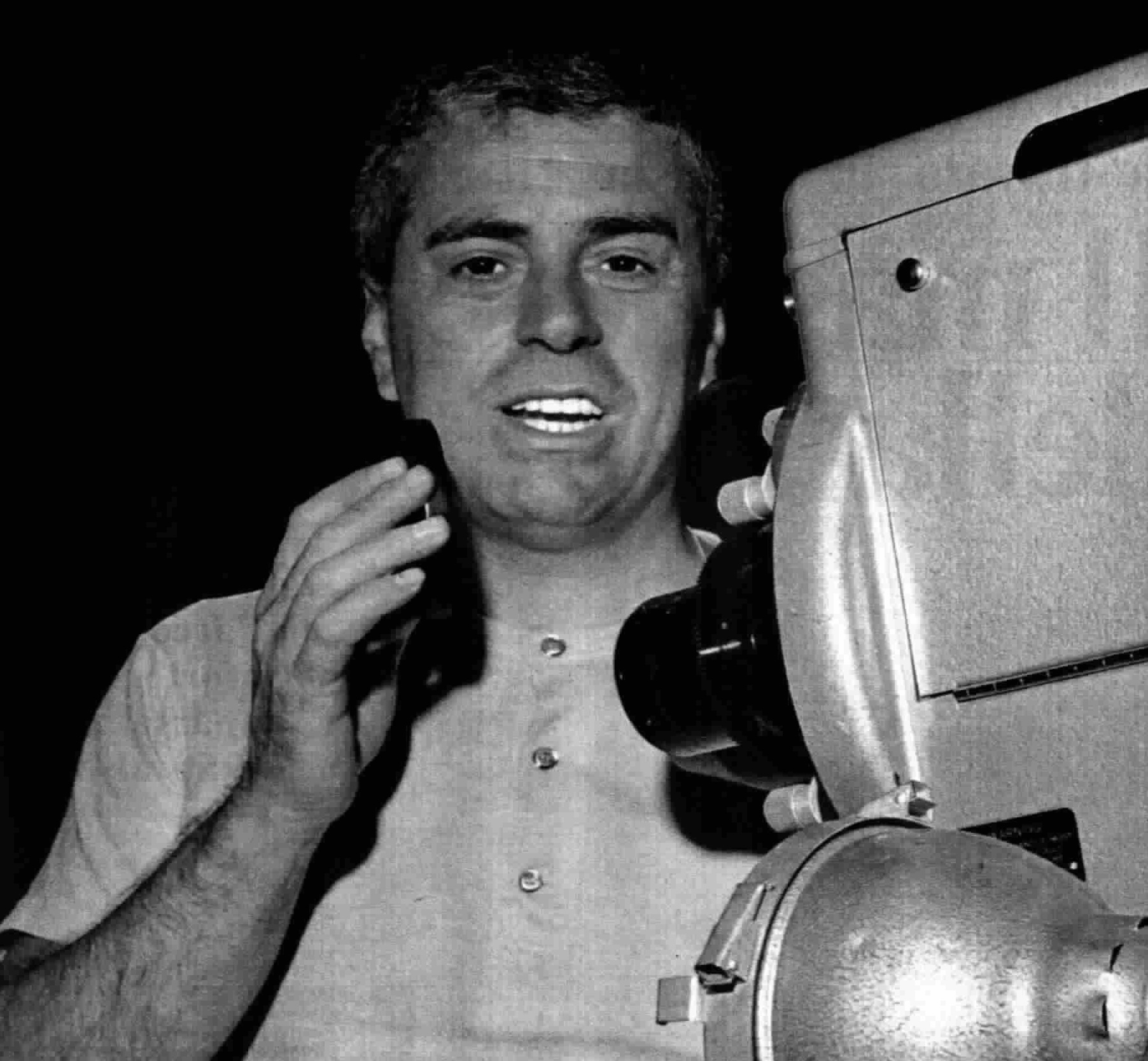
- Pisu in 1968
- Born: Guerrino Pisu; 24 May 1925; Bologna, Kingdom of Italy
- Died: 31 July 2019 (aged 94); Castel San Pietro Terme, Italy
- Occupation: Actor
- Relatives: Mario Pisu (brother)

Guerrino Pisu (24 May 1925 – 31 July 2019), known professionally as Raffaele Pisu, was an Italian actor and comedian.

== Life and career ==
Born in Bologna into a family of Sardinian origin, Pisu debuted in the drama theater and in 1945 he was one of the founders of the stage company L'attico. He later focused on the avanspettacolo, working with the Nava Sisters, Isa Barzizza and Wanda Osiris. He reached a large popularity with several variety shows on radio and later on television, notably with the variety television L'amico del giaguaro (1961–1964). Pisu was also active in TV-movies and in films, usually in supporting roles.

In 2005, Pisu won the Nastro d'Argento for best supporting actor for his performance in Paolo Sorrentino's The Consequences of Love.
