= Piera Degli Esposti =

Italian actress (1938–2021)

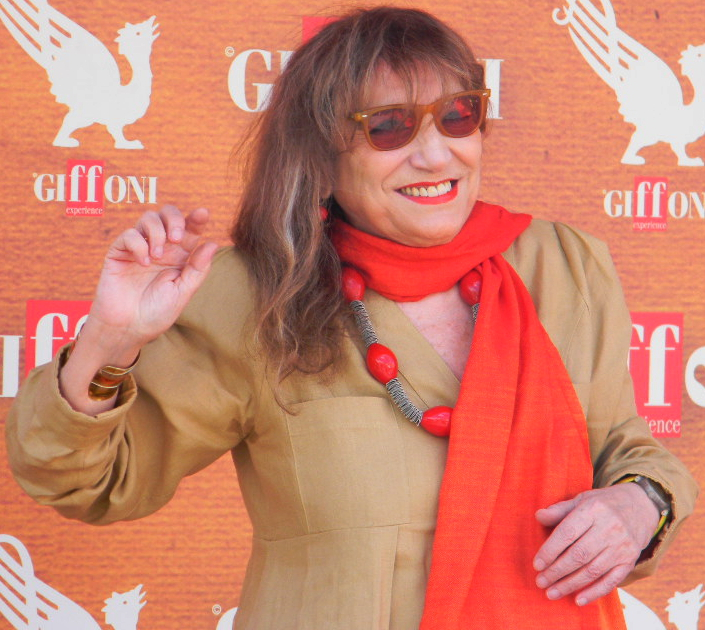
- Esposti in 2010
- Born: 12 March 1938; Bologna, Kingdom of Italy
- Died: 14 August 2021 (aged 83); Rome, Italy
- Occupation: Actress
- Years active: 1966–2021

Piera Degli Esposti (12 March 1938 – 14 August 2021) was an Italian actress. She appeared in more than 70 films and television shows from 1966 to 2020. In 2009, she won the David di Donatello for Best Supporting Actress for her role of Mrs. Enea in Il divo. Degli Esposti co-wrote Marco Ferreri's 1983 film The Story of Piera, which was based on a book-length conversation with writer Dacia Maraini about Degli Esposti's own life, childhood and coming of age experience in Post-War Italy.

== Filmography ==
=== Films ===
Year	Title	Role(s)	Notes
1967	Ghosts	A nun	Uncredited
1969	Under the Sign of Scorpio	Piera	
1969	A Nice Girl Like Me	Angelina's mother	
1969	Medea	Woman	Uncredited
1973	Hospitals: The White Mafia	Marchetti's wife	
1976	Fantasia, ma non troppo, per violino	Various roles	
1981	Sweet Dreams	Mrs. Apicella	
1982	Giocare d'azzardo	Anna	
1983	A Joke of Destiny	Mrs. De Andreis	
1986	The Malady of Love	Teresa	
1988	Don Bosco	Lina's mother	
1988	L'appassionata	Gilberta	
1996	The Blue Collar Worker and the Hairdresser in a Whirl of Sex and Politics	Palmina Gavazzi	
2002	My Mother's Smile	Aunt Maria	
2003	The Wedding Dress	Giselda	
2004	Corpo immagine	Lara Torre	Short film
2006	Lettere dalla Sicilia	Augusta Warwick	
2006	The Unknown Woman	Gina	
2006	Tre donne morali	Elisa Vallifuoco	
2008	Il divo	Vincenza Enea	
2008	The Man Who Loves	Giulia	
2009	Giulia Doesn't Date at Night	Attilia	
2009	David's Birthday	Giuliana	
2010	I bambini della sua vita	Rosaria	
2010	Parents and Children: Shake Well Before Using	Lea	
2010	Lost Kisses	Viola	
2011	Un milione di giorni	La Santa	
2012	Pulce non c'è	Grandma Carmen	
2013	Welcome Mr. President	Janis' mother	
2015	Cloro	Principal	
2015	A Holy Venetian Family	Mara Cecchin	
2015	Somewhere Amazing	Adriana	
2015	Banat	Mrs. Nitti	
2016	Solo	Dr. Grunewald	
2016	Sweet Dreams	Simone's mother	
2016	Louise by the Shore	Old Louise (voice)	Italian voice-over
2016	Ears	Newspaper director	
2017	Favola	Fairytale's mother	
2022	Corro da te	Grandma Margherita	Final film role

=== Television ===
Year	Title	Role(s)	Notes
1963	Ritorna il tenente Sheridan	Waitress	Episode: "Un testimone per uccidere"
1966	The Count of Monte Cristo	Charlotte	Main role
1967	Le troiane	Prisoner	Television film
1967	Vita di Cavour	Laundress	Episode: "Episode 1"
1968	Il circolo Pickwick	Emily Wardle	3 episodes
1969	Diritto di cronaca	Lucia Battaglia	Television film
1982	Il fascino dell'insolito	The Witch	Episode: "La tortura delle speranze"
1983	Delitto e castigo	Katjerìna	Main role
1989	The Tenth One in Hiding	Marcella	Television film
1989	The Betrothed	Perpetua	3 episodes
2004	Diritto di difesa	Silvia Malatesta	Main role
2008–2012	Tutti pazzi per amore	Clelia Arcangeli	Main role
2009	Mannaggia alla miseria	Grandma Giuditta	Television film
2011	Atelier Fontana - Le sorelle della moda	Princess Caetani	Miniseries
2012–2015	Una grande famiglia	Serafina Costantini	Main role
2017	Murders at Barlume	Piera	Episode: "Aria di mare"
2019	Ognuno è perfetto	Emma	Main role
2019	Che Dio ci aiuti	Sister Piera	2 episodes
