= Nino D'Agata =

Italian actor (1955–2021)

- Born: Antonino D'Agata; 8 October 1955; Catania, Sicily, Italy
- Died: 20 August 2021 (aged 65); Rome, Lazio, Italy
- Occupations: Actor, voice actor
- Children: Lorenzo D'Agata

Antonino "Nino" D'Agata (8 October 1955 – 20 August 2021) was an Italian film and television actor, and a voice actor in the Italian version of The Simpsons.

== Filmography ==
- Giovanni Falcone (1993)
- Rapporti impropri (1999)
- L'ultimo bacio (2001)
- Prima classe (2003)
- Le conseguenze dell'amore (2004)
- Non vi sedete troppo (2005)
- Mai dove dovremmo essere (2005)
- Nuovomondo (2006)
- Il sangue dei vinti (2008)
- Nero infinito (2013)
- La trattativa (2014)
- Il ministro (2016)
