= Fiorella Infascelli =

Italian film director

- Born: 29 October 1952 (age 73); Rome, Italy
- Occupations: Film director Screenwriter
- Years active: 1980-2003

Fiorella Infascelli (born 29 October 1952) is an Italian film director and screenwriter.

== Life and career ==
Born in Rome, Infascelli is the daughter of the producer and director Carlo. After working as an assistant director for notable directors such as Luchino Visconti, Bernardo Bertolucci and Pier Paolo Pasolini, she debuted as director in 1980 with the TV-movie Ritratto di donna distesa. Her film The Mask was screened in the Un Certain Regard section at the 1988 Cannes Film Festival.

== Filmography ==
- Ritratto di donna distesa (1980)
- Pa (1981)
- The Mask (1988)
- Zuppa di pesce (1992)
- Italiani (1998)
- Conversazione italiana (1999)
- Ferreri, I Love You (2000)
- Il vestito da sposa (2003)
- Era d'estate (2016)
