= Una grande famiglia =

Italian television series

- Also known as: A big family
- Genre: Family drama; Comedy-drama
- Created by: Ivan Cotroneo
- Developed by: Magnolia
- Written by: Ivan Cotroneo; Stefano Bises; Monica Rametta
- Directed by: Riccardo Milani; Riccardo Donna
- Creative director: Ivan Cotroneo
- Starring: Stefania Sandrelli; Gianni Cavina; Stefania Rocca; Alessandro Gassmann; Sonia Bergamasco; Giorgio Marchesi; Sarah Felberbaum; Primo Reggiani; Luca Peracino; Rosabell Laurenti Sellers; Filippo De Paulis; Lino Guanciale; Piera Degli Esposti; Rose Marie Sagne; Emmanuel Dabone; Cesare Bocci; Romano Reggiani; Irene Casagrande; Isabella Ferrari; Anna Bellezza; Giulia Cappelletti
- Country of origin: Italy
- Original language: Italian
- No. of seasons: 3
- No. of episodes: 32

Production
- Producer: Magnolia
- Production locations: Bergamo, Brianza, Como, Inverigo, Lecco, Milan, Monza, Pavia, Rome
- Running time: 102 minutes (each episode)
- Production company: RAI

Original release
- Network: Rai 1
- Release: April 15, 2012 – May 26, 2015

Una grande famiglia (English: The family) is an Italian comedy drama television series, produced by Rai Fiction and Cross Productions and broadcast in prime time on Rai 1 starting from April 15, 2012 for three seasons. It was created by Ivan Cotroneo and written by Stefano Bises, Ivan Cotroneo and Monica Rametta and directed by Riccardo Milani, former director of the first successful fiction written by Cotroneo, Tutti pazzi per amore. The plot revolves around the events of a family of Lombard industrialists, the Rengoni.

Before the second season aired, Rai released a web series Una grande famiglia - 20 anni prim, that explored events two decades before the main storyline. The third and final season began airing on April 12, 2015. This television series was the most watched of its airing channel. It was also one of the most successful series in Italy. Una grande famiglia has been translated into French, German and Polish.

== Pilot ==
The Rengoni family lives in Brianza and works in the furniture industry. The disappearance of the first of the five Rengoni brothers, Edoardo, brings to light old loves and new secrets in the lives of every member of the family, happy only in appearance. The end of the first season sees the return to the scene of Edoardo, still alive, who will also be the protagonist of the second, bringing with him the mystery that has always hovered over the reason for his fake death. The third season, set a few years after the second, is instead linked to the return of Claudia Manetti, Eleonora's biological daughter, of whose existence Edoardo had been aware for years.

== Season 1 ==
Ernesto Rengoni and his wife Eleonora (Nora) live in a villa in Inverigo and have five children. The eldest son Edoardo is married to Chiara, a woman who years earlier had had a relationship with Raoul, their other son. Edoardo and Chiara have two children: 15-year-old Valentina and 7-year-old Ernesto, known as Tino. Laura is their second child, a lawyer with a son, Nicolò, a seventeen year old who hides various problems. Ernesto and Eleonora's third son is Raoul, who has a riding school where he practices hippotherapy. He lives with Martina and has temporary foster care with her of an 8-year-old child, Salvatore (Salvo), the biological son of a drug-addicted woman. Their other daughter is Nicoletta, a doctoral student in Economics and lover of Vittorio, her professor. Ruggero Benedetti Valentini, scion of a family of industrialists, courts her vigorously, but she can't stand him. The last one, the big boy of the family, is Stefano, he is twenty-eight years old and has a special bond with Nicoletta. He lost his best friend in a car accident in which he was involved. While Ernesto's sixty-fifth birthday is being celebrated on the Rengoni estate, news arrives that the seaplane with which Edoardo intended to reach Inverigo has crashed into Lake Como. However, there is no trace of the man's body. Edoardo's disappearance mess up the Rengoni's life. His father Ernesto, forced by events to return to the factory, discovers that 20 million of euros have disappeared from the company bank accounts.

Over the course of the story, everyone will discover their weaknesses and come together to become stronger. Chiara and Raoul will become lovers, Nicoletta will begin to fall in love with Ruggero, Laura will discover her son's homosexuality and Stefano will realize that he was driving the car in which her friend died. Meanwhile, the situation in the company worsens to the point that, to avoid bankruptcy and the loss of the villa, Ernesto decides to sell the company. But the secretary Serafina informs a mysterious man with whom she is constantly in contact of the situation. A few hours after signing the sales contract, Serafina leaves the company with the mysterious man. Upon returning, she secretly enters Ernesto's office and downloads a file onto her PC to access a foreign bank account in which the 20 million euros that everyone thought had been lost were deposited. When Ernesto discovers that, thanks to the money miraculously found, the company is safe, he organizes a big party in the villa attended by all the family members.

Finally peace seems to have returned to the Rengoni house, but in the middle of dinner little Tino disappears. Chiara and Raoul are about to go out into the park to look for him, but suddenly everyone stops, petrified. Tino has reappeared in the dining room, but he is not alone: he is holding the hand of his father Edoardo.

== Season 2 ==
The premier of second season of Una grande famiglia had over 19 percent of the audience share in Italy, representing approximately 5,265,000 viewers.

== See also ==
- List of Italian television series
