= Capaci =

- Comune
- Dom
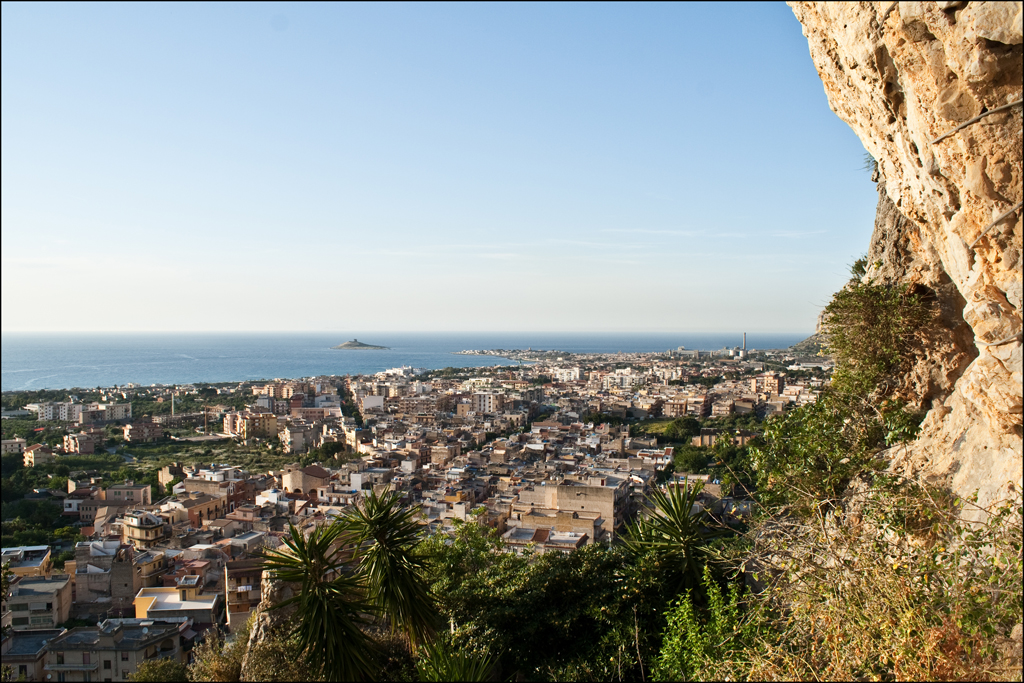

- Location within Italy Location within Sicily
- Coordinates: 38°10′N 13°14′E
- Country: Italy
- Region: Sicily
- Metropolitan city: Palermo (PA)
- Frazioni: Villaggio Sommariva Villaggio Leone

Area
  - Total: 6.12 km^{2} (2.36 sq mi)

Population (9 October 2011)
  - Total: 11,045
  - Density: 1,800/km^{2} (4,670/sq mi)
- Demonym: Capacensi
- Time zone: UTC+1 (CET)
  - Summer (DST): UTC+2 (CEST)
- Postal code: 90040
- Dialing code: 091
- Patron saint: Sant'Erasmo
- Saint day: 2 June

Capaci (Italian pronunciation: [kaˈpaːtʃi]) is a town and comune in the Metropolitan City of Palermo in Sicily, Italy. In 2011 the comune had a population of 11,045, with a density of 1,804.7 people per square kilometre.

The A29 autostrada running from Palermo to Punta Raisi Airport, and to the west and south-west of the island, passes through the commune. On 23 May 1992, this road was the scene of the assassination of anti-Mafia judge Giovanni Falcone and those with him, in an explosion known as the Capaci bombing. The site of the explosion is marked now by a memorial to those who were killed.

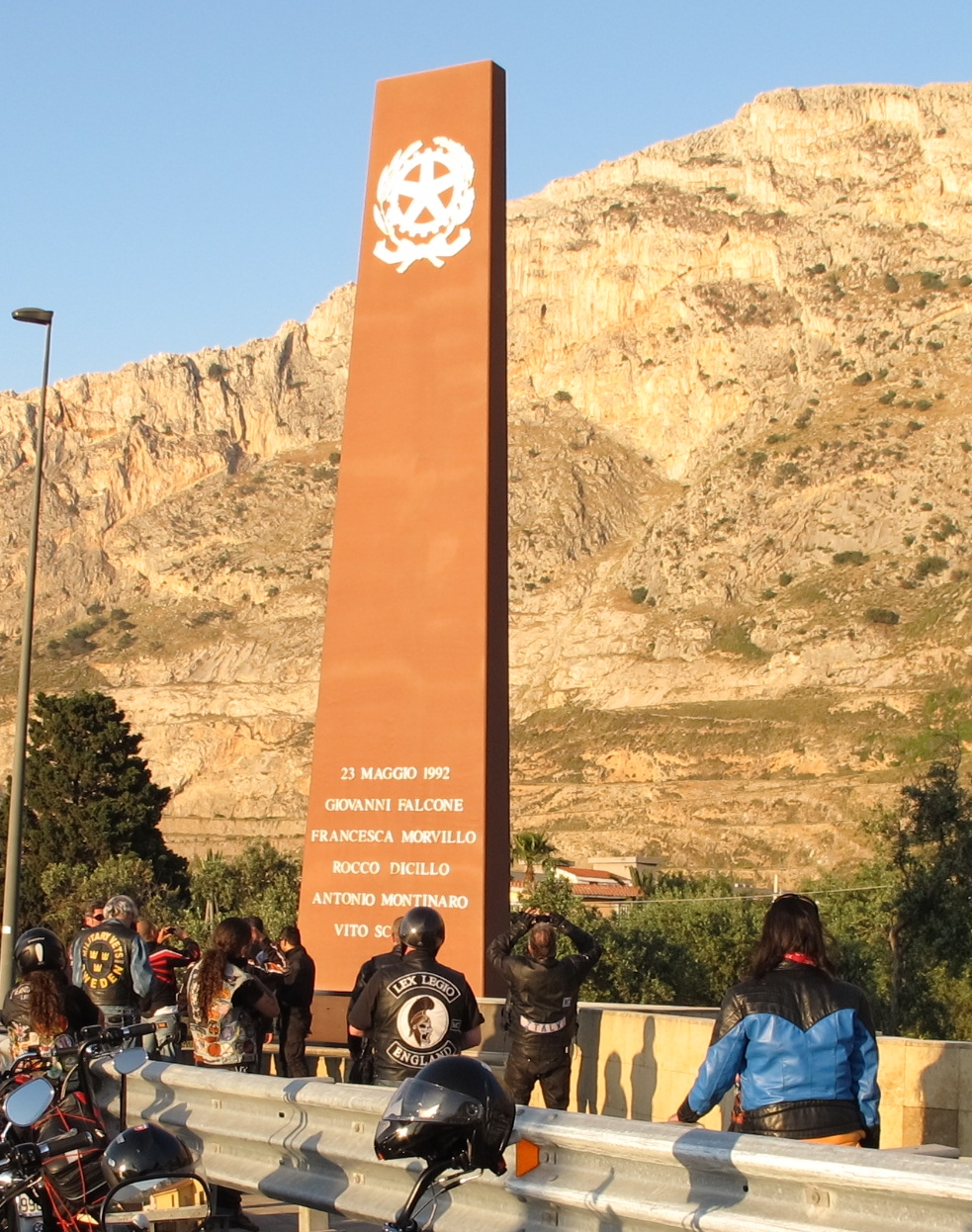
Giovanni Falcone Monument in Capaci.
