= Francesca Morvillo =

Italian magistrate murdered by the Mafia (1945–1992)

- Born: Francesca Laura Morvillo; 14 December 1945; Palermo, Italy
- Died: 23 May 1992 (aged 46); Capaci, Italy
- Cause of death: Assassinated by the Sicilian Mafia
- Education: University of Palermo
- Occupation: Magistrate
- Known for: Investigations into the Mafia
- Spouse: Giovanni Falcone (m. 1986)

Francesca Laura Morvillo (Italian pronunciation: [franˈtʃeska morˈvillo]; 14 December 1945 – 23 May 1992) was an Italian magistrate, wife of Giovanni Falcone and victim of the Sicilian Mafia. On 23 May 1992, she, her husband and three police officers on their security detail were killed in the Capaci bombing.

== Biography ==
Born in Palermo on 14 December 1945, on 26 June 1967 she graduated in Law at the University of Palermo, attaining the highest academic honours. Her thesis was entitled "Rule of Law and Security Measures", and it achieved the award "Giuseppe Maggiore" for the best thesis in criminal law for the academic year 1966/1967.

She joined the judiciary as had her brother Alfredo, and father Guido—assistant prosecutor in Palermo. Her career included practising as a judge in the Agrigento court; as Deputy Public Prosecutor at the Juvenile Court of Palermo; as Director of the Court of Appeal of Palermo; and as a member of the Commission for Competitive Entry into the magistracy.

Appointed Professor of Law, Francesca Morvillo also studied at the Faculty of Medicine of the University of Palermo, specialising in pediatric legal issues.

In 1979, her first marriage ended in divorce. Francesca Morvillo then met Giovanni Falcone, an investigating judge in the court of Palermo. They were married in a private ceremony in May 1986 by Mayor Leoluca Orlando.

== Death ==
Giovanni Brusca was tasked with killing her husband Giovanni Falcone. Salvatore Riina wanted the murder carried out in Sicily in a demonstration of Mafia power; he instructed that the attack should be on Highway A29, which Falcone had to use to get from the airport to his home on his weekly visits. 1000 kilograms of explosives were placed in a culvert under the highway between Palermo International Airport and the city of Palermo, near the town of Capaci. Brusca's men carried out test drives, using flashbulbs to simulate detonating the blast on a speeding car, and a concrete structure was specially created and destroyed in an experimental explosion to see if the bomb would be powerful enough. Leoluca Bagarella assisted at the scene during preparations.

Brusca detonated the device by remote control from a small outbuilding on a hill to the right of the highway on 23 May 1992. Falcone, along with Morvillo and police officers Rocco Di Cillo, Antonio Montinaro and Vito Schifani were killed in the blast. She is the only woman magistrate murdered in Italy.

Thousands gathered at the Church of Saint Dominic for the funerals which were broadcast live on national TV. All regular television programs were suspended. Parliament declared a day of mourning. Her husband's colleague Paolo Borsellino was killed in another bombing 57 days later, along with five police officers: Agostino Catalano, Walter Cosina, Emanuela Loi, Vincenzo Li Muli, and Claudio Traina.
