= Giovanni Falcone =

Italian judge (1939–1992)

- Born: 18 May 1939; Palermo, Italy
- Died: 23 May 1992 (aged 53); Capaci, Italy
- Cause of death: Assassinated by the Sicilian Mafia
- Education: University of Palermo
- Occupation: Magistrate
- Known for: Investigations into the Mafia
- Spouse: Francesca Morvillo (m. 1986)

Giovanni Falcone (Italian: [dʒoˈvanni falˈkoːne]; 18 May 1939 – 23 May 1992) was an Italian judge and prosecuting magistrate. From his office in the Palace of Justice in Palermo, Sicily, he spent most of his professional life trying to overthrow the power of the Sicilian Mafia. After a long and distinguished career, culminating in the Maxi Trial in 1986–1987, on 23 May 1992, Falcone was assassinated by the Corleonesi Mafia in the Capaci bombing, on the A29 motorway near the town of Capaci.

His life parallels that of his close friend Paolo Borsellino. They both spent their early years in the same neighbourhood in Palermo. Though many of their childhood friends grew up in an environment in which the Mafia had a strong presence, both men fought against organised crime as prosecuting magistrates. They were both killed in 1992, a few weeks apart. In recognition of their tireless effort and sacrifice during the anti-mafia trials, they were both awarded the Gold Medal for Civil Valor and were acknowledged as martyrs of the Catholic Church. They were also named as heroes of the last 60 years in the 13 November 2006 issue of Time.

== Early life ==
Falcone was born in 1939 to a middle-class family in the Via Castrofilippo near the seaport district La Kalsa, a neighbourhood of central Palermo that suffered extensive destruction by aerial attacks during the Allied invasion of Sicily in 1943. His father, Arturo Falcone, the director of a provincial chemical laboratory, was married to Luisa Bentivegna. Giovanni had two older sisters, Anna and Maria. Falcone's parents emphasised the importance of hard work, bravery and patriotism; he later said they 'expected the maximum' from him. At school, Falcone would get into fights with bigger children if he thought his friends were being picked on.

The Mafia was present in the area but quiescent; Tommaso Spadaro, a boy with whom he played ping-pong in the neighbourhood Catholic Action recreation centre, would later become a notorious Mafia smuggler and killer, but mafiosi were not a major presence in his childhood. As boys, Falcone and Borsellino, who were born in the same neighbourhood, played soccer together on the Piazza Magione. Both had classmates who ended up as mafiosi. Falcone grew up at a time when Sicilians did not acknowledge the existence of the Mafia as a coherent organised group; assertions to the contrary by other Italians were often seen as 'attacks from the north'.

After a classical education, Falcone studied law at the University of Palermo following a brief period of study at Livorno's naval academy. Falcone and Borsellino met again at Palermo University. While Falcone drifted away from his parents' middle-class conservative Catholicism towards communism, Borsellino was religious and conservative; in his youth, he had been a member of the Fronte Universitario d'Azione Nazionale (FUAN), a right-wing university organisation affiliated with the neo-fascist MSI (Movimento Sociale Italiano). However, neither ever joined a political party, and although the ideologies of their political movements were diametrically opposed, they shared a history of opposing the Mafia. Their different political leanings did not thwart their friendship. Falcone wanted a naval career, but his father thought him too independent-minded for the armed forces and sent him to study law.

After graduating in 1961, Falcone began to practice law before being appointed a judge in 1964. Falcone eventually gravitated toward penal law after serving as a district magistrate. He was assigned to the prosecutor's office in Trapani and Marsala, and then in 1978 to the bankruptcy court in Palermo.

== First trial against the Mafia ==
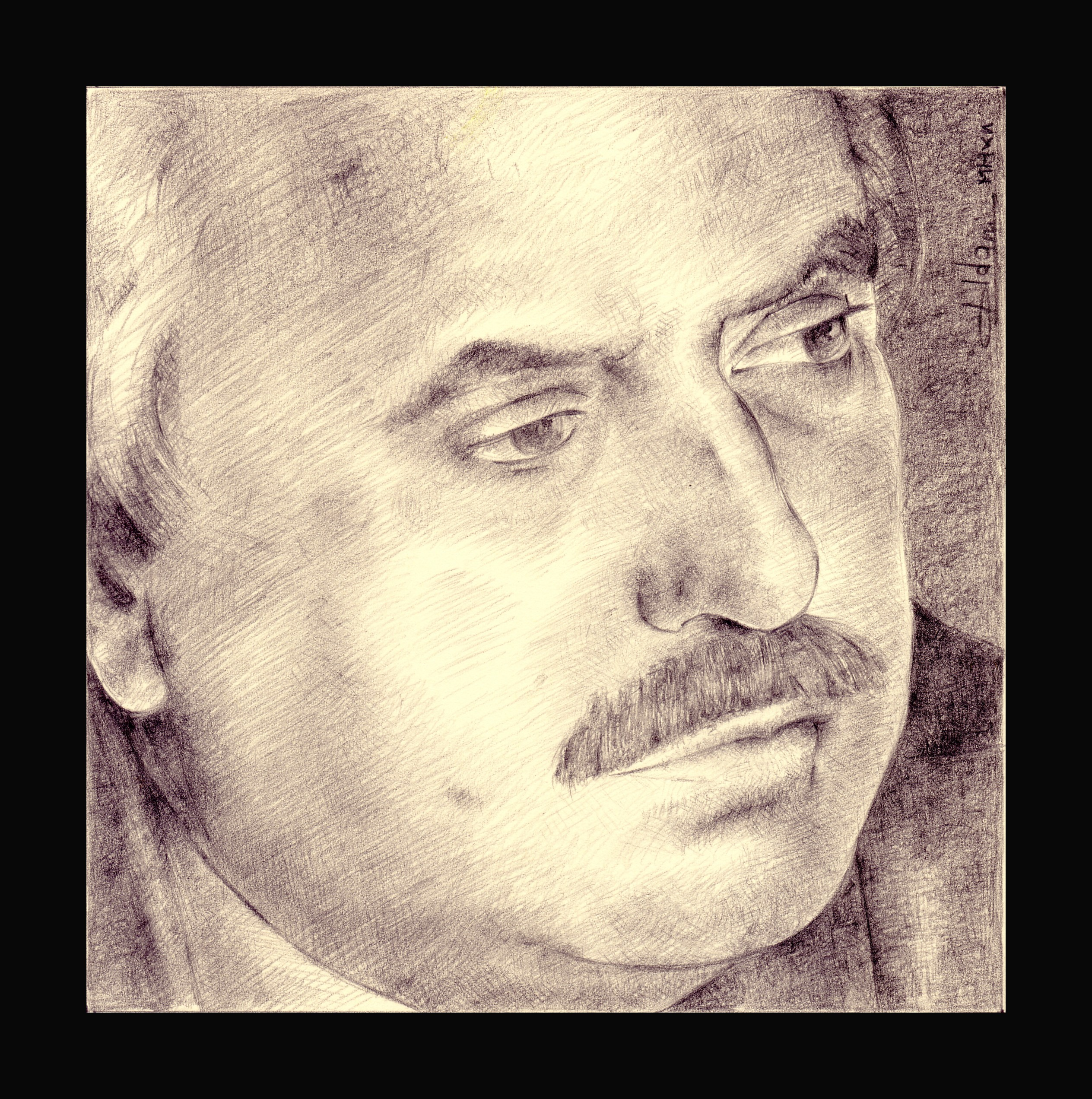
Antimafia prosecutor Giovanni Falcone in a drawing

In early 1980, Falcone joined the ‘Office of Instruction’ (Ufficio istruzione), the investigative branch of the Prosecution Office of Palermo. He started to work at a particularly tense moment. Judge Cesare Terranova, a former parliamentary deputy and Antimafia reformer who had been the main prosecutor of the Mafia in the 1960s, was to have headed this office, but he was killed on 25 September 1979. Only two months earlier, on 21 July 1979, Boris Giuliano had been assassinated; he headed the police investigation squad investigating heroin trafficking by the Mafia headed by Rosario Spatola and Salvatore Inzerillo. Taking Terranova's place was Rocco Chinnici, who was murdered by the Mafia in July 1983.

On 5 May 1980, Giuliano's successor in investigating the heroin network, Carabinieri captain Emanuele Basile, was killed. The next day, the prosecuting judge Gaetano Costa signed 55 arrest warrants against the heroin-trafficking network of the Spatola-Inzerillo-Gambino clan. From Sicily, heroin was moved to the Gambino crime family in New York, who were related to the Inzerillos. Chinnici appointed Falcone to investigate the case, one of the biggest Antimafia operations in more than a decade. Costa signed the indictments after virtually all of the other prosecutors in his office had declined to do so – a fact that leaked out of the office and eventually cost him his life: he was murdered on 6 August 1980, on the orders of Inzerillo. Falcone was given bodyguards the next day.

In this tense atmosphere, Falcone introduced an innovative investigative technique in the Spatola investigation, seizing bank records to follow "the money trail" created by heroin deals to build his case, applying the skills he had learned unravelling bankruptcies. He was probably among the first Sicilian magistrates to establish working relationships with colleagues from other countries, thus developing an early understanding of the global dimensions of heroin trafficking, while enhancing the meagre investigative resources of his office. A colleague was astonished to discover that Falcone, who had no computers at his disposal, was personally recording the details listed on printouts of transactions that he had requisitioned from every bank in Palermo province.

He learned that the chemists of the French Connection had moved clandestine labs for refining heroin from Marseille to Sicily. At the end of 1980, he visited the United States and started to work with the U.S. Justice Department, resulting in "some of the biggest international law enforcement operations in history", such as the Pizza Connection. The inquiries extended to Turkey, an important stopover on the route of morphine base; to Switzerland, where bank secrecy laws facilitated money laundering; and to Naples, where cigarette smuggling rings were being reconfigured as heroin operations. At the end of 1981, Falcone finalised the Spatola case for trial, which enabled the prosecution to win 74 convictions, based on Falcone's "web of solid evidence, bank and travel records, seized heroin shipments, fingerprint and handwriting analyses, wiretapped conversations and firsthand testimony" that proved that "Sicily had replaced France as the principal gateway for refining and exporting heroin to the United States".

== Antimafia pool ==
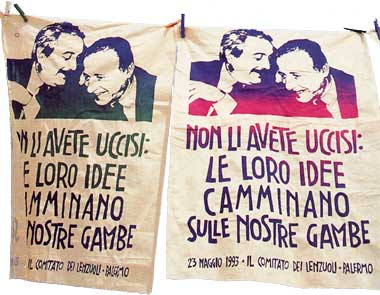
Sheets exposed in solidarity with Giovanni Falcone and Paolo Borsellino. They read: "You did not kill them: their ideas walk on our legs".

Giovanni Falcone and Paolo Borsellino in March 1992. This image of the two assassinated judges, seen on posters and articles after their deaths, has since become an icon in the struggle against the Mafia.

Falcone was plagued by a chronic lack of resources in his capacity as a magistrate. A law to create a new offence of Mafia conspiracy and to confiscate Mafia assets was introduced by Pio La Torre, but it had been stalled in parliament for two years before La Torre was murdered on 30 April 1982. In May 1982, the Italian government sent Carlo Alberto Dalla Chiesa, a general of the Italian Carabinieri, to Sicily with orders to crush the Mafia. However, not long after arriving, on 3 September 1982, the General was gunned down in the city centre, his young wife by his side. Sicilians rose up in outrage. Outside the church, the politicians who attended were jeered and spat on, and blamed by Sicilians for tolerating the Mafia for so long. In response, the Italian government finally offered investigators the backing they needed, and Pio La Torre's law was passed 10 days later.

Falcone's responsibilities as a magistrate put tremendous strain on his personal life. In May 1986, he married his fiancée, Francesca Morvillo; Falcone had Mayor Leoluca Orlando himself conduct the private ceremony.

He became part of Palermo's informal Antimafia Pool, created by Judge Rocco Chinnici. This was a group of investigating magistrates who worked closely together, sharing information and developing new investigative and prosecutorial strategies. Most importantly, they assumed collective responsibility for carrying Mafia prosecutions forward: all the members of the pool signed prosecutorial orders to avoid exposing any one of them to particular risk, such as the one that had cost judge Gaetano Costa his life. Along with Falcone, the group included Paolo Borsellino, Giuseppe Di Lello and Leonardo Guarnotta.

== Maxi Trial ==
The Antimafia pool laid the groundwork for the Maxi Trial against the Sicilian Mafia at the preliminary investigative phase. Following Chinnici's murder in July 1983, Antonino Caponnetto headed the pool. Falcone's friend, Antonio Cassara (who headed the police squad hunting fugitives), was murdered in 1985. Falcone led the prosecution for the trial, which began on 10 February 1986 and ended on 16 December 1987. Of the 475 defendants—both those present and those tried in absentia—338 were convicted. A total of 2,665 years of prison sentences was shared out between the guilty, not including the life sentences handed to the 19 leading Mafia bosses and killers, including Michele Greco, Giuseppe Marchese and—in absentia—Salvatore Riina, Giuseppe Lucchese and Bernardo Provenzano.

One of the most important factors in the trial was the testimony of Tommaso Buscetta, the first-ever Sicilian Mafiosi boss to become an informant (pentito). His assertion that the Mafia was not a collection of separate gangs but a single organisation led some magistrates and detectives to question his credibility. After an interview, Falcone became convinced that Buscetta was genuine and treated him with respect. Buscetta's key revelation was that a governing council, known as the Commission or Cupula headed a collective structure, thereby establishing that the top tier of Mafia members were complicit in all the organisation's crimes. This premise became known as the Buscetta theorem.

== Setback ==
When Falcone's record of success and high profile led to resentment from some quarters, he was not given the job he coveted as chief prosecutor in Palermo. The new incumbent did not accept that the hierarchical Mafia structure revealed by the Maxi Trial actually existed, and he attempted to force Falcone to work on cases of wife beating and car theft. Falcone became so frustrated that he spoke of resigning. During 1988 Falcone collaborated with Rudolph Giuliani, at the time U.S. Attorney for the Southern District of New York, in operations against the Gambino and Inzerillo families. Rumours impugning his integrity deeply troubled Falcone during this period.

On 20 June 1989, a sack filled with dynamite sticks was discovered near a beach house Falcone had rented in the town of Addaura by policeman Nino Agostino. Although Falcone had been threatened before, this failed attempt bothered him to the extreme because it had all the signs of an inside job. At the time, he was meeting Swiss prosecutors Carla Del Ponte and Claudio Lehman from Lugano, who were helping to investigate the Mafia's financial holdings in Switzerland. Falcone believed that the assassination attempt not only involved the Mafia but some people in government as well. During the investigations into the money laundering networks of the Mafia, it became clear that former Palermo police chief Bruno Contrada, who had moved to the intelligence service SISDE, had warned a suspect about his impending arrest so that he could escape in time.

Falcone received an effusive congratulatory phone call from Giulio Andreotti after the narrow escape. Falcone privately thought it odd that Andreotti, whom he had never spoken to, would suddenly contact him, and he mused about the significance of the incident to a friend. Unknown to Falcone, the efforts to kill him were suspended while the Maxi trial verdicts went through the appeals process that had often set convicted Mafia members free. Later investigations into the murders of two police officers, Antonino Agostino and Emanuele Piazza, who worked for the secret service, revealed that they had secretly defused the bombs that had been placed by a Mafia commando aided by other secret service men. Agostino and his wife were killed on 5 August 1989 outside their home, and Piazza on 15 March 1990.

== Transfer to Rome ==
Exhausted and frustrated by the antagonism in Palermo, Falcone accepted a post in the Ministry of Justice in Rome, offered to him by Claudio Martelli, the new minister of Justice in a new government of Giulio Andreotti in March 1991. The transfer was initially seen as a capitulation by Falcone, but he himself thought of it as a tactical move to better fight the Mafia. His first action was to prepare a decree to repair the disastrous sentence by Supreme Court judge Corrado Carnevale, known as the “sentence-killer”, that allowed most of the remaining defendants of the Maxi Trial to walk free from prison. The Martelli decree led to the immediate re-arrest of the Mafia bosses.

While in Rome, he started to restructure the Italian prosecution system, creating district offices to fight the Mafia and a national office to fight organised crime. Next was his move to prevent Carnevale from reviewing the sentence of the Maxi Trial. In a blow to the Mafia, the Maxi Trial convictions were upheld by the Supreme Court in January 1992. To the surprise of many, Falcone's move to Rome was very successful. He achieved a genuine revolution in the judiciary. The Mafia began to realize that Falcone was even more dangerous in Rome than he had been in Palermo.

== Death ==
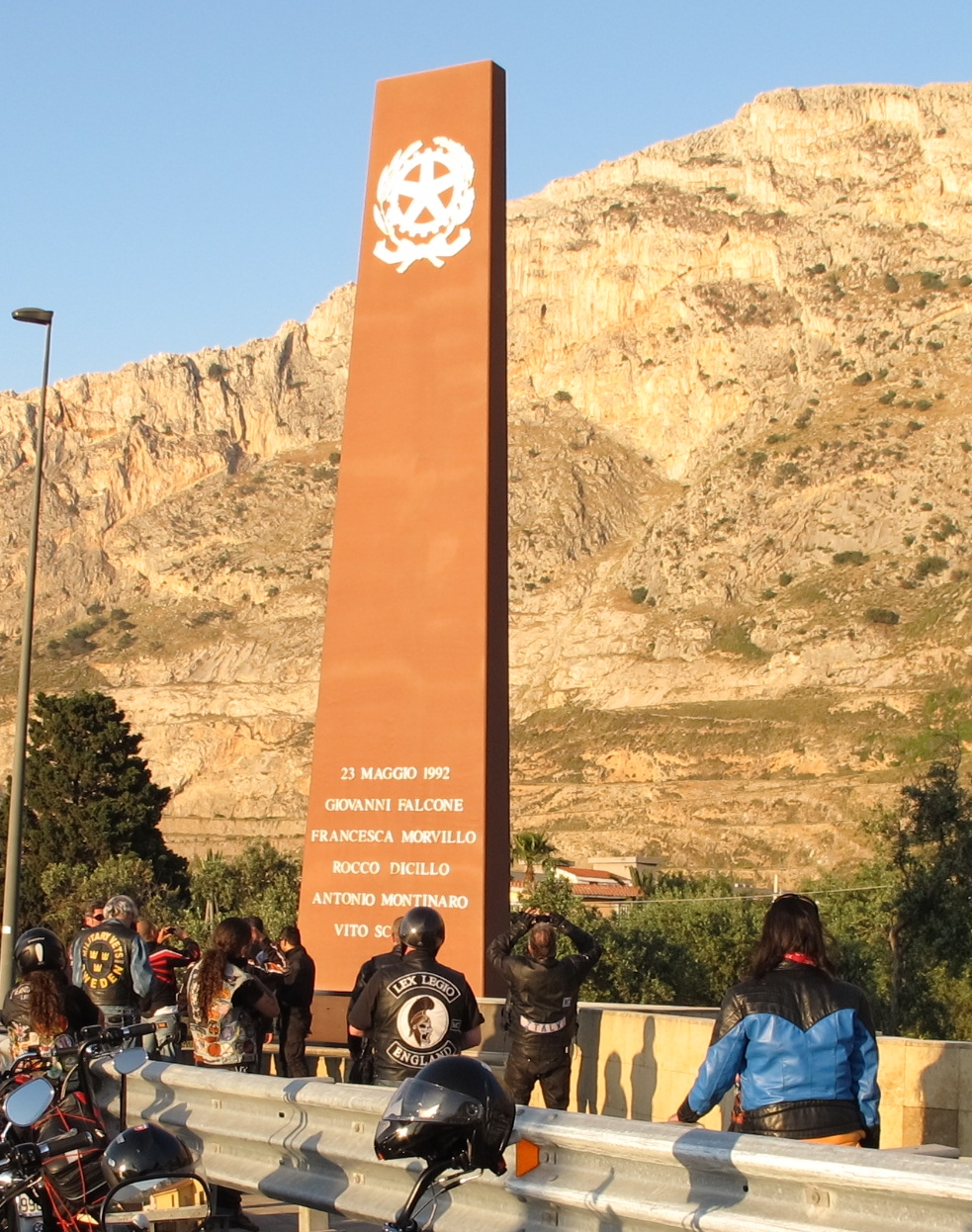
Giovanni Falcone Monument in Capaci

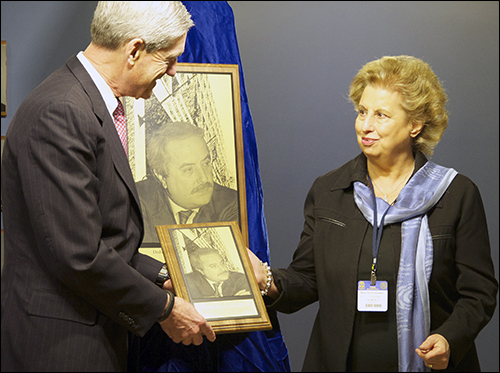
Robert Mueller presents Maria Falcone with a smaller version of a plaque that honours the life of her brother and will hang in the newly dedicated Giovanni Falcone Gallery at FBI Headquarters.

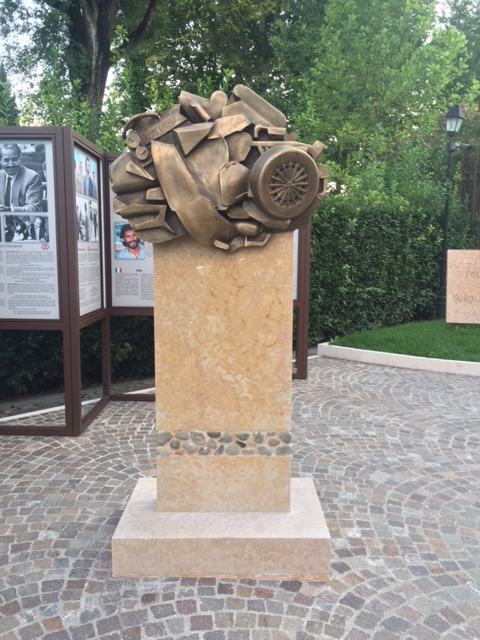
A monument in commemoration of Falcone in Peschiera del Garda, representing the mangled car in which he was assassinated by the Mafia.

The Maxi trial sentences being upheld by the Supreme Court were a blow to the Mafia's prestige. The council of top bosses, headed by Riina, reacted by ordering the assassination of Salvatore Lima (on the grounds that he was an ally of Giulio Andreotti), and Falcone. Lima was shot dead on 12 March 1992.

Giovanni Brusca was tasked with killing Falcone. Riina wanted the murder carried out in Sicily in a demonstration of Mafia power; he instructed that the attack should be on Highway A29, which Falcone had to use to get from the airport to his home on his weekly visits. Four hundred kilograms (881 lbs.) of explosives were placed in a culvert under the highway between Palermo International Airport and the city of Palermo, near the town of Capaci. Brusca's men carried out test drives, using flashbulbs to simulate detonating the blast on a speeding car, and a concrete structure was specially created and destroyed in an experimental explosion to see if the bomb would be powerful enough. Leoluca Bagarella assisted at the scene during preparations.

Brusca detonated the device by remote control from a small outbuilding on a hill to the right of the highway on 23 May 1992. Giovanni Falcone, his wife Francesca Morvillo and police officers Rocco Dicillo, Antonio Montinaro and Vito Schifani were killed in the blast. The explosion was so powerful that it registered on local earthquake monitors. Riina reportedly threw a party, toasting Falcone's death with champagne, according to the pentito Salvatore Cancemi.

Thousands gathered at the Church of Saint Dominic for the funerals, which were broadcast live on national TV. All regular television programs were suspended. Parliament declared a day of mourning. His colleague Paolo Borsellino was killed in another bombing 57 days later, along with five police officers: Agostino Catalano, Walter Cosina, Emanuela Loi, Vincenzo Li Muli, and Claudio Traina.

In the major crackdown against the Mafia following Falcone and Borsellino's deaths, Riina was arrested on 15 January 1993, and was serving a life sentence, until his death in 2017, for sanctioning the murders of both magistrates as well as many other crimes. Brusca, also known as lo scannacristiani (the people slaughterer), was convicted of Falcone's murder. He was one of Riina's associates and admitted to detonating the explosives. Dozens of mafiosi were sentenced to life imprisonment for their involvement in Falcone's murder.

Reports in May 2019 indicated that a Cosa Nostra insider revealed that John Gotti of the Gambino crime family had sent one of their explosives experts to Sicily to work with the Corleonesi Mafia clan to help plan the bombing that would kill Falcone.

=== Legacy ===
Palermo International Airport has been named Falcone-Borsellino Airport in honour of the two judges and hosts a memorial of the pair by the local sculptor Tommaso Geraci. Monuments commemorating Falcone and the other victims of the Capaci bombing were placed around Italy, including in Peschiera del Garda. Falcone was posthumously awarded the Train Foundation's Civil Courage Prize, which recognises "extraordinary heroes of conscience". A monument to Falcone stands also at the FBI's National Academy in Virginia to honour his contributions to the "Pizza Connection" case.

== In popular culture ==
- Giovanni Falcone (1993), starring Michele Placido as Falcone;
- Excellent Cadavers (1999), with Chazz Palminteri in the role of Falcone;
- Il Capo dei Capi (2007), with Andrea Tidona in the role of Falcone;
- Vi perdono ma inginocchiatevi, a 2012 TV movie that tells the story of the men of the escort of Giovanni Falcone;
- Era d'estate (2016), starring Massimo Popolizio in the role of Falcone;
- The Traitor (2019), with Fausto Russo Alesi in the role of Falcone.

== See also ==
- History of the Italian Republic#Second Republic (1992–present)
- Carlo Alberto Dalla Chiesa
- List of victims of the Sicilian Mafia
- Mani pulite
- Rovshan Aliyev

== Sources ==
- Dickie, John (2004). Cosa Nostra. A history of the Sicilian Mafia, London: Coronet, ISBN 0-340-82435-2 (Review in the Observer, 15 February 2004)
- Follain, John (2012). Vendetta: The Mafia, Judge Falcone and the Quest for Justice, London: Hodder & Stoughton, ISBN 978-1-444-71411-1
- Jamieson, Alison (2000). The Antimafia: Italy’s fight against organized crime, London: Macmillan, ISBN 0-333-80158-X.
- La Licata, Francesco (1993), Storia di Giovanni Falcone, Milan: Rizzoli
- Lodato, Saverio (1999), Ho ucciso Giovanni Falcone: la confessione di Giovanni Brusca, Milan: Mondadori
- Schneider, Jane T. & Peter T. Schneider (2003). Reversible Destiny: Mafia, Antimafia, and the Struggle for Palermo, Berkeley: University of California Press ISBN 0-520-23609-2
- Stille, Alexander (1995). Excellent Cadavers: The Mafia and the Death of the First Italian Republic, New York: Vintage ISBN 0-09-959491-9
